= Lake Rotokereru =

Lake in New Zealand

- Location within Northland Region
- Location: Northland Region, North Island
- Coordinates: 35°26′20.9″S 174°05′13.5″E
- Basin countries: New Zealand

Lake Rotokereru is a lake in the Northland Region of New Zealand.

== See also ==
- List of lakes in New Zealand
