= Lake Ngakeketa =

- Location within Northland Region
- Location: Northland Region, North Island
- Coordinates: 34.5207°S 172.7712°E
- Type: dune lake
- Primary outflows: Te Paki Stream
- Basin countries: New Zealand
- Surface area: 12.5 hectares (31 acres)
- Max. depth: 8.7 metres (29 ft)

Lake Ngakeketa is a dune lake in the Northland Region of New Zealand. It is located near Te Paki Stream Road, in the general area of the Te Paki Recreation Reserve.

The lake was formed when a stream was impounded by dunes, it features two arms, with the western arm fed by a stream flowing from the north. The catchment consists of native scrub (70%), pasture and pines (20%) and a mobile sand dune (10%) near the outlet into Te Paki Stream.

== See also ==
- List of lakes in New Zealand
