= List of lakes of New Zealand =

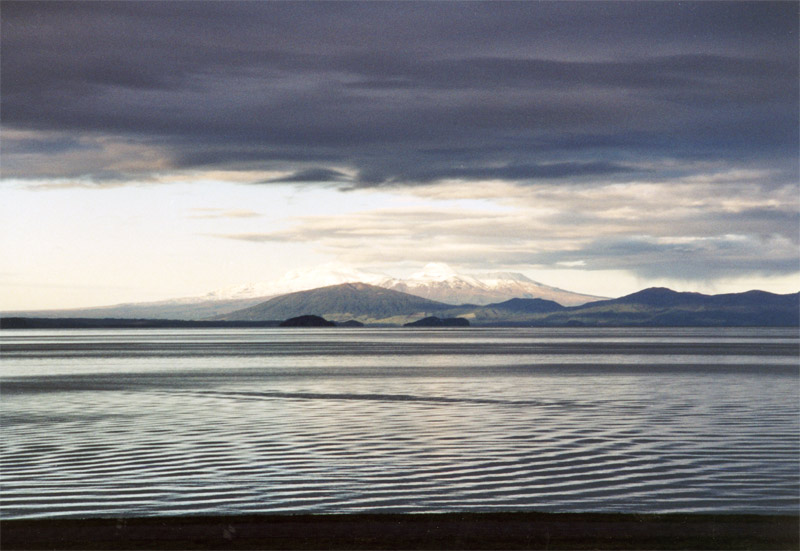
Lake Taupō, New Zealand's largest lake

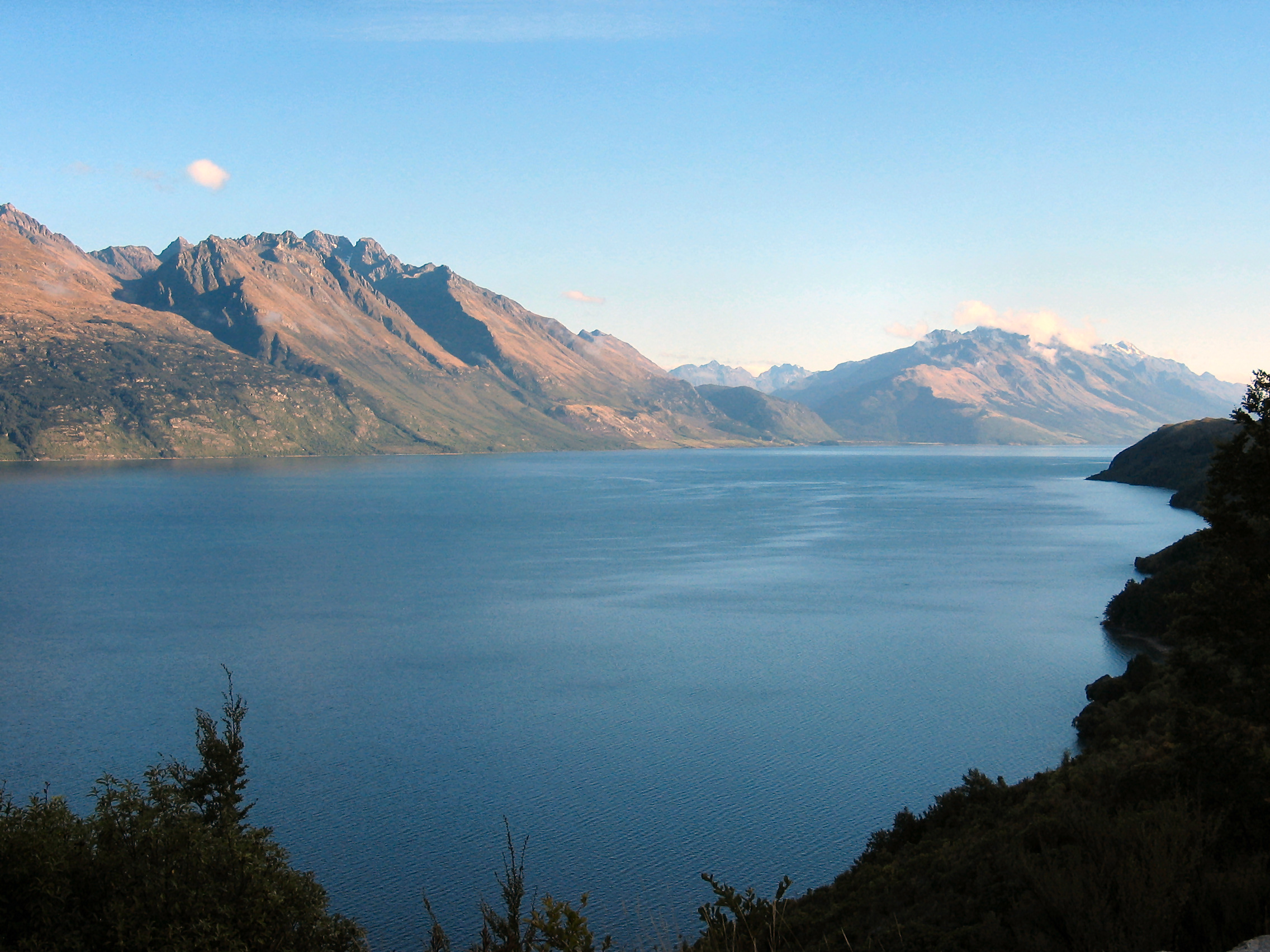
Lake Wakatipu from Queenstown

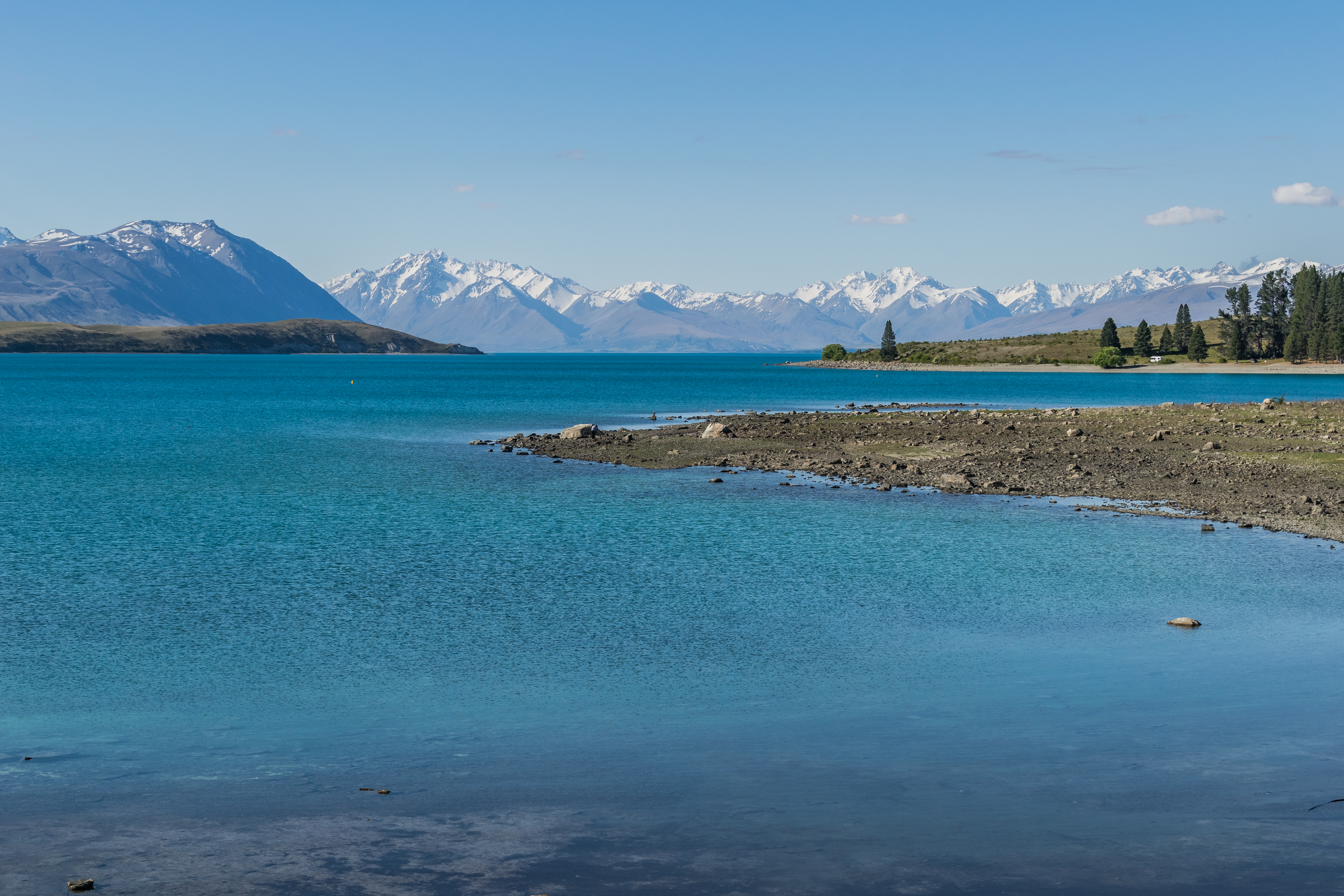
Lake Tekapo

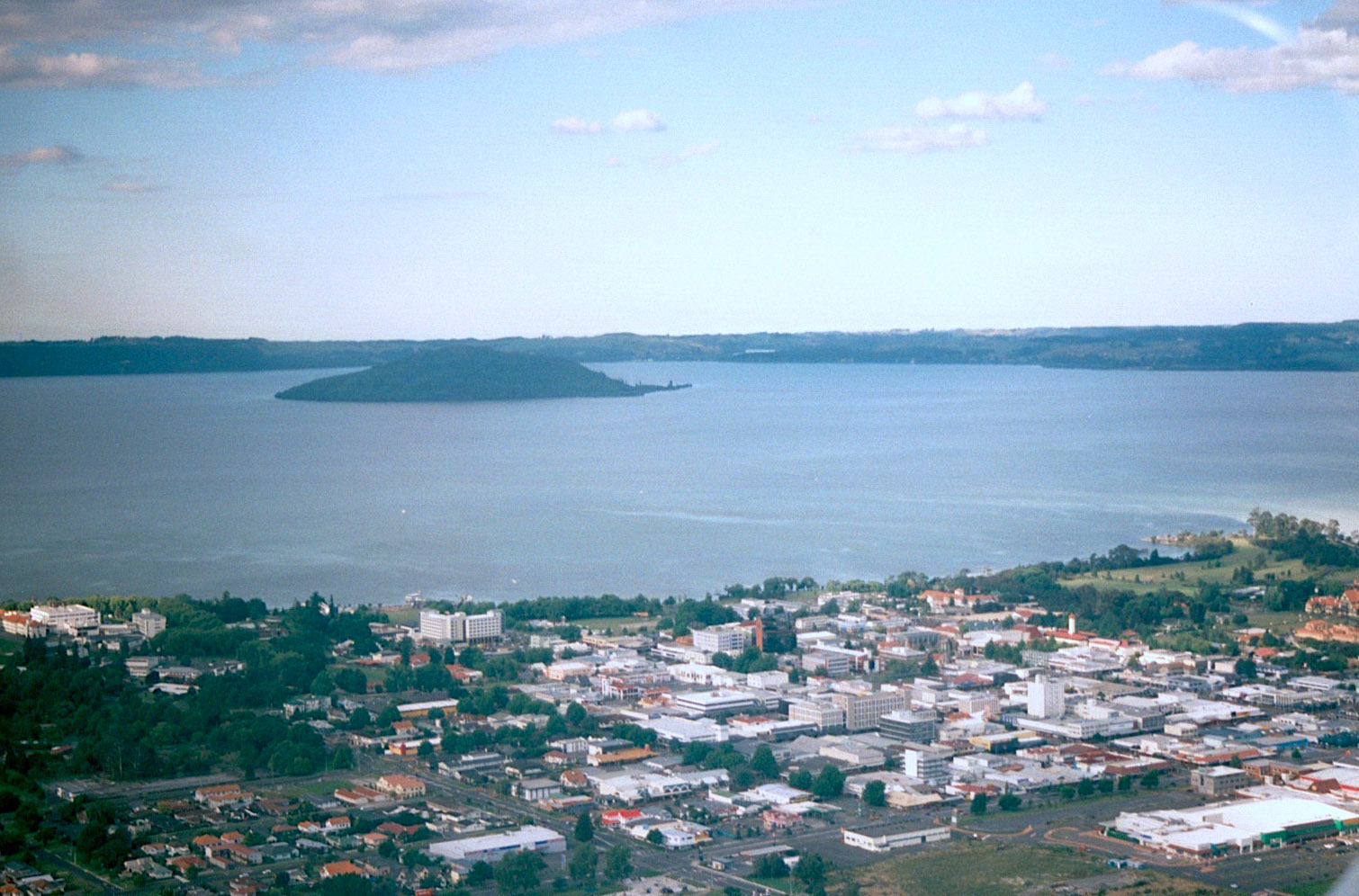
Lake Rotorua from above Rotorua

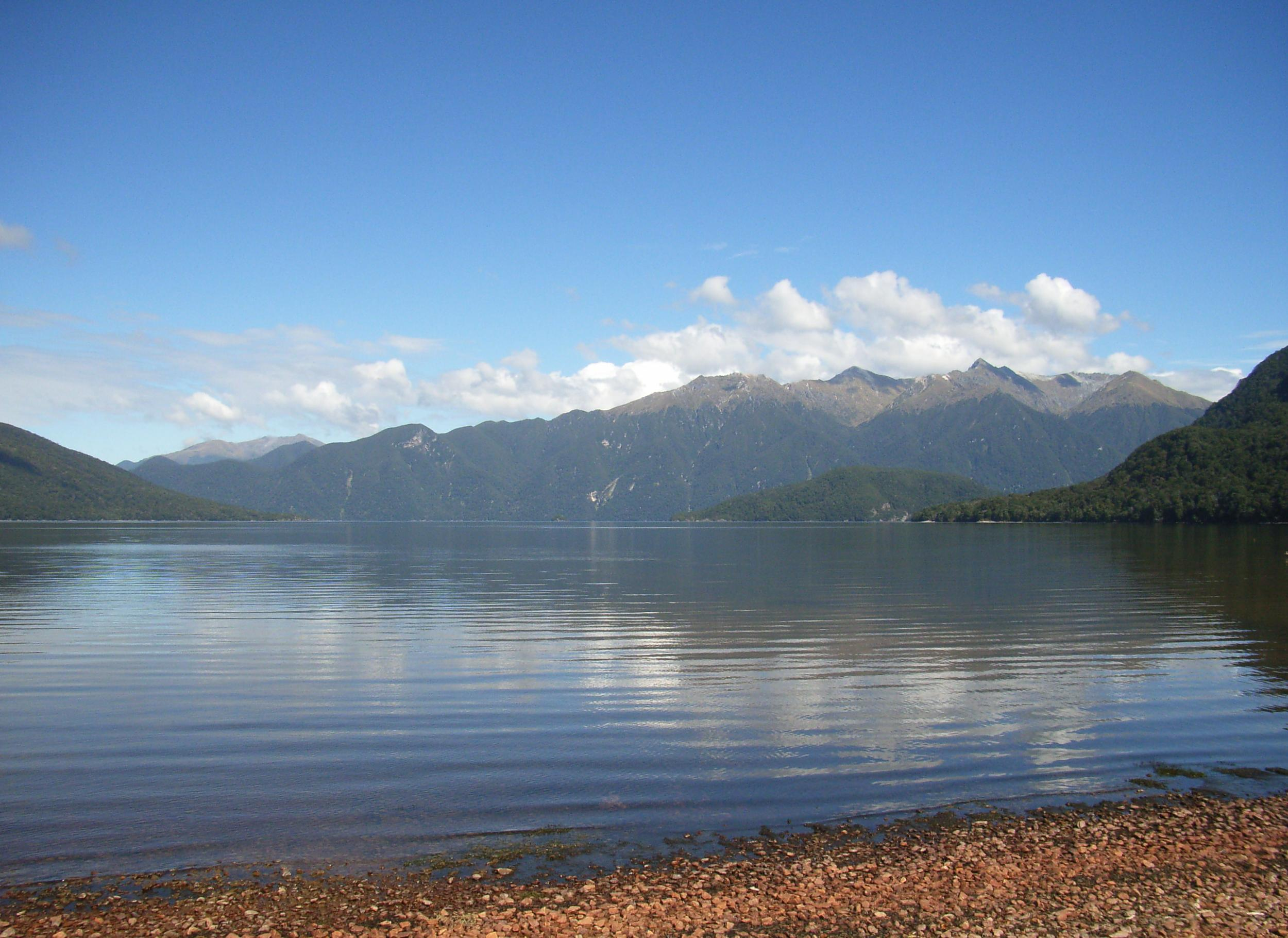
Lake Hauroko, New Zealand's deepest lake

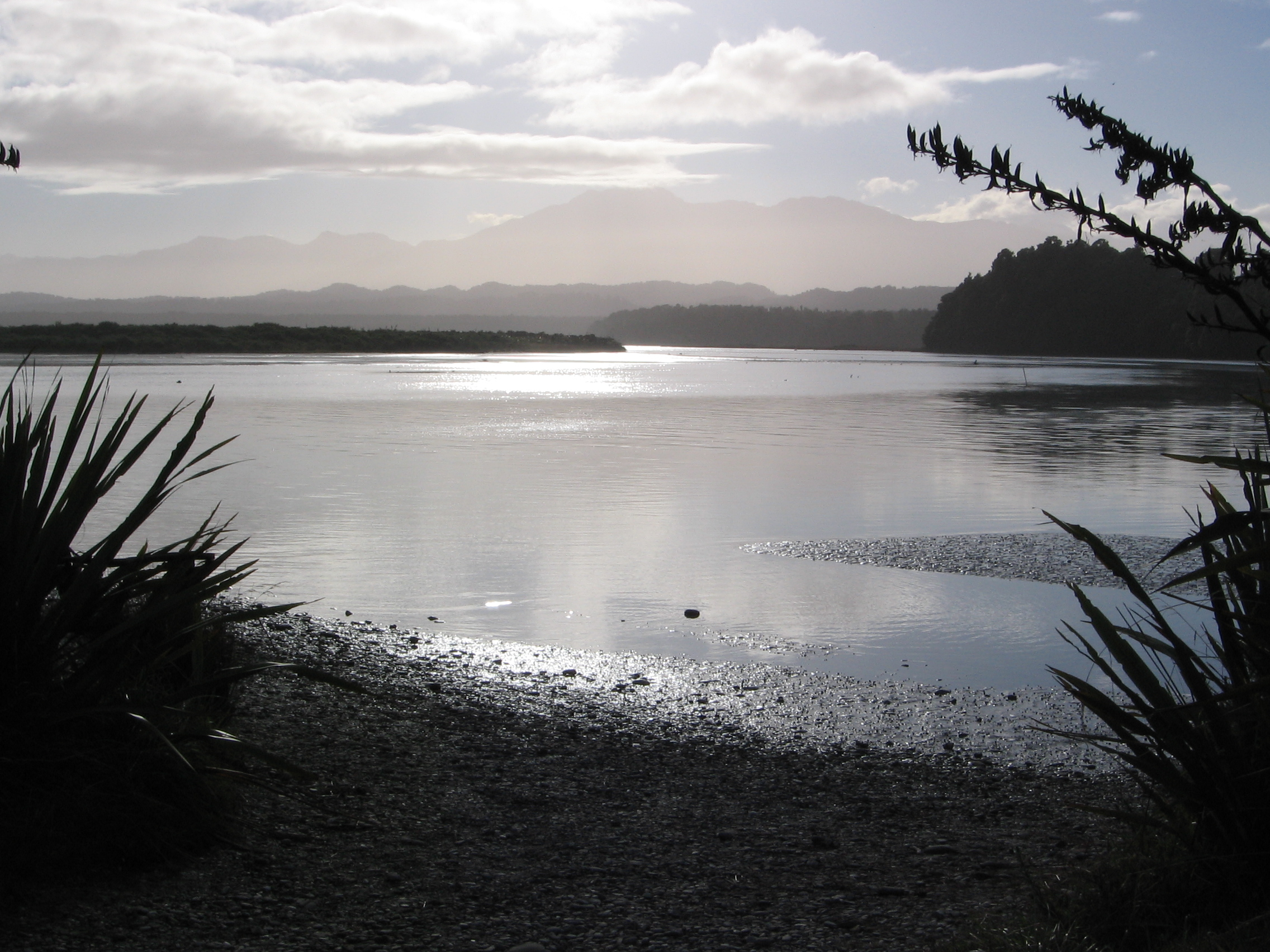
Ōkārito Lagoon

This is a list of lakes in New Zealand.

A lake's location is identified by the region and either the territorial authority or national park (N.P.).

There are:

- 43 lakes with a surface area larger than 10 km^{2} (1000 ha)
- 231 lakes greater than 0.5 km^{2} (50 ha)
- 3822 lakes greater than 0.01 km^{2} (1 ha)

== Largest ==
Lakes with a surface area of more than 10 square kilometres (3.9 sq mi)

Rank	Name	Surface area	Region	Notes
1	Lake Taupō	616 km^{2} (238 sq mi)	Waikato	Largest lake in New Zealand; second-largest freshwater lake in Oceania
2	Lake Te Anau	344 km^{2} (133 sq mi)	Southland	Largest lake in the South Island
3	Lake Wakatipu	291 km^{2} (112 sq mi)	Otago	Longest lake in New Zealand (80 kilometres (50 mi))
4	Lake Wānaka	192 km^{2} (74 sq mi)	Otago	
5	Lake Ellesmere / Te Waihora	180 km^{2} (69 sq mi)	Canterbury	Largest lagoon in mainland New Zealand
5	Te Whanga Lagoon	180 km^{2} (69 sq mi)	Chatham Island	Largest lake outside the North Island and South Island
7	Lake Pukaki	179 km^{2} (69 sq mi)	Canterbury	
8	Lake Manapouri	142 km^{2} (55 sq mi)	Southland	Contains largest inland island within New Zealand, Pomona Island
9	Lake Hāwea	141 km^{2} (54 sq mi)	Otago	
10	Lake Tekapo	83 km^{2} (32 sq mi)	Canterbury	
11	Lake Rotorua / Te Rotorua nui ā Kahumatamomoe	79 km^{2} (31 sq mi)	Bay of Plenty	
12	Lake Wairarapa	78 km^{2} (30 sq mi)	Wellington	
13	Lake Benmore	75 km^{2} (29 sq mi)	Canterbury/Otago	Largest artificial lake in New Zealand
14	Lake Hauroko	63 km^{2} (24 sq mi)	Southland	Deepest lake in New Zealand
15	Lake Ōhau	63 km^{2} (24 sq mi)	Canterbury	
16	Lake Waikaremoana	54 km^{2} (21 sq mi)	Hawke's Bay	
17	Lake Coleridge	47 km^{2} (18 sq mi)	Canterbury	
18	Lake Poteriteri	43 km^{2} (17 sq mi)	Southland	Largest lake in New Zealand without road access
19	Lake Brunner / Moana	40 km^{2} (15 sq mi)	West Coast	
20	Lake Tarawera	39 km^{2} (15 sq mi)	Bay of Plenty	
21	Lake Rotoiti / Te Roto kite ā Ihenga i ariki ai Kahu	35 km^{2} (14 sq mi)	Bay of Plenty	
22	Lake Waikare	34 km^{2} (13 sq mi)	Waikato	
23	Lake Monowai	31 km^{2} (12 sq mi)	Southland	
24	Lake Aviemore	29 km^{2} (11 sq mi)	Canterbury	Artificial
25	Lake McKerrow / Whakatipu Waitai	28 km^{2} (11 sq mi)	Southland	
26	Lake Dunstan	26 km^{2} (10 sq mi)	Otago	Artificial
27	Lake Rotoroa	23.5 km^{2} (9.1 sq mi)	Tasman	Largest lake in the Tasman Region
28	Lake Kaniere	22 km^{2} (8.5 sq mi)	West Coast	
29=	Lake Ōmāpere	14 km^{2} (5.4 sq mi)	Northland	
29=	Lake Sumner	14 km^{2} (5.4 sq mi)	Canterbury	
31	Lake Rotoaira	13 km^{2} (5.0 sq mi)	Waikato	
32=	Ōkārito Lagoon	12 km^{2} (4.6 sq mi)	West Coast	
32=	Lake Ohakuri	12 km^{2} (4.6 sq mi)	Waikato	Artificial
33	Lake Rotomā	11.2 km^{2} (4.3 sq mi)	Bay of Plenty	
	+9 other lakes	>10 km^{2}		

=== Deepest lakes ===
Maximum depth and average depth in metres:

- Lake Hauroko: 462 and ~117.
- Lake Manapouri: 444 and 149.
- Lake Te Anau: 425 and ~169.
- Lake Wakatipu: 420 and ~217.
- Lake Hāwea: 392 and ~161.
- Lake Wānaka: 311 and ~160.

These six lakes are all situated on the South Island. The deepest lake on the North Island is:

- Lake Waikaremoana: 256 and 75.

== North Island ==
=== Northland ===
The following lakes are located in the Northland Region.

Lake	Location	Area	Notes	Coordinates
Bulrush Lake	Far North District	0.11 km^{2}	Northern Aupōuri Peninsula	34°42′30″S 172°59′50″E
Half Mile Lagoon	Far North District		Northern Aupōuri Peninsula	34°43′13″S 172°59′40″E
Lake Carrot	Far North District		Isthmus of Aupōuri Peninsula	35°01′20″S 173°11′15″E
Lake Gem (or Lake Little Gem)	Far North District		South of Lake Ngatu	35°02′22″S 173°11′40″E
Lake Half	Far North District		Northern Aupōuri Peninsula	34°44′05″S 173°00′00″E
Lake Heather	Far North District	0.125 km^{2}	North of Lake Rotoroa	35°03′00″S 173°11′40″E
Lake Humuhumu	Kaipara District		Southern Pouto Peninsula	36°19′40″S 174°07′20″E
Lake Kahuparere	Kaipara District		Southern Pouto Peninsula	36°22′10″S 174°09′30″E
Lake Kaiiwi	Kaipara District		South of Lake Taharoa	35°48′50″S 173°39′20″E
Lake Kaiwai	Far North District			35°25′35″S 173°55′50″E
Lake Kanono	Kaipara District		Southern Pouto Peninsula	36°21′50″S 174°08′40″E
Lake Kapoai	Kaipara District		Northern Pouto Peninsula	36°02′40″S 173°49′57″E
Lake Karaka	Kaipara District		Southern Pouto Peninsula	36°18′45″S 174°02′25″E
Lake Karoro / Mathews	Kaipara District		Southern Pouto Peninsula	36°23′00″S 174°04′30″E
Lake Kihona	Far North District		Northern Aupōuri Peninsula	34°37′45″S 172°54′10″E
Lake Manuwai	Far North District		Northwest of Kerikeri	35°10′30″S 173°51′50″E
Lake Mokeno	Kaipara District		Southern Pouto Peninsula	36°21′00″S 174°03′40″E
Lake Morehurehu	Far North District		Northern Aupōuri Peninsula	34°38′30″S 172°59′40″E
Lake Ngakapua	Far North District		Isthmus of Aupōuri Peninsula	35°01′13″S 173°11′35″E
Lake Ngakeketa	Far North District		Northern Aupōuri Peninsula	34°31′05″S 172°46′10″E
Lake Ngatu	Far North District		Isthmus of Aupōuri Peninsula	35°01′50″S 173°11′50″E
Lake Ōmāpere	Far North District	14 km^{2}	North of Kaikohe. Maximum depth: 3m	35°21′00″S 173°48′00″E
Lake Ora	Whangarei District		Northwest of Whangārei	35°41′45″S 174°17′05″E
Lake Otapuiti	Kaipara District		Southern Pouto Peninsula	36°21′35″S 174°04′25″E
Lake Owhareiti	Far North District			35°23′20″S 173°56′40″E
Lake Parawanui	Kaipara District		Northern Pouto Peninsula	36°03′42″S 173°51′00″E
Lake Puhau	Far North District		Close to Hokianga Harbour	35°28′38″S 173°21′57″E
Lake Rotokawau	Far North District		Isthmus of Aupōuri Peninsula	35°01′10″S 173°12′20″E
Lake Rotokawau	Far North District		Karikari Peninsula	34°52′10″S 173°18′40″E
Lake Rotokawau	Kaipara District		Southern Pouto Peninsula	36°20′50″S 174°08′50″E
Lake Rotokereru	Far North District			35°26′21″S 174°05′13″E
Lake Rotomata	Far North District		Close to Hokianga Harbour	35°28′00″S 173°21′52″E
Lake Rotootuauru	Kaipara District		Southern Pouto Peninsula	36°19′55″S 174°08′20″E
Lake Rotopouua	Kaipara District		Southern Pouto Peninsula	36°19′10″S 174°06′30″E
Lake Rotoroa	Far North District			35°03′40″S 173°11′40″E
Lake Rototuna	Kaipara District		Southern Pouto Peninsula	36°15′10″S 174°02′30″E
Lake Rototuna Lower	Kaipara District		Southern Pouto Peninsula	36°15′27″S 174°03′05″E
Lake Taeore	Far North District		Northern Aupōuri Peninsula	34°40′30″S 173°01′15″E
Lake Taharoa	Kaipara District			35°48′20″S 173°39′00″E
Lake Tairutu	Far North District		Close to Hokianga Harbour	35°29′25″S 173°22′35″E
Lake Tauanui	Far North District			35°30′00″S 173°51′30″E
Lake Te Kahika	Far North District		Northern Aupōuri Peninsula	34°37′27″S 173°00′00″E
Lake Wahakari	Far North District		Northern Aupōuri Peninsula	34°39′10″S 172°55′30″E
Lake Waikanae	Far North District		Northern Aupōuri Peninsula	34°36′15″S 172°52′32″E
Lake Waikaramū	Far North District		Waihuahua Swamp, southern Aupōuri Peninsula	34°55′00″S 173°14′10″E
Lake Waikere	Kaipara District		Northwest of Lake Taharoa	35°48′00″S 173°37′45″E
Lake Waimimiha	Far North District		North of Ahipara	35°08′45″S 173°10′15″E
Lake Waingaro	Far North District		Southwest of Kerikeri	35°15′40″S 173°52′50″E
Lake Waingata	Kaipara District		Southern Pouto Peninsula	36°21′05″S 174°09′05″E
Lake Wainui	Kaipara District		Northern Pouto Peninsula	36°06′05″S 173°52′55″E
Lake Waiparera	Far North District		Southern Aupōuri Peninsula	34°56′40″S 173°10′50″E
Lake Waiporohita	Far North District		Karikari Peninsula	34°54′00″S 173°20′55″E
Lake Wairere	Kaipara District		Southern Pouto Peninsula	36°16′20″S 174°00′50″E
Lake Whakaneke	Kaipara District		Southern Pouto Peninsula	36°22′05″S 174°03′45″E
Lake Whirirau	Far North District		Close to Hokianga Harbour	35°27′37″S 173°18′54″E
Phoebes Lake	Kaipara District		Southern Pouto Peninsula	36°18′10″S 174°04′40″E
Rotopouri	Kaipara District		Southern Pouto Peninsula	36°18′10″S 174°05′18″E
Salt Lake	Far North District		Northern Aupōuri Peninsula	34°42′20″S 173°01′30″E
Shag Lake	Kaipara District		Northwest of Lake Taharoa	35°47′30″S 173°36′25″E
Split Lake	Far North District		Southwest of Lake Rotoroa	35°03′59″S 173°10′57″E
Swan Lake	Far North District		Northern Aupōuri Peninsula	34°44′55″S 173°00′00″E
Swan Lake	Far North District		Southern Aupōuri Peninsula	34°54′23″S 173°08′50″E
The Big Lake	Far North District		Northern Aupōuri Peninsula	34°32′40″S 172°49′40″E
Waihopo Lake	Far North District		Northern Aupōuri Peninsula	34°45′20″S 173°02′35″E
Waitahora Lagoon	Far North District		Close to Spirits Bay, northern Aupōuri Peninsula	34°27′20″S 172°48′00″E
Whau Valley Reservoir	Whangarei District		Northwest of Whangārei	35°42′30″S 174°17′10″E

=== Auckland ===
The following lakes are located in the Auckland Region.

Many of the lakes in the Auckland Region are man made reservoirs, constructed in the hilly catchment areas of the Waitakere and Hunua ranges in order to provide a water supply for the Auckland urban area.

Lake	Location	Area	Notes	Coordinates
Cosseys Reservoir	Auckland Region		Reservoir in Hunua Ranges	37°03′25″S 175°06′30″E
Crater Hill Lake	Auckland Region		Maar lake at Māngere	36°59′09″S 174°49′37″E
Lake Karaka	Auckland Region		On the South Kaipara Head	36°36′35″S 174°17′35″E
Lake Kawaupaku	Auckland Region		Dune lake southeast of Bethells Beach	36°53′40″S 174°27′30″E
Lake Kereta	Auckland Region		On the South Kaipara Head	36°35′35″S 174°16′50″E
Lake Kuwakatai	Auckland Region		On the South Kaipara Head	36°31′40″S 174°14′20″E
Lake Ngakaru	Auckland Region		On the South Kaipara Head	36°39′20″S 174°19′52″E
Lake Okaihau	Auckland Region		North of Muriwai Beach	36°48′35″S 174°26′25″E
Lake Paekawau	Auckland Region		Waipatukahu, north of Muriwai Beach	36°47′30″S 174°26′05″E
Lake Piripoua	Auckland Region		On the South Kaipara Head	36°39′43″S 174°20′12″E
Lake Pokorua	Auckland Region		On Āwhitu Peninsula	37°11′30″S 174°38′00″E
Lake Poutoa	Auckland Region		On the South Kaipara Head	36°38′14″S 174°19′23″E
Lake Pupuke	Auckland Region		Crater lake in Takapuna	36°47′00″S 174°46′00″E
Lake Rototoa	Auckland Region	1.39 km^{2}	Dune lake on the South Kaipara Head	36°30′45″S 174°14′15″E
Lake Waiataru	Auckland Region		Dune lake south of Bethells Beach	36°53′56″S 174°27′08″E
Lake Wainamu	Auckland Region		Dune lake east of Bethells Beach	36°53′20″S 174°28′00″E
Lake Whatihua	Auckland Region		Dune lake east of Waiuku on Āwhitu Peninsula	37°16′30″S 174°40′15″E
Lower Huia Reservoir	Auckland Region		Reservoir in southern Waitākere Ranges	36°59′00″S 174°34′00″E
Lower Nihotupu Reservoir	Auckland Region	0.53 km^{2}	Reservoir in southern Waitākere Ranges	36°57′30″S 174°36′45″E
Mangatangi Reservoir	Auckland Region		Reservoir in Hunua Ranges	37°06′30″S 175°12′30″E
Nihotupu Reservoir	Auckland Region		Reservoir	36°57′00″S 174°32′00″E
Pehiakura Lakes	Auckland Region		On Āwhitu Peninsula	37°10′55″S 174°36′55″E
Slipper Lake	Auckland Region		Dune lake south of Mangawhai	36°10′20″S 174°37′50″E
Spectacle Lake	Auckland Region		Dune lake south of Mangawhai	36°10′50″S 174°37′50″E
Tomarata Lake	Auckland Region		Dune lake south of Mangawhai	36°11′40″S 174°39′00″E
Upper Huia Reservoir	Auckland Region		Reservoir in southern Waitākere Ranges	36°57′50″S 174°32′10″E
Upper Mangatawhiri Reservoir	Auckland Region		Reservoir in Hunua Ranges	37°04′30″S 175°09′15″E
Upper Nihotupu Reservoir	Auckland Region	0.125 km^{2}	Reservoir in southern Waitākere Ranges	36°57′00″S 174°33′50″E
Wairoa Reservoir	Auckland Region		Reservoir in Hunua Ranges	37°05′30″S 175°07′50″E
Waitākere Reservoir	Auckland Region	0.25 km^{2}	Reservoir in northern Waitākere Ranges	36°54′20″S 174°31′25″E

=== Waikato ===
The following lakes are located in the Waikato region. The various pools of the Tongariro River system, as listed below, can be found in detail on their own page at Pools of the Tongariro River.

Lake	Location	Area	Notes	Coordinates
Alum Lake	Taupō District	0.08 km^{2}	West of Wairakei	38°37′05″S 176°03′40″E
Blue Lake	Tongariro N.P.	0.17 km^{2}	On Mount Tongariro. Watershed of 0.71 km^{2}	39°07′30″S 175°39′40″E
Champagne Pool	Southern Rotorua Lakes		Fed from a hot spring	38°21′33″S 176°22′08″E
Emerald Lakes	Tongariro N.P.	0.01 km^{2}	On Mount Tongariro. Watershed of 2.64 km^{2}	39°08′05″S 175°39′15″E
Hamareha Lakes	South Waikato District	0.01 km^{2}	Watershed of 10.55 km^{2}	38°01′45″S 175°52′50″E
Hardcastle Lagoon	Taupō District		Oxbow lake of Waikato River	38°30′40″S 176°19′40″E
Hendersons Pond	Waipa District	0.0088 km^{2}	Peat lake. Watershed of 0.31 km^{2}	37°53′27″S 175°16′27″E
Horseshoe Lake (Lake Waiwhakareke)	Hamilton City	0.03 km^{2}	Drains into Lake Rotokauri. Watershed of 0.66 km^{2}	37°46′14″S 175°13′33″E
Kopuatai Burn Pools	Hauraki District	0.02 km^{2}	Peat lakes on Kopuatai Peat Dome. Watershed of 1.83 km^{2}	37°24′30″S 175°36′00″E
Lake A (Lake Whakatangi)	Waikato District	0.027 km^{2}	Peat lake. Watershed of 1.7 km^{2}	37°41′20″S 175°15′30″E
Lake Arapuni	South Waikato and Waipa Districts	9 km^{2}	Hydroelectric reservoir, aquatic vegetation monitored	38°08′00″S 175°38′00″E
Lake Aratiatia	Taupō District	0.60 km^{2}	Hydroelectric reservoir, aquatic vegetation monitored. Watershed of 1,478.8 km^{2}	38°37′00″S 176°07′55″E
Lake Areare	Waikato District	0.33 km^{2}	East of Ngāruawāhia. Peat lake, aquatic vegetation monitored. Watershed of 2.62 km^{2}	37°40′05″S 175°12′00″E
Lake Ātiamuri	South Waikato and Taupō Districts	2.3 km^{2}	Hydroelectric reservoir, aquatic vegetation monitored.	38°23′10″S 176°02′00″E
Lake B (or Lake Kaituna)	Waikato District	0.12 km^{2}	Peat lake, aquatic vegetation monitored. Watershed of 5.8 km^{2}	37°40′45″S 175°14′50″E
Lake C (or Lake Komakorau)	Waikato District	0.026 km^{2}	Restoration study done. Watershed of 6.19 km^{2}	37°40′30″S 175°14′43″E
Lake Cameron (Lake Kareaotahi)	Waipa District	0.034 km^{2}	Peat lake. Watershed of 0.31 km^{2}	37°51′20″S 175°18′10″E
Lake D (Lake Kainui)	Waikato District	0.25 km^{2}	Peat lake, aquatic vegetation monitored. Watershed of 1.32 km^{2}	37°40′40″S 175°14′00″E
Lake Disappear	Waikato District	up to 2 km long when full	Seasonal. Pakihi Stream dammed by lava flow (which also formed Bridal Veil waterfall) and drained through limestone sinkhole (see also Turlough and Polje). Watershed of 6.0 km^{2}	37°55′35″S 174°55′02″E
Lake E (Lake Tunawhakaheke)	Waikato District	0.067 km^{2}	Peat lake, aquatic vegetation monitored. Watershed of 1.0 km^{2} See Lake Rototuna	37°42′08″S 175°16′15″E
Lake Hakanoa	Waikato District	0.52 km^{2}	riverine lake, aquatic vegetation monitored. Watershed of 6.13 km^{2}	37°33′10″S 175°10′00″E
Lake Harihari	Waitomo District	0.184 km^{2}	Sand dune lake (see Lake Ototoa), aquatic vegetation monitored. Watershed of 1.34 km^{2}	38°12′40″S 174°43′20″E
Lake Hinemaiaia	Taupō District	0.12 km^{2}	Hydroelectric reservoir, aquatic vegetation monitored	38°53′30″S 176°05′40″E
Lake Hotoananga	Waikato District	0.19 km^{2}	East of Ngāruawāhia. Peat lake, aquatic vegetation monitored. Watershed of 0.71 km^{2}	37°39′25″S 175°11′00″E
Lake Karapiro	Waipa District	7.7 km^{2}	Hydroelectric reservoir, aquatic vegetation monitored	37°56′40″S 175°34′00″E
Lake Kimihia	Waikato District	0.58 km^{2}	riverine lake, aquatic vegetation monitored. Watershed of 14.85 km^{2}	37°31′40″S 175°11′30″E
Lake Kopuera	Waikato District	0.52 km^{2}	Near Rangiriri. Watershed of 2.5 km^{2}	37°25′25″S 175°08′15″E
Lake Koraha	Ōtorohanga District	0.008 km^{2}	Drains via a small cave. Watershed of 1.768 km^{2}	38°09′49″S 174°55′19″E
Lake Koromatua	Waipa District	0.099 km^{2}	Eutrophic lake 0.22 km^{2} total area, aquatic vegetation monitored. Watershed of 2.0 km^{2}	37°50′15″S 175°13′25″E
Lake Kuratau	Taupō District	1.03 km^{2}	Hydroelectric reservoir. Watershed of 183.67 km^{2}	38°52′05″S 175°42′40″E
Lake Mangahia	Waipa District	0.084 km^{2}	Peat lake, aquatic vegetation monitored. Watershed of 3.54 km^{2}	37°52′45″S 175°13′40″E
Lake Mangakaware	Waipa District	0.129 km^{2}	Peat lake, aquatic vegetation monitored. Watershed of 2.38 km^{2}	37°56′00″S 175°13′12″E
Lake Maraetai	South Waikato and Taupō Districts	4.4 km^{2}	Hydroelectric reservoir, aquatic vegetation monitored	38°22′00″S 175°47′10″E
Lake Maratoto	Waipa District	0.18 km^{2}	Peat lake, aquatic vegetation monitored. Watershed of 0.88 km^{2}	37°53′10″S 175°18′15″E
Lake Milicich	Waipa District	0.022 km^{2}	Peat lake, aquatic vegetation monitored. Watershed of 0.54 km^{2}	37°53′07″S 175°14′55″E
Lake Moananui	South Waikato District	0.08 km^{2}	Watershed of 27.06 km^{2}	38°14′10″S 175°51′10″E
Lake Ngāhewa	Southern Rotorua Lakes	0.084 km^{2}	Volcanic, aquatic vegetation monitored. Watershed of 7.46 km^{2}	38°18′55″S 176°22′25″E
Lake Ngakoro	Southern Rotorua Lakes	0.12 km^{2}	Geothermal. Watershed of 2.35 km^{2}	38°21′55″S 176°22′03″E
Lake Ngapouri (Lake Opouri)	Southern Rotorua Lakes	0.235 km^{2}	Volcanic. Watershed of 6.36 km^{2}	38°20′20″S 176°20′05″E
Lake Ngaroto	Waipa District	1.08 km^{2}	Peat lake, aquatic vegetation monitored. Watershed of 18.46 km^{2}	37°57′20″S 175°17′20″E
Lake Ngarotoiti	Waipa District	0.034 km^{2}	Peat lake. Watershed of 5.04 km^{2}	37°56′35″S 175°17′45″E
Lake Numiti	Waitomo District	0.158 km^{2}	Near Taharoa	38°10′45″S 174°43′45″E
Lake Ohakuri	South Waikato and Taupō Districts	12 km^{2}	Hydroelectric reservoir, aquatic vegetation monitored	38°25′00″S 176°07′00″E
Lake Ohinewai	Waikato District	0.16 km^{2}	Peat lake, aquatic vegetation monitored. Watershed of 3.47 km^{2}	37°29′40″S 175°10′20″E
Lake Okoroire	South Waikato District	0.035 km^{2}	Peat lake. Watershed of 1.47 km^{2}	37°55′05″S 175°47′25″E
Lake Okowhao	Waikato District	0.21 km^{2}	riverine lake, aquatic vegetation monitored	37°31′35″S 175°08′30″E
Lake Opuatia	Waikato District	0.07 km^{2} approx	Peat lake	37°26′07″S 175°03′48″E
Lake Orotu	Southern Rotorua Lakes		Volcanic. Watershed of 5.82 km^{2}	38°22′15″S 176°21′53″E
Lake Otamatearoa	Waikato District	0.049 km^{2}	Sand dune lake, aquatic vegetation monitored. Watershed of 0.683 km^{2}	37°17′45″S 174°41′10″E
Lake Parangi	Ōtorohanga District	0.122 km^{2}	North of Kawhia Harbour. Sand dune lake, aquatic vegetation monitored. Watershed of 1.22 km^{2}	38°02′15″S 174°48′40″E
Lake Pataka	Waipa District	0.046 km^{2}	Peat lake, aquatic vegetation monitored. Watershed of 0.55 km^{2}	37°50′50″S 175°13′10″E
Lake Pataka South (Lake Posa)	Waipa District	0.0205 km^{2}	Peat lake, aquatic vegetation monitored. Watershed of 0.95 km^{2}	37°51′05″S 175°13′00″E
Lake Patetonga	Hauraki District	0.049 km^{2}	Artificial tidal lake with sluice, for duck shooting	37°24′00″S 175°31′00″E
Lake Penewaka (Penewaka Lagoon)	Waikato District	0.04 km^{2}	In Lake Waikare wildlife management reserve	37°26′10″S 175°09′35″E
Lake Pikopiko	Waikato District	0.064	East of Ngāruawāhia. Watershed of 0.94 km^{2}	37°39′45″S 175°11′33″E
Lake Piopio	Waitomo District	0.002 km^{2}	Sand dune lake near Taharoa. Watershed of 0.28 km^{2}	38°11′39″S 174°43′07″E
Lake Puketi	Waikato District	0.059 km^{2}	Sand dune lake, aquatic vegetation monitored. Watershed of 1.141 km^{2}	37°16′45″S 174°40′35″E
Lake Puketirini	Waikato District	1.04 km^{2}	Weavers opencast coal-mine until December 1993	37°34′00″S 175°08′30″E
Lake Rotoaira	Taupō District	13 km^{2}	Volcanic, aquatic vegetation monitored. Watershed of 141.9 km^{2}	39°03′30″S 175°43′00″E
Lake Rotohoko	South Waikato District			38°03′50″S 175°56′07″E
Lake Rotoiti	Waikato District	0.012 km^{2}	Sand dune lake, aquatic vegetation monitored. Watershed of 0.4193 km^{2}	37°16′42″S 174°40′30″E
Lake Rotokaeo	Hamilton City	0.031 km^{2}	Peat lake	37°46′25″S 175°15′05″E
Lake Rotokaraka	Waikato District	0.07 km^{2} approx		37°36′38″S 175°20′15″E
Lake Rotokauri	Hamilton City	0.42 km^{2}	Near Rotokauri, aquatic vegetation monitored. Watershed of 9.33 km^{2}	37°45′40″S 175°11′50″E
Lake Rotokawa	Taupō District	0.62 km^{2}	Geothermal lake northeast of Taupō. Watershed of 10.9 km^{2}	38°37′50″S 176°11′20″E
Lake Rotokawau	Waikato District	0.22 km^{2}	Peat lake linked to Lake Waikare, aquatic vegetation monitored. Watershed of 18.04 km^{2}	37°28′50″S 175°11′30″E
Lake Rotokura	Taupō District			39°00′45″S 175°39′40″E
Lake Rotokotuku	Waitomo District	0.011 km^{2}	Peat lake southeast of Te Kūiti. Watershed of 0.185 km^{2}	38°22′02″S 175°12′50″E
Lake Rotomanuka	Waipa District	0.123 km^{2} (North) 0.054 km^{2} (South)	Peat lake, aquatic vegetation monitored. Watershed of 4.79 km^{2}	37°55′30″S 175°18′55″E
Lake Rotongaio	Taupō District	0.34 km^{2}	Volcanic lake immediately to the east of Lake Taupō. Watershed of 5.06 km^{2}	38°48′30″S 176°03′20″E
Lake Rotongaro	Waikato District	2.92 km^{2}	riverine lake, aquatic vegetation monitored. Watershed of 19.5 km^{2}	37°29′10″S 175°07′00″E
Lake Rotongaroiti	Waikato District	0.23 km^{2}	riverine lake, aquatic vegetation monitored. Watershed of 21.05 km^{2}	37°28′40″S 175°06′30″E
Lake Rotongata	Waipa District	0.053 km^{2}	Peat lake. Watershed of 1.44 km^{2}	38°07′50″S 175°35′37″E
Lake Rotopotaka	Waipa District	0.028 km^{2}	Peat lake. Watershed of 0.76 km^{2}	37°57′57″S 175°19′37″E
Lake Rotopounamu	Tongariro N.P.	0.055 km^{2}	Crater lake north of Lake Rotoaira. Aquatic vegetation monitored. Watershed of 5.25 km^{2}	39°01′40″S 175°44′20″E
Lake Rotoroa (Hamilton)	Hamilton City	0.55 km^{2}	Peat lake, aquatic vegetation monitored. Watershed of 2.58 km^{2}	37°48′00″S 175°16′30″E
Lake Rotoroa	Waitomo District	0.224 km^{2}		38°11′00″S 174°43′30″E
Lake Rototapu	Waitomo District	0.02 km^{2}	Sand dune lake near Taharoa. Watershed of 0.28 km^{2}	38°11′45″S 174°43′03″E
Lake Ruatuna	Waipa District	0.13 km^{2}	Peat lake, aquatic vegetation monitored. Watershed of 1.9 km^{2}	37°55′40″S 175°17′30″E
Lake Serpentine (Rotopiko)	Waipa District	0.053 km^{2} (north) 0.083 km^{2} (south) 0.016 km^{2} (east)	Peat lake, aquatic vegetation monitored. Watershed of 1.63 km^{2}	37°57′00″S 175°19′05″E
Lake Taharoa	Waitomo District	2.16 km^{2}	Sand dune lake, aquatic vegetation monitored	38°10′00″S 174°44′30″E
Lake Taupō (Taupōmoana)	Taupō District	616 km^{2}	Crater lake, aquatic vegetation monitored. New Zealand's largest lake.	38°48′00″S 175°54′00″E
Lake Te Kapa	Waikato District	0.01 km^{2}	Peat lake	37°27′33″S 175°05′58″E
Lake Te Ko Utu (Te Koutu Lake)	Waipa District	0.06 km^{2}	Oxbow lake in Cambridge. Watershed of 4.16 km^{2}	37°53′20″S 175°28′10″E
Lake Te Rotopupu	Ōtorohanga District	0.0095 km^{2}	Small sand dune lake immediately south of Kawhia Harbour. Watershed of 2.4 km^{2}	38°06′15″S 174°52′30″E
Lake Tutaeinanga	Southern Rotorua Lakes	0.031 km^{2}	Volcanic, aquatic vegetation monitored. Watershed of 5.01 km^{2}	38°20′00″S 176°19′20″E
Lake Waahi	Waikato District	5.22 km^{2}	riverine lake, aquatic vegetation monitored. Watershed of 92.21 km^{2}	37°33′30″S 175°07′30″E
Lake Waikare	Waikato District	34 km^{2}	riverine lake, aquatic vegetation monitored. Watershed of 210 km^{2}	37°26′00″S 175°12′00″E
Lake Waipapa	South Waikato and Waipa Districts	1.5 km^{2}	Hydroelectric reservoir, aquatic vegetation monitored. Watershed of 254.09 km^{2}	38°18′00″S 175°41′00″E
Lake Waitamoumou	Waikato District	0.024 km^{2}	Sand dune lake (see Lake Ototoa).	37°47′25″S 174°50′38″E
Lake Waiwhata	Waikato District	0.089 km^{2}	Peat lake	37°27′55″S 175°06′05″E
Lake Whatihua	Waikato District		Near the border of Waikato and Auckland.	37°16′31″S 174°40′14.2″E
Lake Whakamaru	South Waikato and Waipa Districts	7.80 km^{2}	Hydroelectric reservoir, aquatic vegetation monitored. Watershed of 811.48 km^{2}	38°26′20″S 175°50′00″E
Lake Whangape	Waikato District	14.5 km^{2}	riverine lake, aquatic vegetation monitored. Watershed of 317 km^{2}	37°28′00″S 175°03′30″E
Leesons Pond	Matamata-Piako District	0.04 km^{2} approx	Peat lake	37°38′20″S 175°27′50″E
Opal Lake	Southern Rotorua Lakes			38°18′39″S 176°23′17″E
Parkinsons Lake (Kohahuake)	Waikato District	0.0192 km^{2}	Eutrophic sand dune lake, aquatic vegetation monitored. Watershed of 1.077 km^{2}	37°18′53″S 174°41′05″E
Pukuriri Lagoon	Taupō District		Small wetland area east of Taupō	38°44′12″S 176°17′15″E
Rotowhero (Green Lake)	Southern Rotorua Lakes	0.026 km^{2}	Geothermal. Watershed of 11.01 km^{2}	38°19′20″S 176°22′27″E
Sulphur Lagoon	Tongariro N.P.	0.02 km^{2}	Volcanic. Watershed of 1.97 km^{2}	39°06′12″S 175°40′20″E
Te Otamanui Lagoon	Waikato District	0.054 km^{2}	Alluvial and pumice dammed valley	37°43′20″S 175°08′08″E
Turnwald Pond	Waipa District			37°55′05″S 175°18′43″E
Whangioterangi (Echo Lake)	Southern Rotorua Lakes	0.05 km^{2}	Geothermal. Watershed of 0.70 km^{2}.	38°21′39″S 176°22′30″E
Whiritoa Lagoon	Thames-Coromandel District		At Whiritoa	37°17′30″S 175°54′30″E

==== Pools of the Tongariro River ====
The following is a list of named pools on the Tongariro River. Full details of these pools, many of which are little more than widenings of the river or clear areas of the river's delta marshes, can be found at Pools of the Tongariro River.

- Admirals Pool
- Bain Pool
- Barlows Pool
- Beggs Pool
- Big Bend Pool
- Blue Pool
- Boulder Pool
- Breakaway Pool
- Breakfast Pool
- Cattle Rustlers Pool
- Cherry Pool
- Cliff Pool
- Cobham Pool
- Dans Pool
- DeLatours Pool
- Downs Pool
- Duchess Pool
- Fan Pool
- Fence Pool
- Graces Pool
- Hydro Pool
- Island Pool
- Jellicoe Pool
- Jones Pool
- Judges Pool
- Kamahi Pool
- Log Pool
- Lonely Pool
- Lower Birch Pool
- Major Jones Pool
- Never Fail Pool
- Poplar Pool
- Poutu Pool
- Red Hut Pool
- Reed Pool
- Sand Pool
- Shag Pool
- Silly Pool
- Stag Pool
- Swirl Pool
- The Bends Pool
- The Rip
- Upper Birch Pool
- Upper Island Pool
- Waddells Pool
- Whitikau Pool

=== Bay of Plenty ===
The following lakes are located in the Bay of Plenty Region.

Lake	Location	Area	Notes	Coordinates
Arohaki Lagoon (formerly Arahaki Lagoon)	Whakatāne District			38°40′50″S 176°39′40″E
Crater Lake	Whakaari / White Island			37°31′16″S 177°11′03″E
Flaxy Lake	Whakatāne District			38°39′30″S 176°33′15″E
Frying Pan Lake	Rotorua Lakes		Southwest of Lake Rotomahana in Waimangu Volcanic Rift Valley	38°17′00″S 176°23′40″E
Green Lake	Rotorua Lakes		Close to eastern shore of Lake Rotomahana. Not to be confused with Lake Rotokakahi (Green Lake)	38°15′00″S 176°28′18″E
Hinemoa Pool (Waikimihia)	Rotorua Lakes		On Mokoia Island in Lake Rotorua	38°05′09″S 176°17′19″E
Inferno Crater Lake	Rotorua Lakes		Southwest of Lake Rotomahana in Waimangu Volcanic Rift Valley	38°16′55″S 176°24′00″E
Lake Āniwaniwa (formerly Lake Aniwhenua)	Whakatāne District	2.55 km^{2}		38°19′30″S 176°47′20″E
Lake Aroarotamahine (Green Lake)	Mayor Island / Tuhua			37°17′00″S 176°16′05″E
Lake Mangatutara	Ōpōtiki District			37°53′28″S 177°53′52″E
Lake Matahina	Whakatāne District		Hydroelectric lake on the Rangitaiki River	38°07′30″S 176°49′00″E
Lake Maui	Rotorua Lakes		East of Lake Rotorua	38°05′04″S 176°20′48″E
Lake McLaren	Western Bay of Plenty District			37°48′45″S 176°02′30″E
Lake Ngawhero	Rotorua Lakes		South of Lake Rotoiti	38°02′15″S 176°23′40″E
Lake Okareka	Rotorua Lakes			38°10′20″S 176°22′00″E
Lake Okaro	Rotorua Lakes		Southwest of Lake Rotomahana	38°18′00″S 176°23′40″E
Lake Ōkataina	Rotorua Lakes			38°08′00″S 176°24′30″E
Lake Onerahi	Whakatāne District			38°03′53″S 176°45′46″E
Lake Otumahi	Whakatāne District			38°01′40″S 176°51′05″E
Lake Pouarua	Eastern Taupō District			38°57′50″S 176°23′40″E
Lake Pupuwharau	Kawerau District			38°05′20″S 176°43′00″E
Lake Rerewhakaaitu	Rotorua Lakes		Southeast of Lake Rotomahana	38°18′00″S 176°30′00″E
Lake Rotoatua	Rotorua Lakes		South of Lake Rotoiti	38°04′25″S 176°25′45″E
Lake Rotoehu	Rotorua Lakes			38°01′30″S 176°32′00″E
Lake Rotoiti	Rotorua Lakes	35 km^{2}		38°02′00″S 176°25′00″E
Lake Rotoitipaku	Whakatāne District		North of Kawerau	38°03′30″S 176°42′45″E
Lake Rotokakahi (Green Lake)	Rotorua Lakes		Not to be confused with Green Lake near Lake Rotomahana	38°13′00″S 176°19′00″E
Lake Rotokawa	Rotorua Lakes		East of Lake Rotorua. Not to be confused with the nearby Lake Rotokawau	38°06′45″S 176°19′15″E
Lake Rotokawau	Rotorua Lakes		East of Lake Rotorua. Not to be confused with the nearby Lake Rotokawa	38°04′20″S 176°22′40″E
Lake Rotomā	Rotorua Lakes			38°03′00″S 176°35′00″E
Lake Rotomahana	Rotorua Lakes			38°16′00″S 176°26′00″E
Lake Rotongata (Mirror Lake)	Rotorua Lakes		South of Lake Rotoiti	38°04′25″S 176°25′18″E
Lake Rotoroa	Whakatāne District			38°02′30″S 176°42′50″E
Lake Rotorua	Rotorua Lakes	79 km^{2}		38°05′00″S 176°16′00″E
Lake Tahuna	Whakatāne District			38°04′40″S 176°44′20″E
Lake Taikehu	Whakatāne District			38°02′32″S 176°50′33″E
Lake Tamurenui	Whakatāne District			38°01′40″S 176°43′45″E
Lake Tarawera	Rotorua Lakes	39 km^{2}		38°12′00″S 176°25′00″E
Lake Te Hapua	Rotorua Lakes		North of Lake Rotoiti	38°01′25″S 176°26′05″E
Lake Te Paritu (Black Lake)	Mayor Island / Tuhua			37°17′30″S 176°16′00″E
Lake Te Rotoroniu	Rotorua Lakes		East of Lake Ōkataina	38°08′38″S 176°27′47″E
Lake Tikitapu (Blue Lake)	Rotorua Lakes			38°11′40″S 176°20′00″E
Lake Waikoura	Matakana Island			37°28′57″S 175°59′50″E
Matata Lagoon	Whakatāne District			37°53′15″S 176°45′30″E
Southern Crater Lake	Rotorua Lakes		Southwest of Lake Rotomahana in Waimangu Volcanic Rift Valley	38°17′10″S 176°23′25″E
Te Matahi Lagoon	Rotorua Lakes		Southeast of Lake Rotomā	38°03′45″S 176°36′20″E
Te Onewhero Lagoon	Rotorua Lakes		East of Lake Rotomā	38°02′25″S 176°36′00″E
Te Whekau Lagoon	Rotorua Lakes		Northwest of Lake Tarawera	38°10′00″S 176°22′55″E
Whakarewa Lagoon	Rotorua Lakes		East of Lake Rotomā	38°02′05″S 176°35′55″E

=== Gisborne ===
The following lakes are located in the Gisborne Region.

Lake	Location	Area	Notes	Coordinates
Lake Karangata	Gisborne District		Between Gisborne and Wairoa, south of the Tiniroto Lakes	38°46′20″S 177°32′40″E
Lake Repongaere	Gisborne District		North of Patutahi	38°35′45″S 177°52′30″E
Lake Rotokaha	Gisborne District		Between Gisborne and Wairoa, southeast of the Tiniroto Lakes	38°46′30″S 177°33′30″E
Otopotehetehe Lake	Gisborne District		West of Hicks Bay	37°36′55″S 178°08′20″E
Lake Te Horonui	Gisborne District	30 ha (74 acres)	On the Hawke's Bay region boundary, with a smaller Lake Tukemokihi just downstream	38°50′47″S 177°39′47″E
Tiniroto Lakes	Gisborne District		Between Gisborne and Wairoa	38°46′05″S 177°32′30″E
Wherowhero Lagoon	Gisborne District		Close to Muriwai at the south end of Poverty Bay	38°44′30″S 177°56′10″E

=== Hawke's Bay ===
The following lakes are located in the Hawke's Bay Region.

Lake	Location	Area	Notes	Coordinates
Awamate Lagoons	Wairoa District		South of Frasertown	38°59′20″S 177°23′40″E
Blue Lake	Hastings District			39°09′44″S 176°49′03″E
Hatuma Lake (Lake Whatumā)	Central Hawke's Bay District		South of Waipukurau	40°01′20″S 176°31′30″E
Hikaka	Wairoa District		Southeast of Lake Waikaremoana	38°48′48″S 177°06′55″E
Hine Rere	Wairoa District		Northeast of Lake Waikaremoana	38°42′50″S 177°08′19″E
Horseshoe Lake	Central Hawke's Bay District		West of Elsthorpe	39°55′20″S 176°45′45″E
Kaipo Lagoon	Wairoa District		Northeast of Lake Waikaremoana	38°40′55″S 177°12′05″E
Lake Horotea	Northeast Rangitikei District			39°17′45″S 176°08′40″E
Lake Kaitawa	Wairoa District		Southeast of Lake Waikaremoana	38°48′10″S 177°08′10″E
Lake Kiriopukae	Wairoa District		Southeast of Lake Waikaremoana	38°48′23″S 177°06′45″E
Lake Opouahi	Hastings District			39°08′50″S 176°50′10″E
Lake Orakai	Hastings District		South of Lake Tūtira	39°14′10″S 176°53′20″E
Lake Pohue	Hastings District			39°15′00″S 176°41′10″E
Lake Poukawa	Hastings District	1.4 km^{2}		39°47′00″S 176°42′00″E
Lake Rotongaio	Wairoa District			38°56′35″S 177°00′40″E
Lake Rotonuiaha	Wairoa District	0.44 km^{2}		38°56′50″S 177°02′20″E
Lake Rotoroa	Wairoa District			38°56′50″S 177°01′45″E
Lake Ruapani	Wairoa District		Northeast of Lake Waikaremoana	38°43′50″S 177°07′40″E
Lake Ruapapa	Wairoa District			38°55′20″S 177°09′30″E
Lake Tamaharau	Wairoa District			39°02′38″S 177°01′48″E
Lake Tūtira	Hastings District	1.8 km^{2}	North of Napier	39°13′30″S 176°53′35″E
Lake Waikareiti	Wairoa District		Northeast of Lake Waikaremoana	38°43′00″S 177°10′00″E
Lake Waikaremoana	Wairoa District	54 km^{2}		38°46′00″S 177°05′00″E
Lake Waikopiro	Hastings District		South of Lake Tūtira	39°14′05″S 176°53′40″E
Lake Whakamarino	Wairoa District		Southeast of Lake Waikaremoana	38°48′40″S 177°09′00″E
Lake Whalehole	Hastings District			39°31′42″S 176°13′50″E
Lake Wherowhero	Wairoa District		Southeast of Lake Waikaremoana	38°48′20″S 177°07′47″E
Long Range Lake	Central Hawke's Bay District			40°08′05″S 176°46′35″E
Maungawhio Lagoon	Wairoa District		At isthmus of Māhia Peninsula	39°04′10″S 177°53′00″E
Mauriahea	Wairoa District		Southeast of Lake Waikaremoana	38°49′22″S 177°07′25″E
Nga Whanau A Ruapani Tarns	Wairoa District		North of Lake Waikaremoana	38°42′50″S 177°06′30″E
Ngamotu Lagoon	Wairoa District		East of the mouth of the Wairoa River	39°03′30″S 177°26′30″E
Ngutu Manu	Wairoa District		Northeast of Lake Waikaremoana	38°42′57″S 177°08′18″E
Ohuia Lagoon	Wairoa District		East of Wairoa	39°02′50″S 177°29′00″E
Ōingo Lake	Hastings District	0.8 km^{2}	Southwest of Napier	39°33′45″S 176°45′00″E
Pakiaka	Wairoa District		Southeast of Lake Waikaremoana	38°49′13″S 177°07′13″E
Potaka	Wairoa District		Southeast of Lake Waikaremoana. Not to be confused with Potaka Lake	38°49′22″S 177°07′48″E
Potaka Lake	Hastings District		Southwest of Napier. Not to be confused with Potaka	39°34′40″S 176°44′50″E
Purimu Lake	Central Hawke's Bay District			40°08′20″S 176°29′00″E
Rūnanga Lake	Hastings District	1.1 km^{2}	Southwest of Napier	39°34′40″S 176°42′20″E
Te Paeroa Lagoon	Wairoa District		East of Wairoa	39°02′35″S 177°31′00″E
Te Roto Kare	Hastings District		Southwest of Napier	39°33′45″S 176°47′50″E
Te Rotookiwa	Central Hawke's Bay District			39°49′05″S 176°39′35″E
Te Whakatutu	Wairoa District		Southeast of Lake Waikaremoana	38°49′00″S 177°08′12″E
The Lakes	Hastings District			39°21′40″S 176°21′50″E
Umuomahu	Wairoa District		Southeast of Lake Waikaremoana	38°49′18″S 177°06′30″E
Wairau Lagoon	Wairoa District		East of Wairoa	39°02′50″S 177°30′00″E
Whakakī Lagoon	Wairoa District	4.7 km^{2}	East of Wairoa	39°02′35″S 177°33′00″E
Whakamahi Lagoon	Wairoa District		West of the mouth of the Wairoa River	39°03′50″S 177°24′20″E
Whano O Ruapani	Wairoa District		Northeast of Lake Waikaremoana	38°43′20″S 177°07′30″E

=== Taranaki ===
The following lakes are located in the Taranaki Region.

Lake	Location	Area	Notes	Coordinates
Lake Dive	Egmont N.P.		South of the peak of Mount Taranaki	39°20′08″S 174°03′30″E
Lake Herengawe	South Taranaki District		South of Waverley	39°47′35″S 174°38′25″E
Lake Mangamahoe	New Plymouth District		Between New Plymouth and Inglewood	39°07′20″S 174°07′30″E
Lake Mangawhio	South Taranaki District			39°39′10″S 174°47′35″E
Lake Moumahaki	South Taranaki District			39°41′20″S 174°40′10″E
Lake Okoia	South Taranaki District		Southeast of Waverley	39°49′10″S 174°41′10″E
Lake Oturi	South Taranaki District		South of Waverley	39°46′45″S 174°37′15″E
Lake Ratapiko	New Plymouth District		South of Ratapiko	39°12′20″S 174°19′40″E
Lake Rotokare	South Taranaki District		Not to be confused with Rotokare/Barrett Lagoon	39°27′00″S 174°24′40″E
Lake Rotokohu	South Taranaki District			39°31′04″S 174°47′02″E
Lake Rotomanu	New Plymouth		Close to the mouth of the Waiwhakaiho River	39°02′30″S 174°06′50″E
Lake Rotorangi	South Taranaki District		Artificial lake (hydroelectric) behind the Pātea Dam on the Pātea River	39°32′00″S 174°33′40″E
Lake Waiau	South Taranaki District		Southeast of Waverley	39°47′40″S 174°40′50″E
Lake Waikare	South Taranaki District			39°40′10″S 174°48′20″E
Lake Waikato	South Taranaki District			39°49′45″S 174°47′15″E
Murphys Lake	Egmont N.P.		Southeast of Dawson Falls	39°20′10″S 174°07′01″E
Rotokare/Barrett Lagoon	New Plymouth		South of the New Plymouth urban area. Not to be confused with Lake Rotokare	39°05′30″S 174°02′30″E
Tapuarau Lagoon	South Taranaki District		Close to the mouth of the Waitōtara River	39°50′28″S 174°40′45″E
Waipu Lagoons	New Plymouth District		Near Bell Block	39°01′45″S 174°08′10″E

=== Manawatū-Whanganui ===
The following lakes are located in the Manawatū-Whanganui region.

Lake	Location	Area	Notes	Coordinates
Coe's Hole	Whanganui District		Between the mouths of the Whanganui and Whangaehu Rivers	39°58′13″S 175°04′23″E
Crater Lake	Tongariro N.P.		Mount Ruapehu	39°16′55″S 175°33′55″E
Kaitoke Lake	Whanganui District	0.253 km^{2}	Between the mouths of the Whanganui and Whangaehu Rivers	39°57′45″S 175°04′25″E
Karere Lagoon	Palmerston North		Oxbow lake southwest of city	40°24′10″S 175°31′37″E
Lake Alice	Rangitikei District	0.11 km^{2}	Northwest of Bulls	40°08′05″S 175°19′55″E
Lake Bernard	Rangitikei District	0.08 km^{2}	Northwest of Bulls	40°06′55″S 175°18′10″E
Lake Colenso (Kokopunui)	Rangitikei District			39°40′12″S 176°08′12″E
Lake Dudding	Rangitikei District	0.078 km^{2}	Northwest of Bulls	40°06′00″S 175°16′50″E
Lake Heaton	Rangitikei District	0.144 km^{2}	Northwest of Bulls	40°06′25″S 175°17′20″E
Lake Herbert	Rangitikei District	0.047 km^{2}	Northwest of Bulls	40°08′10″S 175°18′00″E
Lake Hickson	Rangitikei District		Northwest of Bulls	40°07′42″S 175°19′50″E
Lake Horowhenua	Horowhenua District		West of Levin	40°36′40″S 175°15′10″E
Lake Kaikokopu	Manawatu District		East of Himatangi Beach	40°22′30″S 175°15′50″E
Lake Kohata	Whanganui District	0.052 km^{2}	Between the mouths of the Whanganui and Whangaehu Rivers	39°58′20″S 175°04′50″E
Lake Koitiata	Rangitikei District	0.096 km^{2}	The lake is mainly fed and drained by groundwater	40°07′05″S 175°11′45″E
Lake Koputara	Horowhenua District		Southeast of Himatangi Beach	40°23′55″S 175°15′45″E
Lake Marahau	Whanganui District		West of Kai Iwi	39°50′45″S 174°49′15″E
Lake Maungarataiti	Rangitikei District		Northwest of Hunterville	39°54′30″S 175°30′50″E
Lake Maungaratanui	Rangitikei District		Northwest of Hunterville	39°54′40″S 175°31′10″E
Lake Meremere	Rangitikei District		In Turakina River valley	39°47′17″S 175°30′35″E
Lake Moawhango	Ruapehu District		Hydroelectric lake in Waiouru military area	39°23′30″S 175°45′00″E
Lake Namunamu	Rangitikei District		Northwest of Hunterville	39°53′10″S 175°27′55″E
Lake Ngaruru	Rangitikei District		Northwest of Hunterville	39°53′20″S 175°27′00″E
Lake Oraekomiko	Rangitikei District		East of Rātana Pā	40°02′55″S 175°09′45″E
Lake Otamangakau	Ruapehu District		Hydroelectric lake connected to Lakes Te Whaiau and Rotoaira by canals	39°00′10″S 175°37′20″E
Lake Otamataraha	Ruapehu District		South of Tangiwai	39°29′20″S 175°34′23″E
Lake Papaitonga	Horowhenua District		Southwest of Levin	40°38′40″S 175°13′30″E
Lake Pauri	Whanganui District	0.192 km^{2}	Between the mouths of the Whanganui and Whangaehu Rivers	39°58′40″S 175°06′00″E
Lake Pohoare (formerly Lake Hawkes)	Ruapehu District			39°09′12″S 175°10′45″E
Lake Poroa	Rangitikei District		Southeast of Taihape	39°45′05″S 175°52′05″E
Lake Pounamu	Rangitikei District		In Turakina River valley	39°47′18″S 175°30′24″E
Lake Rotokauwau	Whanganui District		Between the mouths of the Whanganui and Whangaehu Rivers	39°59′32″S 175°09′20″E
Lake Rotokura	Tongariro N.P.		East of Ohakune	39°25′40″S 175°31′10″E
Lake Rotorua	Rangitikei District		In Turakina River valley	39°47′03″S 175°30′47″E
Lake Surprise	Tongariro N.P.		West of Mount Ruapehu	39°17′30″S 175°30′00″E
Lake Te Whaiau	Ruapehu District		Hydroelectric lake connected to Lake Otamangakau by canal	39°01′03″S 175°36′25″E
Lake Vipan	Rangitikei District		Southeast of Turakina	40°05′30″S 175°15′15″E
Lake Waipu	Rangitikei District		East of Rātana Pā	40°02′40″S 175°09′20″E
Lake Waiwahi	Rangitikei District		In Turakina River valley	39°47′19″S 175°30′41″E
Lake Westmere	Whanganui District		Northwest of Whanganui	39°53′45″S 175°00′00″E
Lake William	Rangitikei District	0.068 km^{2}	Northwest of Bulls	40°07′20″S 175°18′35″E
Lake Wiritoa	Whanganui District	0.218 km^{2}	Between the mouths of the Whanganui and Whangaehu Rivers	39°58′30″S 175°05′20″E
Lower Tama	Tongariro N.P.		In crater between Mount Ruapehu and Mount Ngauruhoe	39°12′10″S 175°36′20″E
Mahangaiti Lake	Tararua District		Southeast of Dannevirke	40°14′50″S 176°07′30″E
Makirikiri Tarns	Rangitikei District			39°37′00″S 176°09′30″E
Mangahao Lower No. 2 Reservoir	Horowhenua District		Southeast of Shannon. Part of Mangahao Hydroelectric Scheme	40°36′15″S 175°29′30″E
Mangahao Upper No. 1 Reservoir	Horowhenua District		Southeast of Shannon. Part of Mangahao Hydroelectric Scheme	40°37′45″S 175°28′45″E
Marton Reservoirs	Rangitikei District		North of Marton	39°59′50″S 175°23′25″E
Ohinetonga Lagoon	Ruapehu District		East of Ōwhango	38°59′50″S 175°23′32″E
Omanuka Lagoon	Manawatu District		Southeast of Tangimoana	40°19′40″S 175°19′30″E
Pukepuke Lagoon	Manawatu District		Northeast of Himatangi Beach	40°20′30″S 175°15′55″E
Rotoataha Lake	Tararua District		Southeast of Dannevirke	40°20′43″S 176°10′40″E
Rotokawa	Tongariro N.P.		Southwest of Mount Ruapehu	39°19′54″S 175°30′18″E
Rotokawau Virginia Lake	Whanganui District		Whanganui	39°54′50″S 175°02′00″E
Tokomaru No. 3 Reservoir	Horowhenua District		Southeast of Shannon. Part of Mangahao Hydroelectric Scheme	40°35′15″S 175°28′55″E
Turitea Dams	Palmerston North		Southeast of city in Tararua Range	40°26′00″S 175°40′35″E
Upper Tama	Tongariro N.P.		In crater between Mount Ruapehu and Mount Ngauruhoe	39°11′10″S 175°37′20″E

=== Wellington ===
The following lakes are located in the Wellington Region.

Lake	Location	Area	Notes	Coordinates
Battery Pond	South Wairarapa District		Small lake northeast of Lake Pounui	41°20′03″S 175°07′16″E
Boggy Pond Lagoon	South Wairarapa District		East of Lake Wairarapa	41°15′20″S 175°16′00″E
Cannons Creek Lake	Porirua City		East of Porirua City Centre	41°08′30″S 174°52′03″E
Horseshoe Lagoon	South Wairarapa District		Oxbow lake beside Ruamāhanga River north of Martinborough	41°11′32″S 175°25′30″E
Lake Huritini	Kāpiti Coast District		Southeast of Waikawa Beach	40°42′15″S 175°09′20″E
Lake Kohangapiripiri	Lower Hutt City	0.116 km^{2}	Close to Pencarrow Head	41°21′40″S 174°51′25″E
Lake Kohangatera	Lower Hutt City		Close to Pencarrow Head	41°22′10″S 174°52′00″E
Lake Kopureherehere	Kāpiti Coast District			40°43′10″S 175°10′25″E
Lake Ngānoke	South Wairarapa District			41°21′20″S 175°11′10″E
Lake Onoke	South Wairarapa District		Lagoon at the mouth of the Ruamāhanga River	41°23′00″S 175°07′30″E
Lake Pounui	South Wairarapa District		Southwest of Lake Wairarapa	41°20′40″S 175°06′50″E
Lake Waiorongomai	Kāpiti Coast District		South of Waikawa Beach	40°42′45″S 175°08′35″E
Lake Wairarapa	South Wairarapa District	78 km^{2}		41°13′00″S 175°15′00″E
Lake Waitawa	Kāpiti Coast District		North of Ōtaki	40°43′30″S 175°10′15″E
Ngatotara Lagoon	Kāpiti Coast District			40°44′03″S 175°09′15″E
Ōkupe Lagoon	Kapiti Island		Close to the island's northern tip	40°49′35″S 174°56′50″E
Totara Lagoon	Kāpiti Coast District		Northwest of Waikanae	40°51′22″S 175°02′30″E
Waimeha Lagoon	Kāpiti Coast District		At the mouth of the Waikanae River	40°52′20″S 175°00′38″E
Whitby Lower Lake	Porirua City		North of Whitby Upper Lake	41°07′00″S 174°53′30″E
Whitby Upper Lake	Porirua City		South of Whitby Lower Lake	41°07′12″S 174°53′31″E

== South Island ==
=== Tasman ===
The following lakes are located in the Tasman Region.

Lake	Location	Area	Notes	Coordinates
Adelaide Tarn	Northern Kahurangi N.P.			40°56′30″S 172°32′40″E
Black Lakes	Western Kahurangi N.P.			41°22′20″S 172°18′00″E
Blue Lake	Nelson Lakes N.P.		North of Lake Constance. Reputedly the world's clearest fresh water lake.	42°03′35″S 172°39′30″E
Boulder Lake	Northern Kahurangi N.P.			40°53′40″S 172°34′45″E
Camp Lake	Central Kahurangi N.P.			41°04′33″S 172°31′35″E
Cleopatras Pool	Abel Tasman N.P.		Widening at the junction of the Torrent River and a minor tributary	40°57′22″S 173°02′14″E
Cobb Reservoir	Eastern Kahurangi N.P.		Not to be confused with Lake Cobb	41°07′15″S 172°39′30″E
Darby Pond	Northern Kahurangi N.P.		Southwest of Boulder Lake	40°54′03″S 172°34′10″E
Diamond Lake	Eastern Kahurangi N.P.		One of the Diamond Lakes north of Cobb Reservoir	41°05′10″S 172°36′40″E
Druggans Dam	Northwestern Tasman District			40°46′00″S 172°38′15″E
Hinapouri Tarn	Nelson Lakes N.P.		Between Lake Rotoroa and Lake Rotoiti	41°53′45″S 172°44′35″E
Iron Lake	Eastern Kahurangi N.P.		One of the Diamond Lakes north of Cobb Reservoir	41°06′20″S 172°36′55″E
Island Lake	Central Kahurangi N.P.		Feeds the Roaring Lion River	41°02′10″S 172°29′20″E
Kaihoka Lakes	Northwestern Tasman District		North of Whanganui Inlet	40°33′15″S 172°36′00″E
Kinzett Tarn	Southern Kahurangi N.P.			41°23′25″S 172°28′02″E
Lake Angelus	Nelson Lakes N.P.		In a cirque between Lake Rotoroa and Lake Rotoiti	41°53′15″S 172°44′45″E
Lake Aorere	Western Kahurangi N.P.			41°03′30″S 172°20′00″E
Lake Barfoot	Central Kahurangi N.P.			41°07′50″S 172°23′50″E
Lake Bellbird	Central Kahurangi N.P.			41°19′23″S 172°20′50″E
Lake Caslani	Southern Tasman District			41°53′55″S 172°15′55″E
Lake Clara	Northern Kahurangi N.P.		West of Boulder Lake	40°53′50″S 172°33′30″E
Lake Cobb	Central Kahurangi N.P.		Not to be confused with Cobb Reservoir	41°03′20″S 172°30′50″E
Lake Constance	Nelson Lakes N.P.			42°04′30″S 172°39′40″E
Lake Dora	Southwestern Tasman District		Northeast of Lake Perrine	41°31′45″S 172°11′02″E
Lake Ella	Nelson Lakes N.P.			42°05′40″S 172°35′20″E
Lake Elmer	Western Kahurangi N.P.			41°03′50″S 172°17′10″E
Lake Fiddle	Southwestern Tasman District		Mountain tarn northwest of Lake Phyllis	41°26′09″S 172°13′17″E
Lake Hanlon	Western Kahurangi N.P.			41°25′30″S 172°06′10″E
Lake Henderson	Central Kahurangi N.P.			41°04′30″S 172°30′35″E
Lake Jeanette	Southern Kahurangi N.P.			41°31′10″S 172°23′00″E
Lake Jewell	Central Kahurangi N.P.			41°09′05″S 172°23′00″E
Lake Killarney	Tākaka		A sinkhole filled with groundwater; no natural in- or outflows	40°51′08″S 172°48′30″E
Lake Lillie	Eastern Kahurangi N.P.		One of the Diamond Lakes north of Cobb Reservoir	41°05′40″S 172°36′40″E
Lake Lindsay	Eastern Kahurangi N.P.			40°59′05″S 172°38′10″E
Lake Lockett	Eastern Kahurangi N.P.		One of the Diamond Lakes north of Cobb Reservoir	41°04′50″S 172°37′30″E
Lake Marina	Southwestern Tasman District		South of Lake Phyllis on the Hemphill River	41°28′20″S 172°14′20″E
Lake Matiri	Southern Kahurangi N.P.			41°39′20″S 172°20′00″E
Lake Otuhie	Northwestern Tasman District			40°41′15″S 172°25′00″E
Lake Peel	Eastern Kahurangi N.P.		Southwest of Cobb Reservoir	41°08′45″S 172°36′10″E
Lake Perrine	Southwestern Tasman District		Widening of the Mōkihinui River	41°32′40″S 172°10′20″E
Lake Phyllis	Southwestern Tasman District		North of Lake Marina on the Hemphill River	41°27′50″S 172°14′20″E
Lake Rotoiti	Nelson Lakes N.P.			41°50′00″S 172°50′30″E
Lake Rotopai	Central Kahurangi N.P.			41°07′57″S 172°22′02″E
Lake Rotoroa	Nelson Lakes N.P.			41°52′00″S 172°39′00″E
Lake Sparrow	Eastern Kahurangi N.P.			40°58′35″S 172°37′00″E
Lake Stanley	Eastern Kahurangi N.P.			41°00′30″S 172°36′50″E
Lake Sylvester	Eastern Kahurangi N.P.		North of Cobb Reservoir	41°06′25″S 172°37′45″E
Lake William	Western Kahurangi N.P.		Mountain tarn	41°25′07″S 172°13′40″E
Little Sylvester Lake	Eastern Kahurangi N.P.		North of Cobb Reservoir	41°06′40″S 172°37′30″E
Luna Lake	Southern Kahurangi N.P.			41°24′40″S 172°27′50″E
Mirror Tarn	Western Kahurangi N.P.		Small tarn above the Oparara River	41°08′48″S 172°11′58″E
Moonstone Lake	Southern Kahurangi N.P.		Widening of the Karamea River	41°22′45″S 172°25′50″E
Paratitahi Tarns	Nelson Lakes N.P.		Southeast of Lake Rotoiti, north of Paraumu Tarn	41°53′50″S 172°50′50″E
Paraumu Tarn	Nelson Lakes N.P.		Southeast of Lake Rotoiti	41°54′05″S 172°50′50″E
Round Lake	Central Kahurangi N.P.			41°03′10″S 172°29′45″E
Ruby Lake	Eastern Kahurangi N.P.			41°04′35″S 172°35′05″E
Saddle Lakes	Western Kahurangi N.P.			41°23′30″S 172°17′30″E
Shag Tarn	Western Kahurangi N.P.			41°20′12″S 172°10′35″E
Swampy Tarn	Western Kahurangi N.P.			41°19′30″S 172°08′55″E

=== Nelson ===
The following lakes are located in the Nelson Region.

Lake	Location	Area	Notes	Coordinates
Dew Lakes	Nelson			41°19′31″S 173°24′38″E
Maitai Dam	Nelson		Reservoir	41°17′40″S 173°22′30″E
Rush Pool	Nelson			41°18′42″S 173°23′12″E

=== Marlborough ===
The following lakes are located in the Marlborough Region.

Lake	Location	Area	Notes	Coordinates
Argyle Pond	Marlborough District		In Wairau Valley to south of Wairau River	41°40′30″S 173°12′00″E
Big Lagoon	Marlborough District		East of Blenheim, close to the mouth of the Wairau River	41°33′00″S 174°06′00″E
Bowscale Tarn	Marlborough District		One of a cluster of lakes in the upper Wairau Valley	42°07′40″S 172°57′15″E
Chandlers Lagoon	Marlborough District		Arm of Big Lagoon	41°33′10″S 174°04′00″E
Lake Elterwater	Marlborough District		Small lake north of Ward	41°48′00″S 174°09′20″E
Fish Lake	Marlborough District		One of a cluster of lakes in the upper Wairau Valley	42°07′15″S 172°56′00″E
Island Lake	Marlborough District		One of a cluster of lakes in the upper Wairau Valley	42°09′15″S 172°56′15″E
Lake Alexander	Marlborough District			41°44′50″S 173°39′45″E
Lake Chalice	Marlborough District		In Mount Richmond F.P. north of Wairau River	41°34′10″S 173°18′30″E
Lake Grassmere/Kapara Te Hau	Marlborough District		Shallow lagoon, used for salt production	41°44′00″S 174°10′00″E
Lake Jasper	Marlborough District		On the floodplain of the Awatere River west of Seddon	41°39′45″S 173°58′30″E
Lake McRae	Marlborough District		In the Inland Kaikōura Range. Feeds a tributary of the Waiau Toa / Clarence River	42°11′00″S 173°20′00″E
Lake Sedgemere	Marlborough District		One of a cluster of lakes in the upper Wairau Valley	42°08′08″S 172°55′00″E
Lake Timara	Marlborough District		On the floodplain of the Wairau River just south of Renwick	41°31′45″S 173°48′40″E
Upper Lagoon	Marlborough District		Arm of Big Lagoon	41°32′30″S 174°04′00″E
Waikarapi Lagoon	Marlborough District		Arm of Big Lagoon	41°32′30″S 174°05′00″E

=== West Coast ===
The following lakes are located in the West Coast region.

Lake	Location	Area	Notes	Coordinates
Abel Lake	Northern Westland District			43°20′20″S 170°38′20″E
Alpine Lake / Ata Puai	Westland N.P.			43°17′10″S 170°08′20″E
Ariels Tarns	Northern Westland District			42°56′27″S 171°25′06″E
Argyle Dam	Buller District	0.42 km	Was a large man made Dam made by gold miners slightly south of Charleston and was used to feed water races.	41°56′40″S 171°26′20″E
Bell Dam	Northern Westland District			42°42′10″S 171°13′35″E
Bessons Dam	Buller District			42°03′30″S 171°23′10″E
Boil Hole	Southern Westland District		Widening on the Okuru River	43°57′30″S 168°59′20″E
Charlies Ponds	Southern Westland District			44°07′42″S 168°49′00″E
Cloudmaker Lake	Southern Westland District			44°18′20″S 168°43′20″E
Delta Tarn	Southern Westland District			44°08′15″S 168°28′10″E
Disappearing Lake	Southern Westland District		Small lake that Laschelles Creek flows out of underground, towards Martyr River	44°04′47″S 168°34′35″E
Douglas Lake	Central Westland District		At the terminal face of Douglas Glacier. Not to be confused with Lake Douglas	43°41′45″S 169°57′00″E
Five Mile Lagoon	Westland N.P.			43°16′30″S 170°05′30″E
Gaylor Dam	Northern Westland District			42°47′00″S 170°59′18″E
Gillows Dam	Westport			41°46′30″S 171°34′40″E
Hikimutu Lagoon	Northern Westland District		North of Saltwater Lagoon	43°04′19″S 170°29′00″E
Ice Lake	Northern Westland District			43°24′15″S 171°07′45″E
Ivory Lake	Northern Westland District			43°07′50″S 170°54′50″E
Kangaroo Lake	Grey District			42°36′30″S 171°33′00″E
Kapitea Reservoir	Northern Westland District			42°40′15″S 171°11′50″E
Kumara Reservoir	Northern Westland District			42°42′00″S 171°11′20″E
Lady Lake	Grey District			42°36′00″S 171°34′30″E
Lake Ahaura	Grey District			42°32′30″S 171°44′00″E
Lake Anna	Arthur's Pass N.P.			42°52′33″S 171°39′05″E
Lake Arthur	Northern Westland District			42°54′15″S 171°05′50″E
Lake Avernus	Grey District			42°35′22″S 172°04′25″E
Lake Barra	Mount Aspiring N.P.			43°59′05″S 169°16′00″E
Lake Barrowman	Central Westland District			43°28′00″S 170°24′05″E
Lake Browning/Whakarewa	Northern Westland District			42°56′50″S 171°20′40″E
Lake Brunner (Moana)	Grey District			42°37′00″S 171°27′00″E
Lake Bux	Southern Westland District		Parallel with and to the east of Lake Porm	44°09′45″S 168°39′45″E
Lake Christabel	Buller District		West of the Lewis Pass	42°24′30″S 172°14′30″E
Lake Clarke	Southern Westland District			44°07′30″S 168°40′20″E
Lake Dan	Southern Westland District			44°08′37″S 168°40′00″E
Lake Daniell	Buller District			42°18′00″S 172°17′20″E
Lake Darby	Northern Westland District		One of a pair of lakes with Lake Joan	43°09′45″S 170°24′05″E
Lake Dime	Central Westland District			43°49′35″S 169°16′42″E
Lake Douglas	Mount Aspiring N.P.		Not to be confused with Douglas Lake	43°58′00″S 169°05′30″E
Lake Eggeling	Mount Aspiring N.P.			43°59′10″S 169°08′45″E
Lake Ellery	Southern Westland District			44°03′00″S 168°39′20″E
Lake Florence	Arthur's Pass N.P.			42°52′53″S 171°29′55″E
Lake Gault	Westland N.P.			43°25′50″S 169°59′15″E
Lake Gibb	Westland N.P.			43°24′47″S 170°00′55″E
Lake Greaney	Mount Aspiring N.P.			44°05′35″S 168°47′05″E
Lake Hamer	Southern Westland District		Above Cascade River, close to Smiths Ponds	44°08′25″S 168°31′10″E
Lake Haupiri	Grey District			42°34′00″S 171°41′30″E
Lake Hochstetter	Grey District	5 km^{2} (1.9 sq mi)	Named in 1861	42°27′00″S 171°40′00″E
Lake Ianthe/Matahi	Northern Westland District			43°03′30″S 170°37′30″E
Lake Ida	Grey District			42°42′46″S 171°22′57″E
Lake Joan	Northern Westland District		One of a pair of lakes with Lake Darby	43°09′35″S 170°23′50″E
Lake Julia	Grey District			42°43′10″S 171°22′10″E
Lake Jumbuck	Southern Westland District			44°01′45″S 168°23′45″E
Lake Kaniere	Northern Westland District			42°50′00″S 171°09′00″E
Lake Kaurapataka	Arthur's Pass N.P.			42°47′10″S 171°42′00″E
Lake Kini	Central Westland District			43°36′15″S 169°37′20″E
Lake Law	Central Westland District			43°48′35″S 169°16′15″E
Lake Leeb	Southern Westland District			44°08′15″S 168°40′05″E
Lake Lyes	Northern Westland District			43°04′12″S 171°02′35″E
Lake Lyttle	Westland N.P.			43°25′15″S 169°57′30″E
Lake Mahinapua	Northern Westland District			42°47′30″S 170°55′00″E
Lake Mapourika	Westland N.P.			43°19′00″S 170°12′00″E
Lake Margaret	Grey District			42°17′17″S 171°24′10″E
Lake Mary	Southern Westland District			44°02′30″S 168°42′42″E
Lake Matheson	Westland N.P.			43°26′25″S 169°58′00″E
Lake Miro	Westland N.P.			43°15′20″S 170°08′15″E
Lake Misery	Arthur's Pass N.P.		Beside SH 73	42°54′00″S 171°33′33″E
Lake Moeraki	Central Westland District			43°45′50″S 169°17′00″E
Lake Morgan	Grey District			42°40′20″S 171°42′25″E
Lake Mudgie	Northern Westland District			42°43′15″S 171°10′40″E
Lake Mueller	Westland N.P.			43°25′20″S 170°02′00″E
Lake Nisson	Southern Westland District			44°01′20″S 168°47′45″E
Lake Nivalus	Grey District			42°21′25″S 171°57′01″E
Lake Paringa	Central Westland District			43°43′00″S 169°24′30″E
Lake Poerua	Grey District			42°42′30″S 171°29′30″E
Lake Porm	Southern Westland District		Parallel with and to the west of Lake Bux	44°09′45″S 168°39′38″E
Lake Pratt	Northern Westland District			43°21′05″S 170°10′15″E
Lake Rahui	Buller District		In 1917 Lake Rahui was described as no more than a few feet deep, with portions free of flax and raupo. It is probably the remnant of a larger ox-bow lake in a former channel of the Buller. It has been part of the Orikaka Ecological Area since 2001, as lowland swamp forests are rare in the area and it has roroa.	41°49′10″S 171°52′05″E
Lake Rasselas	Central Westland District		Northeast of Lake Paringa, into which it flows	43°41′50″S 169°21′00″E
Lake Rochfort	Buller District		East of Westport	41°45′50″S 171°43′30″E
Lake Roto Te Koeti	Central Westland District			43°38′25″S 169°46′00″E
Lake Rotokino	Northern Westland District			43°09′30″S 170°25′50″E
Lake Ruby	Grey District			42°42′15″S 171°21′45″E
Lake Ryan	Grey District			42°25′33″S 171°12′27″E
Lake Sally	Arthur's Pass N.P.			42°52′30″S 171°39′50″E
Lake Swan	Grey District			42°39′15″S 171°31′50″E
Lake Sweeney	Central Westland District			43°47′10″S 169°25′00″E
Lake Tarleton	Northern Westland District			42°45′47″S 170°55′45″E
Lake Topsy	Central Westland District			43°45′30″S 169°18′00″E
Lake Wahapo	Central Westland District		Southeast of Ōkārito Lagoon	43°15′00″S 170°16′00″E
Lake Whitestone	Grey District			42°38′09″S 171°31′52″E
Lake Windermere	Central Westland District		North of Ōkārito Lagoon, into which it flows	43°09′15″S 170°14′00″E
Lake Wombat	Westland N.P.		Close to Franz Josef village	43°24′12″S 170°10′04″E
Macs Lagoon	Southern Westland District		Oxbow lake close to the mouth of the Turnbull River	43°55′30″S 168°55′15″E
Manks Tarn	Northern Westland District		South of Lake Kaniere	42°52′15″S 171°07′45″E
Minim Mere	Mount Aspiring N.P.			44°05′00″S 168°47′25″E
Morgan Tarn	Buller District			41°57′25″S 171°35′45″E
Mueller Tarn	Grey District			42°21′57″S 172°19′46″E
Ogilvie Lagoon	Northern Westland District			42°50′45″S 170°54′25″E
Okari Lagoon	Buller District			41°49′15″S 171°27′45″E
Ōkārito Lagoon	Central Westland District			43°12′00″S 170°12′00″E
Okuku Reservoir	Northern Westland District			42°43′55″S 171°13′45″E
Orowaiti Lagoon	Westport			41°44′45″S 171°38′00″E
Otoko Lake	Central Westland District			43°48′55″S 169°42′36″E
Ounatai Lagoon	Northern Westland District			42°58′30″S 170°38′00″E
Peters Pool	Westland N.P.		Close to Franz Josef village	43°25′11″S 170°10′20″E
Pororari Lagoon	Buller District		Near Punakaiki, at the mouth of the Pororari River	42°06′05″S 171°20′20″E
Pukaki Lagoon	Northern Westland District		In area of wetland between Lake Mahinapua and the Hokitika River	42°49′35″S 170°56′00″E
Reid Lake	Northern Westland District			43°09′08″S 170°54′02″E
Saddle Lake	Westland N.P.			43°32′46″S 170°01′05″E
Saltwater Lagoon	Northern Westland District			43°06′00″S 170°21′00″E
Smiths Ponds	Southern Westland District			44°07′50″S 168°30′50″E
Surprise Ponds	Northern Westland District			42°56′05″S 170°57′40″E
Swans Retreat Lagoon	Grey District		Close to the shore of Lake Brunner	42°35′35″S 171°28′55″E
Tawharekiri Lakes	Central Westland District		North of the mouth of the Haast River	43°50′00″S 169°05′10″E
Teal Tarn	Northern Westland District		Immediately to the southeast of Zalas Pond	42°54′21″S 170°55′30″E
Theta Tarn	Southern Westland District			44°12′15″S 168°26′45″E
Three Mile Lagoon	Westland N.P.			43°14′45″S 170°08′00″E
Totara Lagoon (West Coast)	Northern Westland District			42°48′40″S 170°52′45″E
Townson Tarn	Buller District			41°53′03″S 171°38′36″E
Tukes Lagoons	Northern Westland District		In area of wetland between Lake Mahinapua and the Hokitika River	42°49′55″S 170°55′50″E
Waiatoto Lagoon	Southern Westland District			43°58′20″S 168°48′20″E
White Heron Lagoon	Northern Westland District		South of Lake Rotokino, into which it flows	43°10′30″S 170°26′20″E
Woodhen Pond	Southern Westland District			44°10′40″S 168°29′00″E
Zalas Pond	Northern Westland District		Immediately to the northwest of Teal Tarn	42°54′13″S 170°55′12″E

=== Canterbury ===
The following lakes are located in the Canterbury region.

Lake	Location	Area	Notes	Coordinates
Acland Lagoon	Mackenzie District		North of Lake Pukaki	43°50′07″S 170°06′40″E
Albert Lake	Christchurch City		Immediately east of Victoria Lake in Hagley Park	43°31′39″S 172°37′27″E
Amberley Beach Lagoon	Hurunui District		North of Amberley Beach	43°10′08″S 172°46′58″E
Ashworths Ponds	Ashburton District		Coastal lakes south of Leithfield	43°13′55″S 172°44′30″E
Blackwater Lake	Selwyn District			43°07′00″S 171°55′30″E
Blue Lagoon	Hurunui District			42°43′21″S 172°32′43″E
Blue Lakes	Aoraki/Mount Cook N.P.		Southeast of Tasman Lake	43°41′40″S 170°09′55″E
Boltons Gully Lagoon	Mackenzie District		East of Lake Pukaki	43°58′27″S 170°15′00″E
Boundary Tarns	Mackenzie District		Northwest of Lake Alexandrina	43°54′45″S 170°24′35″E
Bowscale Tarn	Hurunui District			42°07′40″S 172°57′15″E
Braemar Kettleholes	Mackenzie District		East of Lake Pukaki	43°59′15″S 170°12′55″E
Brooklands Lagoon	Christchurch City		South of the mouth of the Waimakariri River	43°25′00″S 172°42′20″E
Casey Tarn	Selwyn District			43°07′00″S 171°26′30″E
Cluster Tarns	Mackenzie District		Northwest of Lake Alexandrina	43°54′00″S 170°24′35″E
Coopers Lagoon / Muriwai	Selwyn District			43°51′50″S 172°18′25″E
Fish Lake	Hurunui District			42°07′15″S 172°55′50″E
Forks Lagoon	Mackenzie District		West of Lake Alexandrina	43°56′40″S 170°22′55″E
Fred's Tarn	Mackenzie District		Northwest of Lake Alexandrina	43°54′55″S 170°21′25″E
Gabriel Tarn	Hurunui District		Northeast of Lake Sumner	42°41′11″S 172°18′26″E
Glenmore Tarns	Mackenzie District		Northwest of Lake Alexandrina	43°53′30″S 170°25′15″E
Grebe Tarn	Mackenzie District		Northwest of Lake Alexandrina	43°53′55″S 170°25′48″E
Hartley Tarn	Mackenzie District		North of Lake Alexandrina	43°52′55″S 170°26′25″E
Hooker Lake	Aoraki/Mount Cook N.P.		Proglacial lake at the terminal face of the Hooker Glacier	43°40′45″S 170°06′30″E
Horseshoe Lake	Christchurch City		Oxbow lake to the north of the Avon River	43°29′48″S 172°40′43″E
Horseshoe Lake	Hurunui District			42°35′52″S 172°31′20″E
Island Lake	Hurunui District			42°09′15″S 172°56′15″E
Jimmeys Lagoon	Mackenzie District		South of Lake Alexandrina	43°58′43″S 170°27′43″E
Kaituna Lagoon	Christchurch City and Selwyn District		Arm of Lake Ellesmere / Te Waihora	43°47′30″S 172°39′00″E
Kellands Pond	Mackenzie District		Arm of Lake Ruataniwha	44°17′50″S 170°04′00″E
Lake Alexandrina	Mackenzie District		West of Lake Tekapo	43°56′00″S 170°27′30″E
Lake Aviemore	Northern Waitaki District		Hydroelectric lake, on border with Otago	44°37′00″S 170°18′00″E
Lake Camp	Ashburton District		Part of the Ashburton Lakes group	43°37′00″S 171°03′30″E
Lake Catherine	Selwyn District			43°13′20″S 171°33′35″E
Lake Clearwater	Ashburton District		Part of the Ashburton Lakes group	43°36′20″S 171°03′00″E
Lake Coleridge	Selwyn District			43°18′00″S 171°30′00″E
Lake Crichton	Selwyn District		Artificial water-skiing course near Dunsandel	43°41′35″S 172°10′00″E
Lake Denny	Ashburton District		Part of the Ashburton Lakes group	43°40′15″S 171°07′20″E
Lake Donne	Ashburton District		South of the Spider Lakes, part of the Ashburton Lakes group	43°36′30″S 171°06′55″E
Lake Ellesmere / Te Waihora	Christchurch City and Selwyn District		Large shallow lagoon, separated from the sea by Kaitorete Spit	43°48′00″S 172°28′00″E
Lake Emily	Ashburton District		Part of the Ashburton Lakes group	43°33′05″S 171°14′40″E
Lake Emma	Ashburton District		Part of the Ashburton Lakes group	43°38′10″S 171°06′30″E
Lake Evelyn	Selwyn District		East of Lake Coleridge	43°15′10″S 171°32′15″E
Lake Forsyth (Wairewa)	Banks Peninsula		Former inlet in the southwest coast of Banks Peninsula, now separated from the sea by a shingle bank	43°48′00″S 172°45′00″E
Lake George Scott (Scott Pond)	Mackenzie District		Artificial lake below Lake Tekapo on Tekapo River	44°00′55″S 170°27′50″E
Lake Georgina	Selwyn District		East of Lake Coleridge	43°19′00″S 171°34′00″E
Lake Grace	Arthur's Pass N.P.			42°55′28″S 171°58′35″E
Lake Grasmere	Selwyn District			43°03′45″S 171°46′30″E
Lake Guyon	Hurunui District			42°17′30″S 172°39′00″E
Lake Hawdon	Selwyn District		Named after Joseph Hawdon	43°06′15″S 171°51′00″E
Lake Henrietta	Selwyn District		Northeast of Lake Coleridge	43°13′45″S 171°30′00″E
Lake Heron	Ashburton District		Part of the Ashburton Lakes group	43°28′00″S 171°11′00″E
Lake Ida	Selwyn District		East of Lake Coleridge	43°14′05″S 171°32′15″E
Lake Janet	Hurunui District			43°08′10″S 172°33′15″E
Lake Letitia	Selwyn District			43°03′15″S 171°57′00″E
Lake Lilian	Selwyn District			43°10′30″S 171°31′15″E
Lake Lyndon	Selwyn District			43°18′15″S 171°41′50″E
Lake Man	Hurunui District		Within Lake Sumner Forest Park	42°32′40″S 172°18′26″E
Lake Marion	Hurunui District		Within Lake Sumner Forest Park	42°40′40″S 172°13′55″E
Lake Mary	Hurunui District		South of Lake Sumner	42°45′10″S 172°14′50″E
Lake Marymere	Selwyn District			43°07′00″S 171°51′15″E
Lake Mason	Hurunui District		South of Lake Sumner. Actually two lakes connected by a 50-metre stream	42°44′00″S 172°10′10″E
Lake Mavis	Selwyn District			42°54′10″S 171°38′40″E
Lake McGregor	Mackenzie District		Between Lake Alexandrina and Lake Tekapo	43°56′10″S 170°28′0″E
Lake Merino	Mackenzie District		Between Lake Pukaki and Lake Ruataniwha, beside the Pukaki Canal	44°12′55″S 170°03′17″E
Lake Minchin	Arthur's Pass N.P.			42°49′40″S 171°48′55″E
Lake Murray	Mackenzie District		West of Lake Tekapo	43°54′15″S 170°28′08″E
Lake Ōhau	Mackenzie District and northern Waitaki District			44°15′00″S 169°51′00″E
Lake Opuha	Mackenzie District		Artificial lake formed by Opuha Dam	44°00′00″S 170°52′00″E
Lake Paget	Hurunui District			42°16′20″S 172°32′42″E
Lake Pearson	Selwyn District			43°06′00″S 171°47′00″E
Lake Pegasus	Waimakariri District			43°18′45″S 172°42′05″E
Lake Poaka	Mackenzie District	0,32 km^{2}	Southwest of Lake Pukaki, beside the Pukaki Canal	44°12′20″S 170°06′00″E
Lake Pukaki	Mackenzie District			44°07′00″S 170°10′00″E
Lake Roto Kohatu	Christchurch City		Artificial lake formed for recreation purposes from former gravel pit	43°27′50″S 172°34′25″E
Lake Rotoiti	Kaikōura District		East of Kaikōura, close to the larger Lake Rotorua	42°23′50″S 173°35′35″E
Lake Rotorua	Kaikōura District		East of Kaikōura, close to the smaller Lake Rotoiti	42°24′20″S 173°34′50″E
Lake Roundabout	Ashburton District		Part of the Ashburton Lakes group	43°37′25″S 171°05′40″E
Lake Ruataniwha	Mackenzie District			44°16′45″S 170°04′00″E
Lake Rubicon	Selwyn District			43°17′50″S 171°49′55″E
Lake Sarah	Selwyn District			43°03′00″S 171°46′35″E
Lake Sedgemere	Hurunui District			42°08′08″S 172°55′00″E
Lake Selfe	Selwyn District	33ha or 0.65 km^{2}	Oligotrophic lake east of Lake Coleridge	43°14′30″S 171°31′15″E
Lake Sheppard	Hurunui District		South of Lake Sumner	42°45′40″S 172°15′00″E
Lake Stella	Hurunui District			42°27′56″S 173°08′20″E
Lake Sumner	Hurunui District		Partially within Lake Sumner Forest Park	42°42′00″S 172°13′00″E
Lake Taylor	Hurunui District		South of Lake Sumner	42°46′00″S 172°14′00″E
Lake Tekapo	Mackenzie District			43°55′00″S 170°32′00″E
Lake Tennyson	Hurunui District			42°12′00″S 172°43′40″E
Lake Thompson	Hurunui District		A source of the Waiau Uwha River	42°07′30″S 172°38′25″E
Lake Trinity	Ashburton District			43°38′00″S 171°09′20″E
Lake Wardell	Mackenzie District		South of Lake Pukaki, beside the Pukaki Canal	44°11′48″S 170°07′22″E
Lambies Lagoon	Ashburton District			43°36′45″S 171°04′55″E
Leithfield Beach Lagoon	Hurunui District			43°12′25″S 172°45′22″E
Little Lake	Hurunui District			42°20′05″S 172°36′40″E
Loch Cameron	Mackenzie District		Between Lake Pukaki and Lake Ruataniwha, beside the Pukaki Canal	44°13′12″S 170°03′17″E
Loch Katrine	Hurunui District		South of Lake Sumner	42°43′00″S 172°12′00″E
Manuka Lake	Ashburton District			43°31′55″S 171°14′45″E
Maori Lakes	Ashburton District		Part of the Ashburton Lakes group	43°34′20″S 171°10′30″E
Margarets Tarn	Arthur's Pass N.P.			42°54′56″S 171°33′09″E
Mata Kopae Lagoon	Hurunui District			42°46′50″S 173°16′00″E
Mimimoto Lagoon	Hurunui District		South of Amberley Beach	43°10′49″S 172°46′28″E
Morris Tarn	Hurunui District		Within Lake Sumner Forest Park	42°37′15″S 172°14′55″E
Muddy Lakes	Hurunui District			42°21′10″S 172°36′30″E
Mueller Lake	Aoraki/Mount Cook N.P.		Proglacial lake at the terminal face of the Mueller Glacier	43°42′30″S 170°05′30″E
Murchison Lake	Aoraki/Mount Cook N.P.		Proglacial lake at the terminal face of the Murchison Glacier	43°36′00″S 170°19′50″E
Mystery Lake	Ashburton District		Not to be confused with Mystery Tarn	43°32′30″S 171°01′35″E
Mystery Tarn	Selwyn District		Not to be confused with Mystery Lake	43°12′22″S 171°4′18″E
Paradise Lake	Hurunui District			42°23′00″S 172°36′40″E
Patersons Ponds	Mackenzie District		Series of small ponds beside Tekapo River	44°03′30″S 170°25′50″E
Phantom Lagoon	Mackenzie District		East of Lake Tekapo	43°56′05″S 170°35′44″E
Pierce Pond	Mackenzie District		West of Lake Tekapo	43°54′10″S 170°29′20″E
Princess Bath	Hurunui District			42°11′05″S 172°41′30″E
Quagmire Tarn	Ashburton District			43°19′20″S 171°07′17″E
Rakaia Lagoon	Selwyn District		At the mouth of the Rakaia River	43°53′20″S 172°14′30″E
Rapuwai Lagoon	Mackenzie District		West of Lake Tekapo	43°51′10″S 170°30′22″E
Raupo Pond	Hurunui District		South of Lake Sumner	42°46′25″S 172°15′37″E
Red Lakes	Selwyn District		Southeast of Lake Coleridge	43°19′45″S 171°36′55″E
Red Tarns	Aoraki/Mount Cook N.P.		South of Mount Cook Village	43°45′00″S 170°06′10″E
Roys Lagoon	Mackenzie District		East of Lake Tekapo	43°59′00″S 170°32′40″E
Saint Anne's Lagoon	Hurunui District		Part of the Mata Kopae Lagoon system	43°08′10″S 172°33′15″E
Seagull Lake	Ashburton District			43°30′40″S 171°14′45″E
Spider Lagoon	Timaru District			44°15′00″S 171°23′33″E
Spider Lakes	Ashburton District		Part of the Ashburton Lakes group	42°46′40″S 173°16′15″E
Stony Tarn	Mackenzie District		North of Lake Alexandrina	43°52′28″S 170°26′45″E
Sunday Tarn	Mackenzie District		Northwest of Lake Alexandrina	43°54′15″S 170°25′15″E
Swan Lagoon	Mackenzie District		East of Lake Pukaki	43°58′25″S 170°18′10″E
Tasman Lake	Aoraki/Mount Cook N.P.		Proglacial lake at the terminal face of the Tasman Glacier	43°41′00″S 170°11′00″E
The Black Hole	Mackenzie District		East of Lake Pukaki	44°00′10″S 170°15′00″E
Trig 'N' Tarn	Mackenzie District		West of Lake Tekapo	43°57′18″S 170°28′19″E`
Tui Tarn	Mackenzie District		North of Lake Alexandrina	43°52′10″S 170°27′00″E
Tutaepatu Lagoon	Waimakariri District			43°19′35″S 172°42′15″E
Twin Lakes	Mackenzie District		Between Lake Pukaki and Lake Ruataniwha	44°13′40″S 170°03′55″E
Vagabonds Inn	Selwyn District			43°08′20″S 171°51′25″E
Victoria Lake	Christchurch City		Immediately west of Albert Lake in Hagley Park	43°31′40″S 172°37′20″E
Wainono Lagoon	Waimate District			44°42′00″S 171°09′30″E
Wairepo Arm	Mackenzie District		Arm of Lake Ruataniwha	44°17′50″S 170°05′00″E
Washdyke Lagoon	Timaru District			44°21′45″S 171°15′10″E
Windy Tarn	Ashburton District			43°18′23″S 171°06′38″E

=== Otago ===
The following lakes are located in the Otago region.

Lake	Location	Area	Notes	Coordinates
Arethusa Pool	Queenstown-Lakes District		Lake on an island (Mou Waho) on a lake (Wānaka) on an island (the South Island)	44°33′15″S 169°05′02″E
Blue Lake	Central Otago District		At Saint Bathans. Created by gold mining operations	44°52′05″S 169°48′40″E
Butchers Dam	Central Otago District		Near Alexandra	45°17′40″S 169°20′20″E
Catlins Lake	The Catlins		Estuarial lake at the mouth of the Catlins River	46°29′00″S 169°38′00″E
Cloudmaker Lake	Mount Aspiring N.P.			44°18′20″S 168°43′20″E
Coalpit Dam	Central Otago District		Near Naseby	45°01′15″S 170°07′10″E
Conroys Dam	Central Otago District		Near Alexandra	45°16′55″S 169°19′10″E
Crucible Lake	Mount Aspiring N.P.			44°10′25″S 169°00′20″E
Diamond Lake	Queenstown-Lakes District		Near Glenorchy–Paradise Road	44°44′20″S 168°22′30″E
Diamond Lake	Queenstown-Lakes District		Near Lake Wānaka	44°38′50″S 168°57′50″E
Downeys Dam	Queenstown-Lakes District			44°57′42″S 168°42′28″E
Dukes Tarn	Queenstown-Lakes District		South of Lake Luna	44°57′50″S 168°29′35″E
Dumb-bell Lake	Southern Waitaki District			44°14′40″S 169°45′30″E
Falls Dam	Central Otago District		On the upper Manuherikia River	44°52′00″S 169°54′30″E
Fohn Lakes	Mount Aspiring N.P.			44°31′00″S 168°15′50″E
Fraser Dam	Central Otago District		Near Alexandra	45°12′40″S 169°12′40″E
Gem Lake	Central Otago District			45°34′15″S 169°06′25″E
Greenland Reservoir	Central Otago District		South of Manorburn Reservoir	45°26′00″S 169°37′30″E
Hawkers Dam	Clutha District			45°55′55″S 169°47′07″E
Hawksbury Lagoon	Dunedin City		In Waikouaiti	45°36′20″S 170°40′30″E
Hoffmans Dam	Central Otago District		Near Naseby	45°01′25″S 170°07′38″E
Idaburn Dam	Central Otago District		Neat Oturehua	45°01′40″S 169°53′22″E
Kaikorai Lagoon	Dunedin City		Near Waldronville	45°55′00″S 170°23′50″E
Kellands Pond	Southern Waitaki District		South of Lake Ruataniwha	44°18′00″S 170°04′00″E
Knights Dam	Clutha District		North of Lake Mahinerangi	45°47′45″S 169°53′40″E
Lake Alta	Queenstown-Lakes District		At the Remarkables Skifield	45°03′50″S 168°48′40″E
Lake Benmore	Southern Waitaki District	74 km^{2}	Hydroelectric lake formed behind the Benmore Dam, on the boundary with Canterbury	44°25′00″S 170°13′00″E
Lake Castalia	Mount Aspiring N.P.			44°13′20″S 168°55′10″E
Lake Diana	Mount Aspiring N.P.			44°15′22″S 168°53′33″E
Lake Dispute	Queenstown-Lakes District		North of Lake Wakatipu	45°02′30″S 168°33′00″E
Lake Dunstan	Central Otago District		Hydroelectric lake formed on the Clutha River behind the Clyde Dam	45°01′00″S 169°13′00″E
Lake Harris	Mount Aspiring N.P.		Along the Routeburn Track, south of Lake Wilson	44°43′30″S 168°10′30″E
Lake Hāwea	Queenstown-Lakes District	141 km^{2}		44°30′00″S 168°17′00″E
Lake Hayes	Queenstown-Lakes District	2.0 km^{2}	Near Arrowtown	44°59′00″S 168°48′30″E
Lake Hope	Queenstown-Lakes District			45°08′10″S 168°49′45″E
Lake Isobel	Queenstown-Lakes District		North of Lake Wakatipu	45°01′20″S 168°29′30″E
Lake Johnson	Queenstown-Lakes District		Near Frankton	45°00′20″S 168°44′00″E
Lake Kirkpatrick	Queenstown-Lakes District		North of Lake Wakatipu	45°01′40″S 168°34′25″E
Lake Luna	Queenstown-Lakes District			44°57′00″S 168°29′30″E
Lake Mahinerangi	Clutha District	18.6 km^{2}		45°50′00″S 169°55′00″E
Lake McKay	Central Otago District		In the Pisa Range above Lake Dunstan	44°51′00″S 169°12′45″E
Lake McKellar	Queenstown-Lakes District	1.0 km^{2}		44°51′00″S 168°08′30″E
Lake Middleton	Southern Waitaki District		Near Lake Ohau Alpine Village	44°16′40″S 169°51′00″E
Lake Mystery	Mount Aspiring N.P.			44°34′05″S 168°18′30″E
Lake Ned	Southern Queenstown-Lakes District			45°17′15″S 168°26′00″E
Lake Nerine	Mount Aspiring N.P.			44°38′10″S 168°12′20″E
Lake Nigel	Southern Queenstown-Lakes District			45°17′45″S 168°25′40″E
Lake Onslow	Central Otago District	3.5 km^{2}	East of Roxburgh	45°33′00″S 169°37′00″E
Lake Reid	Queenstown-Lakes District			44°45′45″S 168°23′25″E
Lake Rere	Queenstown-Lakes District		Along the Greenstone Track	44°57′05″S 168°19′25″E
Lake Roxburgh	Central Otago District	6 km^{2}	Hydroelectric lake formed on the Clutha River behind the Roxburgh Dam	45°28′00″S 170°19′50″E
Lake Sylvan	Mount Aspiring N.P.			44°42′20″S 168°19′10″E
Lake Te Kohua	Queenstown-Lakes District			45°08′35″S 168°51′30″E
Lake Tuakitoto	Clutha District	3.4 km^{2}	Near Balclutha	46°13′30″S 169°49′30″E
Lake Unknown/Lake Dave	Mount Aspiring N.P.			44°37′50″S 168°16′30″E
Lake Waihola	Clutha District	6.1 km^{2}	Separated from Lake Waipori by wetlands	46°01′30″S 170°04′00″E
Lake Waipori	Clutha District	2.3 km^{2}	Separated from Lake Waihola by wetlands	45°58′00″S 170°06′45″E
Lake Waitaki	Southern Waitaki District	5.6 km^{2}	Lake formed as part of the Waitaki hydroelectric scheme, on the boundary with Canterbury	44°40′30″S 170°24′00″E
Lake Wakatipu	Queenstown-Lakes District	293 km^{2}		45°05′00″S 168°30′00″E
Lake Wānaka	Queenstown-Lakes District	193 km^{2}		44°30′00″S 168°08′00″E
Lake Wilkie	The Catlins	0.017 km^{2}	Inland from Tautuku Beach	46°34′50″S 169°26′20″E
Lake Williamson	Mount Aspiring N.P.		Source of the Williamson River	44°24′30″S 168°24′00″E
Lake Wilmot	Mount Aspiring N.P.	1.7 km^{2}		44°23′00″S 168°13′00″E
Lake Wilson	Queenstown-Lakes District		North of Lake Harris	44°42′20″S 168°10′40″E
Lindsays Tarn	Queenstown-Lakes District			44°42′20″S 168°43′35″E
Loch Loudon	Clutha District		Arm of Lake Mahinerangi	45°52′40″S 169°58′45″E
Loch Luella	Clutha District		Arm of Lake Mahinerangi	45°52′15″S 169°56′45″E
Lochnagar	Queenstown-Lakes District			44°35′30″S 168°36′00″E
Loganburn Reservoir	Central Otago District		In upper catchment of Taieri River	45°33′00″S 169°55′00″E
Lower Manorburn Dam	Central Otago District		Near Alexandra	45°14′30″S 169°26′50″E
Lucidus Lake	Mount Aspiring N.P.			44°14′30″S 168°54′00″E
Malones Dam	Clutha District		Near Lawrence	45°53′35″S 169°43′20″E
Manorburn Reservoir	Central Otago District	1.6 km^{2}	North of Greenland Reservoir	45°23′00″S 169°37′00″E
Milburns Pond (Victoria Dam)	Clutha District		Close to Gabriel's Gully	45°52′30″S 169°40′25″E
Moa Creek Reservoir	Central Otago District		East of Alexandra	45°14′35″S 169°38′25″E
Moke Lake	Queenstown-Lakes District		North of Lake Wakatipu	45°00′00″S 168°34′00″E
Phoenix Dam	Clutha District		Near Lawrence	45°53′00″S 169°42′40″E
Pinders Pond	Central Otago District		Close to the banks of the Clutha River south of Roxburgh	45°34′40″S 169°19′12″E
Poolburn Reservoir	Central Otago District	4.0 km^{2}		45°18′45″S 169°44′30″E
Raupo Lagoon	Southern Waitaki District		South of Lake Ōhau	44°19′10″S 169°54′10″E
Red Lagoon	Southern Waitaki District		South of Lake Ōhau	44°18′40″S 169°52′35″E
Ross Creek Reservoir	Dunedin City			45°50′50″S 170°29′55″E
Sheehey Lake	Central Otago District			45°09′25″S 169°16′50″E
Southern Reservoir	Dunedin City			45°53′20″S 170°26′55″E
Sullivans Dam	Dunedin City			45°48′25″S 170°31′25″E
Sutton Salt Lake	Central Otago District		New Zealand's only inland salt lake. Located south of Middlemarch.	45°34′35″S 170°05′12″E
Swan Lagoon	Southern Waitaki District		South of Lake Ōhau	44°18′40″S 169°55′30″E
Three Lagoons	Queenstown-Lakes District		On the slopes of Cecil Peak	45°07′30″S 168°37′20″E
Tomahawk Lagoon	Dunedin City	0.30 km^{2}	Twin-lobed lagoon close to the isthmus of Otago Peninsula. Watershed: 4.66 km^{2}	45°54′00″S 170°32′40″E
West Eweburn Dam	Central Otago District			45°00′00″S 170°04′40″E

=== Southland ===
The following lakes are located in the Southland region.

Lake	Location	Area	Notes	Coordinates
Acheron Lakes	Northwestern Southland District			45°10′00″S 168°05′45″E
Big Lagoon	Southern Southland District			46°21′10″S 168°10′30″E
Black Lake	Northern Fiordland N.P.			44°44′43″S 168°00′54″E
Blue Lake	Northern Southland District			45°28′30″S 168°55′40″E
Bog Lake	Central Fiordland N.P.		Close to eastern shore of Lake Te Anau	45°10′30″S 167°49′40″E
Buttercup Lake	Northern Fiordland N.P.			44°46′55″S 167°56′05″E
Crescent Lake	Northwestern Southland District			44°22′50″S 168°20′18″E
Deadwood Lagoon	Central Fiordland N.P.			45°00′40″S 167°30′23″E
Double Lakes	Northern Stewart Island			46°49′25″S 167°49′10″E
False Lake	Southern Fiordland N.P.			45°49′15″S 166°54′20″E
Gair Loch	Southern Fiordland N.P.		On the Seaforth River	45°37′25″S 167°06′30″E
Green Lake	Southern Fiordland N.P.			45°47′45″S 167°23′45″E
Hidden Lake	Central Fiordland N.P.			45°14′45″S 167°18′20″E
Island Lake	Southern Fiordland N.P.			45°46′45″S 167°22′00″E
Jane Lake	Southern Fiordland N.P.			45°42′45″S 167°06′40″E
Lake Ada	Northern Fiordland N.P.	2.5 km^{2}	Along the Milford Track	44°42′40″S 167°51′30″E
Lake Adelaide	Northern Fiordland N.P.	1.7 km^{2}		44°43′20″S 168°02′30″E
Lake Agnes	Northwestern Southland District			44°34′30″S 168°03′40″E
Lake Alabaster/Wāwāhi Waka	Northwestern Southland District	4.2 km^{2}		44°31′00″S 168°09′30″E
Lake Alexander	Northern Stewart Island			46°49′42″S 167°51′30″E
Lake Alice	Central Fiordland N.P.	1.7 km^{2}		44°58′20″S 167°27′40″E
Lake Annie	Central Fiordland N.P.			45°23′00″S 167°16′45″E
Lake Astelia	Secretary Island, Fiordland N.P.			45°13′00″S 166°58′10″E
Lake Beattie	Central Fiordland N.P.			45°30′15″S 166°47′00″E
Lake Beddoes	Northern Fiordland N.P.			44°54′30″S 167°33′00″E
Lake Bennett	Southern Southland District			46°19′45″S 168°25′40″E
Lake Bernard	Northern Fiordland N.P.			44°53′00″S 167°38′15″E
Lake Bloxham	Central Fiordland N.P.			45°08′30″S 167°25′30″E
Lake Boomerang	Central Fiordland N.P.			45°18′10″S 167°21′45″E
Lake Bright	Southern Fiordland N.P.			45°41′30″S 167°08′30″E
Lake Brown	Northern Fiordland N.P.		Above Milford Sound	44°44′00″S 167°49′40″E
Lake Browne	Central Fiordland N.P.		Above Doubtful Sound	45°24′00″S 167°04′20″E
Lake Brownlee	Northern Fiordland N.P.			44°53′30″S 167°43′30″E
Lake Brunton	The Catlins			46°39′10″S 168°53′10″E
Lake Cadman	Southern Fiordland N.P.	1.7 km^{2}		45°52′10″S 166°43′30″E
Lake Calder	Northern Stewart Island			46°49′35″S 167°51′22″E
Lake Carina	Central Fiordland N.P.			45°30′20″S 167°15′30″E
Lake Carrick	Southern Fiordland N.P.			45°50′30″S 166°46′00″E
Lake Cecil	Central Fiordland N.P.			45°18′15″S 167°23′00″E
Lake Chamberlain	Central Fiordland N.P.			45°22′50″S 167°03′20″E
Lake Charles	The Catlins			46°37′53″S 168°51′42″E
Lake Clark	Central Fiordland N.P.		West of Lake Hankinson	45°03′50″S 167°31′50″E
Lake Colwell	Central Fiordland N.P.			45°31′50″S 167°09′40″E
Lake Cook	The Catlins			46°39′05″S 168°55′10″E
Lake Dale	Northern Fiordland N.P.			44°46′35″S 167°39′55″E
Lake Dobson	Great Island, Fiordland N.P.			45°59′55″S 166°33′50″E
Lake Dora	Central Fiordland N.P.		Immediately south of Lake Pan, between Te Awa-o-Tū / Thompson Sound and Hinenui / Nancy Sound	45°12′30″S 167°03′15″E
Lake Duncan	Central Fiordland N.P.			45°13′40″S 167°23′10″E
Lake Earnshaw	Southern Fiordland N.P.			45°35′50″S 167°11′20″E
Lake Echo	Western Southland District			45°24′05″S 167°58′15″E
Lake Erskine	Northern Fiordland N.P.		Above Lake Te Anau	44°50′15″S 167°59′45″E
Lake Esau	Great Island, Fiordland N.P.			45°59′25″S 166°33′40″E
Lake Eva	Central Fiordland N.P.			45°17′10″S 167°20′10″E
Lake Eyles	Central Fiordland N.P.			45°15′00″S 167°28′10″E
Lake Fergus	Northern Fiordland N.P.			44°50′40″S 168°06′40″E
Lake Forest	The Catlins			46°37′50″S 168°52′55″E
Lake Forster	Southern Fiordland N.P.			45°48′00″S 166°33′50″E
Lake Fraser	Southern Fiordland N.P.			45°53′20″S 166°30′50″E
Lake Freeman	Central Fiordland N.P.			45°20′40″S 167°20′15″E
Lake George	Southern Southland District	1.5 km^{2}		46°21′30″S 167°51′30″E
Lake Gow	Northern Southland District			45°28′30″S 168°53′45″E
Lake Grave	Northern Fiordland N.P.	1.7 km^{2}	Flows into Sutherland Sound	44°49′00″S 167°37′00″E
Lake Gunn	Northern Fiordland N.P.	1.7 km^{2}		44°52′30″S 168°05′30″E
Lake Hakapoua	Southern Fiordland N.P.	5.0 km^{2}	Big River runs through it	46°11′00″S 166°56′00″E
Lake Hall	Central Fiordland N.P.			45°17′45″S 167°22′45″E
Lake Hankinson	Central Fiordland N.P.	2.5 km^{2}		45°04′00″S 167°34′30″E
Lake Hauroko	Southern Fiordland N.P.	68.3 km^{2}	New Zealand's deepest lake (462 metres (1,516 ft))	46°00′00″S 167°20′00″E
Lake Hay	Southern Fiordland N.P.			45°48′20″S 167°03′00″E
Lake Hector	Southern Fiordland N.P.			45°59′00″S 166°30′50″E
Lake Henry	Western Southland District		Spring-fed lake close to Te Anau	45°25′50″S 167°43′00″E
Lake Herries	Central Fiordland N.P.			45°22′00″S 167°23′00″E
Lake Hilda	Central Fiordland N.P.	1.7 km^{2}		45°16′30″S 167°23′30″E
Lake Horizon	Southern Fiordland N.P.			45°41′50″S 167°07′35″E
Lake Howden	Northern Fiordland N.P.			44°49′10″S 168°08′10″E
Lake Hyslop	Northern Fiordland N.P.			44°39′00″S 168°09′40″E
Lake Iceberg	Northern Fiordland N.P.			44°34′40″S 168°02′05″E
Lake Innes	Southern Fiordland N.P.			46°10′30″S 166°57′30″E
Lake Ione	Central Fiordland N.P.			45°16′50″S 167°20′15″E
Lake Jaquiery	Southern Fiordland N.P.			45°50′05″S 167°14′30″E
Lake Kakapo	Southern Fiordland N.P.			45°55′15″S 167°03′00″E
Lake Katherine	Central Fiordland N.P.			45°00′00″S 167°27′10″E
Lake Kirirua	Anchor Island, Fiordland N.P.			45°45′20″S 166°32′00″E
Lake Kiwi	Southern Fiordland N.P.			46°09′40″S 166°48′20″E
Lake Laffy	Southern Fiordland N.P.			45°42′15″S 167°08′30″E
Lake Laura	Northern Southland District			45°27′45″S 168°54′05″E
Lake Lochie	Northern Fiordland N.P.			44°49′50″S 168°06′55″E
Lake Lois	Central Fiordland N.P.			45°30′45″S 167°21′00″E
Lake Louise	Central Fiordland N.P.			45°32′15″S 167°07′50″E
Lake Lucille	Central Fiordland N.P.			45°29′45″S 167°15′45″E
Lake Lucy	Central Fiordland N.P.			45°27′35″S 167°11′50″E
Lake Luxmore	Western Southland District			45°28′00″S 167°50′45″E
Lake Macarthur	Southern Fiordland N.P.	1.0 km^{2}		45°54′40″S 166°35′50″E
Lake Mainwaring	Central Fiordland N.P.			45°29′40″S 167°12′05″E
Lake Manapouri	Central Fiordland N.P.	153 km^{2}		45°30′00″S 167°30′00″E
Lake Mantle	Northwestern Southland District			44°31′20″S 168°07′00″E
Lake Marchant	Central Fiordland N.P.	2.5 km^{2}		45°04′00″S 167°20′00″E
Lake Marian	Northern Fiordland N.P.			44°47′10″S 168°04′40″E
Lake Mariana	Northern Fiordland N.P.			44°45′15″S 168°03′05″E
Lake Marianette	Northern Fiordland N.P.			44°45′25″S 168°03′20″E
Lake Marshall	Southern Fiordland N.P.			46°10′00″S 166°57′35″E
Lake Matilda	Central Fiordland N.P.			45°27′40″S 167°12′20″E
Lake McIvor	Central Fiordland N.P.			45°06′00″S 167°31′00″E
Lake Mackenzie	Northern Fiordland N.P.		Along the Routeburn Track	44°45′45″S 167°46′55″E
Lake McKerrow/Whakatipu Waitai	Northwestern Southland District	18.3 km^{2}		44°28′00″S 168°03′30″E
Lake McKinnon	Central Fiordland N.P.			45°07′00″S 167°23′10″E
Lake Mike	Southern Fiordland N.P.			45°49′35″S 166°53′40″E
Lake Minerva	Central Fiordland N.P.			45°19′30″S 167°20′40″E
Lake Mintaro	Northern Fiordland N.P.		Along the Milford Track	44°48′31″S 167°56′45″E
Lake Monk	Southern Fiordland N.P.	1.7 km^{2}		46°01′00″S 166°57′40″E
Lake Monowai	Southern Fiordland N.P.	32.5 km^{2}		45°53′00″S 167°26′00″E
Lake Moreton	Northern Fiordland N.P.			44°41′20″S 167°44′10″E
Lake Mouat	Southern Fiordland N.P.	1.5 km^{2}		46°02′00″S 167°01′20″E
Lake Murihiku	Invercargill			46°24′20″S 168°15′50″E
Lake Never	Northwestern Southland District			44°29′10″S 168°14′20″E
Lake Never-never	Northern Fiordland N.P.			44°33′25″S 167°57′10″E
Lake Norma	Central Fiordland N.P.			45°20′15″S 167°16′25″E
Lake Norwest	Central Fiordland N.P.	1.0 km^{2}		45°27′50″S 167°19′45″E
Lake Ogle	Central Fiordland N.P.			45°05′00″S 167°32′35″E
Lake Orbell	Central Fiordland N.P.		Outflow (Tunnel Burn) flows through Te Ana-au Caves	45°17′40″S 167°40′30″E
Lake Pan	Central Fiordland N.P.		Immediately north of Lake Dora, between Te Awa-o-Tū / Thompson Sound and Hinenui / Nancy Sound	45°12′10″S 167°03′00″E
Lake Paradise	Central Fiordland N.P.			45°27′00″S 166°50′00″E
Lake Percy	Central Fiordland N.P.		West of Lake Manapouri	45°32′42″S 167°15′50″E
Lake Poteriteri	Southern Fiordland N.P.	42.5 km^{2}		45°06′00″S 167°08′00″E
Lake Pukutahi	Northern Fiordland N.P.			44°33′15″S 167°56′20″E
Lake Purser	Southern Fiordland N.P.			45°49′20″S 166°47′30″E
Lake Quill	Northern Fiordland N.P.	0.53 km^{2}	Source of the Sutherland Falls	44°48′30″S 167°43′30″E
Lake Rakatu	Southern Fiordland N.P.	1.0 km^{2}		45°37′30″S 167°35′30″E
Lake Richter	Central Fiordland N.P.			45°29′10″S 167°30′20″E
Lake Rimmer	Southern Fiordland N.P.			45°55′40″S 166°34′50″E
Lake Roberts	Northwestern Southland District			44°48′15″S 168°10′00″E
Lake Roe	Southern Fiordland N.P.			45°42′25″S 167°09′10″E
Lake Ronald	Northern Fiordland N.P.			44°38′10″S 167°42′50″E
Lake Ross	Northern Fiordland N.P.		Above Lake Te Anau	44°53′45″S 167°56′45″E
Lake Roxburgh	Central Fiordland N.P.			45°00′30″S 167°40′30″E
Lake Saint Patrick	Southern Fiordland N.P.			45°37′15″S 167°13′00″E
Lake Scott	Northern Southland District			45°27′35″S 168°54′40″E
Lake Sheila	Northern Stewart Island			46°49′40″S 167°50′25″E
Lake Shirley	Central Fiordland N.P.			45°04′00″S 167°15′00″E
Lake Speden	Northwestern Southland District			44°30′00″S 168°08′10″E
Lake Story	Southern Fiordland N.P.			45°44′30″S 167°10′20″E
Lake Sumor	Northern Fiordland N.P.		North of Lake Brownlee	44°52′25″S 167°43′15″E
Lake Sutherland	Central Fiordland N.P.			45°00′00″S 167°33′45″E
Lake Swan	Central Fiordland N.P.			45°28′40″S 166°48′30″E
Lake Te Anau	Central Fiordland N.P.	352 km^{2}	Largest lake in the South Island	45°12′00″S 167°48′00″E
Lake Te Aroha	Western Southland District			45°19′30″S 167°48′10″E
Lake Te Au	Central Fiordland N.P.	2.5 km^{2}		45°15′20″S 167°22′50″E
Lake Thomas	Southern Fiordland N.P.		Near the mouth of Taiari / Chalky Inlet	45°59′15″S 166°30′10″E
Lake Thomas	Western Southland District		East of Te Anau	45°28′15″S 167°56′45″E
Lake Thompson	Northern Fiordland N.P.		Near the Homer Saddle	44°47′45″S 167°58′45″E
Lake Thomson	Central Fiordland N.P.		Above Lake Te Anau	45°02′20″S 167°32′20″E
Lake Troup	Central Fiordland N.P.			45°28′45″S 167°07′50″E
Lake Truth	Northwestern Southland District			44°32′25″S 168°01′20″E
Lake Tuaraki	Central Fiordland N.P.			45°18′30″S 167°20′20″E
Lake Turner	Northern Fiordland N.P.			44°39′20″S 168°02′00″E
Lake Ursula	Southern Fiordland N.P.			45°42′00″S 167°07′40″E
Lake Victor	Southern Fiordland N.P.			45°54′45″S 166°48′00″E
Lake Victoria	Central Fiordland N.P.			45°25′10″S 167°27′10″E
Lake Vincent	The Catlins			46°35′40″S 168°49′40″E
Lake Virginia	Central Fiordland N.P.			45°31′20″S 167°18′30″E
Lake Wade	Central Fiordland N.P.			45°02′30″S 167°31′10″E
Lake Wapiti	Central Fiordland N.P.			45°04′00″S 167°27′00″E
Lake Welcome	Central Fiordland N.P.		Between George and Caswell Sounds	45°00′45″S 167°22′58″E
Lake Widgeon	Southern Fiordland N.P.			45°54′30″S 166°55′00″E
Lake Wisely	Central Fiordland N.P.			45°12′30″S 167°25′20″E
Loch Maree	Southern Fiordland N.P.		On the Seaforth River	45°41′10″S 167°03′30″E
Long White Lagoon	Southern Southland District			46°21′15″S 168°09′35″E
McKenzie Lagoon	Northwestern Southland District		Inland from Martins Bay, close to the mouth of the Hollyford River	44°19′45″S 168°05′40″E
Mirror Lakes	Central Fiordland N.P.			45°01′40″S 168°00′40″E
Misty Tarn	Northern Southland District			45°26′50″S 168°54′50″E
Moana Putakitaki Lagoon	Ruapuke Island			46°46′20″S 168°32′00″E
Moose Lake	Southern Fiordland N.P.			45°38′35″S 166°55′35″E
Myth Tarn	Central Fiordland N.P.			45°07′45″S 167°21′45″E
North Mavora Lake	Northwestern Southland District	10.8 km^{2}		45°13′00″S 168°10′00″E
Prong Lake	Southern Fiordland N.P.			45°50′25″S 166°54′00″E
Rainbow Lake	Northern Fiordland N.P.			44°53′45″S 167°56′45″E
Secretary Lake	Secretary Island, Fiordland N.P.			45°16′10″S 166°58′00″E
Shallow Lake	Southern Fiordland N.P.			44°41′25″S 168°05′35″E
Shy Lake	Southern Fiordland N.P.			45°36′10″S 166°53′15″E
Skeleton Lakes	Northern Southland District			45°27′10″S 168°55′20″E
South Mavora Lake	Northwestern Southland District	1.2 km^{2}		45°18′00″S 168°10′30″E
Sphinx Lake	Southern Fiordland N.P.			45°50′20″S 167°05′40″E
Stump Lake	Central Fiordland N.P.		Above the Hall Arm of Doubtful Sound	45°31′25″S 167°02′55″E
Swan Mere	Northern Fiordland N.P.		Flows into Lake Grave	44°50′35″S 167°38′00″E
Tauatemaku Lagoon	Ruapuke Island			46°47′05″S 168°30′55″E
Tawera Tarn	Central Fiordland N.P.			45°09′50″S 167°21′35″E
Te Awatuiau Lagoon	Ruapuke Island			46°46′20″S 168°29′30″E
Teardrop Lake	Central Fiordland N.P.		Above Bradshaw Sound	45°05′00″S 167°32′35″E
The Reservoir	The Catlins			46°39′20″S 169°03′30″E
Three Duck Lake	Central Fiordland N.P.			44°59′55″S 167°17′20″E
Trinity Lakes	Central Fiordland N.P.			45°13′45″S 167°11′30″E
Waitokariro Lagoon	Ruapuke Island			46°46′30″S 168°30′20″E
Waituna Lagoon	Southern Southland District		East of Bluff	46°34′00″S 168°35′00″E
Waiuna Lagoon	Northwestern Southland District		North of Lake Alabaster	44°18′20″S 168°08′20″E
West Mere	Central Fiordland N.P.		Above Lake Manapouri	45°28′20″S 167°30′10″E

== Other islands ==
=== Auckland Islands ===
Lake	Location	Area	Notes	Coordinates
Lake Hinemoa	Northern Auckland Island	0.17 km^{2}	Upper reaches of a moraine-dammed fiord. Lower reaches form Musgrave Inlet.	50°38′55″S 166°08′20″E
Lake Speight	Southwestern Auckland Island	0.04 km^{2}	Stream flows from lake to Coleridge Bay, Carnley Harbour.	50°49′15″S 165°58′50″E
Lake Turbott	Southern Adams Island	0.20 km^{2}	Moraine dammed fiord.	50°54′30″S 166°02′50″E
Lake Tutanekai	Northern Auckland Island	0.08 km^{2}	Upper reaches of a moraine-dammed fiord. Lower reaches form Granger Inlet.	50°37′40″S 166°09′20″E
Teal Lake	Enderby Island	0.003 km^{2}	Small pool close to south shore of the island.	50°30′21″S 166°18′31″E

=== Campbell Island ===
Lake	Location	Area	Notes	Coordinates
Six Foot Lake	Southern Campbell Island	0.08 km^{2}	Separated from Monument Harbour on the south coast by a narrow channel.	52°35′20″S 169°08′50″E

=== Chatham Islands ===
Many of the lakes in the Chatham Islands are either lagoons filling sinkholes in the island's limestone structure, or low-lying peat lakes. The island chain is dominated by Te Whanga Lagoon, which occupies the centre of the main island and accounts for one sixth of the surface area of the archipelago.

Lake	Location	Area	Notes	Coordinates
Lake Huro	Central Chatham Island, near Waitangi	7.8 km^{2}		43°56′00″S 176°31′00″W
Lake Kaimoumi	Northeastern Chatham Island			43°45′20″S 176°24′05″W
Lake Kaingarahu	Northeastern Chatham Island			43°49′30″S 176°22′40″W
Lake Kairae	Northeastern Chatham Island			43°51′20″S 176°24′10″W
Lake Koomutu	Northern Chatham Island			43°45′00″S 176°25′25″W
Lake Makuku	Northeastern Chatham Island			43°50′30″S 176°23′30″W
Lake Marakapia	Northern Chatham Island			43°50′30″S 176°33′20″W
Lake Matangirau	Southwestern Chatham Island			44°04′45″S 176°34′40″W
Lake Omatu	Northeastern Chatham Island			43°44′35″S 176°14′55″W
Lake Pateriki	Northeastern Chatham Island		Lagoon	43°45′10″S 176°18′30″W
Lake Pukawa	Southwestern Chatham Island			44°04′05″S 176°33′40″W
Lake Rakeinui	Southwestern Chatham Island			44°05′30″S 176°35′00″W
Lake Rangitai	Northeastern Chatham Island			43°46′00″S 176°21′00″W
Lake Rotoeka	Northern Chatham Island			43°46′30″S 176°35′40″W
Lake Rotokawau	Northern Chatham Island			43°45′00″S 176°35′15″W
Lake Rotoparaoe	Northern Chatham Island			43°48′50″S 176°35′30″W
Lake Rotorua	Northeastern Chatham Island			43°45′40″S 176°17′30″W
Lake Taia	Northeastern Chatham Island			43°52′00″S 176°24′15″W
Lake Te Rangatapu	Southwestern Chatham Island			44°06′20″S 176°35′20″W
Lake Te Wapu	Northeastern Chatham Island			43°44′30″S 176°15′45″W
Lake Tuka a Taupo	Southern Chatham Island			44°04′05″S 176°31′30″W
Lake Waikauia	Northern Chatham Island			43°43′05″S 176°37′25″W
Lake Wharemanu	Northeastern Chatham Island			43°45′15″S 176°24′55″W
Lake Wharo	Northern Chatham Island			43°44′35″S 176°30′15″W
Long Pond	Eastern Chatham Island			43°52′50″S 176°24′50″W
Morgans Hollow	Western Pitt Island			44°16′35″S 176°14′40″W
Pakauwera Pond	Northern Chatham Island			43°44′50″S 176°29′15″W
Rangitahi Lake	Northwestern Chatham Island			43°46′00″S 176°21′00″W
Te Roto	Northern Chatham Island			43°49′15″S 176°35′00″W
Te Whanga Lagoon	Central Chatham Island	150 km^{2}	Lagoon	43°52′00″S 176°28′00″W
Tennant's Lake	Northern Chatham Island			43°49′45″S 176°34′10″W

=== Cook Islands ===
Lake	Location	Area	Notes	Coordinates
Lake Tiriara	Mangaia			21°57′03″S 157°55′45″W
Lake Tiroto	Aitu Island			20°00′35″S 158°07′25″W
Te Rotonui	Mitiaro			19°52′02″S 157°41′34″W

=== Kermadec Islands ===
Lake	Location	Area	Notes	Coordinates
Blue Lake	Raoul Island	0.80 km^{2}	Crater lake	29°15′20″S 177°54′50″W
Green Lake	Raoul Island	0.15 km^{2}	Crater lake	29°15′50″S 177°55′09″W

=== Ross Dependency ===
The following lakes are located in Ross Dependency, New Zealand's claim in Antarctica.

Lake	Location	Area	Notes	Coordinates
Alph Lake	Scott Coast		Part of Alph River system	78°11′50″S 163°42′30″E
Don Juan Pond	McMurdo Dry Valleys	0.03 km^{2}	Hypersaline lake	77°33′52″S 161°10′30″E
Howchin Lake	Scott Coast		Part of Alph River system	78°13′10″S 163°31′00″E
Lake Bonney	McMurdo Dry Valleys	4.3 km^{2}	Endorheic lake	77°44′00″S 162°10′00″E
Lake Brownworth	McMurdo Dry Valleys		Glacial meltwater lake	77°26′10″S 162°46′00″E
Lake Chad	McMurdo Dry Valleys		Endorheic lake	77°38′35″S 162°45′30″E
Lake Chapman	Granite Harbour		Covered in ice	77°01′00″S 162°23′00″E
Lake Cole	Black Island		Covered in ice	78°09′00″S 166°13′00″E
Lake Fryxell	McMurdo Dry Valleys	7.8 km^{2}	Endorheic lake	77°36′40″S 163°10′20″E
Lake Hoare	McMurdo Dry Valleys	1.9 km^{2}	Endorheic lake	77°37′50″S 162°52′00″E
Lake Vanda	McMurdo Dry Valleys		Endorheic lake	77°31′50″S 161°34′30″E
Lake Vida	McMurdo Dry Valleys	6.8 km^{2}	Endorheic lake	77°23′20″S 161°55′40″E
Mount Erebus Lava Lake	Ross Island	0.01 km^{2}	Crater lake	77°31′37″S 167°09′55″E
Pyramid Ponds	Scott Coast		Part of Alph River system	78°17′00″S 163°27′10″E
Trough Lake	Scott Coast		Part of Alph River system	78°16′40″S 163°29′10″E
Walcott Lake	Scott Coast		Part of Alph River system	78°14′25″S 163°27′20″E

== See also ==
- List of lakes
- List of lagoons of New Zealand
- List of dams and reservoirs in New Zealand
- List of islands of New Zealand#In rivers and lakes
