= Lake Ora =

Lake in Northland New Zealand

- Location within Northland Region
- Location: Northland Region, North Island
- Coordinates: 35.6990°S 174.2851°E
- Basin countries: New Zealand

Lake Ora is a lake in the Northland Region of New Zealand.

== See also ==
- List of lakes in New Zealand
