= Lake Parawanui =

Lake in New Zealand

- Location within Northland Region
- Location: Northland Region, North Island
- Coordinates: 36.0643°S 173.8503°E
- Basin countries: New Zealand

Lake Parawanui is a lake in the Northland Region of New Zealand. The center of the lake lies at the latitude of -36.05819 and is known to be 46 meters above sea level.

== See also ==
- List of lakes in New Zealand
