= Lake Karaka =

Lake in Northland, New Zealand

- Location within Northland Region
- Location: Northland Region, North Island
- Coordinates: 36.3149°S 174.0395°E
- Basin countries: New Zealand

Lake Karaka is a lake in the Northland Region of New Zealand.

== See also ==
- List of lakes in New Zealand
