= Lake Roundabout =

Lake in the South Island of New Zealand

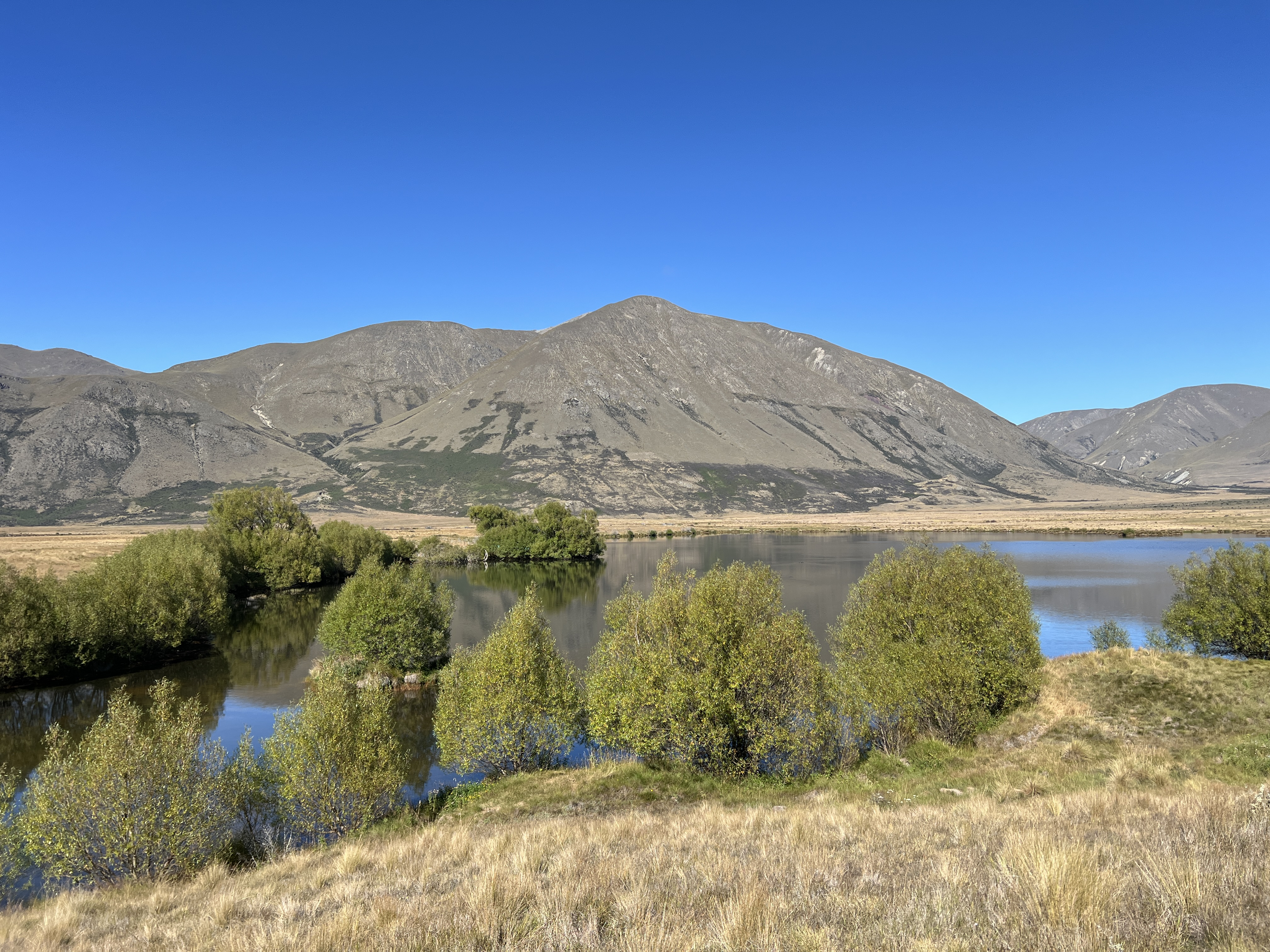
- Lake Roundabout
- Interactive map of Lake Roundabout
- Location: Ashburton District, Canterbury region, South Island
- Coordinates: 43°37′23″S 171°05′42″E
- Surface elevation: 660 m (2,170 ft)

Lake Roundabout is a small high-country lake located in inland Canterbury in the South Island of New Zealand. It is just to the north of Lake Emma, within the Hakatere Conservation Park. The lake has an unnamed tributary from Lake Camp, and it drains to Lake Emma. Lake Roundabout is part of the Ashburton Lakes (Ōtūwharekai), an area of cultural importance to the iwi Ngāi Tahu because the lakes were a significant food-gathering area and also on a main route for travel between the east and west coasts of the South Island (Te Waipounamu).

The lake is popular for fishing and hiking. It can be accessed via a track from the Hakatere Potts road, and is approximately 30 kilometres (19 mi) west of Mount Somers.

A case study report published by the Ministry for the Environment in 2023 reported that all the Ōtūwharekai / Ashburton Lakes were nutrient-enriched, with some at risk of deteriorating further into severe eutrophic states, changing from clear water with vegetation, to turbid algae-dominated water. The study reported that pastoral farming was the source for more than 90% of nutrients.
