= Lake Emily (New Zealand) =

Lake in the South Island of New Zealand

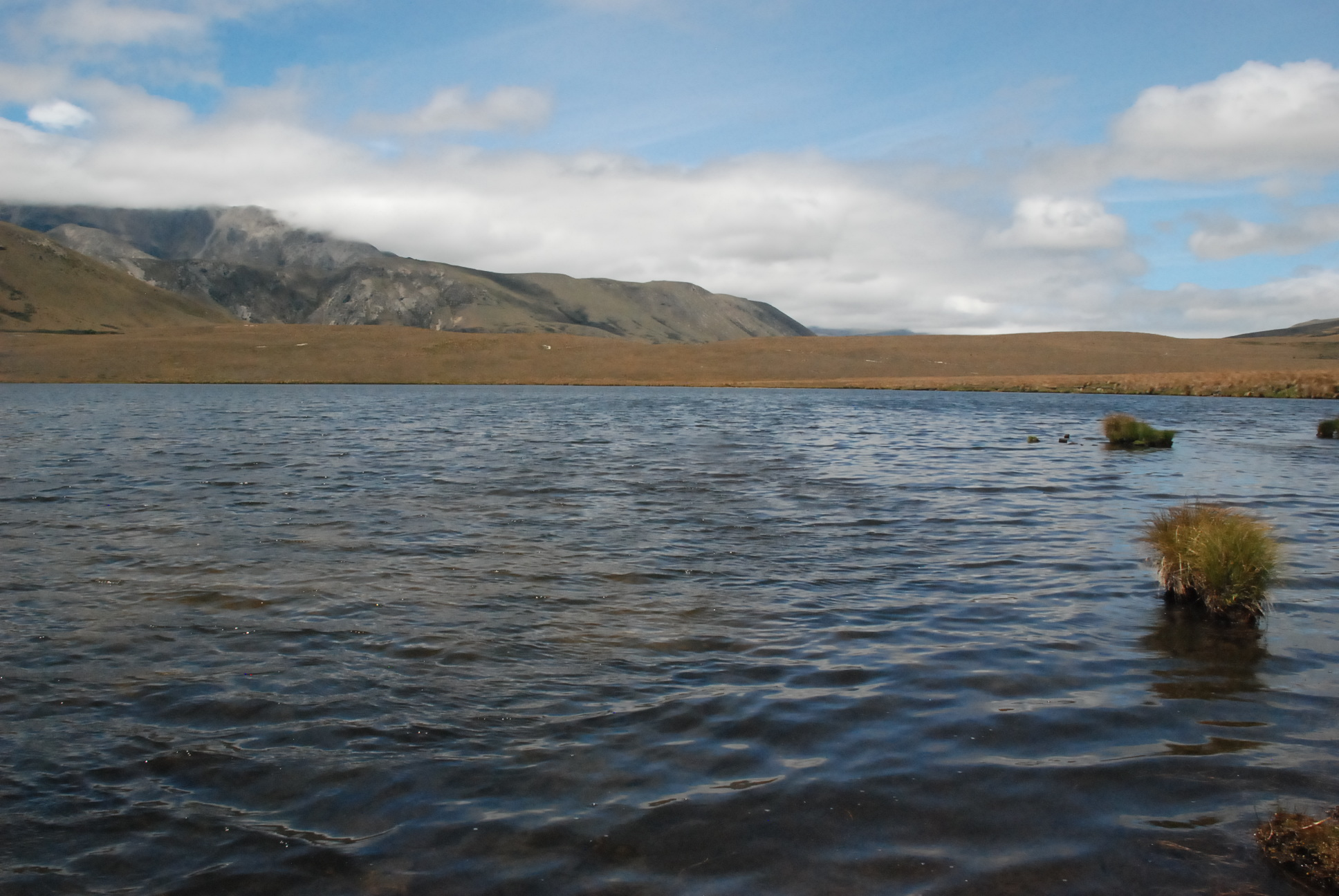
- Lake Emily
- Interactive map of Lake Emily
- Location: Ashburton District, Canterbury region, South Island
- Coordinates: 43°33′04″S 171°13′38″E
- Surface area: 19.3 ha (48 acres)
- Max. depth: 2.3 m (7.5 ft)
- Surface elevation: 672 m (2,205 ft)

Lake Emily is a small high country lake located in inland Canterbury in the South Island of New Zealand. The lake is shallow, with a maximum depth of 2.3 m (7 ft 7 in) and has a surface area of 19.3 ha (48 acres). Lake Emily is within the Hakatere Conservation Park, and is part of the Ashburton Lakes (Ōtūwharekai), an area of cultural importance to the iwi Ngāi Tahu because the lakes were a significant food–gathering area and also on a main route for travel between the east and west coasts of the South Island (Te Waipounamu).

The lake is popular for fishing and hiking. It can be accessed via a track from the Hakatere Heron road, and is approximately 31 km (19 mi) west of Mount Somers. The Te Araroa trail passes around the southern end of the lake.

The health of the lake is monitored using two parameters, the trophic level index and the Lake Submerged Plant Indicator. The trophic level index for the lake (a measure of nutrient status) has ranged between 3.8 and 5 over the period 2009 to 2023, ranking as "Fair".

A case study report published by the Ministry for the Environment in 2023 reported that all the Ōtūwharekai / Ashburton Lakes were nutrient-enriched, with some at risk of deteriorating further into severe eutrophic states, changing from clear water with vegetation, to turbid algae-dominated water. The study reported that pastoral farming was the source for more than 90% of nutrients.
