= Hakatere Conservation Park =

Conservation park in New Zealand

Coordinates: 43.5°S 171.2°E

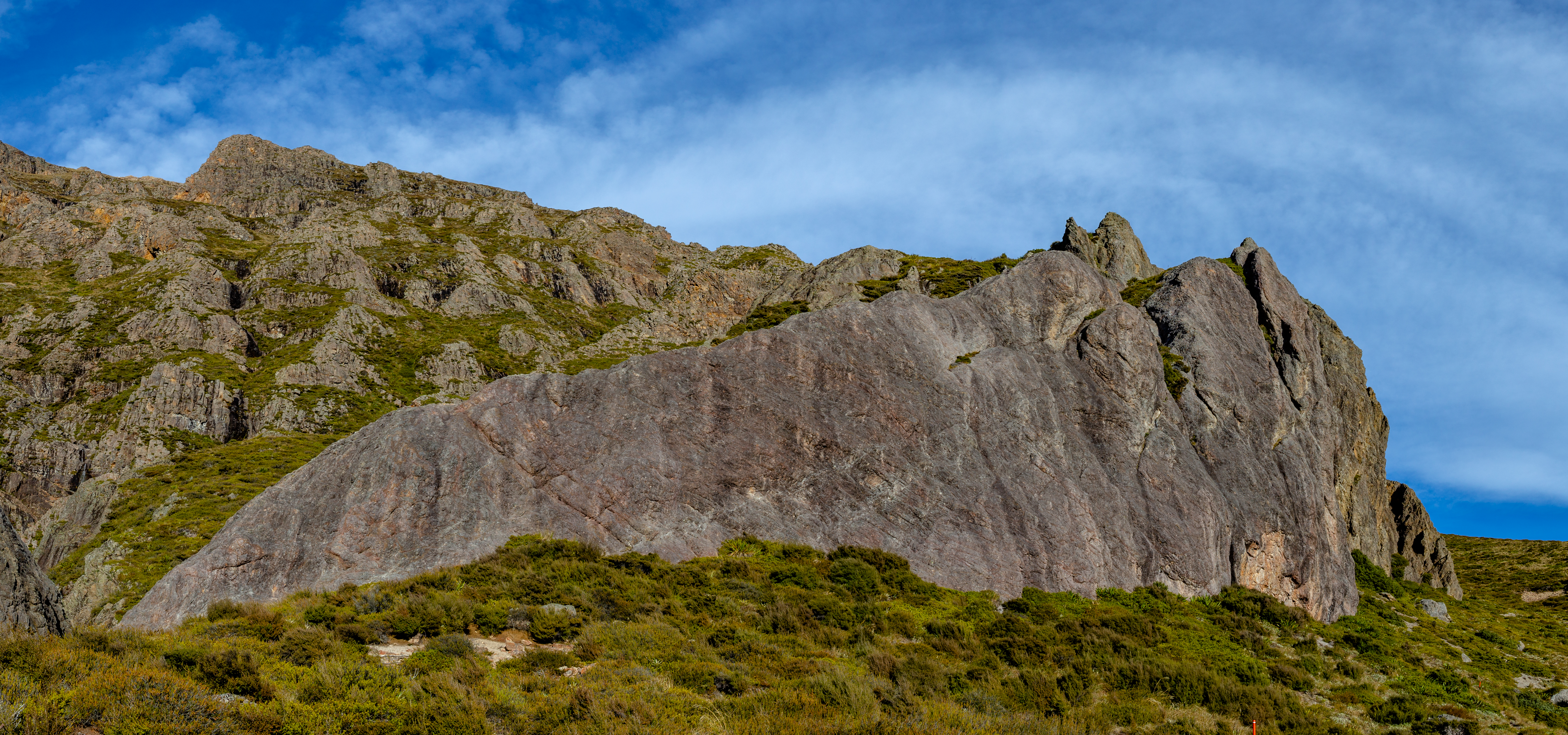
- A rock formation on the north-western side of Mount Somers
- Interactive map of Hakatere Conservation Park
- Area: 68,000 ha (260 sq mi)
- Established: 2007
- Governing body: Department of Conservation

Hakatere Conservation Park is a protected area of high country between the Rangitata and Rakaia River rivers in the Ashburton District of the South Island of New Zealand. The park was established in 2007 and covers 68,000 ha (170,000 acres) of rugged mountains and mountain basins, tussocklands and beech forest, and includes alpine and sub-alpine ecosystems, braided rivers, lakes and wetlands. These diverse environments provide significant wildlife habitat.

The Hakatere Conservation Park is a collection of discrete areas of protected conservation land, and lies within the wider Ashburton Lakes region that includes Lake Heron, Lake Emma, Lake Camp, Lake Clearwater, and the popular tramping area around Mount Somers / Te Kiekie, and the Mount Hutt skifield. The closest town is Mount Somers.

The Department of Conservation proposed the establishment of the park in 2006 and called for submissions. The park was established in 2007 by combining 19 separate areas of conservation land. Further areas of land for the park were obtained via the land tenure review process. The tenure review was "a voluntary process that gave lessees an opportunity to buy land best suited to economic use, while land with conservation values was protected and restored to full Crown ownership as conservation land". The historic Hakatere Station, including land around Lake Clearwater, was purchased by the Nature Heritage Fund. An additional 17,000 ha (42,000 acres) was added to the original area in 2008, including land from the Mt Potts and Redclliffe Stations.

Land purchased by the Crown as newly created public conservation land is initially classified as stewardship land, under section 25 of the Conservation Act 1987. As of 2025, the 9,100 ha (22,000 acres) of Hakatere Station land purchased for the park in 2007 is part of the Hakatere Conservation Area. It remains as stewardship land, and has not been reclassified to the protected status of "Park" under section 19 of the Act.

Recreational activities in the park include picnicking and camping, tramping, hunting, fishing, bird-watching, mountain biking, horseback riding and windsurfing. Recreational power boat use and water skiing is permitted on Lake Camp.

== See also ==
- Conservation parks of New Zealand
