= Mount Harper / Mahaanui =

Mountain in New Zealand

- Mahaanui
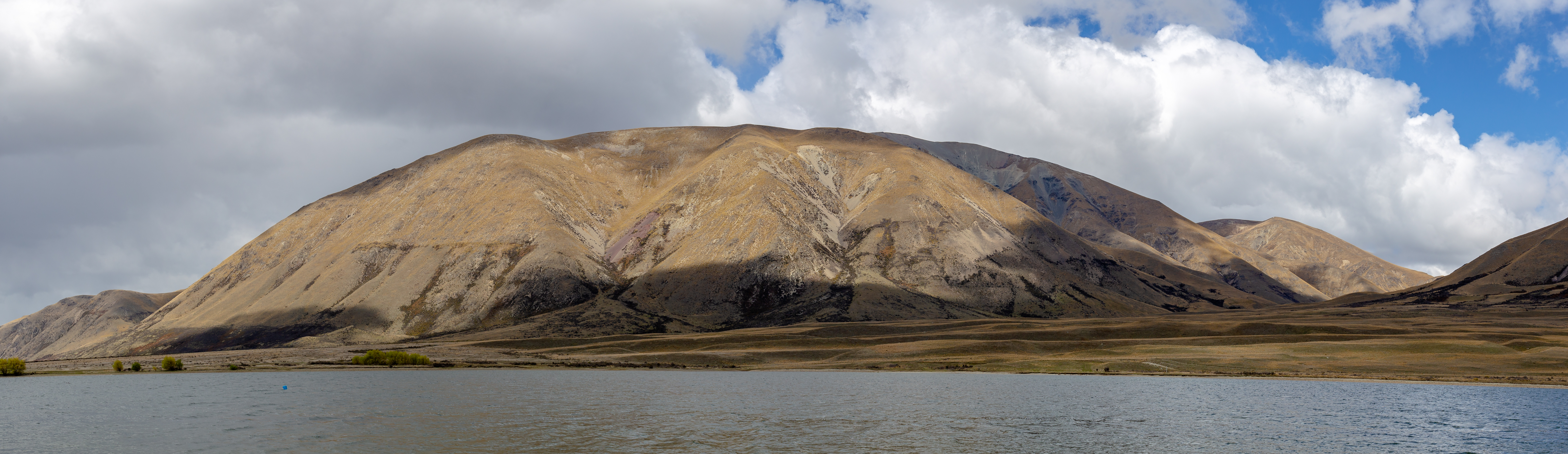
- Mount Harper / Mahaanui, as viewed from nearby Lake Camp

Highest point
- Elevation: 1,829 m (6,001 ft)
- Prominence: 1,129 m (3,704 ft)
- Coordinates: 43.6601°S 171.0624°E

Naming
- Etymology: Named for the waka of Māui, of which the mountain is said to be a representation.
- Native name: Te Nohoaka-o-Mahaanui (Māori)
- English translation: The resting place of Māui's Waka
- Defining authority: New Zealand Geographic Board

Geography
- Location within New Zealand
- Country: New Zealand
- Region: Canterbury
- Parent range: Harper Range

Mount Harper / Mahaanui (Māori: Mahaanui or Te Nohoaka-o-Mahaanui) is a mountain in Canterbury, New Zealand, within the foothills of the Southern Alps / Kā Tiritiri o te Moana. The mountain is the tallest point of the Harper Range, which is separated from the nearby Ben Macleod and Tara Haoa ranges to the south by the Rangitata River, and from the Moorhouse Range to the east by the Pudding valley. A number of small lakes (known collectively as the Ashburton Lakes) lie to the north of Mahaanui, most notably including Lake Clearwater.

As with much of the area, the majority of Mount Harper / Mahaanui consists of tussock grasslands, with some scree slopes on the northern and eastern faces. The mountain is popular year-round with hunters, with small numbers of introduced red deer, chamois, tahr and pigs present. Despite the lack of marked tracks and huts, the mountain is also a popular destination for trampers, along with the rest of Hakatere Conservation Park within which it sits.

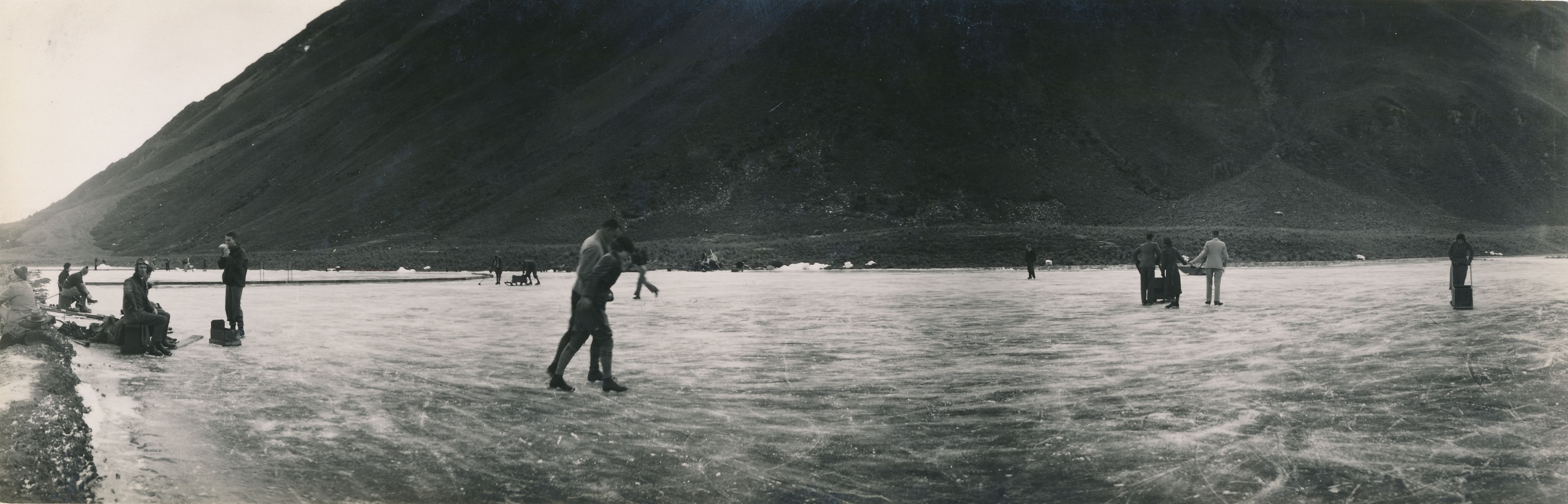
Mount Harper Ice Rink in the 1930s, photographed by Bobbie Barwell. The ice rink was established as a commercial venture by Wyndham Barker in 1933.

The mountain's Māori name, Mahaanui, is a shortened version of the name Te Nohoaka-o-Mahaanui, which translates as 'the resting place of Māui's waka'. This relates to a Māori legend in which the demigod Māui sent a rock representation of his waka to Aotearoa to prove that it was habitable. This representation was placed near Tarahaoa, and became Mahaanui. In 1998, the mountain was given the dual name of Mount Harper / Mahaanui by the passage of the Ngāi Tahu Claims Settlement Act 1998, a landmark Treaty of Waitangi settlement with Ngāi Tahu. It was one of nearly 90 places to be formally given dual names through this Act.
