= Lake Emma (New Zealand) =

Lake in the South Island of New Zealand

- Kirihonuhonu (Māori)
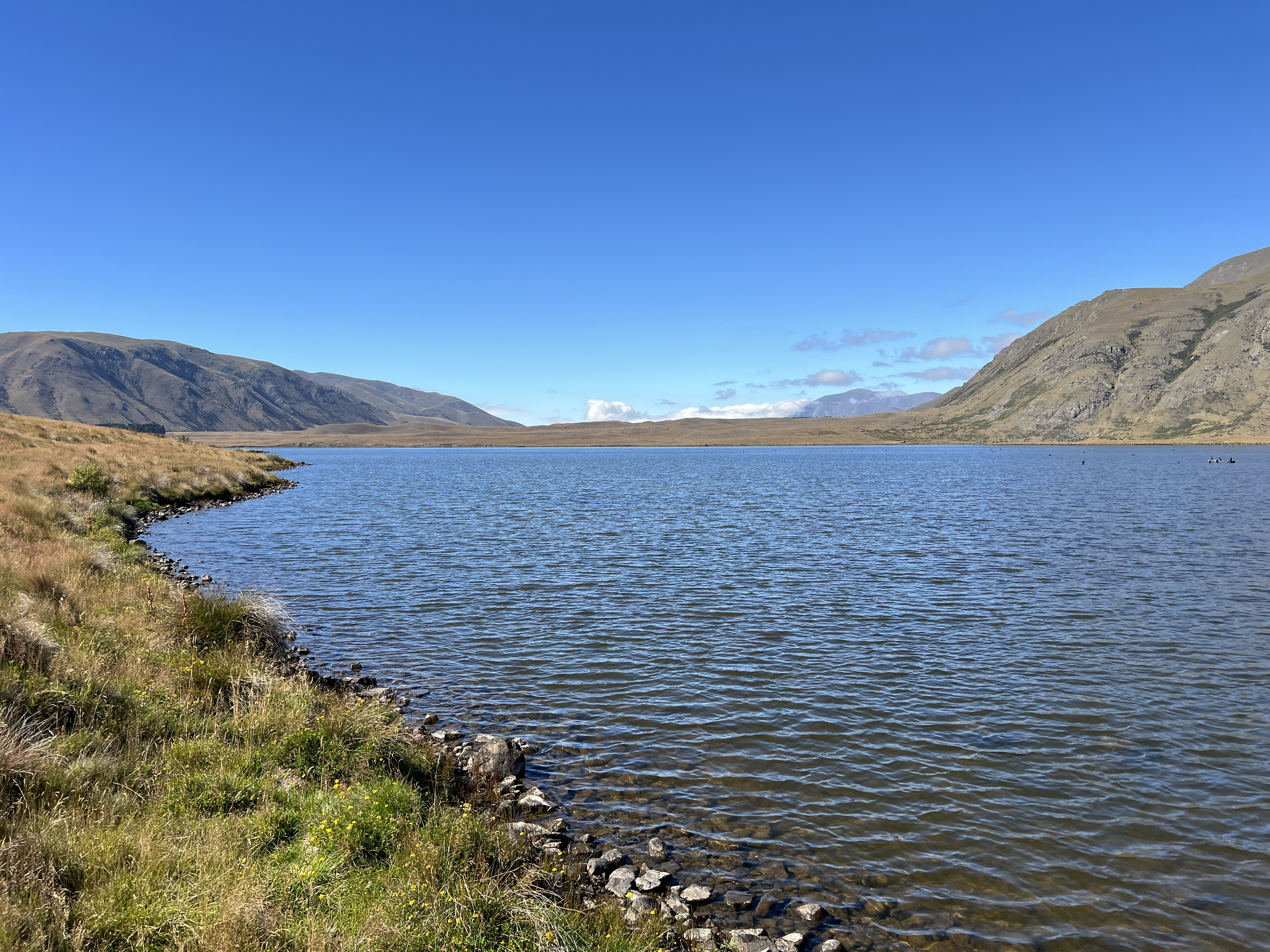
- Lake Emma
- Interactive map of Lake Emma
- Location: Ashburton District, Canterbury region, South Island
- Coordinates: 43°38′10″S 171°6′22″E
- Surface area: 166.8 ha (412 acres)
- Max. depth: 3 m (9.8 ft)
- Surface elevation: 654 m (2,146 ft)

Lake Emma (Māori: Kirihonuhonu), formerly known as Lake Acland, is a high-country lake located in inland Canterbury in the South Island of New Zealand. The lake is shallow, with a maximum depth of three metres (9.8 ft) and has a surface area of 166.8 hectares (412 acres). The lake is popular for fishing.

The name Lake Emma was given by Thomas Potts in April 1957, who named the lake after his wife, during an exploration of the land between the upper Ashburton and Rakaia rivers. The lake was later named as Lake Acland. This name was gazetted in 1953, but was reverted to Lake Emma in 1969.

Lake Emma is within the Hakatere Conservation Park, and is part of the Ashburton Lakes (Ōtūwharekai), an area of cultural importance to the iwi Ngāi Tahu because the lakes were a significant food-gathering area and also on a main route for travel between the east and west coasts of the South Island (Te Waipounamu).

Lake Emma is a protected area, designated as a Government Purpose Reserve under section 22 of the Reserves Act 1977, and is managed by the Department of Conservation. This type of reserve is used for wildlife management or other specified wildlife purposes.

The lake lies immediately to the south of the Hakatere Potts Road and is 30 kilometres (19 mi) by road northwest of the small settlement of Mount Somers. There is a nine-kilometre (5.6-mile) tramping and mountain biking track between Lake Camp and Lake Emma. There is a historic hut at Lake Emma with a tack shed and verandah. It was constructed between the late 1860s and 1890, and was used as a musterer's hut.

The health of the lake is monitored using two parameters, the trophic level index and the Lake Submerged Plant Indicator. The trophic level index for the lake (a measure of nutrient status) has ranged between 3.4 and 6 over the period 2009 to 2023, ranking as "Poor".

A case study report published by the Ministry for the Environment in 2023 reported that all the Ōtūwharekai/Ashburton Lakes were nutrient-enriched, with some at risk of deteriorating further into severe eutrophic states, changing from clear water with vegetation, to turbid algae-dominated water. The study reported that pastoral farming was the source for more than 90% of nutrients.
