= Māori Lakes =

Group of lakes in the South Island of New Zealand

- Ōtūwharekai (Māori)
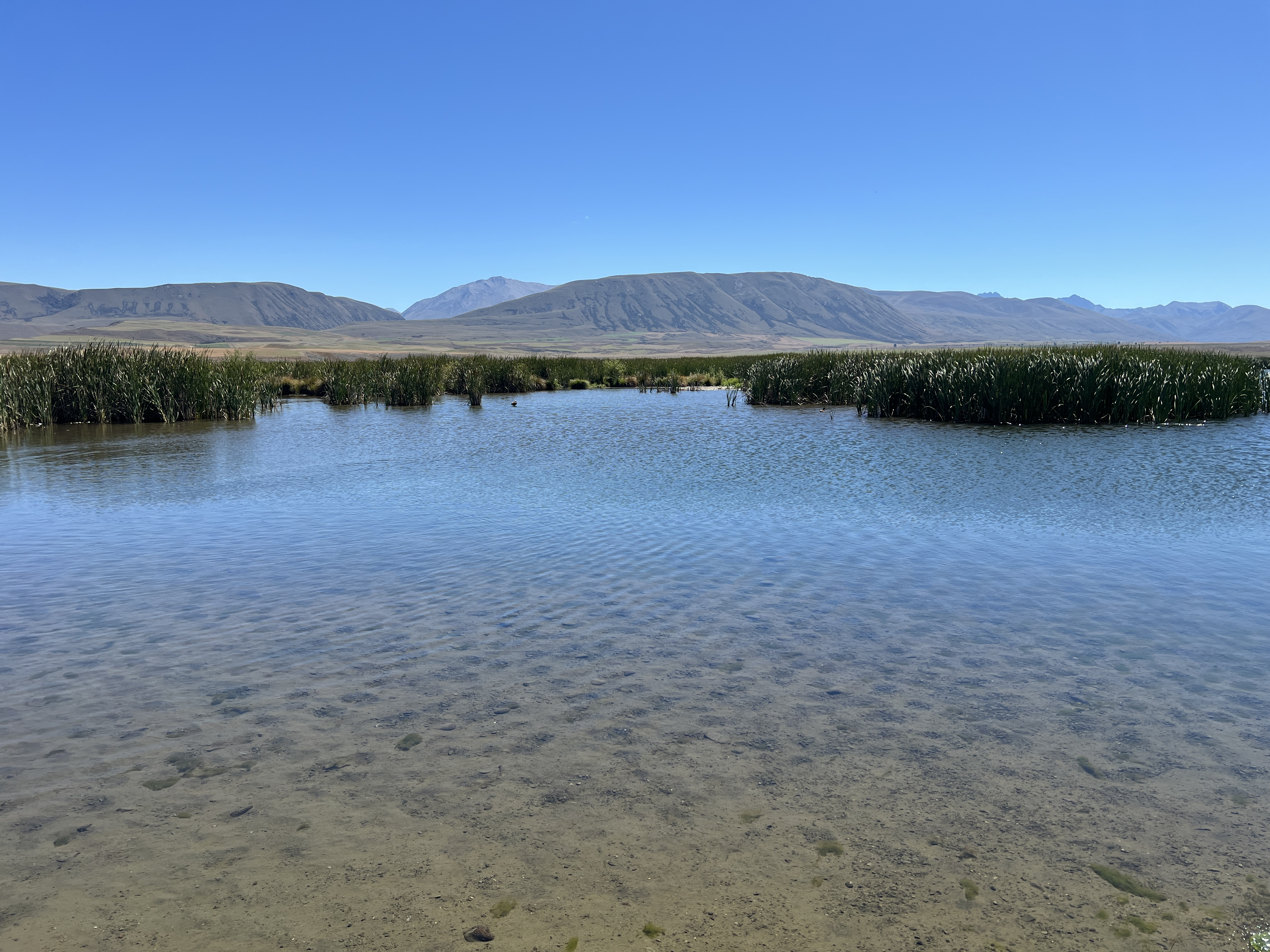
- Interactive map of Māori Lakes
- Location: Ashburton District, Canterbury region, South Island
- Coordinates: 43°34′18″S 171°10′32″E
- Max. depth: 2.3 m (7.5 ft)
- Surface elevation: 626 m (2,054 ft)

Māori Lakes (Māori: Ōtūwharekai) are a group of small and shallow high-country lakes located in inland Canterbury in the South Island of New Zealand. They lie within an area of 288 ha (710 acres) of wetland that is protected as the Māori Lakes Nature Reserve, and designated as a wildlife refuge, under s.14 of the Wildlife Act 1953. The lakes have a maximum depth of 0.8 m (2 ft 7 in). The lakes are a popular location for photography, and are known for birdlife, with common waterfowl such as ducks and swans. However, rare species have also been sighted there, including Australasian bittern, marsh crake, great crested grebe and the white heron (kōtuku).

The Māori Lakes are part of the wider Ashburton Lakes region (also known as Ōtūwharekai), an area of cultural importance to the iwi Ngāi Tahu because the lakes were a significant food-gathering area and also on a main route for travel between the east and west coasts of the South Island (Te Waipounamu).

The Māori Lakes can be accessed from the Hakatere Heron road, and are approximately 31 km (19 mi) west of Mount Somers. The Te Araroa trail passes around the east and southeast boundaries of the Māori Lakes wetland.

A case study report published by the Ministry for the Environment in 2023 reported that all the Ōtūwharekai / Ashburton Lakes were nutrient-enriched, with some at risk of deteriorating further into severe eutrophic states, changing from clear water with vegetation, to turbid algae-dominated water. The study reported that pastoral farming was the source for more than 90% of nutrients.
