= Lake Heron =

Lake in New Zealand

- Ōtūroto (Māori)
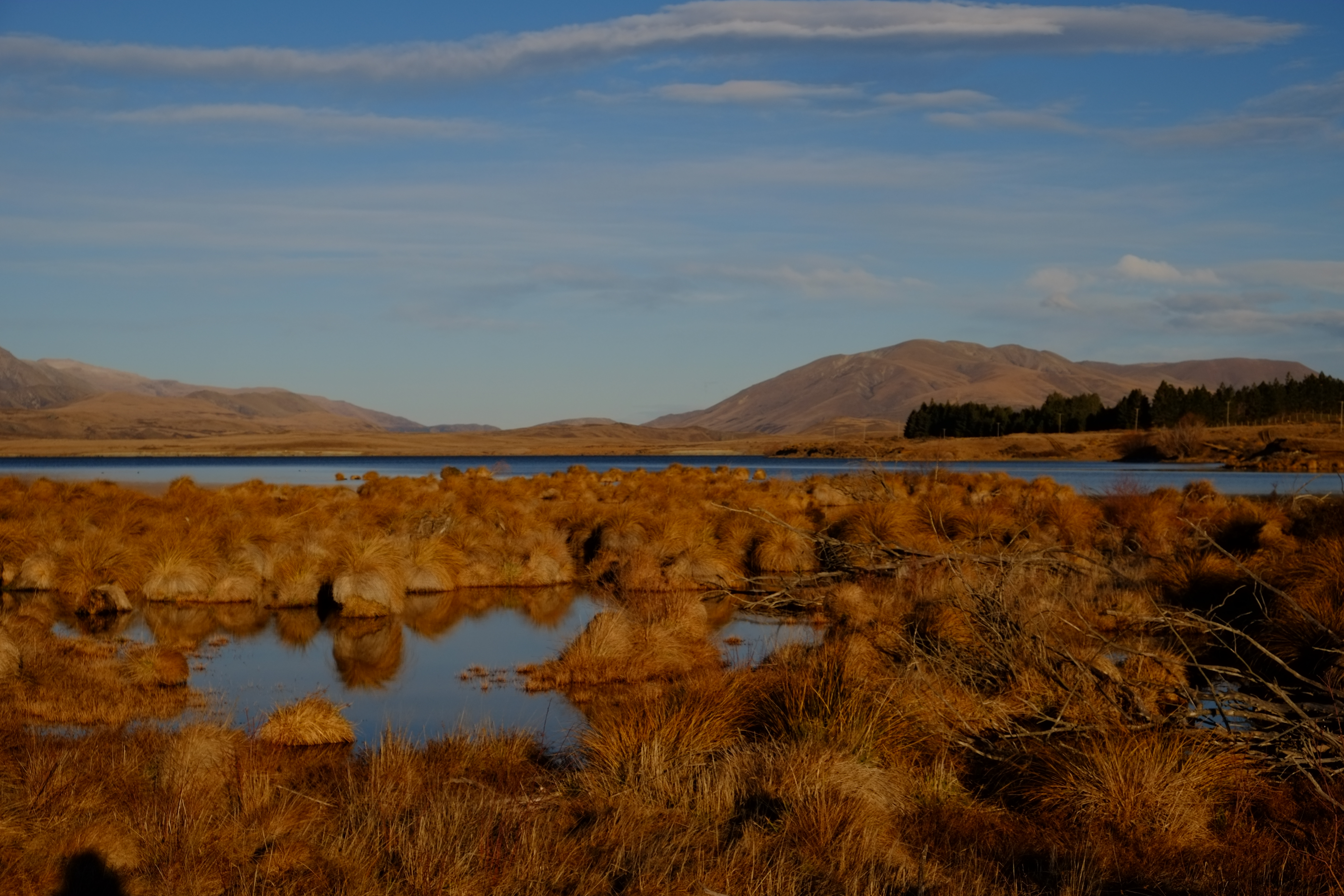
- Lake Heron and wetland plants
- Interactive map of Lake Heron
- Location: Ashburton District, Canterbury region, South Island
- Coordinates: 43°28′45″S 171°10′19″E
- Primary inflows: Swin River
- Primary outflows: Lake Stream
- Surface area: 695 ha (1,720 acres)
- Max. depth: 37 m (121 ft)
- Surface elevation: 691 m (2,267 ft)

Lake Heron (Māori: Ōtūroto) is a high-country lake located in inland Canterbury in the Ashburton District of the South Island of New Zealand. It is one of the Ashburton Lakes. The lake is managed by the Department of Conservation. The lake is a protected area, designated as the Lake Heron Nature Reserve under section 20 of the Reserves Act 1977, and as the Lake Heron Wildlife Refuge under section 14 of the Wildlife Act 1953. The southeastern shoreline of Lake Heron adjoins one of the parcels of protected conservation land in the Hakatere Conservation Park.

The surface elevation of the lake is 691 m (2,267 ft) and it has a surface area of 695 ha (1,720 acres). It is 40.5 km (25.2 mi) by road northwest of the small settlement of Mount Somers and is located in the upper catchment area of the Rakaia River. The land surrounding the lake is mostly marshland and low hills, but Mt Sugarloaf (altitude 1,238 m (4,062 ft)) rises steeply from the north-eastern shoreline. Mt Sugarloaf is an example of a roche moutonnée, a formation that has been shaped by the passing of a glacier. It is listed by the Ashburton District Council in their District Plan 2022 as an Area of Significant Nature Conservation Value.

Lake Heron / Ōtūroto is an area of cultural importance to the iwi Ngāi Tahu because it was a significant food-gathering area and was also on a main route for travel between the Hakatere and the Rakaia trails to Te Tai Poutini (the West Coast Region).

The ecological condition of the lake as measured by the composition of native and invasive plants in the water, was rated as "moderate" in 2023. The trophic level index for the lake (a measure of nutrient status) has ranged between 2.6 and 4.6 over the period 2009 to 2023, showing significant deterioration since 2014. In 2023 the water quality was rated as "Poor" (eutrophic). A case study report published by the Ministry for the Environment in 2023 reported that all the Ōtūwharekai / Ashburton Lakes were nutrient-enriched, with some at risk of deteriorating further into severe eutrophic states, changing from clear water with vegetation, to turbid algae-dominated water. The study reported that pastoral farming was the source for more than 90% of nutrients.

The Lake Heron station that borders the lake is a high-country farm of just under 20,000 ha (49,000 acres). The station has been held by the Todhunter family for over a century. As of 2025 the owners of Lake Heron station are members of the Ashburton Lakes Catchment Group that has been formed to respond to the declining water quality in the lakes.

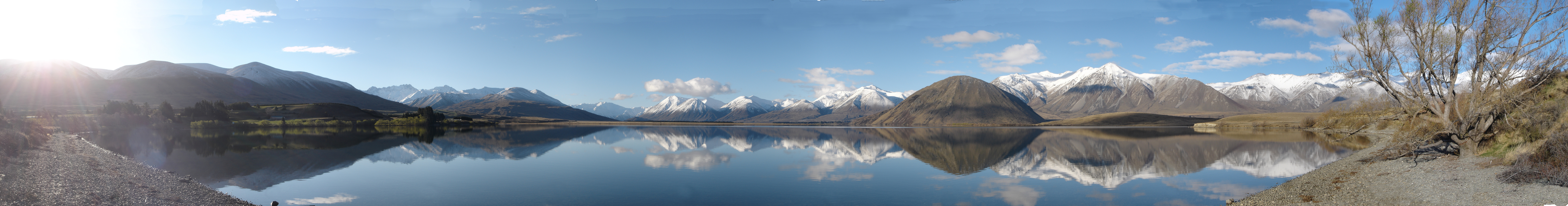
A panoramic view featuring snowy mountains reflecting in the lake

== See also ==
- List of lakes in New Zealand
