= Bobbie Barwell =

Early New Zealand woman photographer

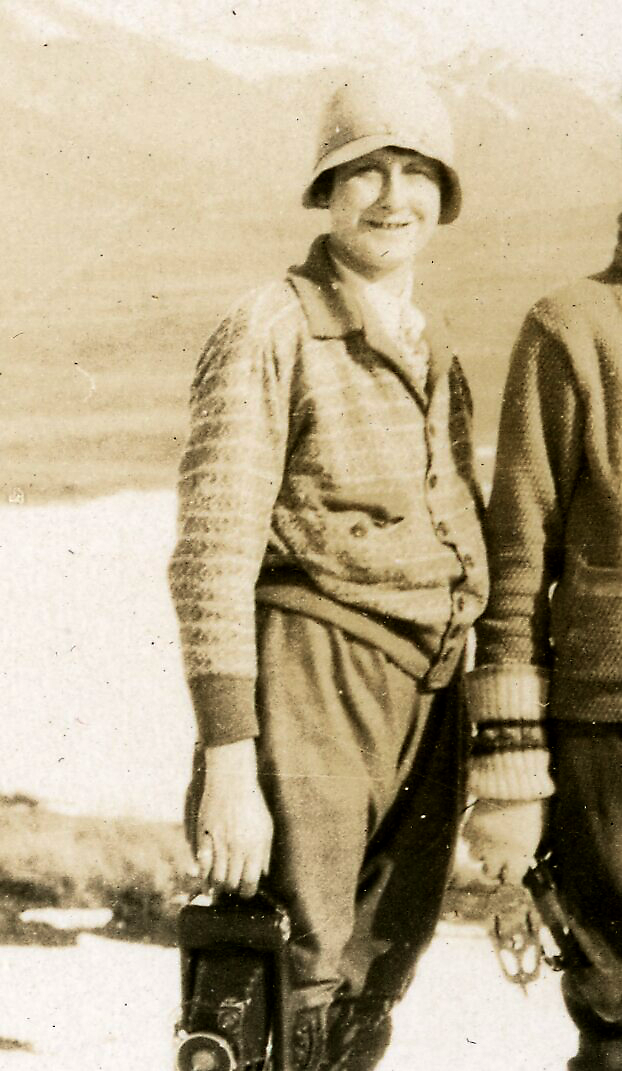
- Barwell at Lake Camp with her camera, 1932
- Born: 25 August 1898; Ashburton
- Died: 14 August 1985 (aged 86); Ashburton
- Resting place: Ashburton Cemetery

Bobbie Barwell (née Mildred Annie Hickman; 25 August 1895 – 14 August 1985) was a New Zealand photographer. She was the first professional woman photographer in Ashburton, and photographed a number of well-known people, including three New Zealand prime ministers. Barwell's photograph of Lake Pukaki was used as the inspiration for the image on the 1940 New Zealand £5 note.

== Early life and education ==
Mildred Annie Hickman, who preferred to be called Bob or Bobbie, was born on 25 August 1895 in Ashburton. She attended primary school in Ashburton, and may later have attended the Canterbury College School of Art.

== Career ==
Barwell married Thomas Claude Barwell (1867–1950), who was 31 years older than she was, in 1925. Thomas may also have been a photographer.

It is unclear when Barwell became interested in photography. She worked as a retoucher for Frank Denton in Whanganui, and for Henry Herbert Clifford at Clifford Studios in Christchurch. In 1931 she bought the Vita photographic studio in Ashburton, after the death of owner Charles Arthur Cooper. Barwell operated as Barwell Studios, taking studio portraits, wedding, sports group and school photographs, until 1947 when she sold the business and began working for Charles Tindall, another local photographer. She used a Century Camera with glass plate negatives for her studio work, and a Kodak Autographic roll film camera for outdoors work. Barwell was also known as a landscape photographer, as she was a keen tramper and an inaugural member of Ashburton Tramping Club.

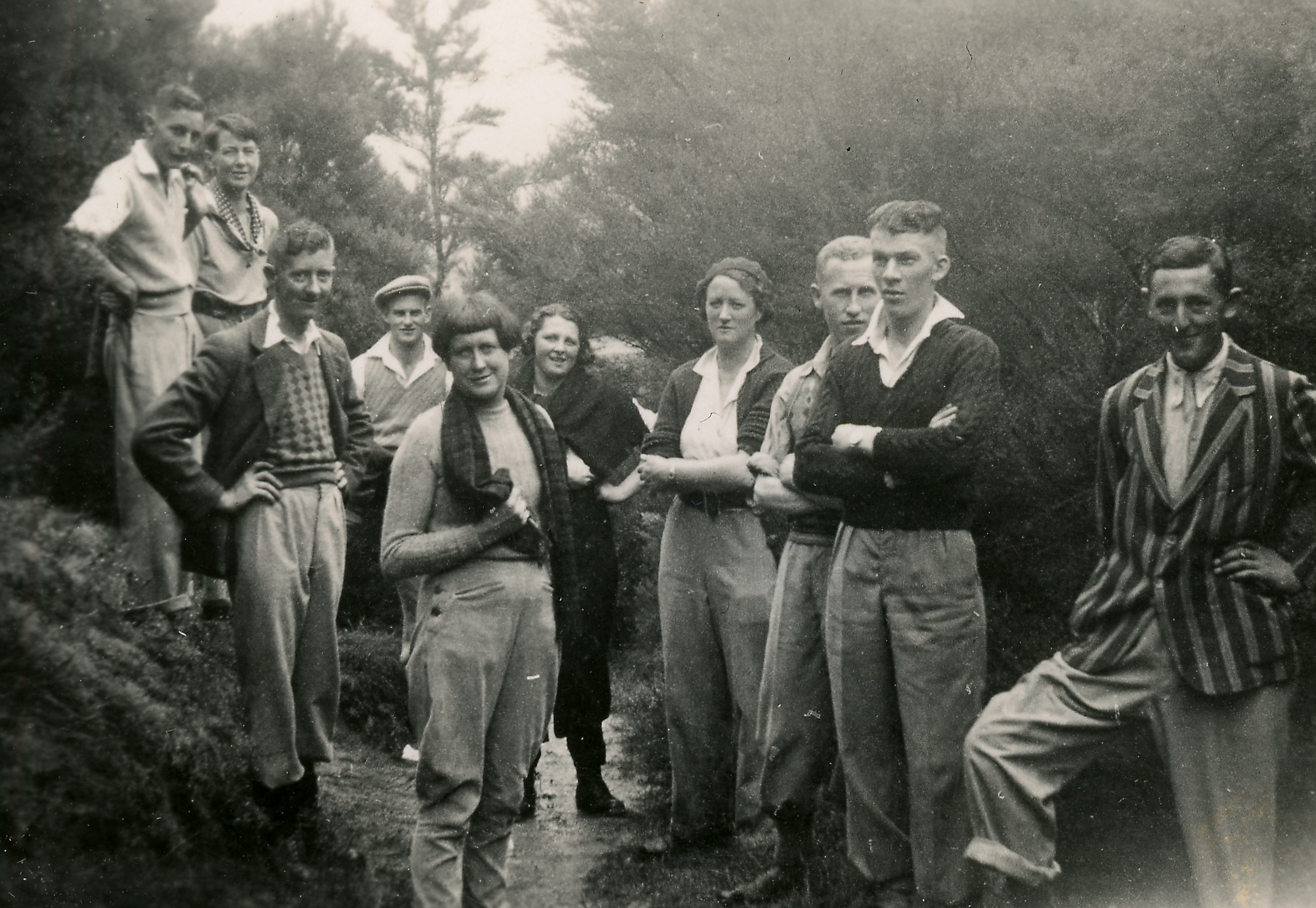
Ashburton Tramping Club in Peel Forest, c. 1930s. Bobbie Barwell is front and centre wearing a scarf.

Famous subjects Barwell photographed included Lady Bledisloe in 1933, Ngaio Marsh, trans-Tasman aviator Charles Kingsford Smith, and prime ministers Michael Joseph Savage, Peter Fraser and Walter Nash. Barwell was employed as an official photographer for the Royal New Zealand Air Force, taking photographs of new pilots and passing out parades at the Ashburton RNZAF station, which operated from 1942 to 1944.

Barwell was renowned for driving her MGs around Ashburton, owning a TA or TB, and a 1947 green TC which she imported new from England. When the Queen and the Duke of Edinburgh visited Ashburton in 1981 she used the fact that the Duke had previously owned the same model as a way to attract the Duke's attention.

Barwell died aged 87 on 14 August 1985 in Ashburton. Her funeral was held at St Stephen's Anglican Church Chapel. She was predeceased by her husband.

== Image of Lake Pukaki ==
Barwell's 1930s photograph of Lake Pukaki in the Canterbury Region was used as the basis for an etching used on the New Zealand £5 note issued by the Reserve Bank in 1940, apparently without her knowledge or permission. Barwell reported that local Member of Parliament Horace Herring had a print of her photograph, and had commented that the government might be interested in using it for promotional purposes.

Selected photos by Bobbie Barwell

Lake Pukaki, 1930s

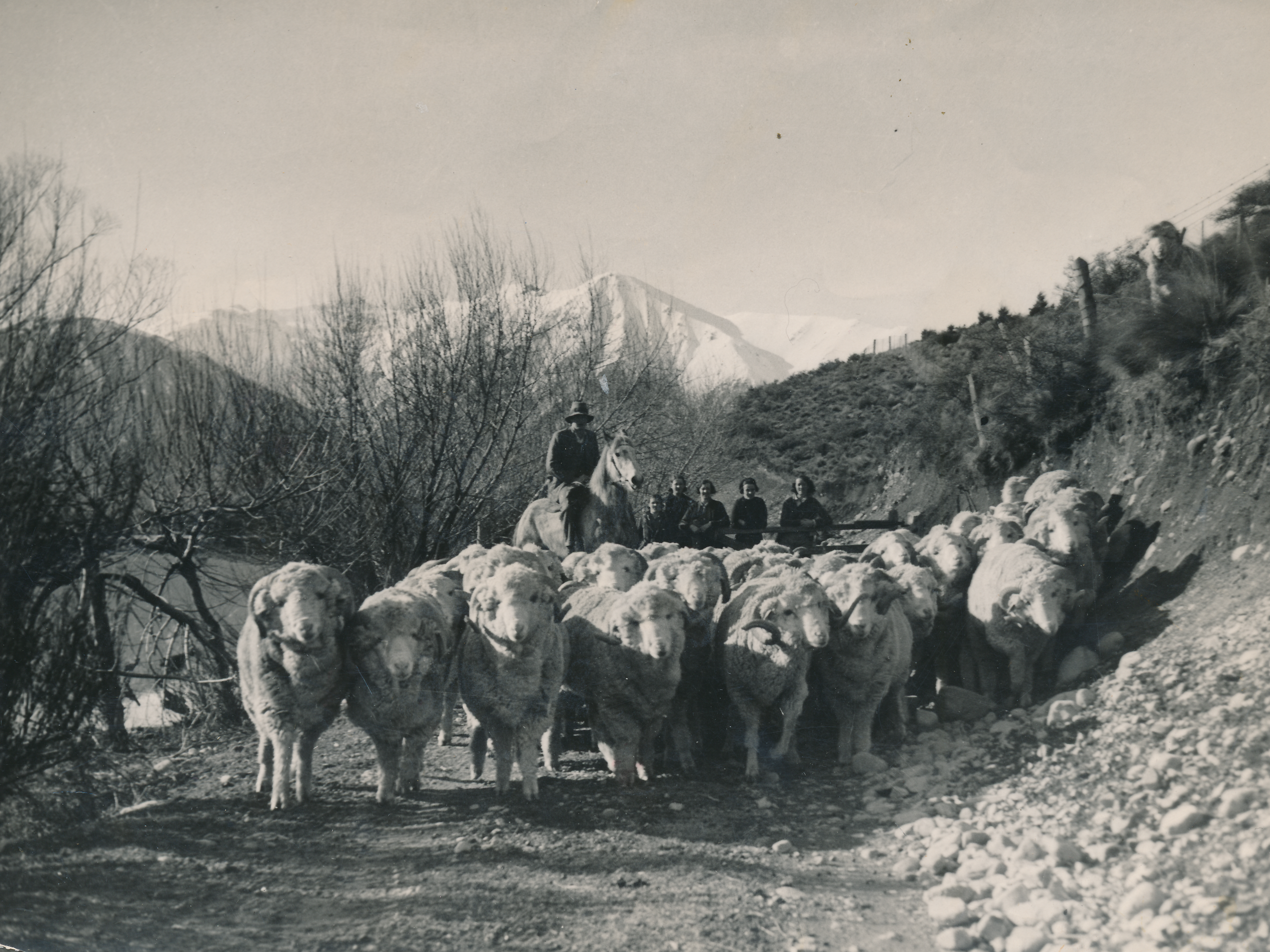
Flock of merino rams near Lake Heron

John Orr & Co. shop window, Ashburton, 1930s

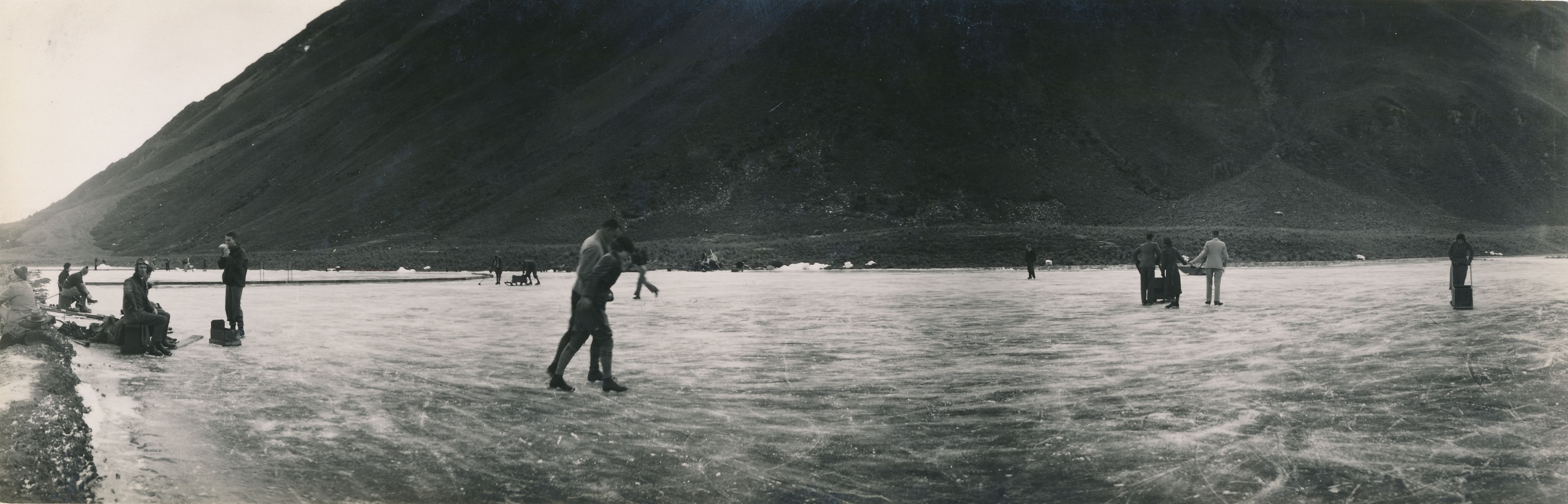
Ice rink near Mount Harper

== Legacy ==
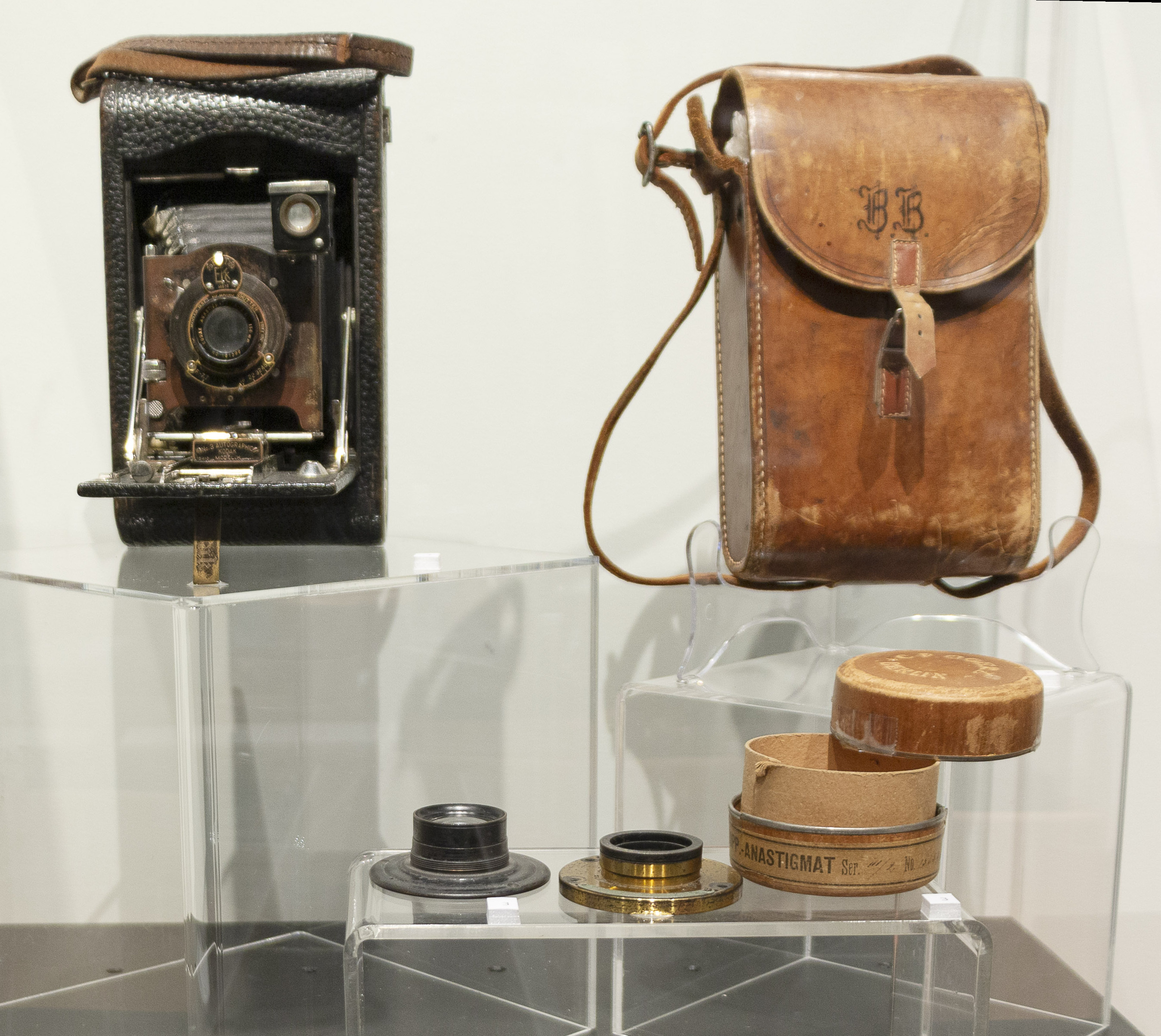
Barwell's No. 3 Autographic Kodak Model H

Barwell was the subject of an exhibition at Ashburton Art Gallery and Museum, Bobbie Barwell: Capturing People and Places, which ran from 28 September to 18 December 2022. The museum also holds a number of Barwell's drawings and sketches, and her Kodak Autographic roll film camera. Although Barwell took some of her glass plate negatives when she sold Barwell Studios in 1947, the ones that remained were destroyed.

The Museum of New Zealand Te Papa Tongarewa holds eight landscape photographs by Barwell Studios.
