= Lake Clearwater (village) =

- Village
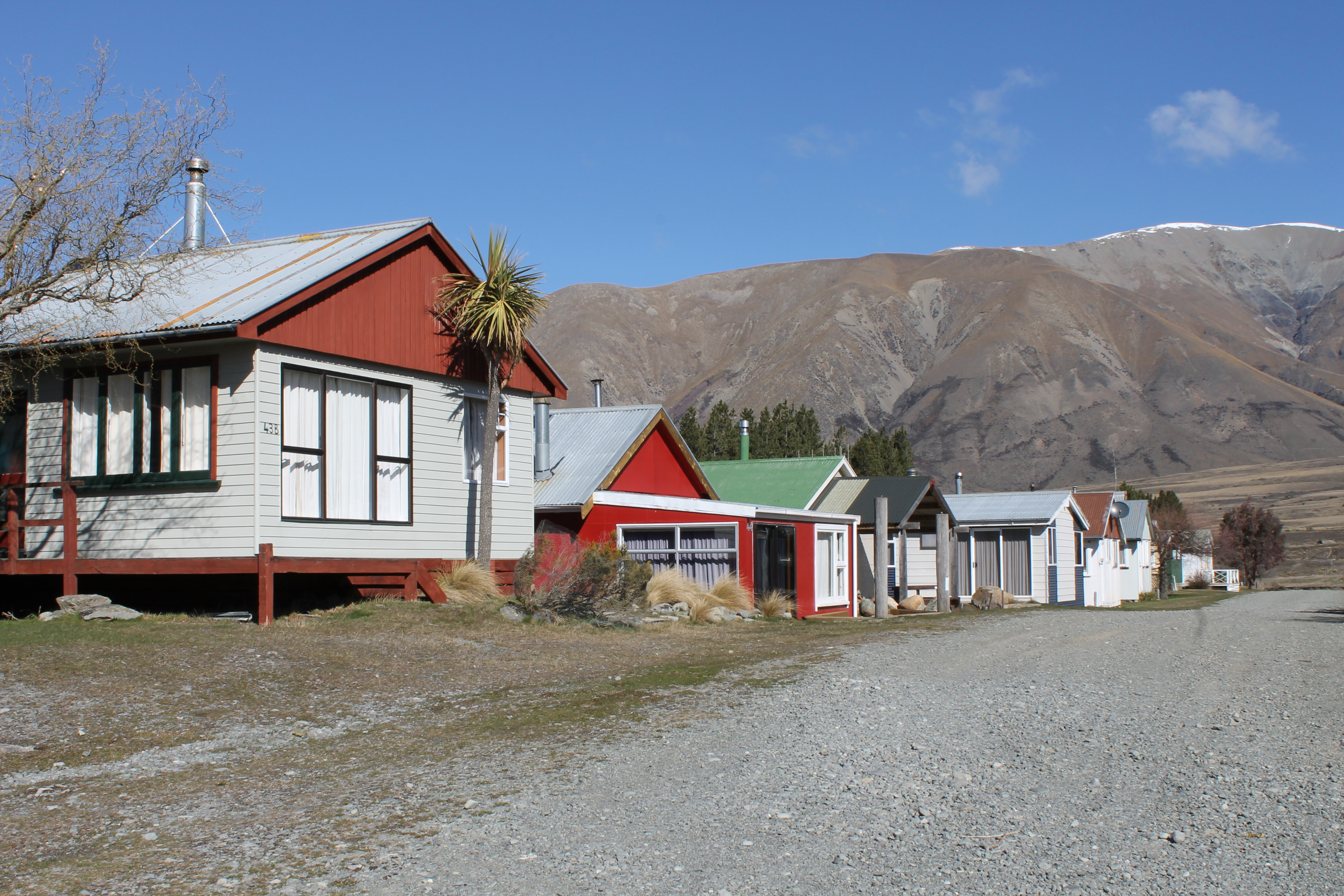
- Baches in Lake Clearwater
- Interactive map of Lake Clearwater
- Coordinates: 43.61°S 171.047°E
- Country: New Zealand
- Region: Canterbury
- Territorial authority: Ashburton District
- Ward: Western
- Electorates: Rangitata; Te Tai Tonga (Māori)

Government
  - Territorial authority: Ashburton District Council
  - Regional council: Environment Canterbury
  - Mayor of Ashburton: Liz McMillan
  - Rangitata MP: James Meager
  - Te Tai Tonga MP: Tākuta Ferris

Lake Clearwater is a village in the Ashburton District of New Zealand between a lake of the same name and the nearby Lake Camp. The village lies within the Ōtūwharekai/Ashburton Lakes region.

The area for the village was first laid out in 1920, and the land was gifted to the people of the Ashburton District by the run-holders of the Mount Possession Station, in a series of gifts in 1926, 1949 and 1964. The land is held in trust for the purposes of enabling small holiday homes (a bach) and picnicking. The sections in the village are leased to owners on a perpetually renewable lease. Part of the gifting arrangement included a requirement that 0.81 ha (2 acres) was to "be set apart for use as a camping ground for visitors and similar uses for the benefit of the county of Ashburton". While the earlier buildings in the village were small and simple, in recent years higher quality dwellings have been built. There are around 180 individual dwellings in the village, as well as a reserve for overnight camping.

The adjoining Lake Camp is designated as a recreation reserve and is owned by the Department of Conservation. However, both Lake Camp and the Lake Clearwater village are administered by the Ashburton District Council. Lake Camp is popular for recreation in summer, including swimming and water skiing. In 2024, the community raised concerns about the low level of Lake Camp, and advocated for the re-instatement of a former diversion of the Balmacaan Stream to add inflows to the lake to improve the recreational potential. The diversion had been in place for 50 years, but a resource consent for the diversion expired in 2020. The Ashburton District Council decided not to seek a new resource consent, because of the high costs and uncertain outcome.

A case study report into declining water quality, published by the Ministry for the Environment in 2023, reported that all the Ōtūwharekai / Ashburton Lakes were nutrient-enriched, with some at risk of deteriorating further into severe eutrophic states, changing from clear water with vegetation, to turbid algae-dominated water. The study reported that pastoral farming was the source for more than 90% of nutrients. Seepage of human waste at Lake Clearwater and Lake Camp was a contributor, but represented less than 10% of the nutrient inflow. As part of a 30 year plan for Lake Camp and Lake Clearwater published in 2022, the Ashburton District Council required bach owners to install a holding tank for sewage by 30 June 2023, to help prevent further degradation of the lake environment.

== Demographics ==
Lake Clearwater is in the Ashburton Lakes statistical area, which covers 2,995.14 km^{2} (1,156.43 sq mi)

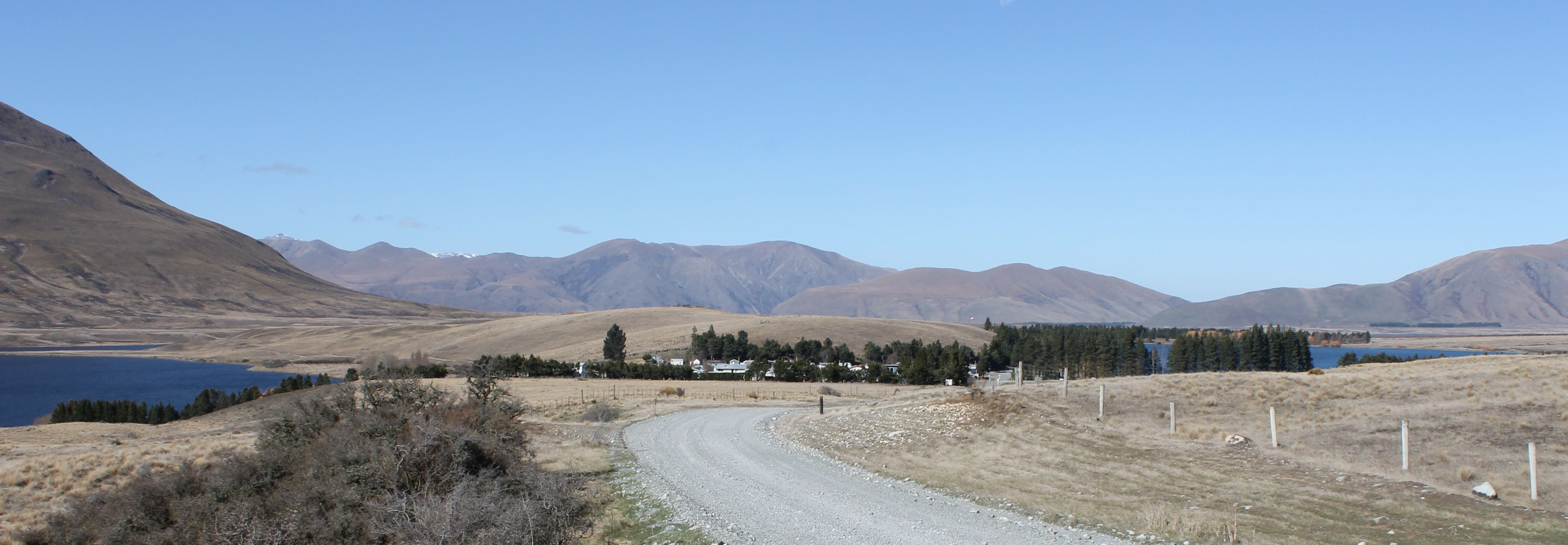
Distant view of the village Lake Clearwater, with Lake Clearwater on its left and Lake Camp on its right
