= Ashburton Art Gallery and Heritage Centre =

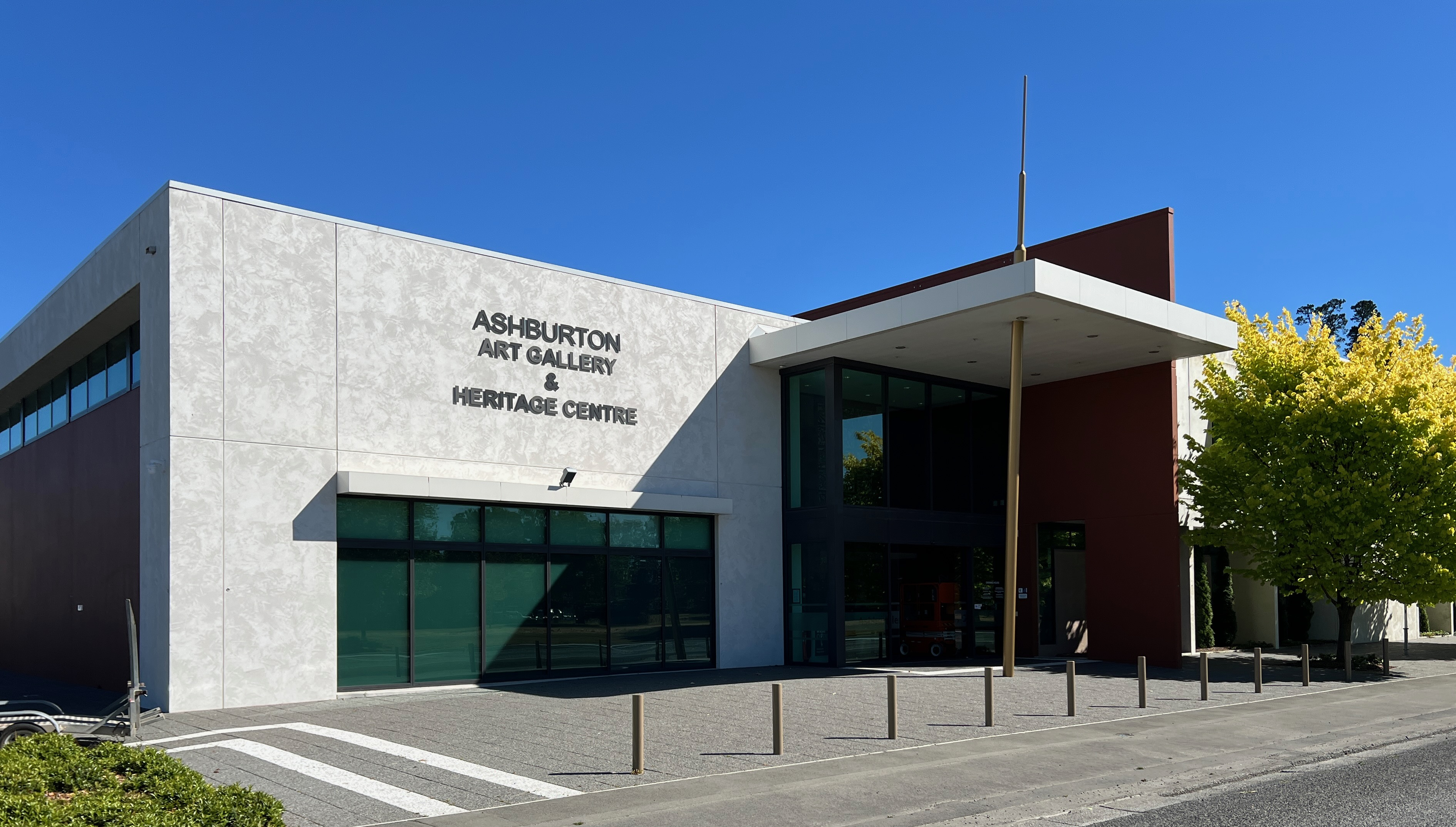
- West Street building (opened 2014)
- Former names: Ashburton Museum, Ashburton Art Gallery
- Established: 2014
- Location: Ashburton, New Zealand
- Coordinates: 43°54′07″S 171°44′59″E
- Type: Public museum, Art gallery
- Director: Shirin Khosraviani
- Parking: On site (no charge)
- Website: ashburtonmuseum.co.nz; ashburtonartgallery.org.nz

Ashburton Art Gallery and Heritage Centre is an art gallery and museum complex located in the town of Ashburton, New Zealand, owned and operated by the Ashburton District Council. The Ashburton Museum opened in 1972 and moved along with the Ashburton Art Gallery into former County Council buildings in 1995. The museum moved into a new purpose-built facility in 2014, the art gallery following it in 2015. Both institutions merged into a single organisation under the Ashburton District Council in 2021.

== Ashburton Art Gallery ==
In 1983 Ashburton Society of Arts president Alison Ryde proposed an arts centre with public exhibition space for local artists and craftspeople. In 1985 the Ashburton Arts Centre Association was set up with the aim of creating an art gallery in Ashburton. It initially focussed on securing Ashburton Borough Council land on West Street, but permission was not forthcoming so their efforts were devoted to fundraising instead. Four years later the group partnered with the Ashburton Historical Society to petition the District Council for a space in the former County Council building.

=== Staff ===
Curator/Manager Kathryn Mitchell was appointed in 2005 and left in 2011 to take up a tutoring role at Southern Institute of Technology. She was replaced as curator by Shirin Khosraviani. The Art Gallery was managed by Ashburton Art Gallery Incorporated until 2021, when it was merged with the Museum and came under the management of Ashburton District Council.

=== Collections ===
The gallery has a permanent collection of over 700 works, with over 2000 more on long-term loan. A significant part of its collection is works by Ashburton-born children's book author and illustrator David Elliot, including drawings from books such as The Making of the Word Witch (a collaboration with Margaret Mahy), The Moon and Farmer McPhee and Lewis Carroll's The Hunting of the Snark. Other artists represented in its permanent collection are Rudolf Gopas, Nigel Brown, Philip Clairmont, and Philip Trusttum.

The gallery partners with the Zonta International Club of Ashburton to offer an annual Zonta Ashburton Female Art Award. Along with a cash prize, the winner wins the opportunity to hold a solo exhibition in the gallery.

== Ashburton Museum ==
The Ashburton Historical Society, led by Harry Scotter, Ethel McQuilkin, and Ellis Woods, first met on 30 October 1958. Their aim was to establish a museum in Ashburton, and the collection was first housed in a building on the corner of Cass and Tancred streets. In 1960 librarian Thelma McArtney joined the Historical Society committee and stressed the importance of collecting photographs, and photographing buildings in danger of demolition. Six years later the Society arranged a display of local history in Balmoral Hall, previously the Assembly Hall of Ashburton Technical College. The society hoped in the late 1960s to move into the former Ashburton Library building, vacated in 1967 when the new library was built, but was unsuccessful.

The Ashburton Borough Council offered the Society a small building on Tancred Street that was originally the Hospital Board Office, later the County Engineer's office, and eventually a women's rest room. Dubbed Pioneer Hall, it was Ashburton's first museum building, and opened in March 1972. It was staffed by volunteers and opened every afternoon except Saturdays and every Friday evening, and was run by the Ashburton Historical Society which became an incorporated society in 1973.

In 1974 one of the former Ashburton Technical School buildings space became available in Cameron Street, and museum began moving into the more spacious rooms in 1976. The new building was formally opened by Canterbury Museum's Roger Duff in October 1978. The Cameron Street building eventually proved to be too small, cold, and damp, with no fire alarm or extinguishers, so in 1989, together with the Arts Centre Association, the Historical Society approached the District Council to share building space in the former County Council offices on Baring Square.

=== Staff ===
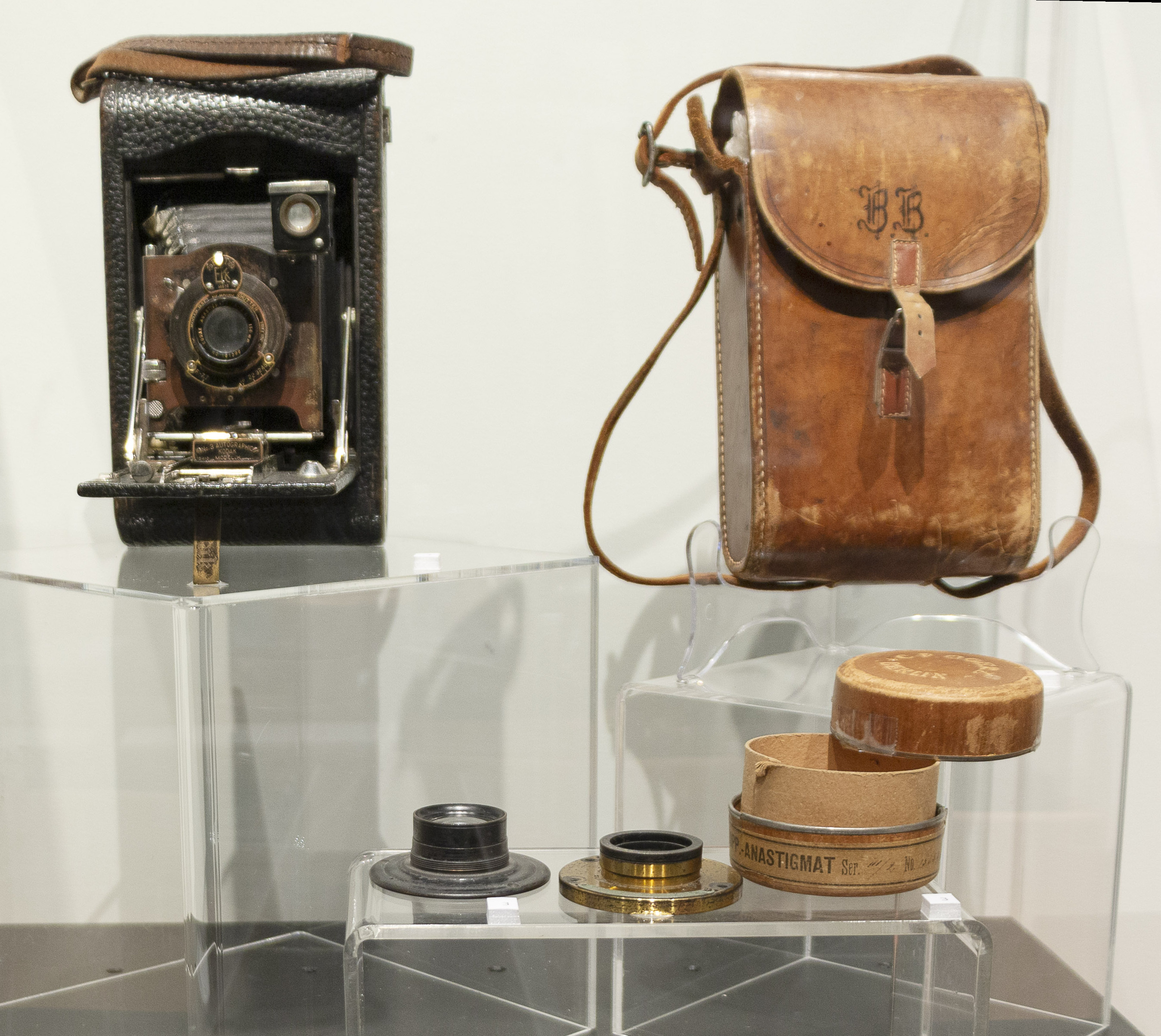
Bobbie Barwell’s No. 3 Autographic Kodak Model H and camera bag inscribed with the initials B.B., displayed in 2022 exhibit Bobbie Barwell: Capturing People and Places

By 1978 the museum had a paid staff member, Mrs M. E. Kenny, who worked four hours a week, increasing to six hours a week by 1987. She was replaced that year by Rita Wright who with the assistance of the Historical Society committee catalogued the collection, initially on a cross-referenced card system and eventually databasing it in PastPerfect. Ashburton Museum heavily depended on Lynda Wallace of the museum liaison service which operated through the 1980s and early 1990s. Wright continued as curator for almost 20 years, and was succeeded by Michael Hanrahan in December 2006. Ashburton DIstrict Council took over management of the museum in 2014 with the opening of the Heritage Centre.

=== Collections ===
The museum has both cultural history and natural history collections, as well as approximately 250,000 photographs; significant items include

- A 90 million year old petrified woord found on an Alford Forest farm in the 1990s
- A doll named Sarah Jane brought to New Zealand on one of the first settler ships in the 1850s
- a large collection of negatives from Ashburton commercial photographer Charles Tindall, mostly taken during the 1960s and 1970s
- A similarly large photographic collection from Gordon Binsted

== Baring Square building ==
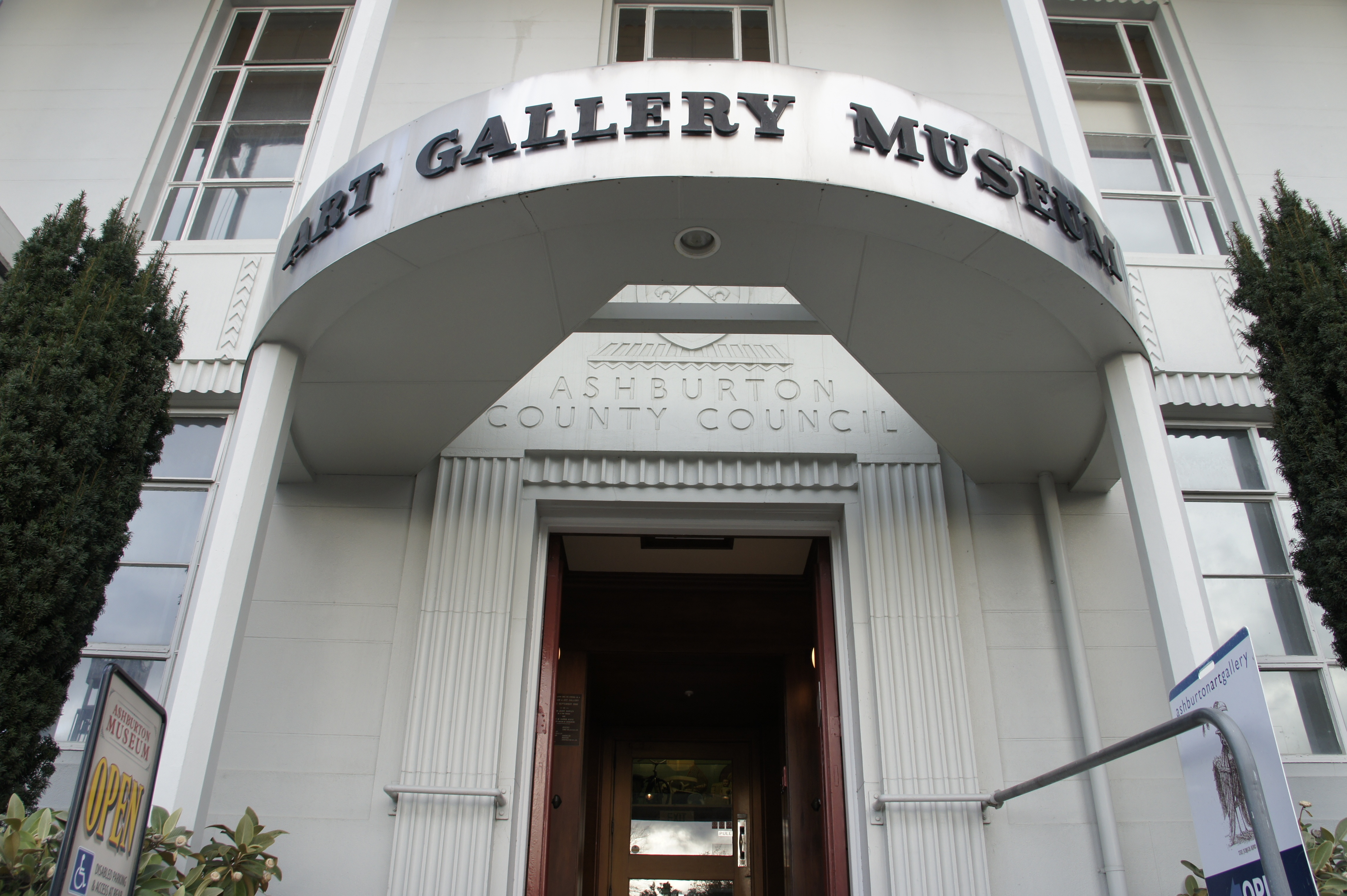
The Art Gallery and Museum's Baring Square building. "Ashburton County Council" can be seen in the door lintel.

A joint art gallery and library building had been discussed as far back as 1963 when the new Ashburton Library was built. A public meeting chaired by Michael Fowler in March 1985 was supportive of an arts centre in Ashburton, and a steering committee headed by Jack Ross commissioned a report released in March 1986. It recommended several options, including refurbishing the Cameron Street museum building, building a new museum on the main road, or using the Ashburton County Council offices on Baring Street East. These offices, designed by Christchurch-based Cecil Wood and local architect W. Thomas, were opened on 7 April 1938, and following additions and alterations in the 1960s and 1974 were still in use, so the option was not considered. When local government was amalgamated in 1989, however, the new Ashburton District Council chose to operate from the former Borough Council building and the County Council offices were left vacant.

Initial estimates of the cost of altering the Baring Square building was $2.65 million, but a working party composed of councillors and representatives from the Ashburton Arts Centre Association and the Ashburton Historical Society chose a less costly refurbishment plan of $540,000. In November 1992 they received a $245,000 grant from the Lottery Board, matching a similar amount already raised, the building was leased for a peppercorn rental in December 1994 and work began. The Art Gallery and Museum moved into this refurbished space in September 1995, the museum having the ground floor and the art gallery the top floor, and the building was formally opened on September 16 by Deputy Mayor Joy Harris and local MP Jenny Shipley.

At this point, the Historical Society changed its name the Ashburton Museum and Historical Society, and the Rita Wright's position of curator became a full-time one. The museum built interactive ground-floor galleries, and developed map and photograph storage facilities in the former County Council strongroom.

== West Street building ==
By 2001 concerns were raised by the Historical Society that the Baring Street building was proving unsatisfactory, with crowded collection storage in old County Council garages behind the building, a leaking roof, and ageing air conditioners. Calls for a new storage area prompted a review of the long-term plan for both organisations. By 2007 the Council had decided to proceed with a new purpose-build complex rather than continued upgrading of the Baring Street building. The upgrade cost for Baring Street was estimated at more than $3.5 million, $1 million more than was budgeted for in the Council's 2006–2017 long term plan.

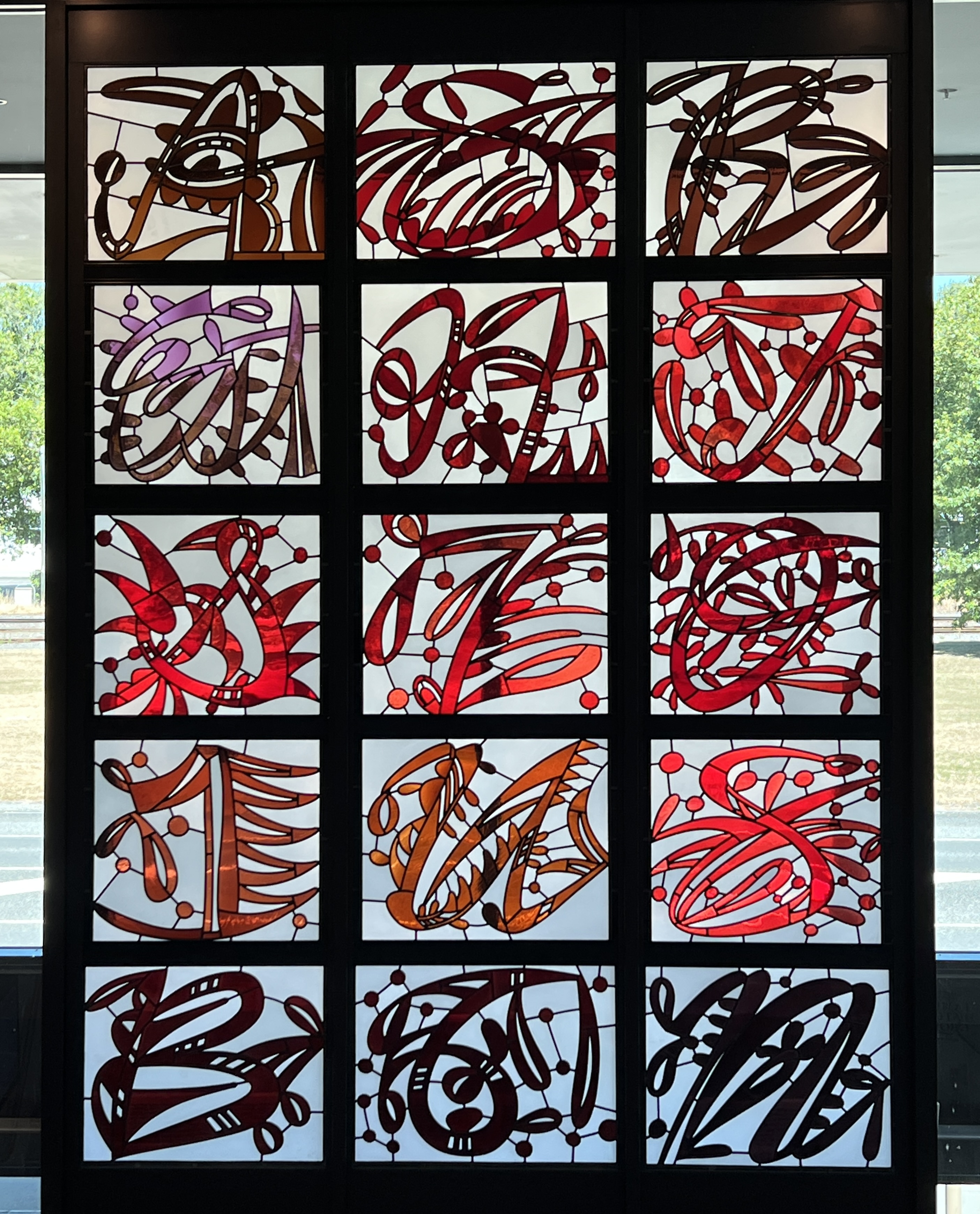
Stained glass window in the atrium created by Philip Trusttum in 2001

In 2009 a $6 million two-storey museum and gallery twice the size of the existing facility was proposed for a council-owned site on West Street; the cost would be offset by selling the existing building to the Ashburton Trust for $2 million to be turned into a hotel. The Council was to fund an additional $1 million from the $2.5 million budgeted in its long-term plan, and seek the remaining $0.5 million from government sources. Bradford Building Ltd tendered $6.6 million for the work. The architectural plan has the museum on the ground floor and art gallery on the second floor, and most members of the art gallery committee refused to sign a statement of support for the project, wanting ground-floor space (adding almost $200,000 to the building cost); the gallery's curator Kathryn Mitchell threatened to resign over the impasse.

The West Street site was in a residential zone, and a resource consent to begin construction was granted with some conditions in 2010. In April 2012, the site's neighbours challenged the council in the Environment Court, which delayed construction by 97 weeks. By this time the Ashburton Trust had decided against purchasing the Baring Street building, but the District Council resolved to continue with the project. The $6.3 million building had become controversial, with a street protest by 2000 residents, a petition with 4200 signatures, and over 180 public submissions opposing it and the projected 1.7 per cent rates rise it would entail.

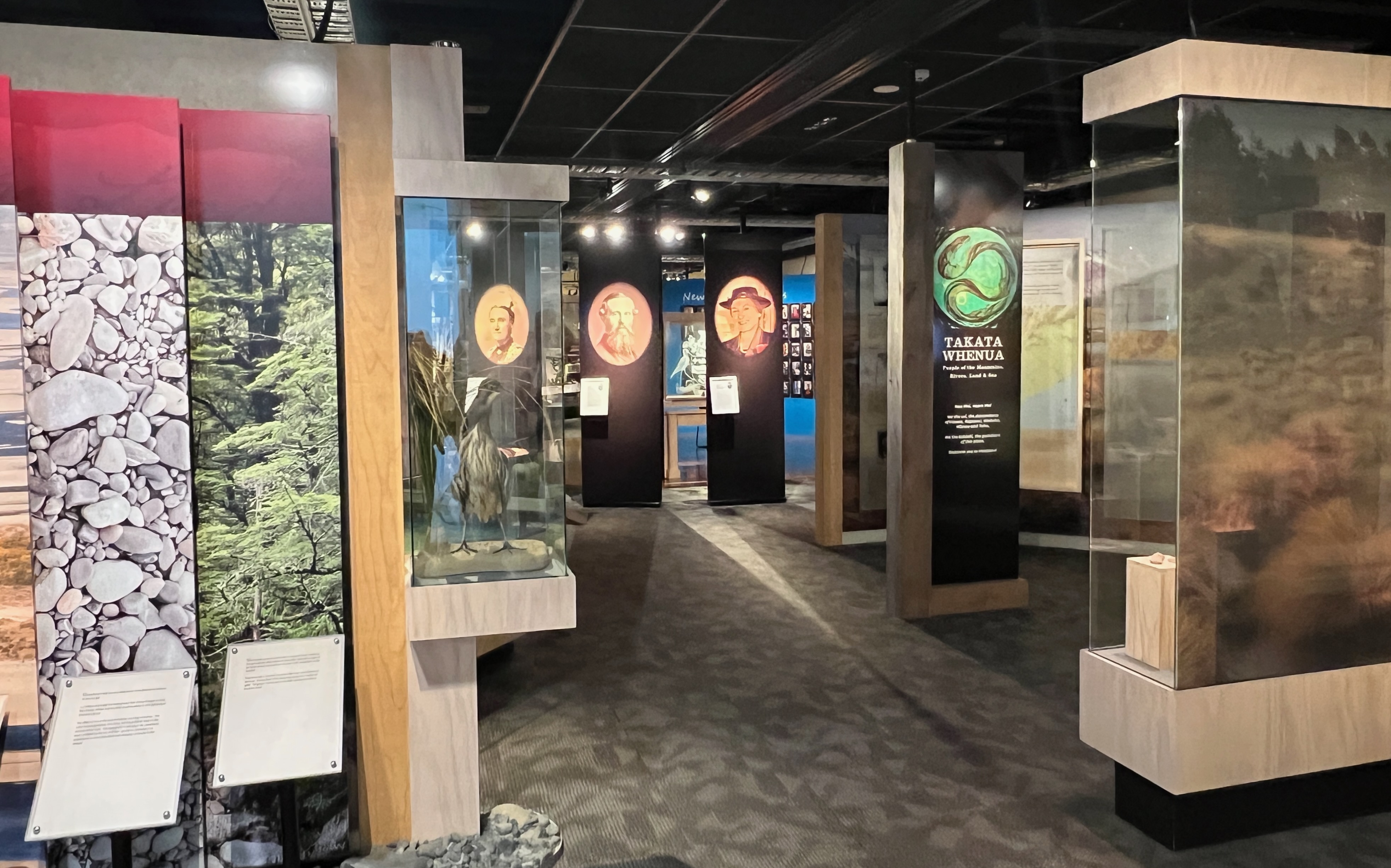
Heritage Centre exhibition gallery

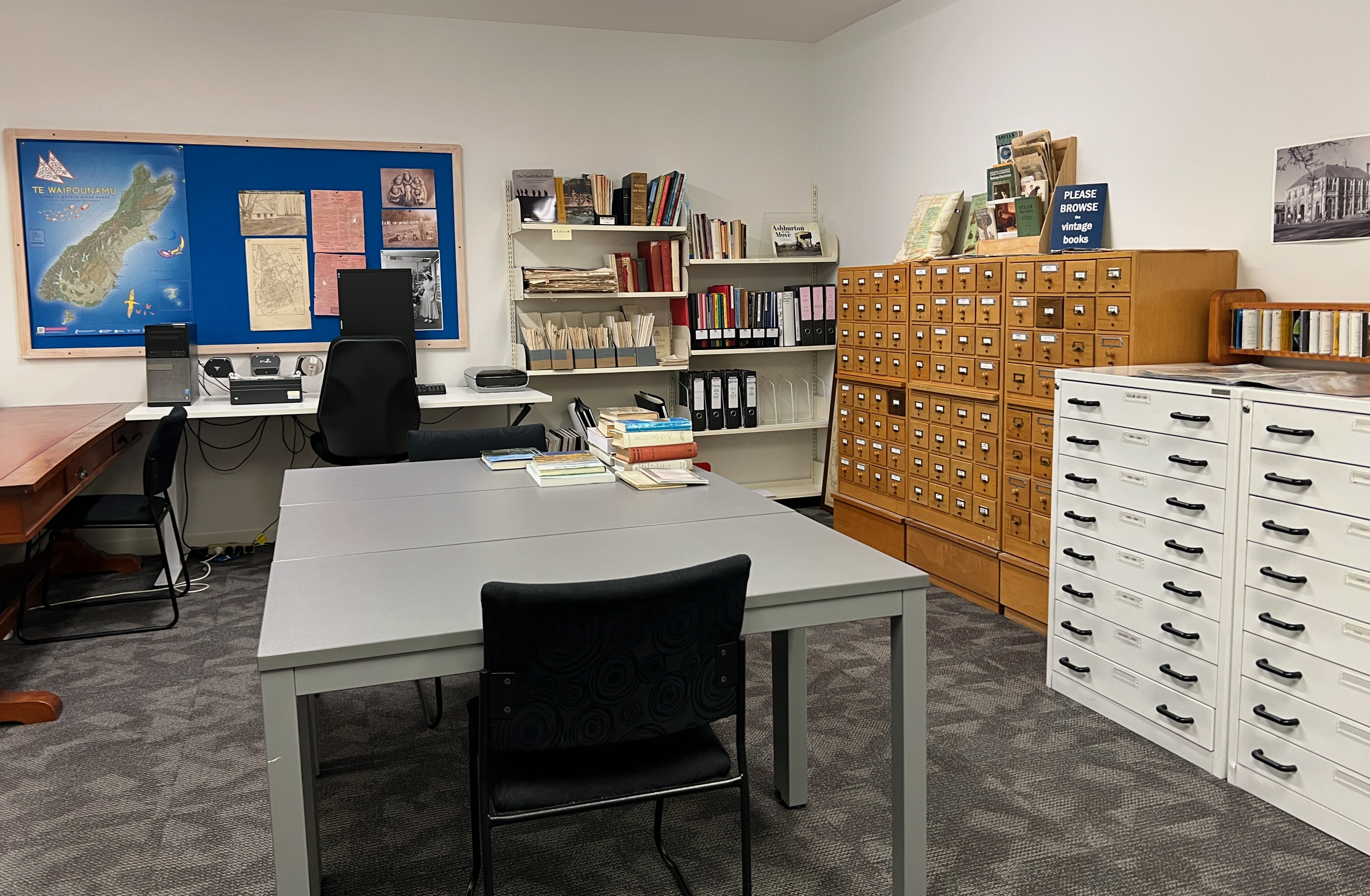
Heritage Centre research room

The building was completed in 2014 at a cost of $10 million, $4 million over budget; an independent review found problems with allocating costs for fit-out and furnishing, a lack of consultation, and failure to tender the design to architecture firms, including ones with a history of building exhibition spaces. The museum closed its Baring Street premises in May 2014 and spent three months moving collections into the new exhibition space and Heritage Centre in the completed building. The exhibition space included a working model of Canterbury irrigation, a wall of 200 portraits, and a soundtrack that combines the sound of the nor-west wind with a specially written waiata. The gallery closed on May 2 and had anticipated moving at the same time, but construction delays and faults with the air-conditioning system meant that – although the building had been officially opened in February 2015 – the gallery did not open until 23 May, with inaugural exhibitions by Philip Trusttum and Tara Douglas.

In 2021 Ashburton Art Gallery became part of the Ashburton District Council, and merged with the Museum to create Ashburton Art Gallery and Heritage Centre. The Art Gallery curator and manager Shirin Khosraviani became the Director of the combined institution, and a Deputy Director position was created, to which Danielle Campbell was appointed.
