= Lake Clearwater =

Lake in the South Island of New Zealand

- Te Puna-a-Taka (Māori)
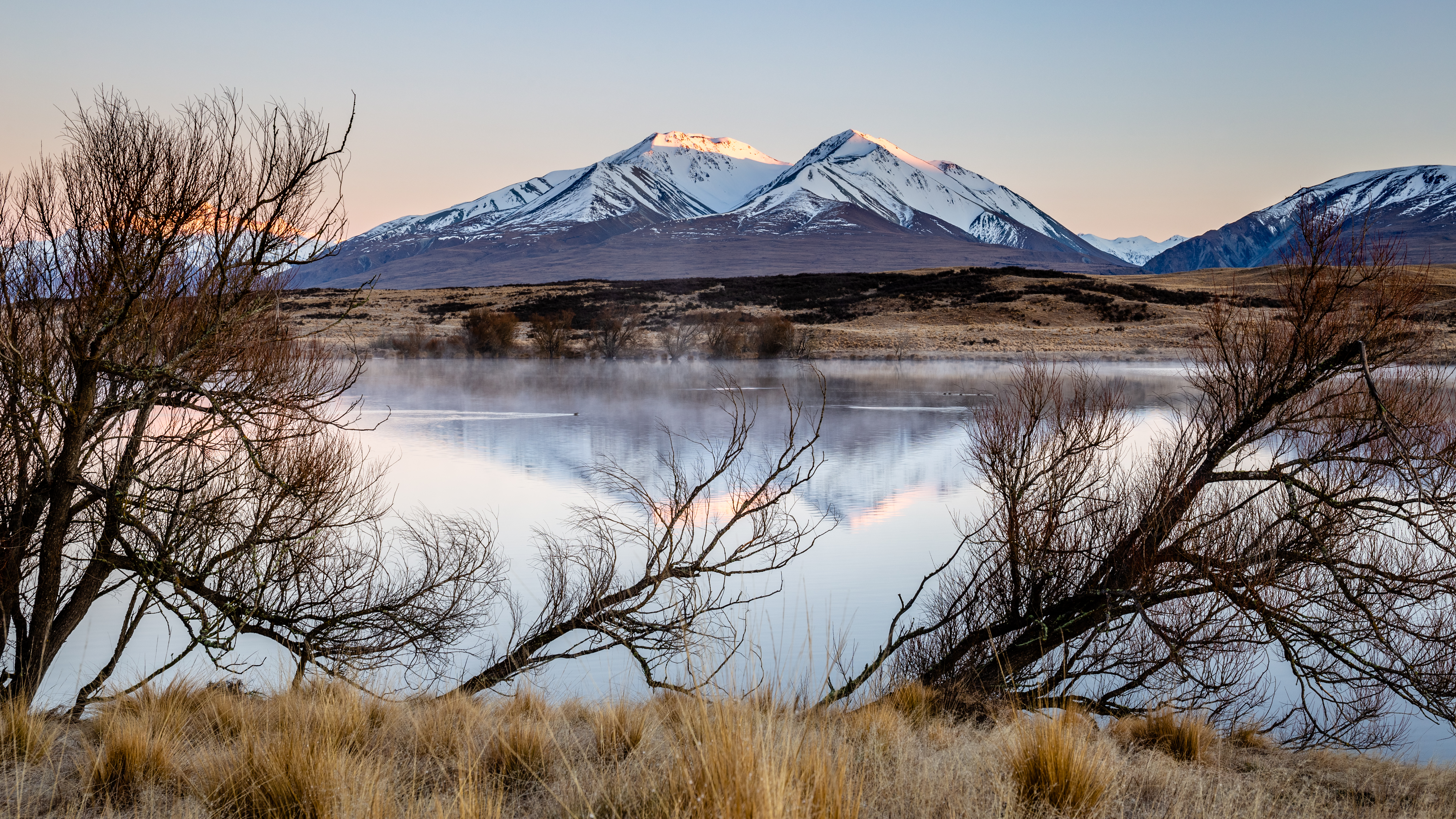
- Lake Clearwater sits in a wide tussock-covered mountain valley surrounded by high, generally snow-covered, mountain peaks at the headwaters of the Ashburton River.
- Interactive map of Lake Clearwater
- Location: Ashburton District, South Island
- Coordinates: 43.6033°S 171.0437°E
- Surface area: 197 ha (490 acres)
- Max. depth: 19 m (62 ft)
- Surface elevation: 667 m (2,188 ft)

Lake Clearwater (Māori: Te Puna-a-Taka) is a high country lake in the Ashburton District of the South Island of New Zealand. The lake is within the Ashburton Lakes district of rugged mountain country, tussocklands, beech forest, lakes and wetlands between the Rakaia and Rangitata Rivers. The surface area of Lake Clearwater is 197 ha (490 acres), and it has a surface elevation of 667 m (2,188 ft). The lake is in the catchment of the south branch of the Ashburton River / Hakatere. It is subjected to the strong prevailing northwesterly winds.

Lake Clearwater is a protected area, designated as a Government Purpose Reserve under section 22 of the Reserves Act 1977, and a wildlife refuge under section 14 of the Wildlife Act 1953. It is managed by the Department of Conservation.

The health of the lake is monitored using two parameters, the trophic level index and the Lake Submerged Plant Indicator. The trophic level index for the lake (a measure of nutrient status) has ranged between 3.1 and 5.3 over the period 2009 to 2023, ranking as "Poor". A case study report published by the Ministry for the Environment in 2023 reported that all the Ōtūwharekai / Ashburton Lakes were nutrient-enriched, with some at risk of deteriorating further into severe eutrophic states, changing from clear water with vegetation, to turbid algae-dominated water. The study reported that pastoral farming was the source for more than 90% of nutrients. Seepage of human waste at Lake Clearwater and Lake Camp was a contributor, but represented less than 10% of the nutrient inflow. The lake has a submerged plant indicator rating of 48 (moderate).

A small village of holiday homes, also called Lake Clearwater, is located between Lake Clearwater and the smaller neighbour Lake Camp. Road access to Lake Clearwater is approximately 38 km past Mount Somers and the last half is an unsealed gravel road. No dogs or motor powered craft are permitted on the lake as it is a wildlife reserve, however strong and consistent winds funnelled off the bounding mountains make it an ideal lake for windsurfing and kitesurfing. The adjacent, and smaller, Lake Camp is used by motor powered water craft.

The lake is a breeding site for the great crested grebe.
