= Swin River =

Coordinates: 43°29′S 171°11′E

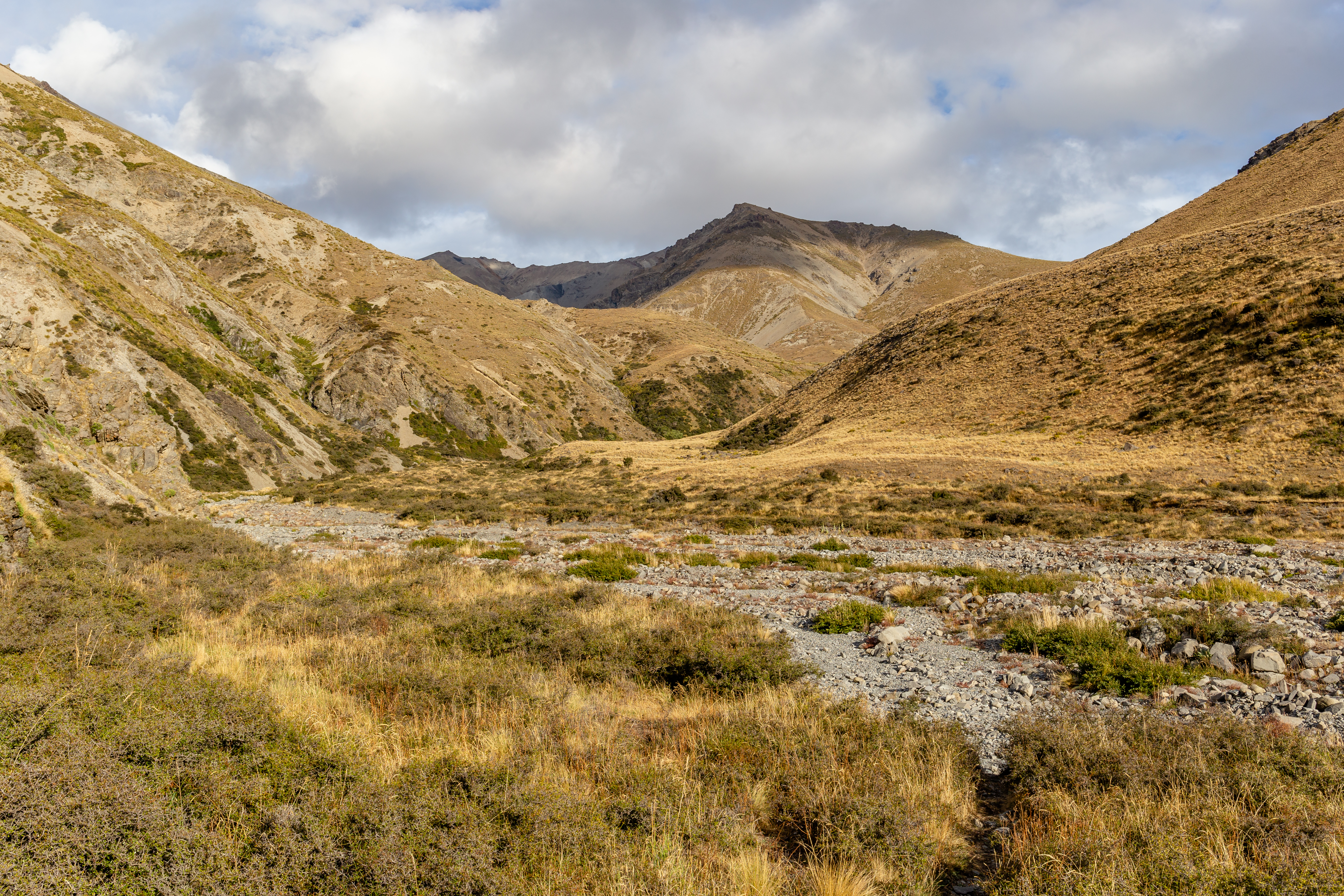

Location
- Country: New Zealand

Physical characteristics
- Source
  - location: Taylor Range
- Mouth
  - location: Lake Heron
- Length: 14 km (8.7 mi)

The Swin River is a river of the Canterbury region of New Zealand's South Island. It flows southwest from the Taylor Range to reach the southeastern shore of Lake Heron.

== See also ==
- List of rivers of New Zealand
