= Stewardship areas of New Zealand =

Stewardship land is a type of public conservation land in New Zealand that is stuck in a limbo state, after being transferred to the Department of Conservation (DOC) but not yet allocated a formal protection category.

Like other types of conservation land, stewardship land is administered by DOC under the Conservation Act 1987.

== Extent and Origin ==
As of November 2025, 30% of conservation land in New Zealand is classified as a stewardship area, which amounts to over 2.7 million hectares (6,700,000 acres) of land. This includes:

- land acquired by DOC via the now-abolished tenure review system
- former state forests, inherited by DOC when the New Zealand Forestry Service was disestablished
- land inherited by DOC when the Department of Lands and Survey was disestablished
- land purchased by the Crown via the Nature Heritage Fund.

== Disposal ==
Stewardship areas can be disposed of if they are deemed to have "low or no conservation value". This process was invoked in 2011, where 200 hectares (490 acres) of land was privatised for construction of a skifield.

There are ongoing proposals for the construction of skifields and coal mines on conservation land, which would require those stewardship areas to be disposed of and privatised.

== Timeline ==
In 2021, the Sixth Labour Government established a programme to reclassify stewardship areas, following a promise to ban new mines on conservation land.

In 2022, public consultation was held for the first tranche of land, on the West Coast of the South Island. A panel of experts recommended that 54% of West Coast stewardship land should be converted to conservation parks, 28% to historic reserves, 12% to national parks, and the remaining 6% to other classifications. Only 66 hectares (0.01%) was proposed to be disposed of.

As of 2025, there has been no further progress, following a change of government. Instead, there is renewed interest to allow mining on conservation land, and allow up to 60% of all conservation land to be delisted.
