= Ashburton Lakes =

Intermontane wetland area in New Zealand

Ashburton Lakes Ō Tū Wharekai (Māori)
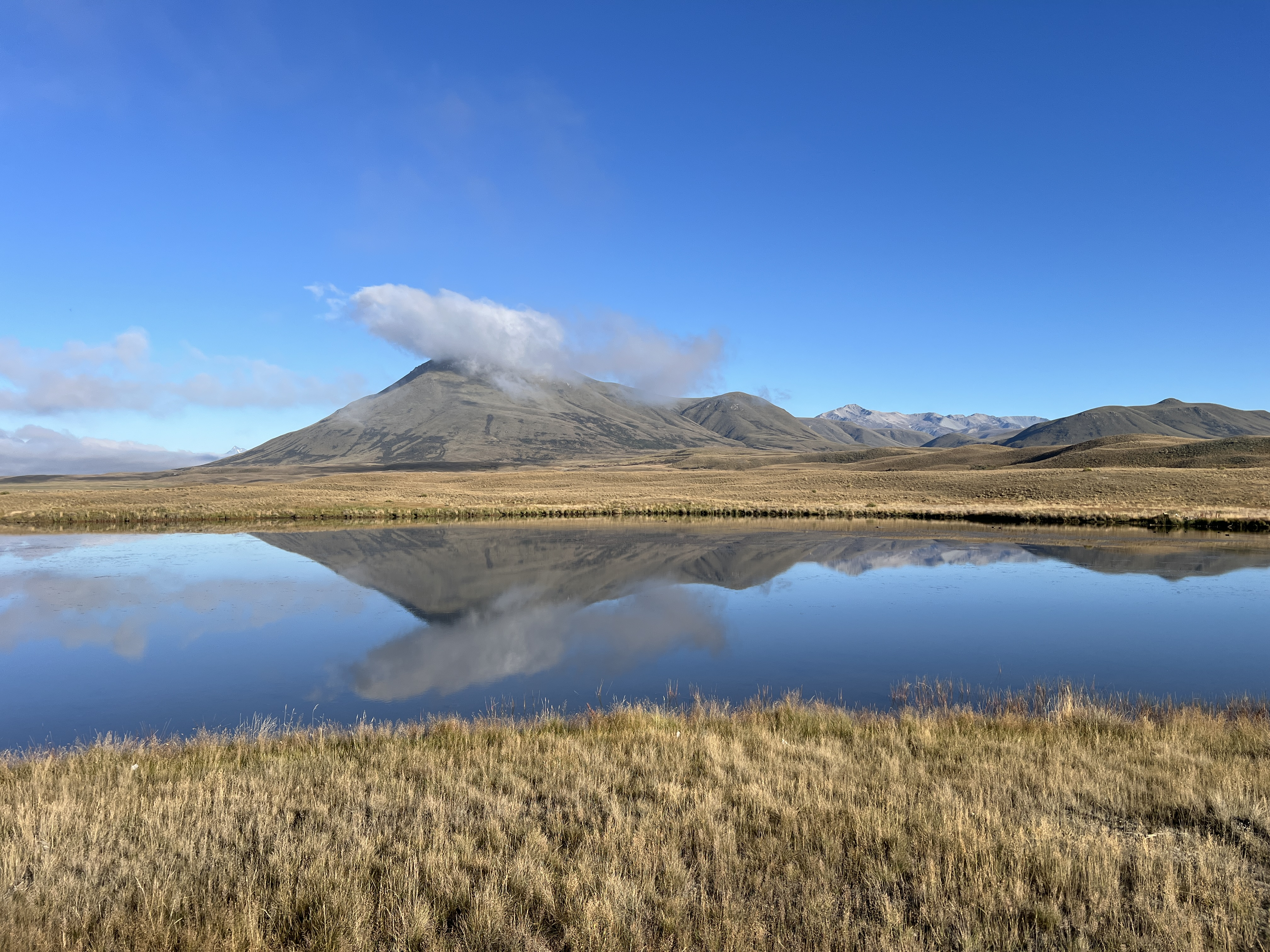
- Unnamed lake beside Hakatere Potts Road
- Interactive map of Ashburton Lakes
- Country: New Zealand
- Region: Canterbury

Ashburton Lakes (Māori: Ō Tū Wharekai) is a region of high-country lakes and wetlands located in inland Canterbury in the South Island of New Zealand. The region is a glacial inter-montane basin between the Rangitata and Rakaia rivers. It includes multiple areas of protected conservation land collectively known as the Hakatere Conservation Park, and the lakes, tarns and wetlands provide habitat for nationally significant and threatened species. The region includes 12 lakes, the largest of which are Lake Heron and Lake Clearwater. Both of these lakes are protected nature reserves.

The region provides recreational opportunities including camping, sight-seeing, tramping and climbing, skiing, fishing and hunting. Ōtūwharekai / Ashburton Lakes is an area of cultural importance to the iwi Ngāi Tahu because it was a significant food-gathering area and was also on a main route for travel between Hakatere and the Rakaia trails to Te Tai Poutini.

In 2007, the Ashburton Lakes were included in a national wetland restoration programme known as Arawai Kākāriki. Monitoring of water quality in the lakes shows they are in "fair" or "poor" condition, as a result of nutrient-enrichment and sediment inflow. As of 2024, several of the lakes are at risk of deteriorating further into severe eutrophic states, changing from clear water with vegetation, to turbid algae-dominated water.

== Toponymy ==
The Māori name Ō Tū Wharekai is used for the entire Ashburton Lakes district, but also as the name of two small interconnected wetlands that are commonly known as the Māori Lakes. The name builds on the Māori word wharekai, meaning dining or banquet hall, and signifies the importance of the area for food-gathering.

== Significance to Ngāi Tahu ==
The settlement between the Crown and the rūnanga Ngāi Tahu for historic breaches of the Treaty of Waitangi included a Deed of Recognition in relation to the Ōtūwharekai / Ashburton Lakes. The 1998 deed acknowledges the traditional association of Ngāi Tahu with the Ōtūwharekai / Ashburton Lakes, including historical, cultural and spiritual aspects. The deed requires that the Crown consult with Ngāi Tahu about changes to the management of wetland areas. Ōtūwharekai/Ashburton Lakes is an area of cultural importance to the iwi Ngāi Tahu because it was a significant food–gathering area and was also on a main route for travel between Hakatere and the Rakaia trails to Te Tai Poutini (the West Coast Region).

== Geography ==
The Ashburton Lakes are located in a glacial inter-montane basin between the Rangitata and Rakaia rivers that drains the eastern slopes of the Southern Alps. In the late Pleistocene, a combined glacier including a lobe of the Rakaia glacier, merged with the Cameron glacier and the Rangitata glacier system and reached all the way through the Ashburton Gorge to the Canterbury Plains. Glaciation has profoundly affected the landscape, and there is evidence in the landforms of multiple glacier advances. The last advance reached its maximum extent 28,000 years ago in the Ashburton Lakes area, and by 15,000 years ago the glaciers had retreated to the valleys of the upper Clyde and Havelock Rivers.

The lakes in the Ōtūwharekai/Ashburton district include Lake Camp, Lake Clearwater, Lake Emily, Lake Emma, Lake Heron, Māori Lakes, Lake Roundabout, Mystery Lake, and the Spider Lakes along with many unnamed small tarns.

=== Human influence on the landscape ===
Long term trends and changes in the flora in the Ashburton Lakes region can be inferred from analysis of pollen, charcoal and algae in sediment cores taken from the lakes. The analysis of sediment cores indicates that prior to the arrival of humans in the Ashburton Lakes region, there were native podocarp forests, including mataī (Prumnopitys taxifolia) and smaller trees such as celery pine (Phyllocladus sp.) around the lakes. Following human arrival, the sediment cores show a marked increase in charcoal, from large–scale burning of the vegetation. There is an increase in bracken fern, an early colonising plant, that is indicative of disturbance. Following the arrival of European pastoral farmers, there was further burning of the landscape, with the result that trees were essentially removed, and replaced with a tussock and grass landscape. While algae have always been present in the lakes, the sediment cores show that algae has increased significantly since the arrival of humans.

The burning of tussock lands to produce young growth to feed stock has led to tall native tussocks being replaced with shorter species, and matagouri and Aciphylla species are less common. Topdressing and oversowing has changed the vegetation, particularly at lower elevations. Other changes are the spread of introduced and pest plants such as broom, gorse and wilding pines.

Over the period 1990 to 2010, pastoral farming in the high country stations around the lakes has become intensified, with larger herds of cattle, more fertiliser use, and winter forage grazing. The vegetation in the stations has changed from tussock and indigenous shrubs to pasture grasses. This has resulted in elevated levels of phosphorus and nitrogen being discharged, increasing the levels of nutrients and sediments in the lakes.

=== Biodiversity ===
The glacial landforms, lakes and wetlands support diverse habitats and are designated in the Ashburton District Plan as Areas of Significant Nature Conservation Value. The basin has examples of kettleholes that provide habitat for rare ephemeral turf vegetation. The lakes, tarns and wetlands provide habitat for nationally significant and threatened species.

Environment Canterbury (ECan) has described Ōtūwharekai Lakes as "one of the few remaining areas of native biodiversity in mid-Canterbury".

One critically endangered species found in the area in 2024 is the Canterbury knobbled weevil.

== Demographics ==
Ashburton Lakes statistical area covers 2,995.14 km^{2} (1,156.43 sq mi) and had an estimated population of 110 as of June 2025, with a population density of 0.037 people per km^{2}.

Historical population
Year	Pop.	±% p.a.
2006	90	—
2013	102	+1.80%
2018	96	−1.21%
2023	99	+0.62%

Ashburton Lakes had a population of 99 in the 2023 New Zealand census, an increase of 3 people (3.1%) since the 2018 census, and a decrease of 3 people (−2.9%) since the 2013 census. There were 54 males and 45 females in 54 dwellings. The median age was 31.5 years (compared with 38.1 years nationally). There were 18 people (18.2%) aged under 15 years, 27 (27.3%) aged 15 to 29, 48 (48.5%) aged 30 to 64, and 6 (6.1%) aged 65 or older.

People could identify as more than one ethnicity. The results were 93.9% European (Pākehā), 6.1% Māori, 3.0% Pasifika, and 12.1% other, which includes people giving their ethnicity as "New Zealander". English was spoken by 93.9%, and other languages by 6.1%. No language could be spoken by 6.1% (e.g. too young to talk). The percentage of people born overseas was 6.1, compared with 28.8% nationally.

The sole religious affiliation given was 21.2% Christian. People who answered that they had no religion were 78.8%, and 3.0% of people did not answer the census question.

Of those at least 15 years old, 18 (22.2%) people had a bachelor's or higher degree, 54 (66.7%) had a post-high school certificate or diploma, and 9 (11.1%) people exclusively held high school qualifications. The median income was $55,800, compared with $41,500 nationally. 12 people (14.8%) earned over $100,000 compared to 12.1% nationally. The employment status of those at least 15 was 60 (74.1%) full-time and 12 (14.8%) part-time.

== Hakatere Conservation Park ==
Hakatere Conservation Park is a protected area of high country in the Ashburton Lakes district between the Rangitata and Rakaia rivers. The park was established in 2007 and covers 680 km^{2} (260 sq mi) of rugged mountains and mountain basins, tussocklands and beech forest, and includes alpine and sub-alpine ecosystems, braided rivers, lakes and wetlands. The park is a collection of discrete areas of protected conservation land, and lies within the wider Ashburton Lakes region. The Hakatere Conservation Park is administered by the Department of Conservation.

== Recreation and tourism ==
Recreational activities within the Ashburton Lakes district include camping, sight-seeing and photography, tramping and climbing, skiing, fishing, hunting, bird-watching, horse riding and mountain biking. The lakes provide opportunities for non-motorised boating, with power boats allowed only on Lake Camp. There are many places suitable for camping and picnics. The Lake Clearwater village has around 180 private holiday home dwellings (known as cribs or baches). Some high-country stations in the region have established tourism ventures or accommodation on their properties.

== Deteriorating water quality ==
=== Ō Tū Wharekai wetland restoration project ===
Ōtūwharekai/Ashburton Lakes has been described by the Department of Conservation as "one of the best examples of an unspoiled, intact, inter-montane wetland system remaining in New Zealand". However, the environment is at risk from water abstraction and degradation of water quality caused by nutrient inputs and sediment resulting from intensified pastoral farming practices.

A project focused on restoration of the Ō Tū Wharekai lakes was established as part of a national programme known as Arawai Kākāriki. The programme was launched in 2007 aiming for the restoration of three (subsequently five) significant wetlands.

=== 2023 case study report ===
A case study report published by the Ministry for the Environment in 2023 reported that all the Ashburton Lakes were nutrient-enriched, with some at risk of deteriorating further into severe eutrophic states, changing from clear water with vegetation, to turbid algae-dominated water. None of the lakes met minimum objectives for water quality in the Land and Water Regional Plan (LWRP). The study reported that pastoral farming was the source for more than 90% of nutrients. Seepage of human waste at Lake Clearwater and Lake Camp was a contributor, but represented less than 10% of the nutrient inflow. The report found that "no systems were in place that allowed a timely response" to the decline in water quality, that the freshwater management system had failed to protect the lakes, and that too many key decisions about environmental management were delegated to farmers and their consultants.

=== Reactions ===
A former Chair of Fish & Game New Zealand stated that the health of several of the Ashburton Lakes is at serious risk and that recovery from highly eutrophic states will be costly and difficult. He urged ECan, the Regional Council, to take immediate action to halt the decline in water quality. He noted that the four high country stations in the area of the Ashburton Lakes — Lake Heron, Mt Arrowsmith, Mt Possession and Castle Ridge — had done what they believed they were allowed to do under the current ECan rules, but those rules had failed to protect the lakes. The Environmental Defence Society called on ECan to review the Ōtūwharekai consents. A researcher from the Department of Public Health, University of Otago, criticised ECan, recommending that intensive winter grazing should be prohibited in the catchments, and that specific plans are required for each lake, with trigger points for action.

Te Rūnanga o Ngāi Tahu were strongly critical of the inadequate response to earlier warnings about declining water quality and the lack of the engagement that had been promised to Ngāi Tahu as part of the 1998 Deed of Recognition.

In 2025, owners of the main farms in the catchment areas for the Ashburton Lakes reported on studies that they had conducted, showing that the levels of nitrate in waterways on their properties typically did not increase as it passed downstream towards the lakes. They claimed that the focus on farmers for causing the nutrient-enrichment of the lakes was unfair.

=== Local catchment group ===
In 2024, the Sixth National Government announced funding for locally-led catchment groups across New Zealand, including $950,000 to the Ōtūwharekai / Ashburton Lakes Catchment Group, together with the Mid Canterbury Catchment Collective.

== See also ==
- Wetlands of New Zealand
