= Nature Heritage Fund =

The Nature Heritage Fund is a funding body of the New Zealand Government set up in 1990 for the purchase of land which has significant ecological or landscape value.

It is administered by the Department of Conservation, but controlled by the Minister of Conservation. It was initially called the Forest Heritage Fund, but the name was changed in 1998 to reflect the need to protect ecosystems other than forests, for example wetlands, tussocklands and shrublands. Funding has declined sharply: while $10m per annum was allocated in the early 2000s, this has reduced to $2m per year in 2016.

In its first 25 years, the fund purchased and protected 341,881 hectares (844,810 acres) of land, representing 1.3% of New Zealand's land area. The fund was chaired by Di Lucas, a landscape architect from Christchurch, from its inception until 2017.

In its 2025 budget, the Sixth National Government announced the closure of the Nature Heritage Fund, despite increasing revenue from the international visitor levy for the Department of Conservation.
