= Lake Camp =

Lake in the South Island of New Zealand

- Ōtuatari (Māori)
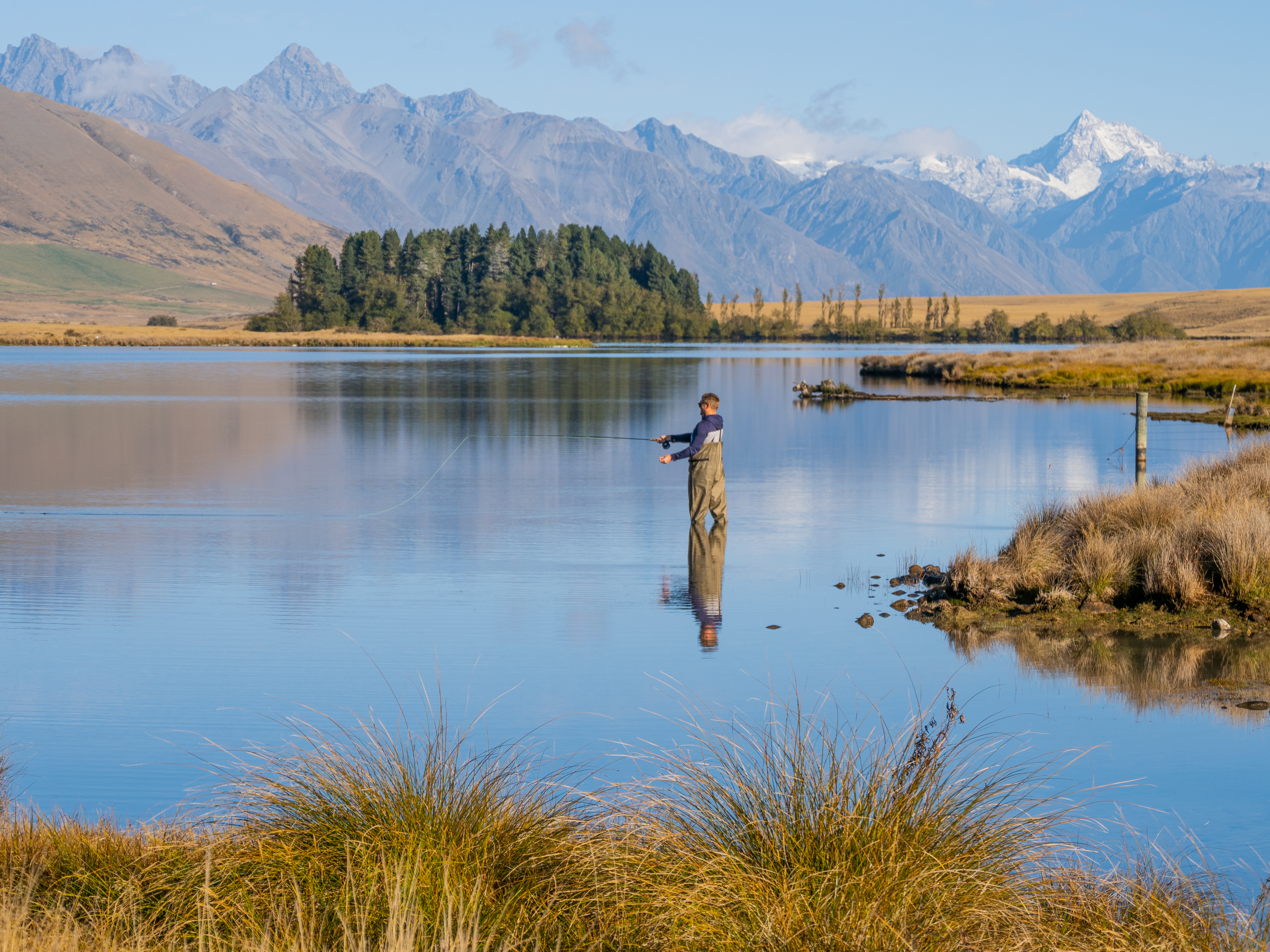
- Lake Camp
- Interactive map of Lake Camp
- Location: Ashburton District, Canterbury region, South Island
- Coordinates: 43°36′54″S 171°3′25″E
- Surface area: 43.8 ha (108 acres)
- Max. depth: 13 m (43 ft)
- Surface elevation: 680 m (2,230 ft)

Lake Camp (Māori: Ōtuatari) is located in inland Canterbury in the South Island of New Zealand. The lake has a surface area of 43.8 ha (108 acres), and is 30 km (19 mi) northwest of the small settlement of Mount Somers. The lake lies immediately to the south of the Hakatere Potts Road.

Lake Camp and the nearby Lake Clearwater (Te Puna a Taka) are part of the Ashburton Lakes (Ōtūwharekai), an area of cultural importance to the iwi Ngāi Tahu because they were a significant food-gathering area and also on a main route for travel between the east and west coasts of the South Island (Te Waipounamu).

Lake Camp is designated as a recreation reserve, and is owned by the Department of Conservation. However, the lake and the adjoining Lake Clearwater village are administered by the Ashburton District Council. The lake is popular for recreation in summer, including swimming and water skiing. In 2024, the community raised concerns about the low level of the lake, and advocated for the re-instatement of a former diversion of the Balmacaan Stream to add inflows to the lake to improve the recreational potential. The diversion had been in place for 50 years, but a resource consent for the diversion expired in 2020. The Ashburton District Council decided not to seek a new resource consent, because of the high costs and uncertain outcome.

Camping around the lake is permitted only on the eastern and northern sides of the lake. Recreational vehicles such as 4WD and ATV are not permitted along the southern boundary, and dogs are prohibited anywhere around the lake or in the Lake Clearwater village.

During summer periods, the water quality in the lake is monitored against standards for recreational use. The trophic level index for the lake (a measure of nutrient status) has generally ranged between 3 and 4 over the period 2009 to 2023, ranking as "Fair". A case study report published by the Ministry for the Environment in 2023 reported that all the Ōtūwharekai / Ashburton Lakes were nutrient-enriched, with some at risk of deteriorating further into severe eutrophic states, changing from clear water with vegetation, to turbid algae-dominated water. The study reported that pastoral farming was the source for more than 90% of nutrients. Seepage of human waste at Lake Clearwater and Lake Camp was a contributor, but represented less than 10% of the nutrient inflow.
