= High country (New Zealand) =

New Zealand term for the country's elevated pastoral land

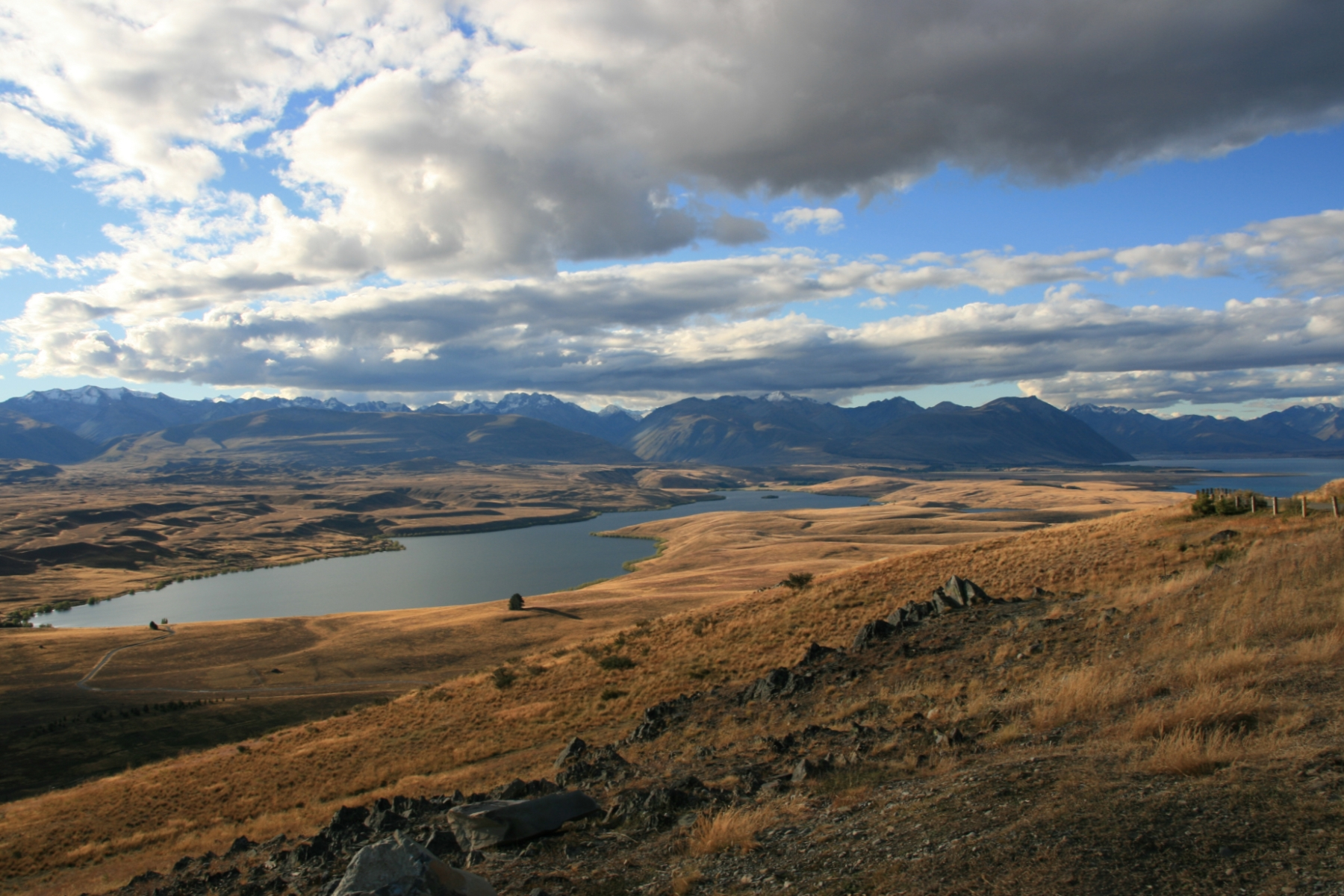
High country scenery: Looking across Lakes Alexandrina and Tekapo in the northern Mackenzie Basin.

In New Zealand, high country is a term for the elevated pastoral land of the South Island and – to a lesser extent – North Island. This terrain, which can be compared loosely with the outback of Australia, high veldt of South Africa and pampas of Argentina, lies in the rain shadow of the country's mountain ranges and tends to be extensively farmed land with a continental climate consisting of low rainfall, cold winters and hot summers. Livestock farmed in these regions include sheep and – increasingly – deer and alpaca, and a major ground-covering plant of the area is tussock.

Regions of New Zealand closely associated with the high country include Central Otago and the Mackenzie Basin in the South Island, and parts of the North Island Volcanic Plateau. Much of the land is at a high altitude (hence its name), with the majority of the high country being more than 600 metres (2000 feet) above sea level. The land is marked with geological features associated with glaciation from the last ice age, with deep finger-shaped lakes such as Lake Wānaka and Lake Tekapo.

== In popular culture ==
The South Island's high country was featured extensively in the Lord of the Rings film trilogy, where it stood in for Gondor and Rohan.
