= Ashburton District =

- Territorial authority district
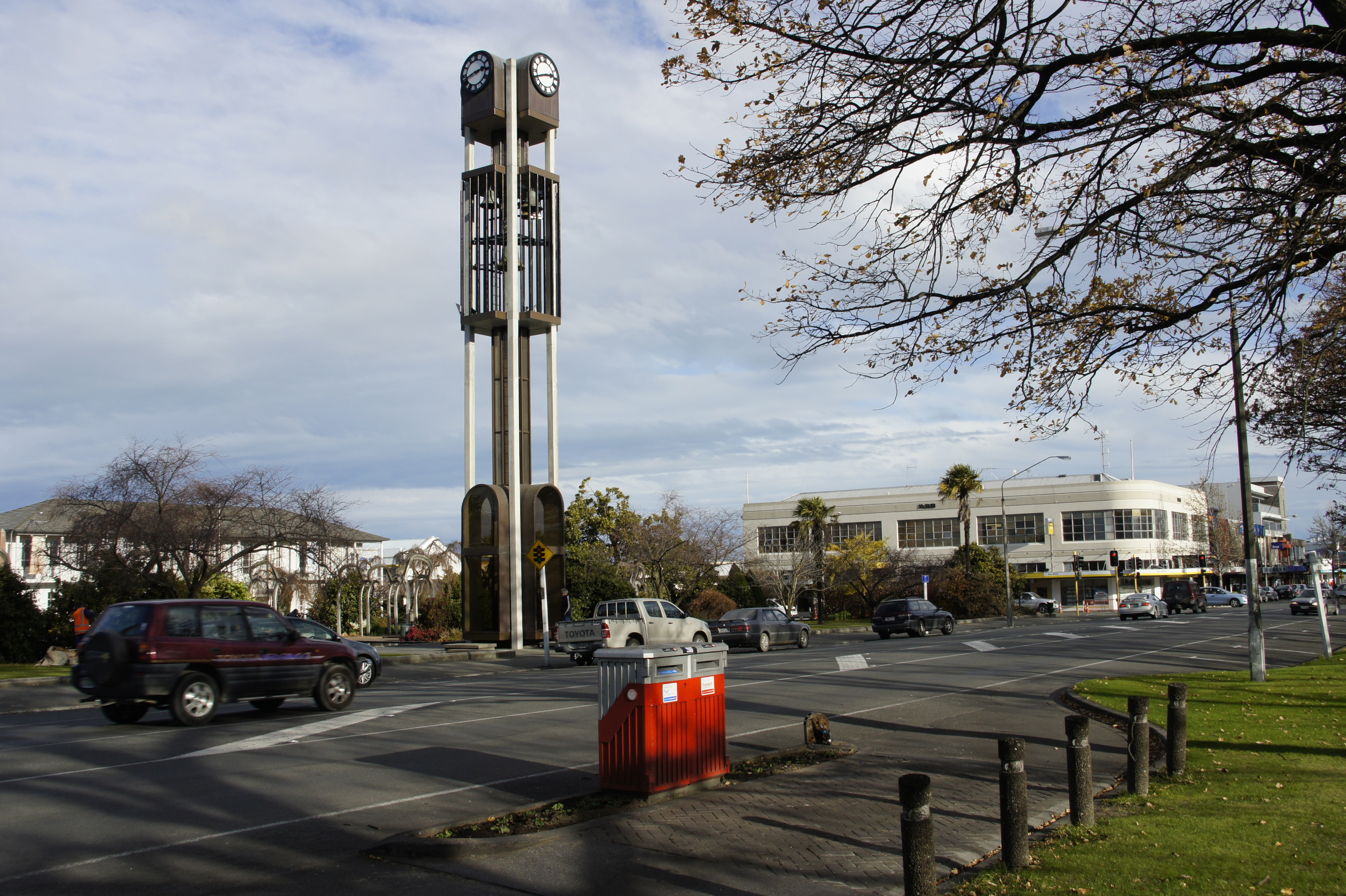

- Coat of arms

- Ashburton district in the South Island
- Coordinates: 43°34′48″S 171°20′53″E
- Country: New Zealand
- Region: Canterbury
- Wards: Western; Eastern; Ashburton
- Formed: 1989
- Seat: Ashburton

Government
  - Mayor: Liz McMillan
  - Territorial authority: Ashburton District Council

Area
  - Total: 6,181.45 km^{2} (2,386.67 sq mi)

Population (June 2025)
  - Total: 37,400
  - Density: 6.05/km^{2} (15.7/sq mi)
- Time zone: UTC+12 (NZST)
  - Summer (DST): UTC+13 (NZDT)
- Postcode(s): Map of postcodes
- Website: www.ashburtondc.govt.nz

Ashburton District is a territorial authority district in the Canterbury Region of the South Island of New Zealand. It encompasses the town of Ashburton, a number of small towns and settlements and the surrounding rural area, roughly coterminous with Mid Canterbury. The district had a population of 37,400 as of June 2025.

== Geography ==
Ashburton District extends from the Pacific Ocean to the Southern Alps, and from the Rangitata River to the Rakaia River, including the towns of Methven, Mount Somers, and Rakaia. The Hakatere Conservation Park covers a large area of the lower mountains, including Mount Hutt skifield, popular tramping area Mount Somers / Te Kiekie and the Ashburton Lakes.

== Demographics ==
Ashburton District covers 6,181.45 km^{2} (2,386.67 sq mi) and had an estimated population of 37,400 as of June 2025, with a population density of 6.1 people per km^{2}.

Historical population
Year	Pop.	±% p.a.
2006	27,372	—
2013	31,041	+1.81%
2018	33,423	+1.49%
2023	34,746	+0.78%

Ashburton District had a population of 34,746 in the 2023 New Zealand census, an increase of 1,323 people (4.0%) since the 2018 census, and an increase of 3,705 people (11.9%) since the 2013 census. There were 17,544 males, 17,118 females and 84 people of other genders in 13,833 dwellings. 2.2% of people identified as LGBTIQ+. The median age was 40.1 years (compared with 38.1 years nationally). There were 6,714 people (19.3%) aged under 15 years, 5,724 (16.5%) aged 15 to 29, 15,447 (44.5%) aged 30 to 64, and 6,864 (19.8%) aged 65 or older.

People could identify as more than one ethnicity. The results were 81.1% European (Pākehā); 8.6% Māori; 6.0% Pasifika; 9.4% Asian; 1.4% Middle Eastern, Latin American and African New Zealanders (MELAA); and 2.6% other, which includes people giving their ethnicity as "New Zealander". English was spoken by 97.0%, Māori language by 1.4%, Samoan by 1.5% and other languages by 10.1%. No language could be spoken by 2.0% (e.g. too young to talk). New Zealand Sign Language was known by 0.4%. The percentage of people born overseas was 20.6, compared with 28.8% nationally.

Religious affiliations were 39.2% Christian, 1.1% Hindu, 0.6% Islam, 0.3% Māori religious beliefs, 0.6% Buddhist, 0.3% New Age, and 1.1% other religions. People who answered that they had no religion were 49.5%, and 7.4% of people did not answer the census question.

Of those at least 15 years old, 3,243 (11.6%) people had a bachelor's or higher degree, 15,759 (56.2%) had a post-high school certificate or diploma, and 8,118 (29.0%) people exclusively held high school qualifications. The median income was $42,800, compared with $41,500 nationally. 2,313 people (8.3%) earned over $100,000 compared to 12.1% nationally. The employment status of those at least 15 was that 14,793 (52.8%) people were employed full-time, 4,167 (14.9%) were part-time, and 507 (1.8%) were unemployed.

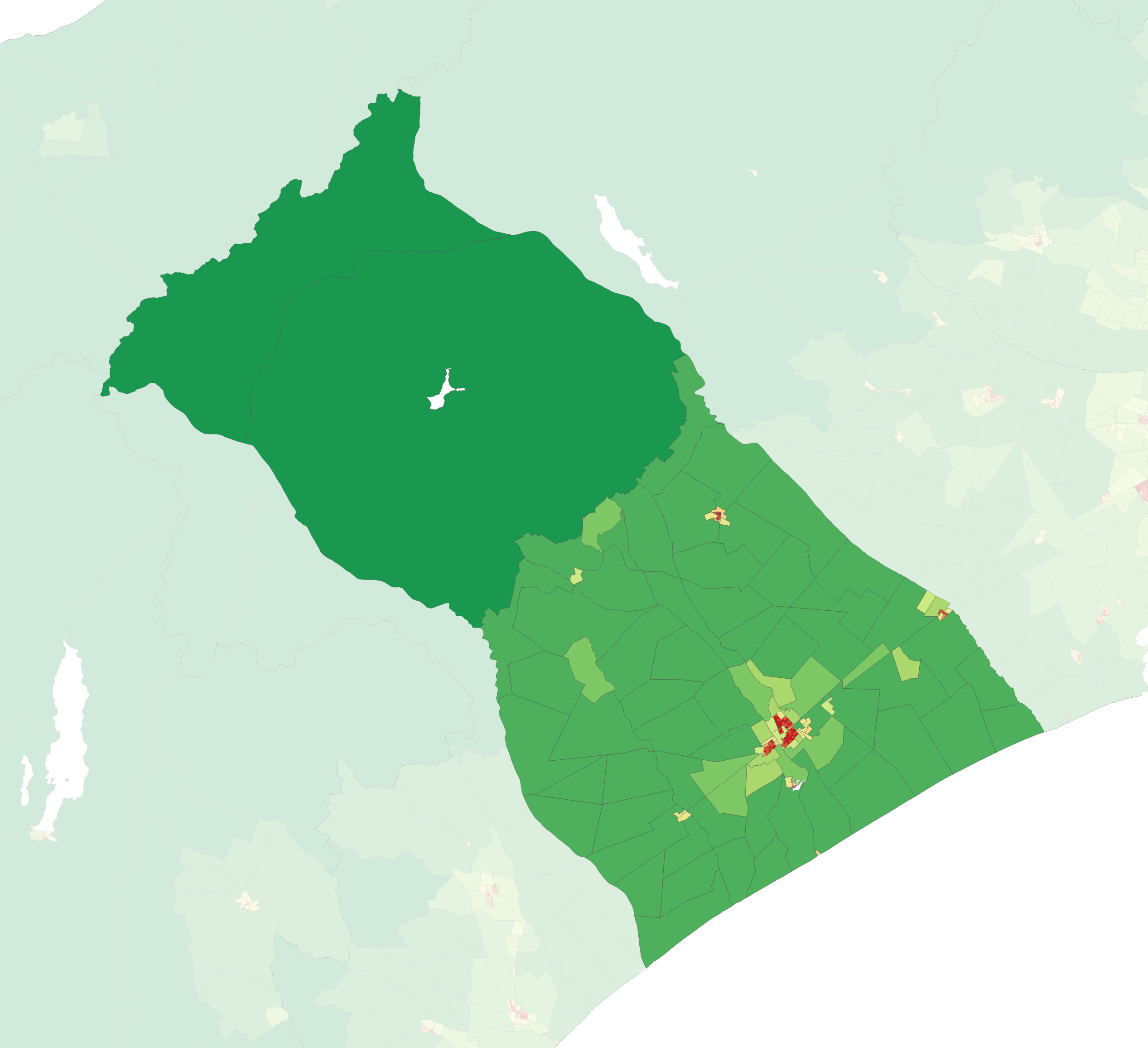
Population density in the 2023 census

Individual wards
Name	Area (km^{2})	Population	Density (per km^{2})	Dwellings	Median age	Median income
Western Ward	4,745.23	7,122	1.5	2,895	36.4 years	$52,300
Eastern Ward	1,385.88	6,918	5.0	2,682	37.9 years	$48,500
Ashburton Ward	50.34	20,706	411.3	8,259	43.2 years	$38,300
New Zealand					38.1 years	$41,500

== Government ==
Ashburton District Council administers the district. The council consists of a mayor and nine councillors. The councillors are elected from three wards: five from the Ashburton ward, and two each from the Eastern and Western wards.

== Economy ==
The Ashburton District has a modelled gross domestic product (GDP) of $2,823 million in the year to March 2024, 0.7% of New Zealand's national GDP. The GDP per capita is $76,338, ranking 16th-highest out of 66 territorial authorities.
