= Lake Rotoroa (Northland) =

Lake in the North Island of New Zealand

- Location within New Zealand
- Location: Northland Region, North Island
- Coordinates: 35.0575°S 173.1998°E
- Type: dune lake
- Catchment area: 97 hectares (240 acres)
- Basin countries: New Zealand
- Surface area: 34.9 hectares (86 acres)
- Max. depth: 7.3 metres (24 ft)
- Residence time: 14 months

Lake Rotoroa is a dune lake in the Northland Region of New Zealand. It is located to the west of Awanui.

Lake Rotoroa is one of the larger lakes of the Sweetwater group of lakes. The lake has no defined inflows or outflows.

The lake catchment is predominantly pastoral. The lake is completely fenced, and with development of riparian vegetation this may reduce nutrient inputs from the catchment, particularly on formally grazed lake margins.

The Bushland Trust, working with the Department of Conservation and Northland Regional Council is undertaking restoration at Lake Rotoroa, as well as other nearby dune lakes, such as Lake Heather, Lake Rotokawau, Lake Ngatu, Lake Gem, and Lake Ngakapua.

The water quality of the lake is monitored by Northland Regional Council.

== Etymology ==
In Māori, rotoroa means "long lake" (roto = lake, roa = long).

== See also ==
- List of lakes in New Zealand
