= Lake Heather =

- Location within Northland Region
- Location: Northland Region, North Island
- Coordinates: 35.0509°S 173.1937°E
- Type: Class 1 Perched dune lake
- Catchment area: 108.4 hectares (268 acres)
- Basin countries: New Zealand
- Surface area: 12.5 hectares (31 acres)
- Max. depth: 6.8 metres (22 ft)

Lake Heather (Wai Te Huahua) is a dune lake in the Far North District of New Zealand. It is located west of the town of Awanui, and between the larger Lake Ngatu and Lake Rotoroa.

Lake Heather has no inflow or outflow streams. The lake catchment is primarily pasture, with scrub along the eastern border. The margins are fenced and have recently had native planting.

== Water quality and ecology ==
The lake is monitored by Northland Regional Council, and the environmental information can be viewed on the LAWA website. The Bushland Trust, working with the Department of Conservation and Northland Regional Council, is undertaking restoration at Lake Rotoroa, as well as other nearby dune lakes, such as Lake Rotoroa, Lake Rotokawau, Lake Ngatu, Lake Gem, and Lake Ngakapua.
