= Kaimaumau =

- Interactive map of Kaimaumau
- Coordinates: 34.921°S 173.266°E
- Country: New Zealand
- Region: Northland Region
- District: Far North District
- Ward: Te Hiku
- Community: Te Hiku
- Subdivision: North Cape
- Electorates: Northland; Te Tai Tokerau

Government
  - Territorial Authority: Far North District Council
  - Regional council: Northland Regional Council
  - Mayor of Far North: Moko Tepania
  - Northland MP: Grant McCallum
  - Te Tai Tokerau MP: Mariameno Kapa-Kingi

Area
  - Total: 37.09 km^{2} (14.32 sq mi)

Population (June 2025)
  - Total: 200
  - Density: 5.4/km^{2} (14/sq mi)

Kaimaumau is a locality on the northwest side of Rangaunu Harbour and on east side of the Aupōuri Peninsula of Northland, New Zealand.

In October 2020, the Government committed $65,643 from the Provincial Growth Fund to upgrade Kaimaumau Marae, creating 23 jobs.

A scrub fire in the Kaimaumau wetland north of the town began on 18 December 2021 and continued to burn over a 2,800 hectare area until early February, forcing the evacuation of Kaimaumau twice. Firefighting cost over $7 million. The fire was accidental, and may have continued to burn underground in peat after being extinguished above ground. The fire caused over 600,000 tonnes of carbon to be released into the atmosphere. A large fire also affected the peat land in 1988.

== History ==
Kaimaumau was an important location for the late 19th and early 20th century kauri gum digging trade. In the 1910s, the lower quality chip gum found at the southern half of the Aupouri Peninsula greatly increased in value.

== Demographics ==
Statistics New Zealand describes Kaimaumau as a rural settlement. It covers 37.09 km^{2} (14.32 sq mi) and had an estimated population of 200 as of June 2025, with a population density of 5.4 people per km^{2}. Kaimaumau is part of the larger Rangaunu Harbour statistical area.

Historical population
Year	Pop.	±% p.a.
2006	144	—
2013	135	−0.92%
2018	153	+2.53%
2023	204	+5.92%

Kaimaumau had a population of 204 in the 2023 New Zealand census, an increase of 51 people (33.3%) since the 2018 census, and an increase of 69 people (51.1%) since the 2013 census. There were 105 males, and 96 females in 81 dwellings. 2.9% of people identified as LGBTIQ+. The median age was 49.2 years (compared with 38.1 years nationally). There were 36 people (17.6%) aged under 15 years, 30 (14.7%) aged 15 to 29, 90 (44.1%) aged 30 to 64, and 45 (22.1%) aged 65 or older.

People could identify as more than one ethnicity. The results were 64.7% European (Pākehā), 52.9% Māori, 1.5% Pasifika, 1.5% Asian, and 2.9% other, which includes people giving their ethnicity as "New Zealander". English was spoken by 97.1%, Māori language by 8.8%, and other languages by 2.9%. No language could be spoken by 1.5% (e.g. too young to talk). The percentage of people born overseas was 4.4, compared with 28.8% nationally.

Religious affiliations were 27.9% Christian, 16.2% Māori religious beliefs, and 1.5% other religions. People who answered that they had no religion were 44.1%, and 7.4% of people did not answer the census question.

Of those at least 15 years old, 6 (3.6%) people had a bachelor's or higher degree, 111 (66.1%) had a post-high school certificate or diploma, and 42 (25.0%) people exclusively held high school qualifications. The median income was $26,200, compared with $41,500 nationally. 6 people (3.6%) earned over $100,000 compared to 12.1% nationally. The employment status of those at least 15 was that 63 (37.5%) people were employed full-time, 24 (14.3%) were part-time, and 9 (5.4%) were unemployed.
