= Unahi =

Locality in Northland New Zealand

- Interactive map of Unahi
- Coordinates: 35.002°S 173.250°E
- Country: New Zealand
- Region: Northland Region
- District: Far North District
- Ward: Te Hiku
- Community: Te Hiku
- Subdivision: Whatuwhiwhi
- Electorates: Northland; Te Tai Tokerau

Government
  - Territorial Authority: Far North District Council
  - Regional council: Northland Regional Council
  - Mayor of Far North: Moko Tepania
  - Northland MP: Grant McCallum
  - Te Tai Tokerau MP: Mariameno Kapa-Kingi

Area
  - Total: 11.41 km^{2} (4.41 sq mi)

Population (2023 census)
  - Total: 183
  - Density: 16.0/km^{2} (41.5/sq mi)

Unahi is a small settlement in the Far North District of New Zealand. It is located on the southern shore of Rangaunu Harbour between the mouths of Awanui River and Waipapakauri Creek, on the isthmus of the Aupōuri Peninsula. The larger settlement of Awanui lies to the south. Unahi is about 13 kilometres to the north of Kaitaia, the nearest town.

The name means "to scale fish".

== History ==
The Walker family has been important to Unahi since the early 20th century, with a fish factory flourishing in 1906 and with four family members over three generations filling the role of harbour warden. Lily Elsie Walker, who ran the local Ship to Shore radio, received the Queen's Service Medal for community service in 1978.

Unahi was a port for Awanui from 1926. It provided an alternative allowing ships to avoid the winding Awanui River to reach Awanui itself. The old wharf was replaced by a new one in 2022, now primarily for recreational use. A new carpark for the wharf was opened in 2024. The carpark includes seats and a welcome sign using timber from the old wharf. Artworks and a history panel are displayed in the carpark.

== Demographics ==
The SA1 statistical area which includes Unahi covers 11.41 km^{2} (4.41 sq mi). The SA1 area is part of the larger Rangaunu Harbour statistical area.

Historical population
Year	Pop.	±% p.a.
2013	144	—
2018	177	+4.21%
2023	183	+0.67%

The SA1 statistical area had a population of 183 in the 2023 New Zealand census, an increase of 6 people (3.4%) since the 2018 census, and an increase of 39 people (27.1%) since the 2013 census. There were 93 males, and 87 females in 63 dwellings. 1.6% of people identified as LGBTIQ+. The median age was 36.2 years (compared with 38.1 years nationally). There were 36 people (19.7%) aged under 15 years, 39 (21.3%) aged 15 to 29, 81 (44.3%) aged 30 to 64, and 27 (14.8%) aged 65 or older.

People could identify as more than one ethnicity. The results were 63.9% European (Pākehā), 62.3% Māori, 4.9% Pasifika, and 1.6% Asian. English was spoken by 96.7%, Māori language by 26.2%, and other languages by 4.9%. No language could be spoken by 1.6% (e.g. too young to talk). New Zealand Sign Language was known by 1.6%. The percentage of people born overseas was 8.2, compared with 28.8% nationally.

Religious affiliations were 29.5% Christian, 3.3% Māori religious beliefs, 1.6% New Age, and 3.3% other religions. People who answered that they had no religion were 47.5%, and 16.4% of people did not answer the census question.

Of those at least 15 years old, 12 (8.2%) people had a bachelor's or higher degree, 99 (67.3%) had a post-high school certificate or diploma, and 39 (26.5%) people exclusively held high school qualifications. The median income was $29,800, compared with $41,500 nationally. 6 people (4.1%) earned over $100,000 compared to 12.1% nationally. The employment status of those at least 15 was that 69 (46.9%) people were employed full-time, 21 (14.3%) were part-time, and 6 (4.1%) were unemployed.
