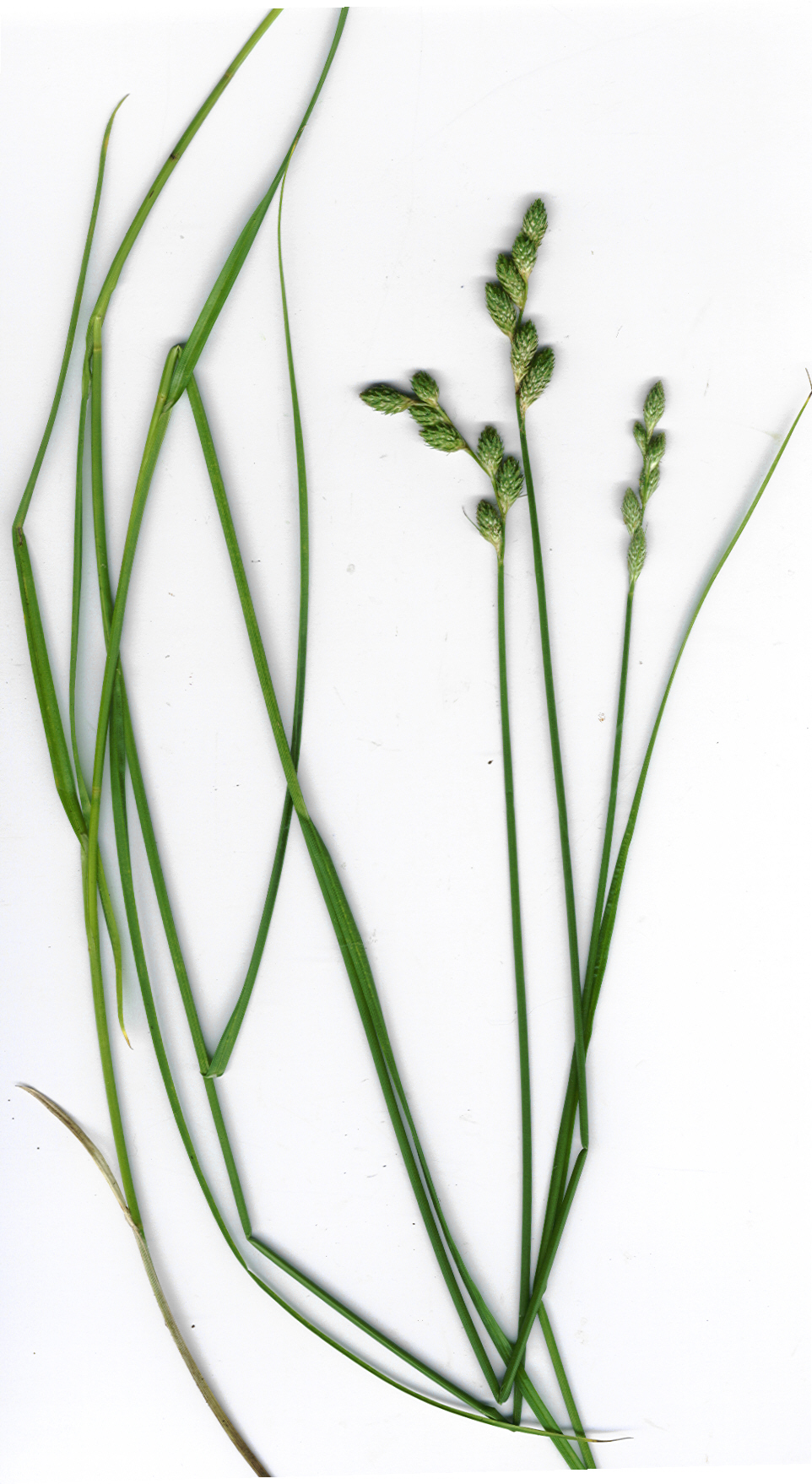

Conservation status
- Least Concern (IUCN 3.1)

Scientific classification
- Kingdom: Plantae
- Clade: Tracheophytes
- Clade: Angiosperms
- Clade: Monocots
- Clade: Commelinids
- Order: Poales
- Family: Cyperaceae
- Genus: Carex
- Subgenus: Carex subg. Vignea
- Section: Carex sect. Ovales
- Species: C. longii

Binomial name
- Carex longii Mack.

= Carex longii =

Species of grass-like plant

Carex longii, or Long's sedge, is a species of sedge found in North America that was first described by Kenneth Mackenzie in 1922.

== Description ==
Carex longii grows in tufts of inflorescences (flowering stems) and blades, up to 40 cm. Leaves are shorter than inflorescences, 2 mm wide, with light brown sheaths. The inflorescences are greenish-brown spikes without pedicels, born on stout stems with three corners. Spikes have both male and female flowers (with two stigmas 2), with males at the base. Glumes shorter and narrower than utricles, are obtuse or subacute, and hyaline with a green midrib. The nut is oblong and yellowish-brown.

== Distribution ==
C. longii's native range encompasses the eastern United States north into eastern Canada, as well as the west coast of the United States, Haiti, Puerto Rico, Central America, and South America.

C. longii has been introduced to British Columbia (Canada), Oregon, Washington and Hawaii (United States) and New Zealand.

=== Naturalised area ===
In New Zealand, C. longii was first recorded at Otakairangi swamp, Hikurangi, in 1949. By 1980, it was also recorded at Lake Waiparera and in Kaitaia. It has spread much further since, and is now common in wetlands and gumlands throughout Northland, from Kaimaumau wetland and Lake Rotokawau in the Far North, to Mangawhai in the south, with scattered localities across Auckland, north Waikato, and at Kaituna Wetland near Tauranga.

== Habitat ==
Carex longii lives on the margins of wetlands in saturated or seasonally saturated soils. It can be found in habitat types such as low fields, bogs, and bottomlands. In Michigan, its habitat is described as low, peaty woods, on grassy borders of swamps, and wet shores of lakes.

== Conservation ==
Carex longii is listed as Vulnerable or Imperiled across Eastern North America. It is listed as Critically Imperiled in Oklahoma, Ohio, Nova Scotia and West Virginia; Imperiled in Kentucky and Pennsylvania; Vulnerable is New York and Indiana; Extirpated in Missouri, Wisconsin, Ontario, and Vermont; and has no status or is secured elsewhere.

== Ecology ==
Carex longii fruits in early-med summer in North America.

== Taxonomy ==
What is now Carex longii was originally recognised as C. straminea var. cumulata in 1889, and was then moved to C. albolutescens. In 1923, it was recognised as a separate species and described by Kenneth Mackenzie. It is named after Bayard Long (1885-1969), a botanist from Philadelphia.

The type specimen was collected by Bayard Long at Cold Spring, Cape May County, New Jersey in 1907.
