= Heather Lake =

Heather Lake may refer to:

- Heather Lake (Montana), a lake in the Gallatin Range
- Heather Lake (Snohomish County, Washington), a lake in the Cascade Range

== See also ==
- Lake Heather, a lake in the Northland Region, New Zealand
