= List of lakes of Gallatin County, Montana =

There are at least 69 named lakes and reservoirs in Gallatin County, Montana.

== Lakes ==
- Ainger Lake, 45°55′46″N 110°58′09″W, el. 7,434 feet (2,266 m)
- Albino Lake, 45°05′17″N 111°17′28″W, el. 7,106 feet (2,166 m)
- Angler Lake, location unknown, el. 8,386 feet (2,556 m)
- Arden Lake, 45°24′56″N 110°59′21″W, el. 9,429 feet (2,874 m)
- Arrow Lake, 45°24′54″N 111°18′45″W, el. 8,976 feet (2,736 m)
- Axolotl Lake, 44°54′47″N 111°20′17″W, el. 7,552 feet (2,302 m)
- Bear Lakes, 45°33′08″N 110°51′49″W, el. 6,906 feet (2,105 m)
- Big Bear Lake, 45°28′58″N 111°06′02″W, el. 7,365 feet (2,245 m)
- Big Horn Lake, location unknown, el. 8,386 feet (2,556 m)
- Blackmore Lake, 45°28′12″N 110°59′10″W, el. 7,310 feet (2,230 m)
- Buffalo Horn Lakes, 45°07′15″N 111°06′59″W, el. 8,008 feet (2,441 m)
- Cascade Lakes, 45°21′08″N 111°16′06″W, el. 8,655 feet (2,638 m)
- Coffin Lake, 44°45′41″N 111°21′32″W, el. 8,425 feet (2,568 m)
- Crater Lake, 45°21′33″N 111°00′12″W, el. 9,314 feet (2,839 m)
- Crescent Lake, 45°28′28″N 110°57′47″W, el. 6,752 feet (2,058 m)
- Crystal Lake, 45°32′54″N 110°51′41″W, el. 6,991 feet (2,131 m)
- Deer Lake, 45°19′48″N 111°16′36″W, el. 9,144 feet (2,787 m)
- Dudley Lake, 45°19′24″N 111°18′43″W, el. 9,114 feet (2,778 m)
- Earthquake Lake, 44°49′45″N 111°25′33″W, el. 6,450 feet (1,970 m)
- Elf Lake, 45°54′33″N 110°57′43″W, el. 7,592 feet (2,314 m)
- Emerald Lake, 45°24′48″N 110°55′36″W, el. 8,904 feet (2,714 m)
- Fairy Lake, 45°54′16″N 110°57′32″W, el. 7,556 feet (2,303 m)
- Flanders Lake, 45°26′30″N 110°56′16″W, el. 8,586 feet (2,617 m)
- Frazier Lake, 45°55′28″N 110°58′27″W, el. 8,104 feet (2,470 m)
- Fridley Lakes, 45°24′03″N 110°56′13″W, el. 9,462 feet (2,884 m)
- Frog Pond, 44°35′39″N 111°06′50″W, el. 7,657 feet (2,334 m)
- Golden Trout Lakes, 45°14′01″N 111°08′06″W, el. 9,081 feet (2,768 m)
- Grace Lake, 45°22′00″N 111°20′53″W, el. 9,272 feet (2,826 m)
- Grayling Lake, 45°24′03″N 111°20′03″W, el. 8,337 feet (2,541 m)
- Heather Lake, 45°24′35″N 110°56′11″W, el. 9,186 feet (2,800 m)
- Hell Roaring Lake (Montana), 45°20′14″N 111°18′02″W, el. 9,186 feet (2,800 m)
- Hidden Lakes, 45°16′10″N 111°10′03″W, el. 8,681 feet (2,646 m)
- Hyalite Lake, 45°23′26″N 110°57′07″W, el. 8,875 feet (2,705 m)
- Johnson Lake, 44°49′56″N 111°10′10″W, el. 8,035 feet (2,449 m)
- Jumbo Lake, 45°22′00″N 111°15′54″W, el. 8,402 feet (2,561 m)
- Juncus Lake, 44°55′00″N 111°17′33″W, el. 8,284 feet (2,525 m)
- Lake Elsie (Montana), 45°14′27″N 111°05′24″W, el. 8,327 feet (2,538 m)
- Lake of the Pines, 45°23′23″N 111°08′17″W, el. 7,192 feet (2,192 m)
- Lava Lake, 45°22′39″N 111°14′44″W, el. 7,106 feet (2,166 m)
- Lillian Lake, 45°21′22″N 111°20′43″W, el. 8,881 feet (2,707 m)
- Little Bear Lake, 45°29′41″N 111°08′46″W, el. 7,319 feet (2,231 m)
- Lizard Lakes, 45°07′33″N 111°22′13″W, el. 8,717 feet (2,657 m)
- Lomna Lake, 44°58′41″N 111°18′57″W, el. 9,117 feet (2,779 m)
- Marble Lake, 45°05′44″N 111°16′06″W, el. 7,510 feet (2,290 m)
- Meadow Lake, 44°56′58″N 111°20′08″W, el. 8,527 feet (2,599 m)
- Minnie Lake, 44°55′52″N 111°20′03″W, el. 8,281 feet (2,524 m)
- Moon Lake, 45°19′28″N 111°16′31″W, el. 8,917 feet (2,718 m)

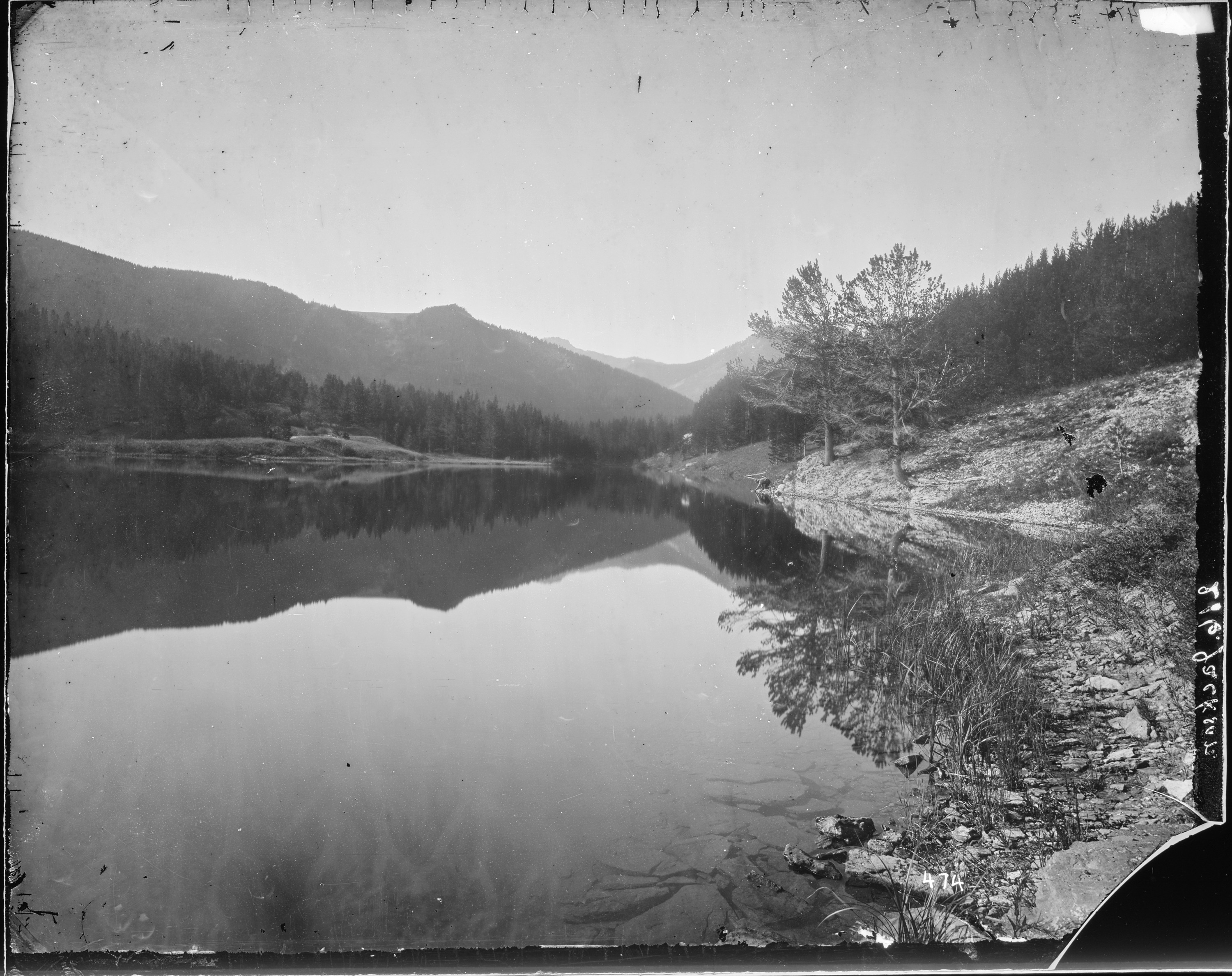
Mystic Lake in 1872

- Mystic Lake, 45°32′50″N 110°55′11″W, el. 6,398 feet (1,950 m)
- North Fork Lake (Montana), 45°22′50″N 111°20′09″W, el. 8,848 feet (2,697 m)
- Palace Lake, 45°25′24″N 110°59′16″W, el. 8,980 feet (2,740 m)
- Park Lake, 44°59′02″N 111°19′45″W, el. 8,661 feet (2,640 m)
- Pine Lake, 45°32′43″N 110°51′45″W, el. 7,149 feet (2,179 m)
- Pioneer Lakes, 45°24′17″N 111°11′26″W, el. 7,198 feet (2,194 m)
- Ramshorn Lake, 45°09′23″N 111°06′40″W, el. 8,428 feet (2,569 m)
- Rat Lake, 45°25′19″N 111°10′28″W, el. 6,506 feet (1,983 m)
- Rathbone Lake, 44°51′01″N 111°08′00″W, el. 7,638 feet (2,328 m)
- Rose Lake, 44°56′56″N 111°19′59″W, el. 8,592 feet (2,619 m)
- Swim Lake, 45°24′40″N 110°58′43″W, el. 9,445 feet (2,879 m)
- Thompson Lake (Gallatin County, Montana), 45°22′21″N 111°22′25″W, el. 9,114 feet (2,778 m)
- Turquoise Lake, 44°59′00″N 111°18′53″W, el. 9,104 feet (2,775 m)
- Twin Lakes, 45°22′41″N 110°56′36″W, el. 9,104 feet (2,775 m)
- Upper Coffin Lake, 44°45′46″N 111°22′00″W, el. 8,760 feet (2,670 m)
- Whits Lakes, 44°49′01″N 111°08′11″W, el. 7,283 feet (2,220 m)

== Reservoirs ==
- Hebgen Lake, 44°51′50″N 111°20′07″W, el. 6,539 feet (1,993 m)
- Hyalite Reservoir, 45°29′18″N 110°58′45″W, el. 6,634 feet (2,022 m)
- Lyman Creek Reservoir, 45°42′53″N 111°00′09″W, el. 5,046 feet (1,538 m)
- Meadow Lake, 45°05′12″N 111°17′45″W, el. 7,159 feet (2,182 m)
- Mystic Lake, 45°32′24″N 110°55′09″W, el. 6,476 feet (1,974 m)
- Old Cooper Reservoir, 45°33′48″N 110°51′58″W, el. 6,621 feet (2,018 m)

== See also ==
- List of lakes in Montana
