= Pilchuck =

Pilchuck may refer to:

== Places ==
- Mount Pilchuck
- Mount Pilchuck State Park
- Pilchuck River

== Schools ==
- Marysville Pilchuck High School
- Pilchuck Glass School
