= Awanui River =

River in Northland, New Zealand

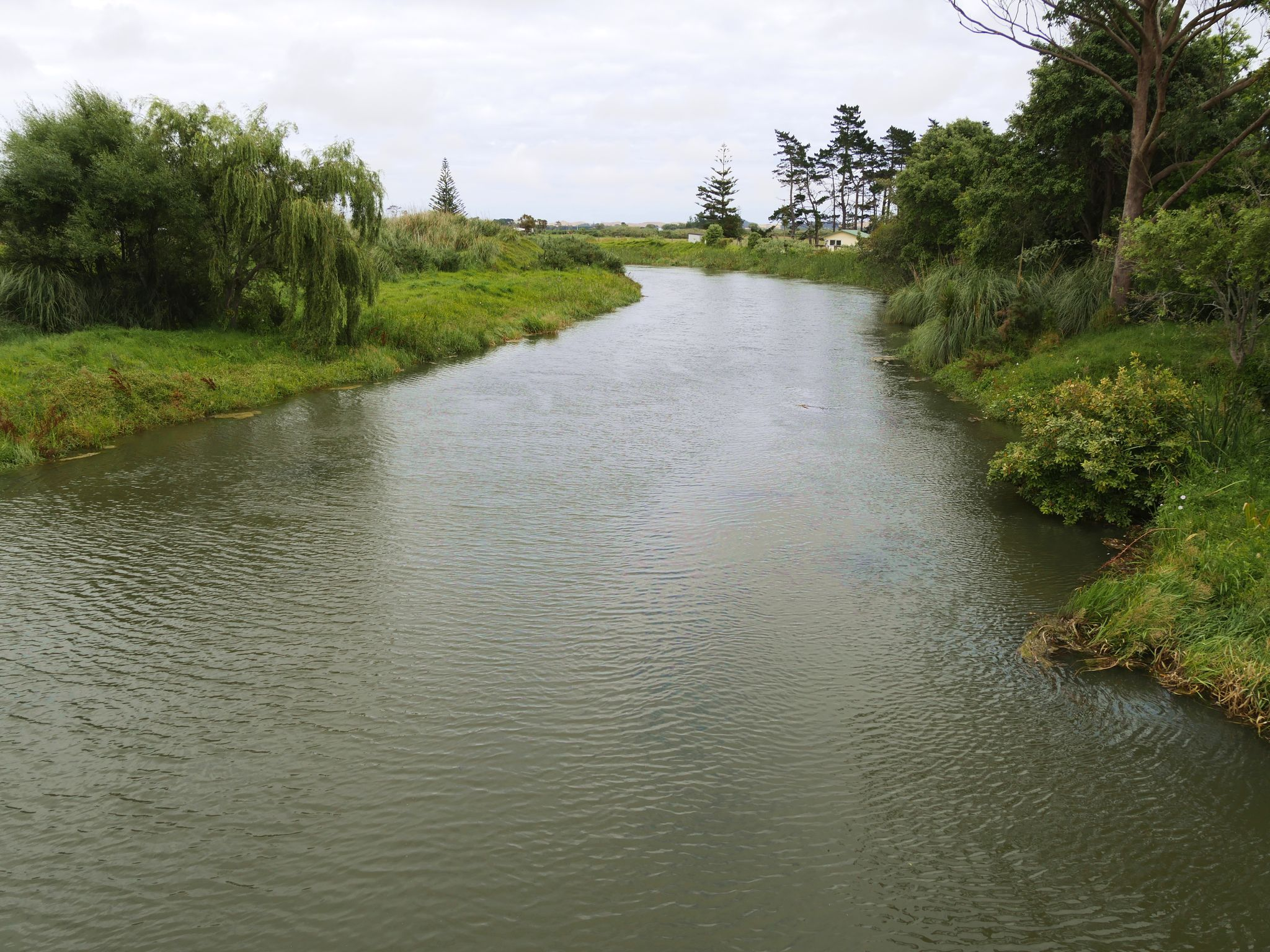
- Native name: Awanui (Māori)

Location
- Region: Northland
- District: Far North

Physical characteristics
- Source: Confluence of Victoria River and Karemuhako Stream
  - coordinates: 35.117°S 173.328°E
- Mouth: Rangaunu Harbour
  - coordinates: 35°01′S 173°16′E
- Length: 30 km (19 mi)

Basin features
- River system: Awanui River

The Awanui River is a river in the far north of New Zealand, close to the point at which the Aupouri Peninsula joins the rest of the Northland Peninsula. The Awanui flows first west and then north, for a total of 30 kilometres (19 mi), before flowing into Rangaunu Harbour. The town of Kaitaia is along its banks.

The four major upstream rivers which discharge into the Awanui River are the Takahue River, Victoria River, Karemuhako Stream, and Tarawhaturoa Stream.

The New Zealand Ministry for Culture and Heritage gives a translation of "large river" for Awanui.

== History ==
The Awanui River was extensively dredged for navigation until 1960, with a busy river port at Awanui exporting butter via coastal scows to Auckland, for trans-shipping to the UK. Upstream of Awanui it was dredged, and in places straightened, for flood control. Regular cargo scows included the Coronation, Tiri and Kapuni. Because of their shallow draught these scows were often assisted around the river bends by the work launch Ann, piloted by Harbourmaster Thomas George (Tom) Walker and later by his son Thomas Frederick (Larry) Walker. This family also operated the marine radio station ZLNF Awanui Radio, located at Unahi near the mouth of the river.

Thomas Frederick Walker died in 1987 and the Harbour Master's position was taken on by his son, Thomas Christopher Walker who still holds this position as of 2016. The position has been held by the Walker family for over 100 years.

== Flood hazard ==
Flooding poses a threat in the lower Awanui Catchment due to the low lying topography. The risk of flooding is particularly notable in the towns of Kaitaia and Awanui. Northland Regional Council monitors the Awanui River levels, as well as planning and implementing flood protection works.

== Water quality and ecology ==
The water quality of the river is monitored by Northland Regional Council, and the environmental information can be viewed on the LAWA website.

== Municipal water supply ==
The town of Kaitaia extracts water from the Awanui River.

== See also ==
- List of rivers of New Zealand
