= Splendrillia larochei =

Scientific classification
- Kingdom: Animalia
- Phylum: Mollusca
- Class: Gastropoda
- Subclass: Caenogastropoda
- Order: Neogastropoda
- Superfamily: Conoidea
- Family: Drilliidae
- Genus: Splendrillia
- Species: S. larochei

Binomial name
- Splendrillia larochei Powell, 1940

Species of gastropod

Splendrillia larochei is a species of sea snail, a marine gastropod mollusk in the family Drilliidae.

== Description ==
The length of the shell attains 16 mm, its diameter is 3 mm.

== Distribution ==
This marine species is endemic to New Zealand and occurs off Off Three Kings Islands, off Awanui Heads and off Rangaunu Bay.
