= Verlot Ranger Station-Public Service Center =

Coordinates: 48.0919°N 121.7808°W

- Verlot Public Service Center
- U.S. National Register of Historic Places
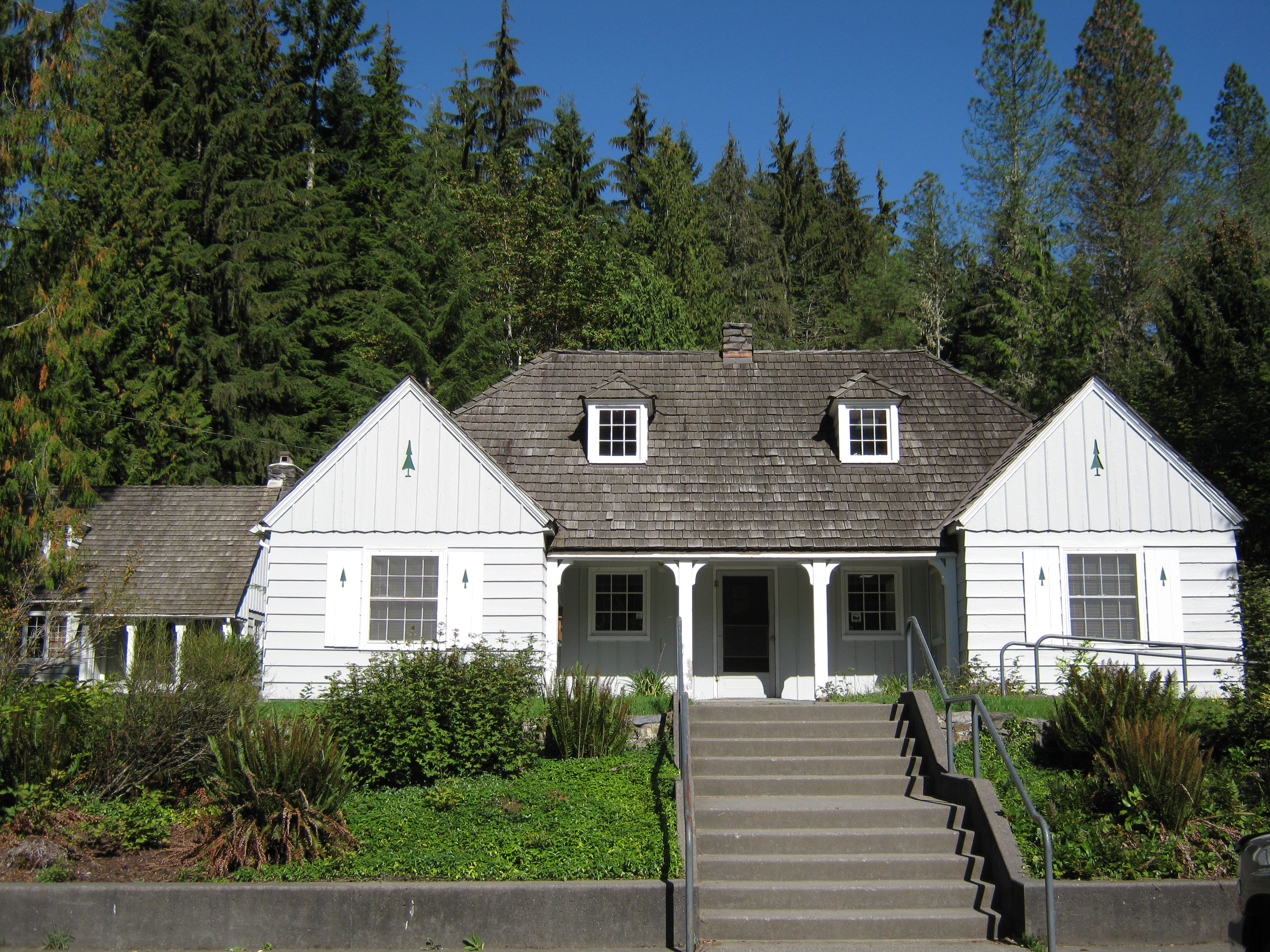
- Nearest city: Granite Falls, WA
- Built: 1933 - 1942
- MPS: Depression-Era Buildings TR
- NRHP reference No.: 86000839
- Added to NRHP: 1986-04-08

The Verlot Public Service Center used to be a ranger station, but is now just a visitor center after combining with the Darrington Ranger District. It is located on the Mountain Loop Highway eleven miles east of Granite Falls and is part of the Mt. Baker-Snoqualmie National Forest. The center was constructed by the CCC during the Great Depression and the building reflects the architectural style of that time. The building houses a museum, and maps, weather and hiking information, books, and park passes are available. Nearby popular trails include the Big Four Ice Caves, Mount Pilchuck, and Heather Lake.
