= Mount Bole =

Mountain in Montana, United States

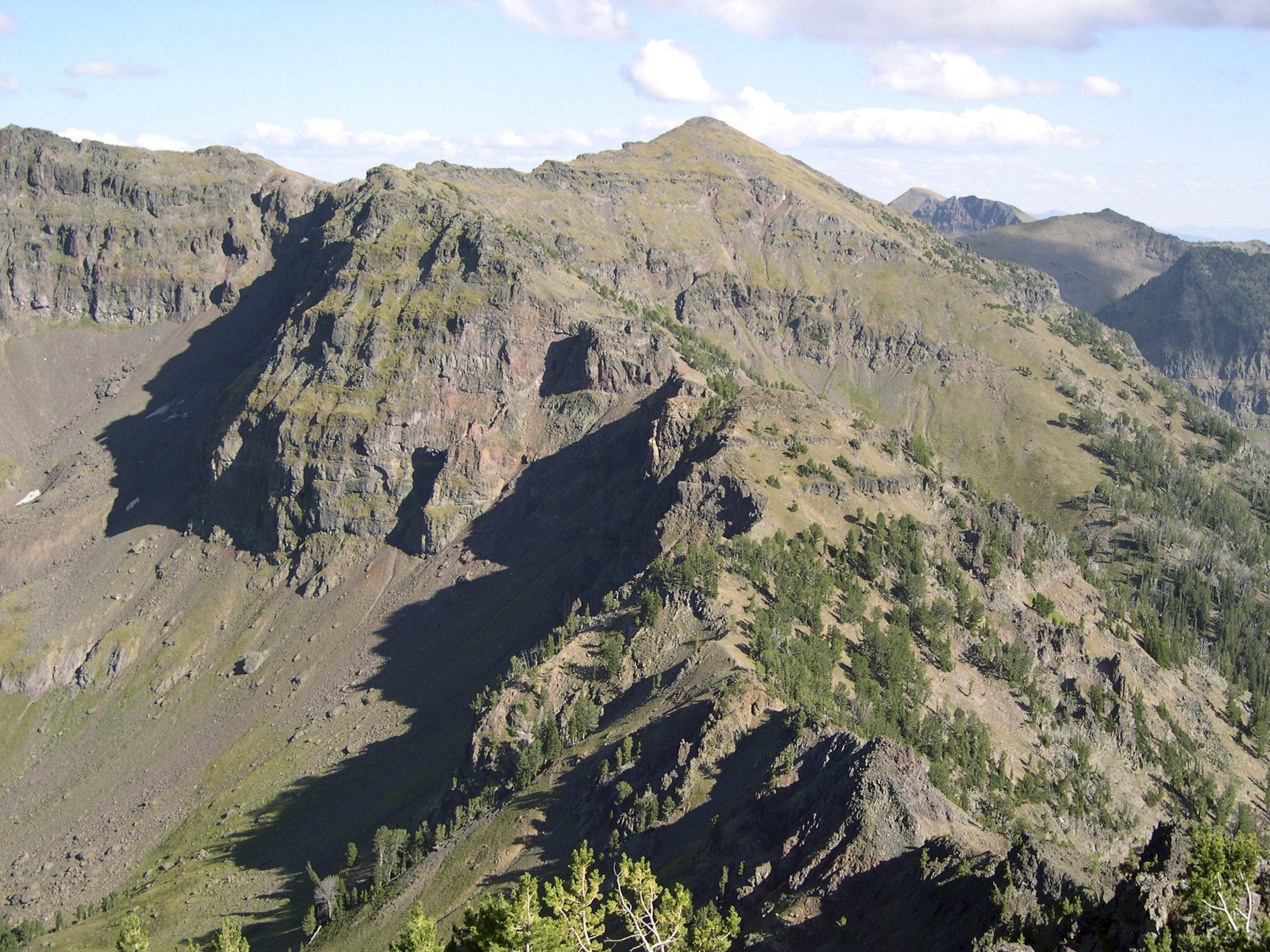
- Northwest aspect

Highest point
- Elevation: 10,339 ft (3,151 m)
- Prominence: 659 ft (201 m)
- Parent peak: Electric Peak (10,969 ft)
- Isolation: 14.51 mi (23.35 km)
- Coordinates: 45°24′57″N 110°59′53″W

Naming
- Etymology: William M. Bole

Geography
- Location within Montana Location within the United States
- Country: United States
- State: Montana
- County: Gallatin
- Protected area: Gallatin National Forest
- Parent range: Gallatin Range; Rocky Mountains
- Topo map: USGS Fridley Peak

Mount Bole is a 10,339-foot (3,151-metre) mountain summit in Gallatin County, Montana, United States.

== Description ==
Mount Bole is located 18 miles (29 km) south of Bozeman in the northern Gallatin Range, which is a subrange of the Rocky Mountains. It is set in the Gallatin National Forest and the Hyalite Porcupine Buffalo Horn Wilderness Study Area. The peak is the highest peak on Hyalite Ridge and it ranks as the fourth-highest peak in the Gallatin Range. Precipitation runoff from the mountain drains into tributaries of the Gallatin River. Topographic relief is significant as the summit rises over 2,500 feet (762 meters) above Storm Castle Creek in 0.85 miles (1.37 km). The mountain's toponym has been officially adopted by the United States Board on Geographic Names, and it honors William M. Bole (1858–1932), editor and owner of the Bozeman Weekly Chronicle (1902–1917), who owned land in the nearby Hyalite drainage where he built a recreational cabin.

== Climate ==
Based on the Köppen climate classification, Mount Bole is located in a subarctic climate zone characterized by long, usually very cold winters, and mild summers. Winter temperatures can drop below 0 °F with wind chill factors below −10 °F.

== See also ==
- Geology of the Rocky Mountains
