= Pairatahi River =

Coordinates: 35°01′S 173°17′E

Location
- Country: New Zealand

Physical characteristics
- Mouth
  - location: Rangaunu Harbour
- Length: 10 km (6.2 mi)

The Pairatahi River is a river of the Northland Region of New Zealand's North Island. It flows generally north to reach Rangaunu Harbour to the northeast of Awanui.

== See also ==
- List of rivers of New Zealand
