= Lake Rotokawau (Aupōuri Peninsula) =

Lake in the North Island of New Zealand

- Location within Northland Region
- Location: Northland Region, North Island
- Coordinates: 35.0187°S 173.2056°E
- Type: peat
- Catchment area: 46 hectares (110 acres)
- Basin countries: New Zealand
- Max. length: 430 metres (1,410 ft)
- Max. width: 430 metres (1,410 ft)
- Surface area: 17.2 hectares (43 acres)
- Max. depth: 3.4 metres (11 ft)
- Residence time: 18 months
- Surface elevation: 39.6 metres (130 ft)

Lake Rotokawau is a dune lake on the Aupōuri Peninsula the Far North, New Zealand. The name is also used for lakes in the Kaipara District (Poutu Peninsula), Chatham Islands, in Bay of Plenty and near Lake Waikare in Waikato.

Lake Rotokawau is near Rotokawau Road, off State Highway 1 North of Kaitaia.

The lake catchment is predominantly pasture (70%), scrub (30%) and planted forest. The lake itself has no major inflows or outflow.

The Bushland Trust, working with the Department of Conservation and Northland Regional Council is undertaking restoration at Lake Rotokawau, as well as other nearby dune lakes, such as Lake Heather, Lake Rotoroa, Lake Ngatu, Lake Gem and Lake Ngakapua.

== Etymology ==
In Māori, rotokawau means "cormorant lake" (roto = lake, kawau = cormorant).

== See also ==
- List of lakes in New Zealand
