= Mangatete River =

Coordinates: 35°00′55″S 173°17′36″E

Location
- Country: New Zealand

Physical characteristics
- Mouth
  - location: Rangaunu Harbour
- Length: 12 km (7.5 mi)

The Mangatete River or Mangatete Stream is a river of the Northland Region of New Zealand's North Island. It flows northwest from its origins to the east of Kaitaia, reaching the Rangaunu Harbour to the east of Awanui.

== See also ==
- List of rivers of New Zealand
