= Huahua =

Huahua may refer to:

== People ==
- Huang Huahua, Governor of Guangdong (2003-2011)
- Li Huahua, Chinese fencers

== Places ==
- Wai Te Huahua, Maori name of Lake Heather, New Zealand

== Other ==
- Zhong Zhong and Hua Hua, one of a pair of cloned monkeys
- Hua Hua (giant panda)
- The Maori term for a calabash of preserved birds.
