= Lake Gem (New Zealand) =

Lake in New Zealand

Coordinates: 35°02′22″S 173°11′40″E

Lake Gem, also known as Lake Little Gem, is a lake in the Northland region of the North Island of New Zealand. South of the larger Lake Ngatu, it is the site of a community restoration project involving pest control and revegetation. The lake is monitored by Northland Regional Council, who have been involved in the environmental development of the lake alongside various other groups like the Bushlands Trust, DOC, Fish & Game NZ, and Ngāi Takoto.

== Accessibility ==
It is accessible by Lake Ngatu Road off Sweetwater Road.

== See also ==
- List of lakes in New Zealand
