= Victoria River (New Zealand) =

Location
- Country: New Zealand
- Region: Northland
- District: Far North

Physical characteristics
- Source
  - location: Maungataniwha Range
- Mouth
  - location: Awanui River
  - coordinates: 35.117°S 173.328°E
- Length: 18 km (11 mi)

Basin features
- River system: Awanui River
- Tributaries
  - left: Takahue River

The Victoria River is a river of the Northland Region of New Zealand's North Island. It flows generally northwest from the Maungataniwha Range, reaching the Awanui River to the east of Kaitaia.

== See also ==
- List of rivers of New Zealand
