= Pita Tipene =

New Zealand Māori leader

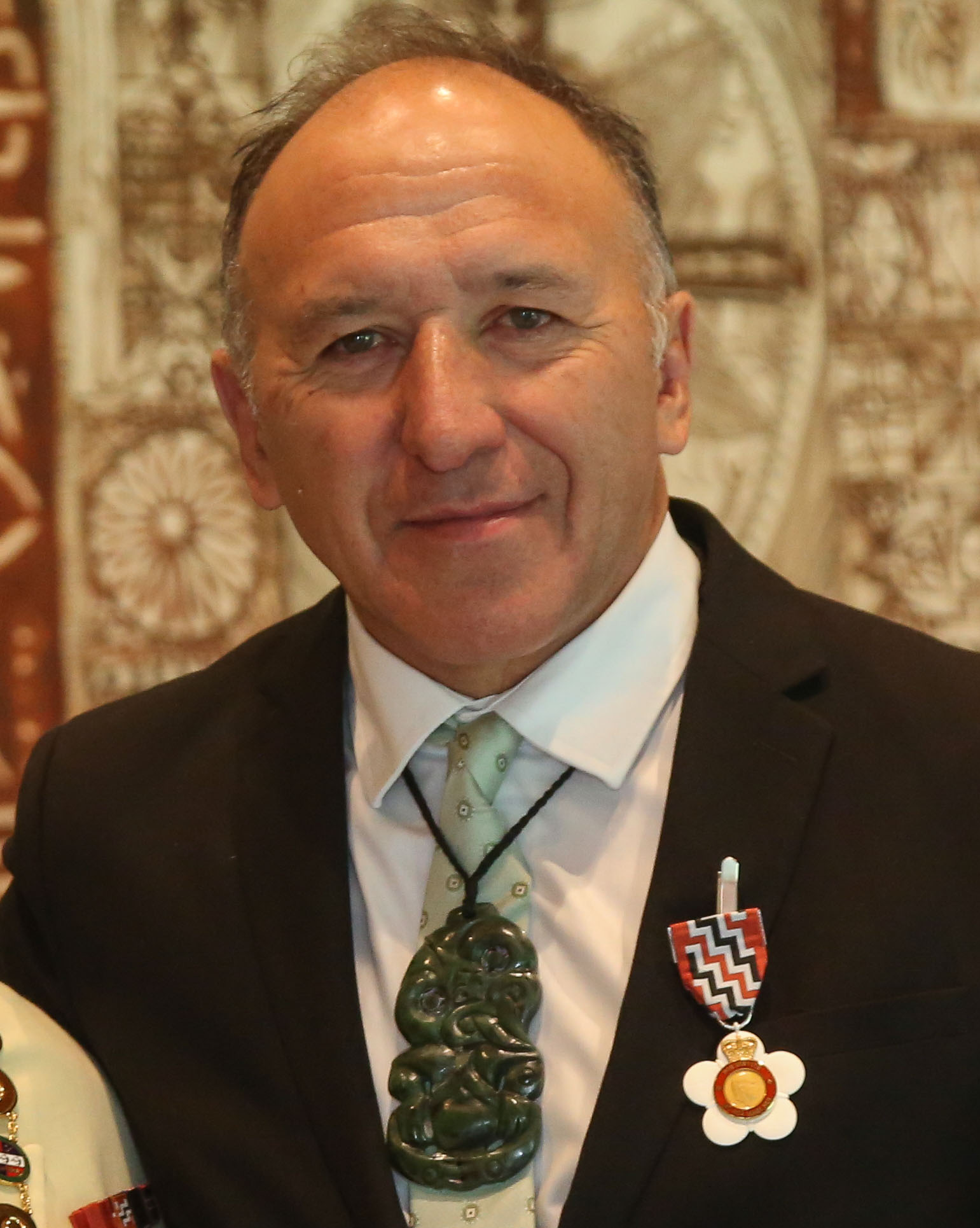
- Tipene in 2025

Chair of the Northland Regional Council
- Incumbent
- Assumed office 5 November 2025
- Deputy: Jack Craw
- Preceded by: Geoff Crawford

Northland regional councillor for the Te Raki Māori constituency
- Incumbent
- Assumed office 18 October 2025 Serving with Arama Morunga

Personal details
- Born: 1960 or 1961 (age 65–66)
- Party: Independent

Pita Tipene KSO (born 1960 or 1961) is a New Zealand politician and Māori leader. He has served as the chair of the Northland Regional Council since 5 November 2025. Prior to this he had served for seven years as the chair of the Waitangi National Trust. He was made a Companion of the King's Service Order in June 2025 for his 30 years of service to Māori.

== Early life ==
Tipene grew up in Motatau, Northland, as the ninth of eleven children.

== Northland Regional Council chairmanship ==
Following his election to the Northland Regional Council, Tipene was elected as the new chair at the inaugural council meeting. He defeated incumbent chair Geoff Crawford 5-to-3.

In February 2026, Tipene called on Cabinet Ministers to stop making "derogatory" comments about local councils.

== Electoral history ==
=== Northland Regional Council ===
==== 2025 Te Raki Māori constituency election ====
Te Raki Māori constituency
Affiliation	Candidate	Votes	%	+/−
Independent	Pita Tipene	6,515	55.55	(new)
Te Pāti Māori	Arama Morunga	5,297	45.16	(new)
Independent	Peter-Lucas Jones	3,882	33.10	−16.78
Independent	Tui Shortland	3,655	31.16	−37.10
Informal		582	4.96	+3.20
Blank		315	2.69	−1.32
Turnout		11,729	(43.22)	(+14.58)
Registered		27,140		
Independent gain from Independent Green				
Te Pāti Māori gain from Independent				
incumbent
