= Takahue River =

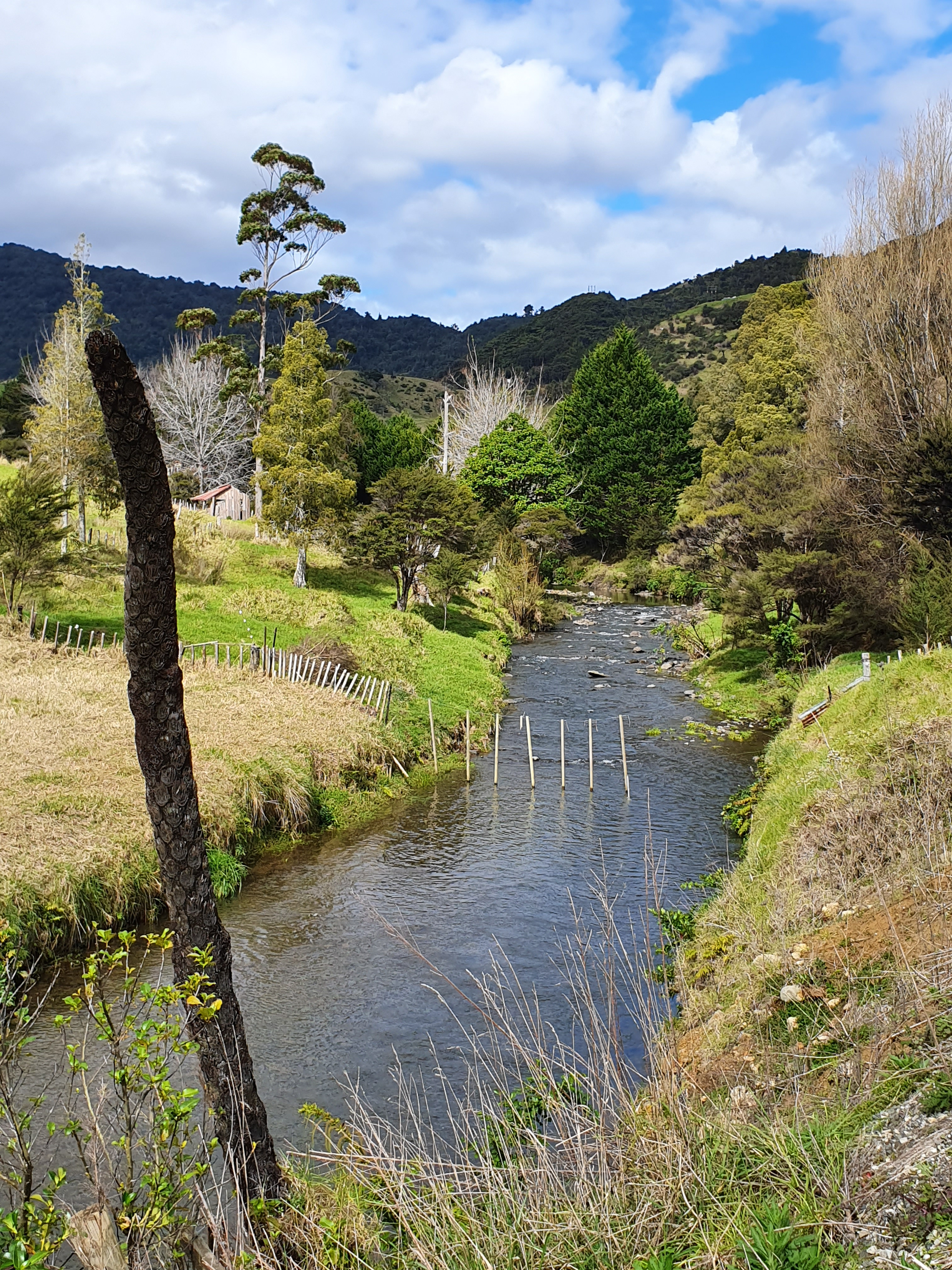
- Native name: Takahue (Māori)

Location
- Country: New Zealand
- Region: Northland
- District: Far North

Physical characteristics
- Source: Maungataniwha Range
- Mouth: Victoria River
  - coordinates: 35°08′S 173°21′E
- Length: 19 km (12 mi)

Basin features
- River system: Awanui River

The Takahue River is a river of the Northland Region of New Zealand's North Island. It initially flows southwest from its sources in the Maungataniwha Range before turning north. It passes the settlement of Takahue before reaching the Victoria River seven kilometres east of Kaitaia.

== See also ==
- List of rivers of New Zealand
