= Lake Waiparera =

Lake in the North Island of New Zealand

- Location within Northland Region
- Location: Northland Region, North Island
- Coordinates: 34.944799°S 173.181927°E
- Type: dune lake
- Catchment area: 315.7 hectares (780 acres)
- Basin countries: New Zealand
- Surface area: 103.0 hectares (255 acres)
- Max. depth: 6.0 metres (19.7 ft)

Lake Waiparera is a dune lake in the Northland Region of New Zealand. It is located immediately North-West of Waiharara on the Aupouri Peninsula. The lake is the largest of the Aupouri Lakes. The catchment is predominantly pasture (approximately 70%), with the remainder scrub or wetland. The lake has several inflows (drains), with no obvious outflows. The lake is easily accessed from SH1.

The lake is monitored by Northland Regional Council, and the environmental information can be viewed on the LAWA website.

== See also ==
- List of lakes in New Zealand
