= Lake Ngakapua =

Lake in New Zealand

- Location within Northland Region
- Location: Northland Region, North Island
- Coordinates: 35°01′13″S 173°11′13″E
- Basin countries: New Zealand
- Max. depth: 8.2 metres (27 ft)

Lake Ngakapua is a dune lake in the Northland Region of New Zealand. It is located to the northwest of Awanui, near Waipapakauri on the Aupōuri Peninsula.

The lake has no defined inflows or outflows. The lake consists of two basins; the North is smaller and deeper (2.2 ha in size, c. 8.2 m deep), while the South is larger and slightly shallower (6.7 ha in size, c. 5.2 m deep). The lake catchment area is predominantly pastoral, with some scrub and planted forest.

== See also ==
- List of lakes in New Zealand
