= Rangaunu Harbour =

Harbour in New Zealand

- Location within Northland Region
- Location: Northland Region
- Coordinates: 34°56′S 173°17′E
- Ocean/sea sources: South Pacific Ocean
- Basin countries: New Zealand
- Max. length: 13 kilometres (8.1 mi)
- Max. width: 9.5 kilometres (5.9 mi)
- Surface area: 115 square kilometres (44 sq mi)

Rangaunu Harbour is a shallow harbour in the far north of New Zealand. It is situated on the east coast at the base of the Aupouri Peninsula. The name in Māori means "To pull out a shoal of fish". With an area of 115 square kilometres (44 sq mi) it is the fifth-largest harbour in New Zealand.

== History ==
Rangaunu Harbour was traditionally used as a managed shark fishery by Māori. Hapū would travel across Northland to the harbour, where kapetā (school sharks) could be fished only two days in a year. The harbour was an important location for the late 19th and early 20th century kauri gum digging trade.

== Demographics ==
Historical population
Year	Pop.	±% p.a.
2006	63	—
2013	63	+0.00%
2018	45	−6.51%

Statistics New Zealand covers both Rangaunu Harbour and Houhora Harbour to the north in a statistical area called Inlets Far North District. It uses a statistical area called Rangaunu Harbour in the 2018 New Zealand census which covers the land west of the harbour between Awanui and Houhora Heads . That area is covered by the article on Aupouri Peninsula.

Inlets Far North District had a population of 45 at the 2018 New Zealand census, a decrease of 18 people (-28.6%) since the 2013 census and the 2006 census. There were 60 households. There were 27 males and 18 females, giving a sex ratio of 1.5 males per female. Of the total population, no people were aged up to 15 years, 3 (6.7%) were 15 to 29, 27 (60.0%) were 30 to 64, and 15 (33.3%) were 65 or older. Figures may not add up to the total due to rounding.

Ethnicities were 100.0% European/Pākehā. No other ethnicities were recorded for this area.

The percentage of people born overseas was 40.0, compared with 27.1% nationally.

Although some people objected to giving their religion, 53.3% had no religion, 40.0% were Christian, and no one gave any other religion.

Of those at least 15 years old, 15 (33.3%) people had a bachelor or higher degree, and 3 (6.7%) people had no formal qualifications. The median income was $20,600. The employment status of those at least 15 was that 12 (26.7%) people were employed full-time, 6 (13.3%) were part-time, and 3 (6.7%) were unemployed.

== Geography ==
The harbour entrance is a 2-kilometre (1.2 mi) wide channel to Rangaunu Bay to the north. The eastern side of the harbour is a 4 kilometres (2.5 mi) wide tombolo separating it from Doubtless Bay and connecting the hillier Karikari Peninsula to the mainland. The small settlement of Rangiputa sits on the eastern side of the harbour entrance, and Kaimaumau is located on the western shore about 5 kilometres (3.1 mi) southwest of the entrance. Unahi, at the mouth of the Awanui River, has a wharf and a fish processing plant which is now closed.

An extensive wetland area, the Kaimaumau wetland, including the Motutangi Swamp Scientific Reserve, lies to the west of the harbour, north of Kaimaumau.

The harbour has extensive areas of mangroves, tidal sand flats and areas of eelgrass, plus several small islands, with deeper channels between.

A number of rivers flow into the harbour. Clockwise from the entrance, these are:

- Te Putaaraukai River
- Mangatete River
- Pairatahi River
- Awanui River
- Waimanoni Creek
- Waipapakauri Creek
- Waiparera Stream

== Ecology ==
Rangaunu Harbour contains about 15% of the mangrove habitat in New Zealand. It is a habitat of international significance for migratory wading birds, with 10,000 birds of approximately 70 species using the harbour in the autumn. Birds observed to nest in the area include NZ dotterels, variable oystercatchers, black-backed gulls, red-billed gulls, white-fronted terns, Caspian terns, black shags, little shags, pied shags, pied stilts, white-faced herons, ducks and swans.

Dolphins, orca, and occasionally humpback whales visit the harbour. Other cetacean species such as Bryde's whales, sperm whales, pilot whales, and false killer whales are known to come into Rangaunu Bay and around Karikari Peninsula, but very few whales actually appear in Rangaunu Harbour. The harbour environment is an ideal habitat for southern right whales, and Rangaunu Harbour might once have been a resting/calving ground for these coast-hugging whales.

Rangaunu Harbour hosts a population of green sea turtles that are seasonal migrants into the harbour water, predominantly juveniles found at high tide amongst seagrass (Zostera muelleri novozelandica). In 2025, two green turtles were fitted with tracking devices and released at Rangiputa beach to see where they travel to. Whale sharks have been seen in the harbour occasionally.
