= Frazier Lake =

Lake in Gallatin County, Montana

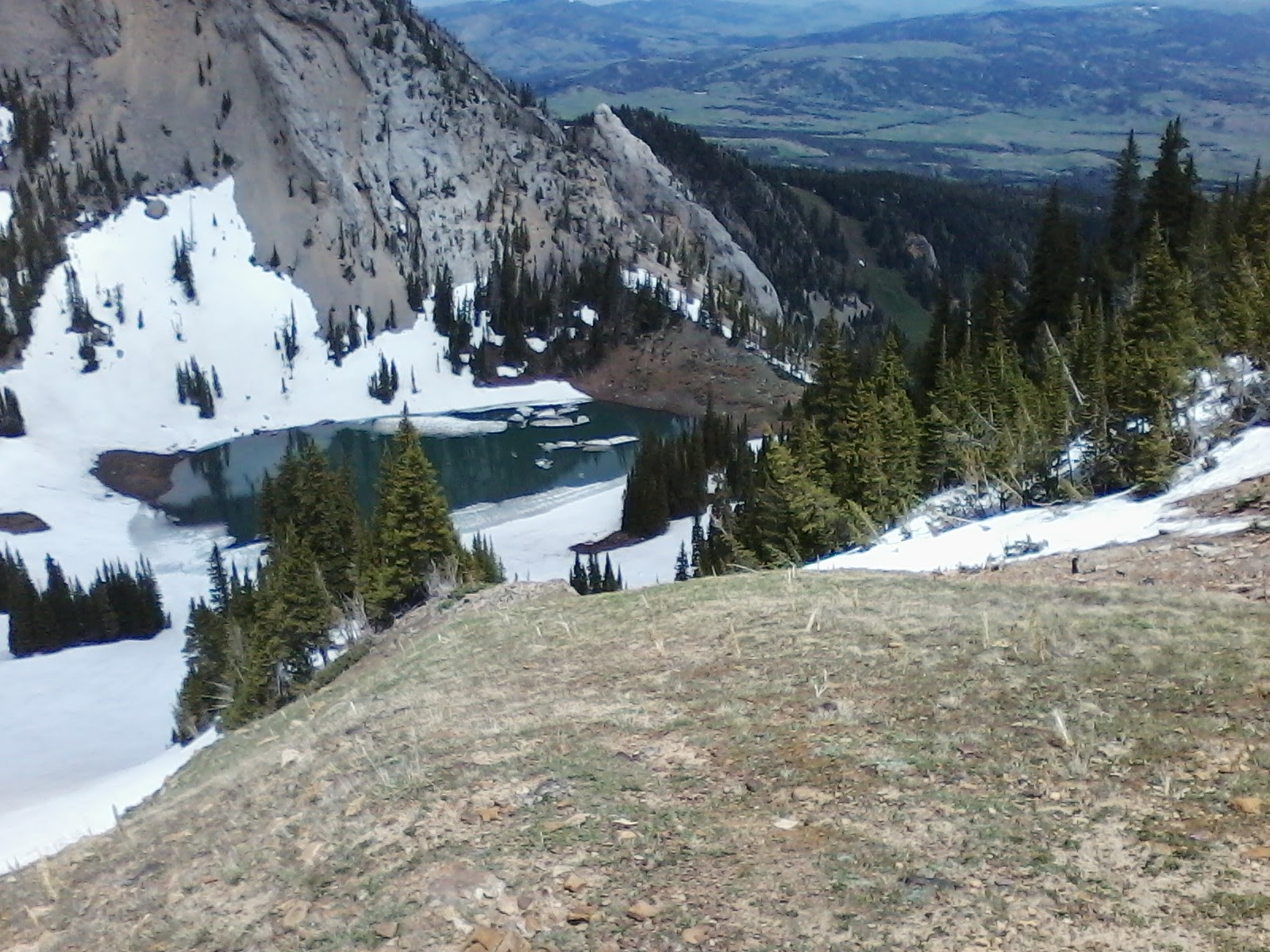

- Location within Montana Location within the United States
- Location: Gallatin County, Montana
- Coordinates: 45°55′29″N 110°58′25″W
- Type: Lake
- Basin countries: United States
- Surface elevation: 8,097 ft (2,468 m)

Frazier Lake is a seasonal lake in Gallatin County, Montana in the Bridger Range in south central Montana. It is located near Fairy Lake in the Gallatin National Forest and sits at an elevation of 8,097 ft (2,468 m).
