= Mount Pilchuck State Park =

State park in Washington (state), United States

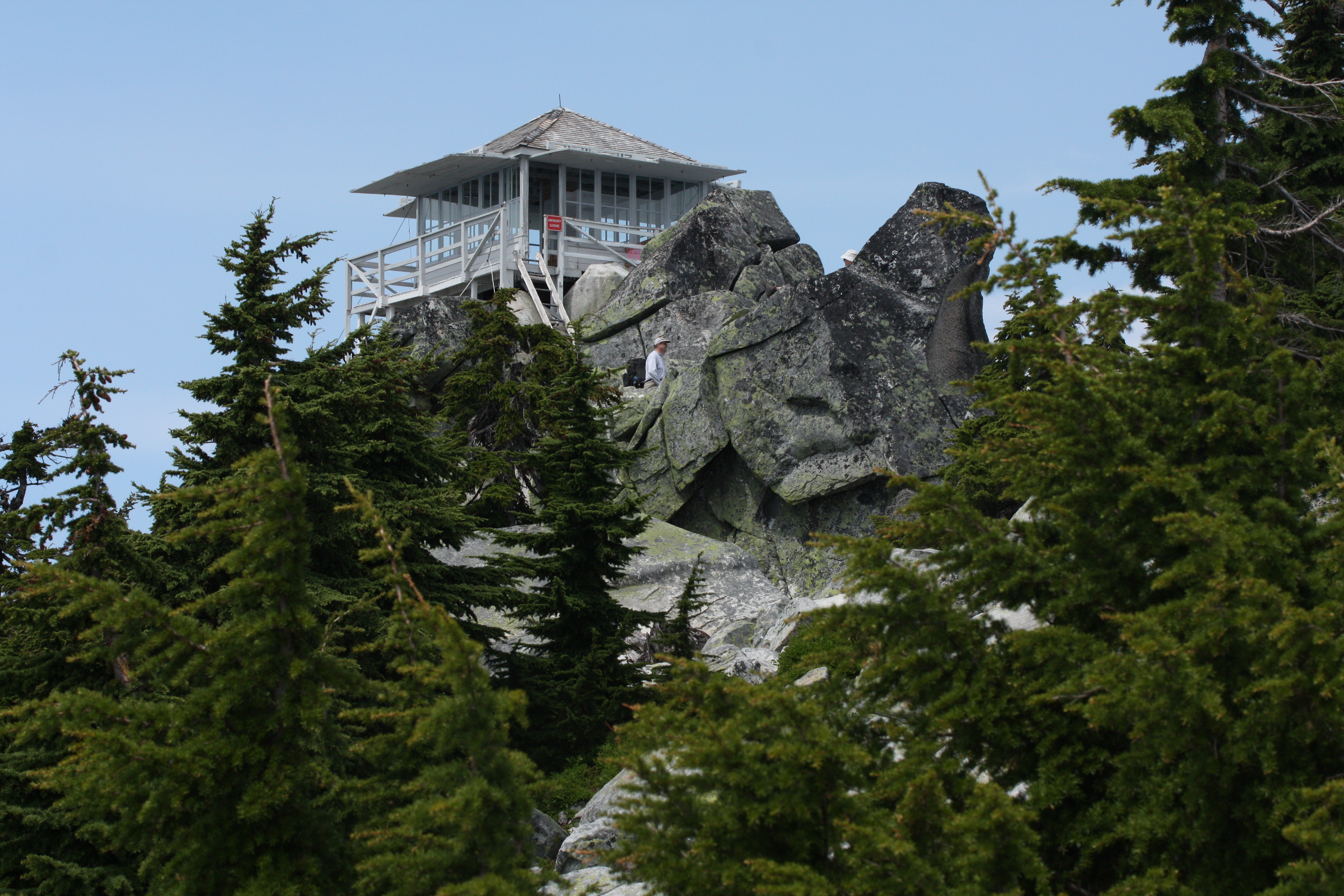
- Fire lookout on summit

- Location within Washington (state) Location within the United States
- Location: Snohomish County, Washington, United States
- Coordinates: 48°03′28″N 121°47′52″W
- Area: 1,903 acres (770 ha)
- Elevation: 5,273 ft (1,607 m)
- Established: 1951
- Administrator: Washington State Parks and Recreation Commission
- Website: Official website

Mount Pilchuck State Park is a public recreation area located seven miles (11 km) east of Granite Falls, Washington, on the western edges of the Cascade Mountains. The state park features 1,903 acres (770 ha) of alpine scenery, recreational activities, and Mount Pilchuck itself. The main point of interest is the 3-mile (4.8 km) trail to the peak and the old fire lookout located on the summit, 5,324 feet (1,623 m) above sea level.

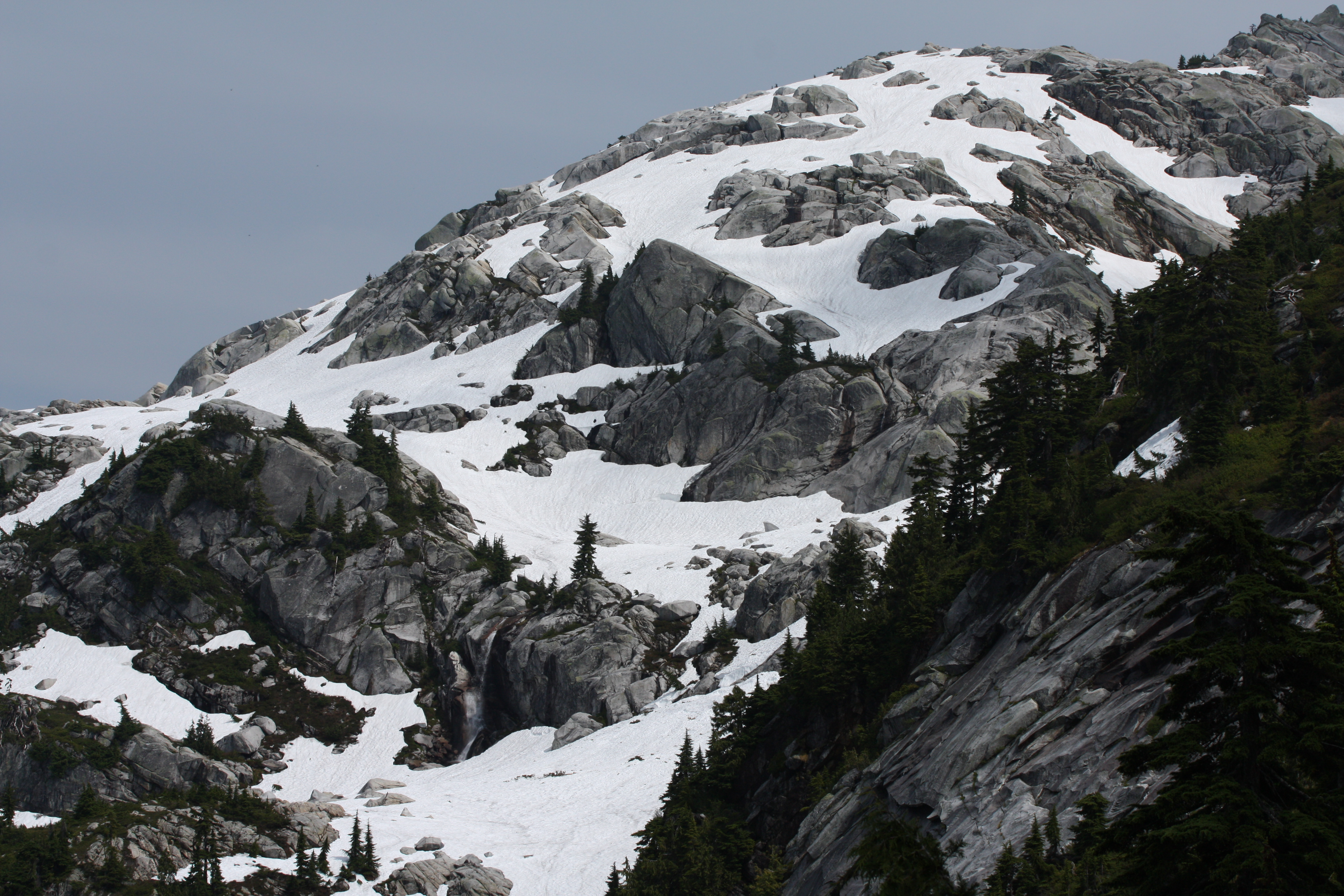
View from hiking trail

== History ==
The name "Pilchuck" originated from the Native American name of "red water" for a creek in the area. The U.S. Forest Service built a fire lookout on the summit in 1918 which was staffed until the 1960s. Washington State Parks administered a concessionaire-run ski area on the slopes of Mt. Pilchuck from 1957 to 1980, when it was closed due to poor snow conditions. The park is managed in partnership with the USFS and the Everett Mountaineers.
