= Heather Lake (Snohomish County, Washington) =

Lake in Washington, U.S.

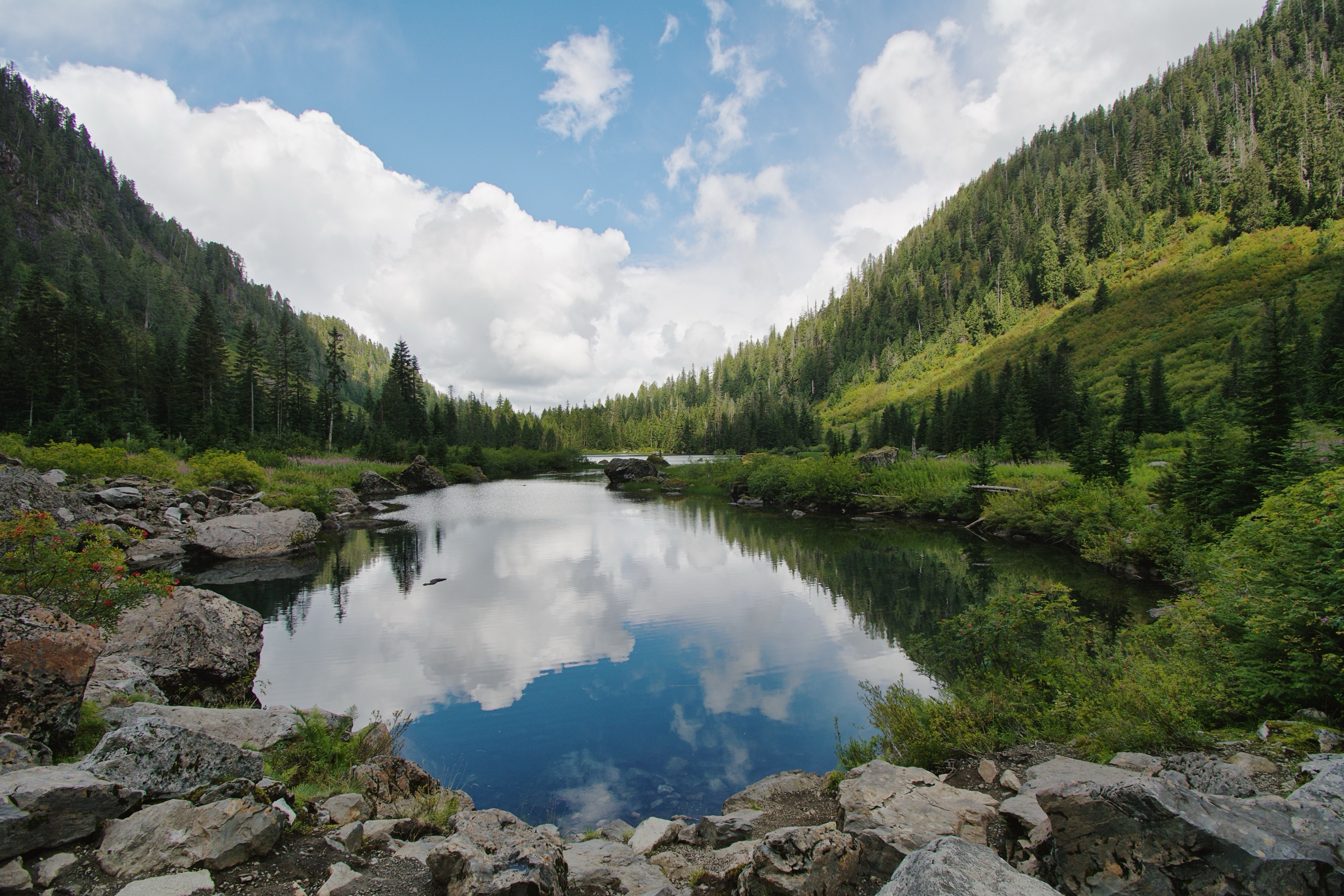
- Heather Lake in August 2026

- Location within Washington (state) Location within the United States
- Location: Mount Baker–Snoqualmie National Forest, Snohomish County, Washington, U.S.
- Coordinates: 48.0680934°N 121.7820267°W
- Type: Glacial lake
- Primary outflows: Heather Creek
- Managing agency: United States Forest Service
- Surface area: 13.90 acres (5.63 ha)
- Surface elevation: 2,399 feet (731 m)

Heather Lake is a subalpine lake at the foot of Mount Pilchuck in Snohomish County, Washington, United States. The lake is 2,399 feet (731 m) above sea level and is accessed via the Heather Lake Trail. It receives an estimated 22,000 visitors each summer, making it the third most popular site in the Mountain Loop Highway region, behind the Big Four Ice Caves and Lake Twentytwo.

== Access ==
Heather Lake Trail is the only way to reach Heather Lake on foot. From the trailhead on Pilchuck Access Road it is 2 miles to the lake, rising about 1,000 feet, and is a popular hiking trail year-round.

The trail begins on part of a logging road created in the 1940s, and thus the first section of forest is second-growth trees until the 1.2 mile mark, where the trees turn into old-growth forest. It roughly follows Heather Creek up the mountain until it reaches Heather Lake. A further 0.8-mile path surrounds the lake, with part of the surface being boardwalk.

Visitor access to the trail and lake requires a Northwest Forest Pass (which can be purchased at the Verlot Public Service Center one mile before the access road) or an America the Beautiful Pass.

== Characteristics ==
Heather Lake, created by glacial activity, lies in a cirque on the north-eastern slope of Mount Pilchuck (part of the Cascade Range). The lake is fed by streams of water falling down the mountain cliff into talus, which gradually drain into the lake, then again into Heather Creek. The lake freezes during the winter, but the ice does not get thick enough to support an adult due to the lake's relatively low altitude. The lake itself contains rainbow trout that grow up to ten inches long on average.

Most of the trees along the lakeshore are mountain hemlock, with some copses of Alaska yellow cedar. Wildflowers grow on the eastern shore of the lake, including marsh marigolds, trillium, and asters. Heather Lake Trail passes through forests of Douglas fir, western red cedar, and Alaska yellow cedar.

== Gallery ==
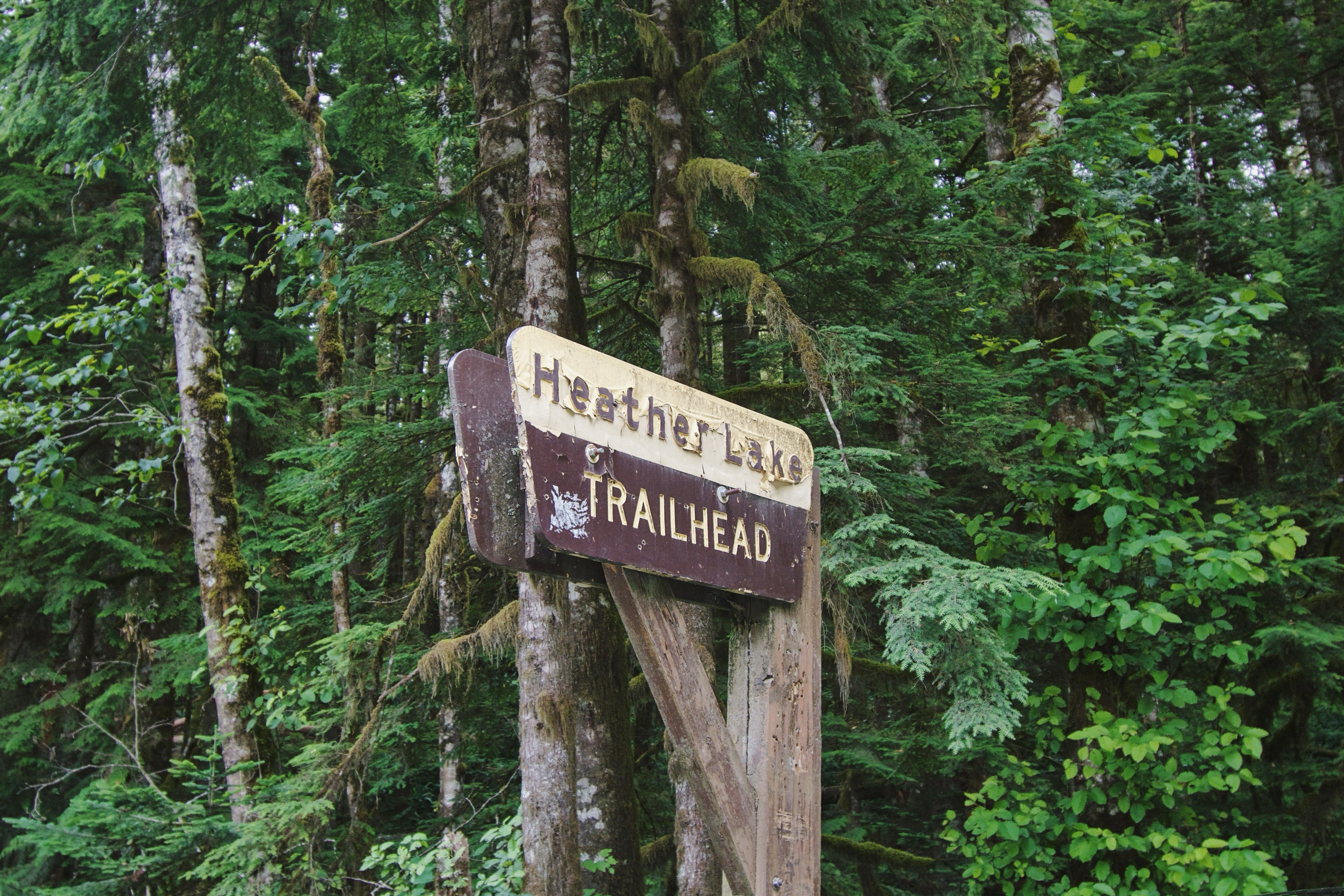
The sign marking the start of the Heather Lake Trail

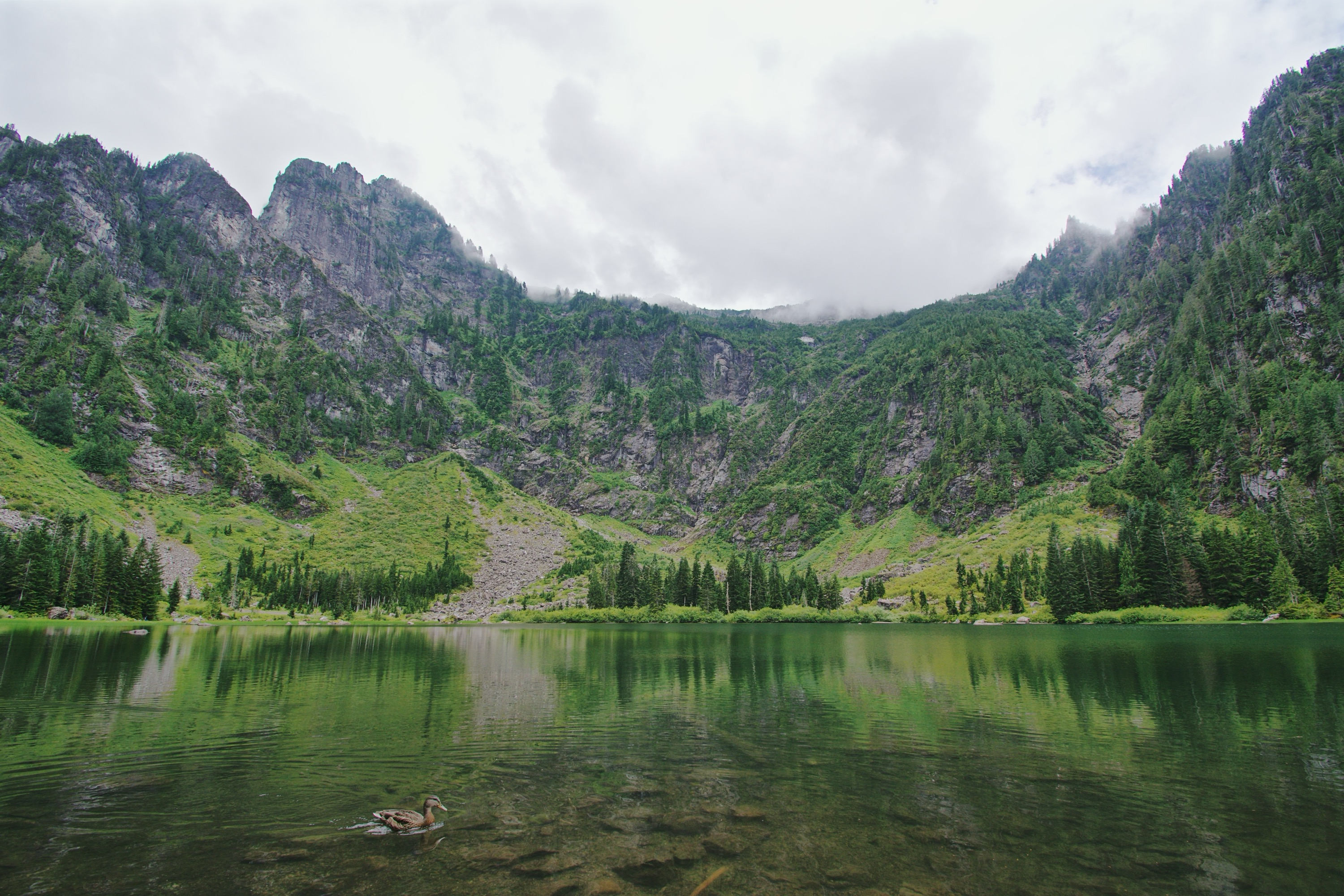
Heather Lake with Mount Pilchuck in the background

== See also ==
- List of lakes in Washington
- List of lakes of the United States
