= Kaimaumau wetland =

Wetland in Northland, New Zealand

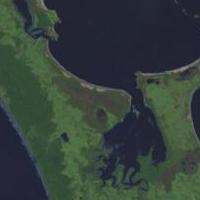
- Landsat image centered on the Kaimaumau wetland, Northland
- Interactive map of Kaimaumau wetland
- Location: Northland, New Zealand
- Coordinates: 34°53′47″S 173°13′47″E
- Area: 1,860 hectares (4,600 acres)

The Kaimaumau wetland is a wetland by the Rangaunu Harbour, in Northland, New Zealand. At approximately 1,860 hectares (4,600 acres), it is one of the largest remaining wetlands in Northland. It comprises the Otiaita and Waihauhau swamps, Motutangi Swamp Scientific Reserve, and Lake Waikaramū. The wetland is currently threatened by peat mining and by water loss from avocado growing.

== Biodiversity ==
Kaimaumau is home to a large number of rare or endangered New Zealand plants, birds, and reptiles, and is biologically significant because of its mixture of dunes and wetlands. The presence of native mudfish and eels qualifies Kaimaumau wetland as a Significant Natural Area (SNA) under the Resource Management Act. From a biodiversity viewpoint, it is considered the second most important wetland in Northland, which has lost 94.5 percent of its wetlands. It has rare orchids such as Thelymitra "Ahipara", one of New Zealand's only two native sun orchids. Kaimaumau is home to fernbirds and marsh crakes. Its threatened plant species include Utricularia australis, Utricularia delicatula, the clubmosses Phylloglossum drummondii and Lycopodiella serpentina, and the ferns Todea barbara and Thelypteris confluens. Sydney golden wattle is an invasive pest species in the wetland, replacing native shrub species in dryer areas.

== Threats ==
Like many wetlands in Northland, Kaimaumau contains swamp kauri: wood thousands of years old preserved the anaerobic peat, one of the most expensive timbers in the world. Extracting and exporting swamp kauri is a large and lucrative trade: the timber sells for around NZ$5000 and up to NZ$10,000 per cubic metre, and 3636 cubic metres were exported in 2014. In 2014 Raymond Bird and Gary Beckham, two kauri extractors, were fined $50,000 each for digging for timber in "significant indigenous wetland" areas of Kaimaumau without a resource consent. They had diverted waterways and cleared vegetation for years in the protected wetland, defying Regional Council warnings and two Environment Court orders. Both were sentenced to community service, but filed for bankruptcy and paid no fines.

The iwi Ngāi Takoto plan to mine industrial compounds from peat in 404 ha of the Kaimaumau wetland, an area they describe as a "wattle farm" with "toxic soil". Although approved by the Northland Regional Council, The venture was criticised by the Conservation Minister Eugenie Sage for not allowing public submissions on the proposal, or notifying the Department of Conservation (DOC), who are responsible for the neighbouring wetland conservation area. She said it was a project "that belonged in the 1900s". The area to be mined contains numerous archaeological sites, and the consent to mine should not have been granted without an archaeological assessment and plan. There are also concerns that digging might damage the nearby scientific reserve and its underlying aquifer. DOC filed a High Court application in October 2018 to stop the mining from going ahead.

Seventeen avocado growers plan to plant 670 ha of avocados near Kaimaumau, and were granted rights to take over 2 million cubic metres of water a year from the Aupouri aquifer which supplies the wetland. The growers claimed avocado orchards would provide 70 seasonal jobs and millions of dollars of spending in the area. DOC have appealed the consent, citing concern over the possible drying of the wetland, and the lack of baseline monitoring to measure the effect of the increased water take. Any drying would allow the establishment of invasive wattle, a pest plant in the reserve. Five avocado growers began planting trees before the resource consent was granted, but although they were taking 10 times the permitted water allocation, none were prosecuted; all were given interim consents or abatement notices.

== See also ==
- Wetlands of New Zealand
- Environment of New Zealand
