= Lake Waikaramū =

Lake in the North Island of New Zealand

- Location within Northland Region
- Location: Northland Region, North Island
- Coordinates: 34.9168°S 173.2360°E
- Basin countries: New Zealand

Lake Waikaramū is a lake in the Northland Region of New Zealand.

== See also ==
- List of lakes in New Zealand
