= Aupōuri Peninsula =

Northernmost peninsula of New Zealand

- peninsula
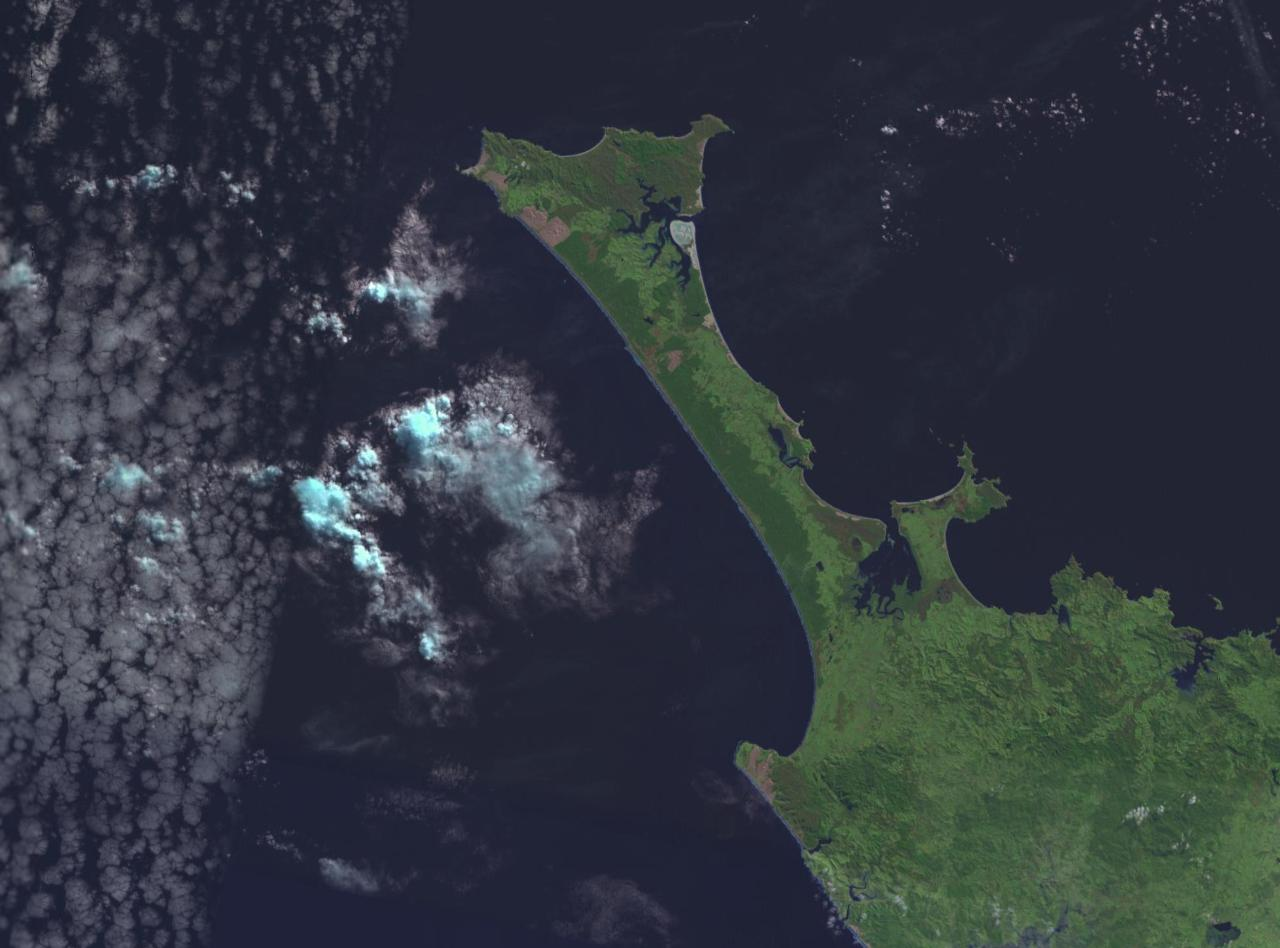
- NASA satellite photo of the Aupōuri Peninsula
- Interactive map of Aupōuri Peninsula
- Coordinates: 34°42′S 173°00′E
- Location: Northland Region, New Zealand

Area
  - Total: 1,103.19 km^{2} (425.94 sq mi)
- Population: 4,520
- Pop. date: June 2025

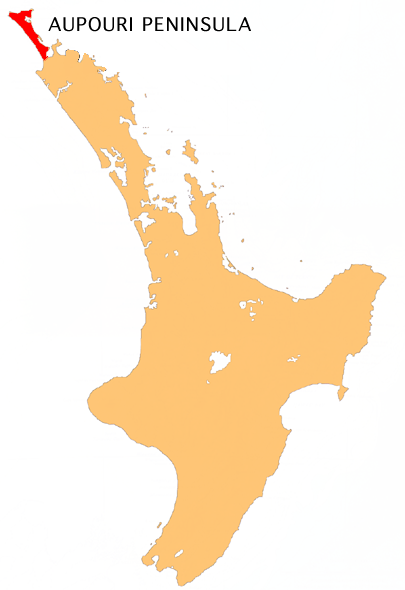
Location of Aupōuri Peninsula

The Aupōuri Peninsula is a tombolo at the northern tip of the North Island of New Zealand. It projects between the Tasman Sea to the west and the Pacific Ocean to the east. It constitutes the northern part of the Far North District, incorporating North Cape, Houhora and the northern half of Awanui.

== History ==
The original name of Te Aupouri was Ngati Ruanui whose ancestral canoe, Te Mamari, arrived in the Hokianga Harbour. They originally settled on the Harbour, but moved north to Pawerenga as their tribe grew. When a Ngāpuhi war party camped nearby their pa, they feared attack and set everything on the pa alight. This smoke screen enabled them to escape in their canoes and they rounded the cape to find the little valley Te Kao. They changed their name to Te Aupouri, meaning smokescreen to commemorate their escape.

The peninsula was an important location for the kauri gum digging trade, which peaked between 1890 and 1935. High quality kauri gum was found around the Parengarenga Harbour in the north, which led to the development of the Parenga Gumfield Company. After 1910, gum digging intensified in the southern half of the peninsula, as the poorer grade gum found in this region greatly increased in value.

== Overview ==
It is a peninsula on a peninsula, being part of the massive Northland Peninsula (also called the North Auckland Peninsula) which makes up nearly one twelfth of New Zealand's land area. Close to the northern town of Kaitaia, the Northland Peninsula suddenly narrows from a width of 60 kilometres to a mere 10 kilometres, a width which it maintains approximately for the last 100 kilometres of its thrust to the north.

At the base of the peninsula to the east is the natural inlet of the Rangaunu Harbour. Beyond this lies the Karikari Peninsula and the broad sweep of Doubtless Bay. The east coast of the peninsula is dominated by Rangaunu Bay in the south and Great Exhibition Bay in the north. Towards its northern tip is the natural inlet of Parengarenga Harbour, beyond which lies North Cape. Piwhane / Spirits Bay and Takapaukura / Tom Bowling Bay are located on northernmost of the land.

The peninsula's best-known feature is on the other coast: almost the entire west coast is the 88-kilometre long Ninety Mile Beach.

At its northern end, the peninsula widens to 30 kilometres. Here there are several capes that appear to be the northernmost point of New Zealand's main islands: Cape Maria van Diemen, North Cape, Cape Reinga, and the Surville Cliffs, which is the actual northernmost point by a few hundred metres, at latitude 34° 23' 47" South. Only a handful of islands in the Three Kings and Kermadec chains lie further north in New Zealand.

Although there are a number of settlements with over 100 people, including Te Hāpua, Te Kao, Pukenui and Kaimaumau, the peninsula is sparsely inhabited, with a population of approximately 3,900. For this reason, the area's roads are largely only metalled rather than being sealed. The main road (State Highway 1) is sealed, the final section completed in April 2010. Ninety Mile Beach is a designated highway, but most rental contracts include it in "prohibited roads". The nearest town to the capes at the tip of the peninsula is Kaitaia, 100 kilometres to the south.

It is named after Te Aupōuri, one of the Māori tribes that inhabits it.

== Demographics ==
The two statistical areas making up the Aupōuri Peninsula cover 1,103.19 km^{2} (425.94 sq mi) and had an estimated population of 4,520 as of June 2025, with a population density of 4 people per km^{2}. The statistical areas include Awanui to the south of the peninsula.

Historical population
Year	Pop.	±% p.a.
2006	3,348	—
2013	3,399	+0.22%
2018	3,912	+2.85%
2023	4,395	+2.36%

Aupōuri Peninsula had a population of 4,395 in the 2023 New Zealand census, an increase of 483 people (12.3%) since the 2018 census, and an increase of 996 people (29.3%) since the 2013 census. There were 2,235 males, 2,151 females and 12 people of other genders in 1,587 dwellings. 2.0% of people identified as LGBTIQ+. There were 915 people (20.8%) aged under 15 years, 705 (16.0%) aged 15 to 29, 1,896 (43.1%) aged 30 to 64, and 879 (20.0%) aged 65 or older.

People could identify as more than one ethnicity. The results were 61.5% European (Pākehā); 60.8% Māori; 5.8% Pasifika; 1.8% Asian; 0.2% Middle Eastern, Latin American and African New Zealanders (MELAA); and 2.7% other, which includes people giving their ethnicity as "New Zealander". English was spoken by 96.8%, Māori language by 17.7%, Samoan by 0.3% and other languages by 3.8%. No language could be spoken by 1.8% (e.g. too young to talk). New Zealand Sign Language was known by 0.5%. The percentage of people born overseas was 7.4, compared with 28.8% nationally.

Religious affiliations were 33.0% Christian, 0.1% Hindu, 0.1% Islam, 12.7% Māori religious beliefs, 0.1% Buddhist, 0.3% New Age, 0.1% Jewish, and 0.5% other religions. People who answered that they had no religion were 45.1%, and 8.3% of people did not answer the census question.

Of those at least 15 years old, 324 (9.3%) people had a bachelor's or higher degree, 2,034 (58.4%) had a post-high school certificate or diploma, and 1,038 (29.8%) people exclusively held high school qualifications. 147 people (4.2%) earned over $100,000 compared to 12.1% nationally. The employment status of those at least 15 was that 1,467 (42.2%) people were employed full-time, 495 (14.2%) were part-time, and 147 (4.2%) were unemployed.

Individual statistical areas
Name	Area (km^{2})	Population	Density (per km^{2})	Dwellings	Median age	Median income
North Cape	829.19	1,905	2.30	711	45.6 years	$27,400
Rangaunu Harbour	274.00	2,490	9.09	876	40.2 years	$29,900
New Zealand					38.1 years	$41,500

== Aupōuri Aquifer ==
The Aupōuri Aquifer extends along the whole length of Te Oneroa-a-Tōhē / Ninety Mile Beach, and includes lowlying land between Waimanoni and Ahipara, covering a total land area of 75,322 hectares. Groundwater levels are monitored and water allocation limits are set by Northland Regional Council. Resource consents for water takes include conditions for monitoring bores to observe water levels and any saltwater intrusion.

There are a number of small lakes in the Aupōuri Peninsula, such as Lake Waiparera, Lake Heather, Lake Ngatu, and Lake Rotoroa. There is a possibility to use these as "window lakes" presenting an extension of the groundwater table ("window lakes" would be affected by groundwater pumping due to the direct hydraulically connection with the aquifer), there is however, little data available on which to base a conclusion.

Use of the aquifer for the avocado industry has caused concerns for the public regarding water security for local communities, and the potential environmental impact on the nearby Kaimaumau wetland.
