= Hyalite Reservoir =

Reservoir in Gallatin County, Montana

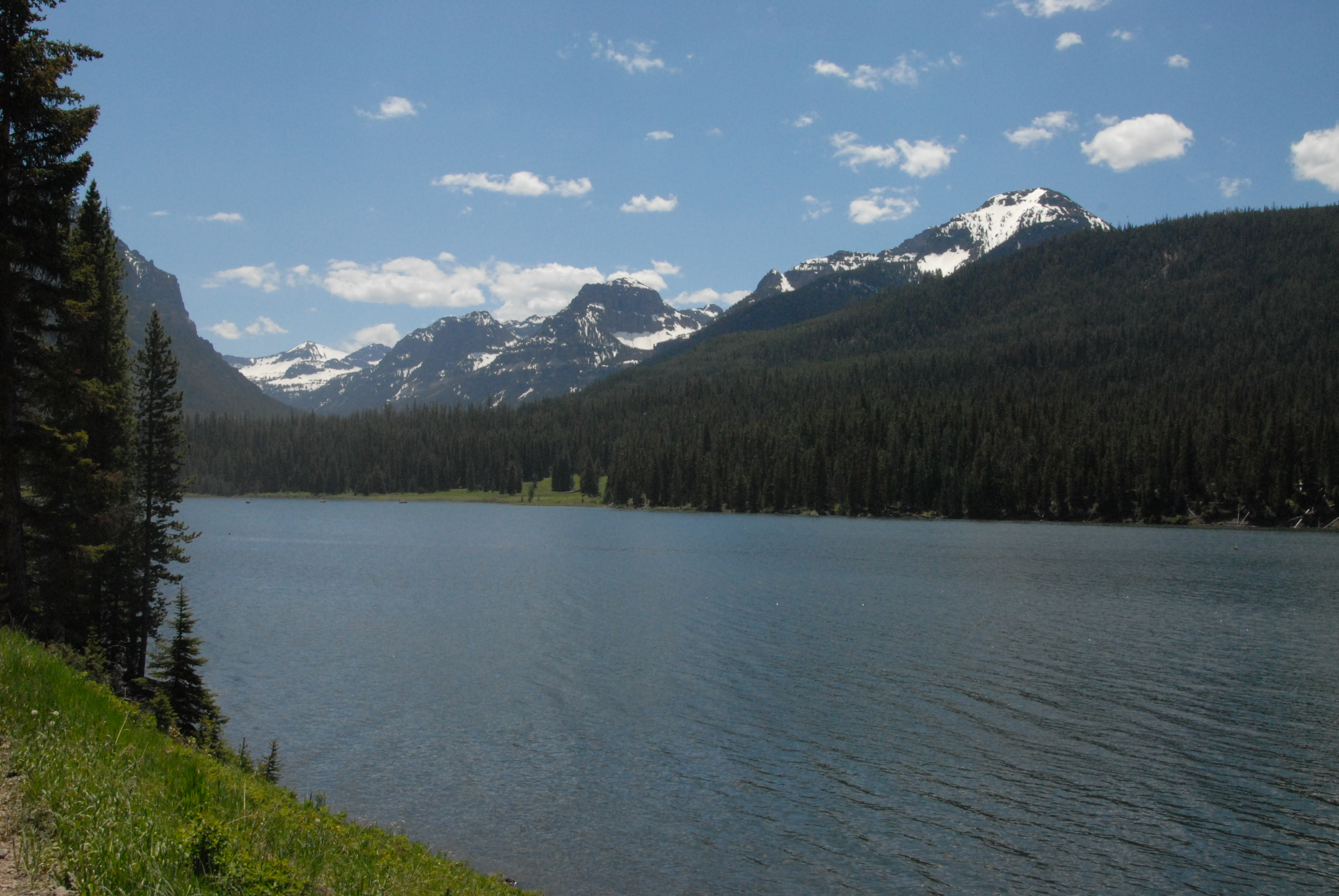
- Hyalite Reservoir

- Location within Montana Location within the United States
- Location: Gallatin County, Montana, United States
- Coordinates: 45.4807°N 110.9676°W
- Primary inflows: Hyalite Creek
- Primary outflows: Hyalite Creek
- Basin countries: United States
- Max. length: 1.5 miles (2.4 km)
- Max. width: .3 miles (0.48 km)
- Surface area: 490 acres (200 ha)
- Max. depth: 126 ft (38 m)
- Water volume: 4.43614×10^{+8} cubic feet (1.25617×10^{7} m^{3})
- Surface elevation: 6,699 ft (2,042 m)

Hyalite Reservoir is a reservoir located in southwest Montana, formed by Middle Creek Dam on Hyalite Creek. The lake is situated in Hyalite Canyon at an elevation of 6,699 ft (2,042 m), about 12 miles (19 km) south of Bozeman, Montana and 25 miles (40 km) north of Yellowstone National Park. It was originally built in the 1940s and was expanded to its current size in 1993. Originally known as Middle Creek Reservoir, the name was changed in the late 1960s.

== Geography ==
Hyalite Reservoir is located in the southwest corner of the state of Montana, approximately 12 miles (19 km) south of Bozeman and 10.5 miles (16.9 km) up Hyalite Canyon. The lake sits at the northern end of the Gallatin Range, just south of the Gallatin Valley.

At normal full pool, the lake has a volume of 4.43614×10^{+8} cubic feet (1.25617×10^{7} m^{3}) and an area of 206 acres (83 ha), which experiences high seasonal variation. When at maximum capacity, the lake is approximately 1.5 miles (2.4 km) miles long and .3 miles (0.48 km) wide. The reservoir reaches depths of 126 feet (38 m).

== Recreation ==
Hyalite Reservoir and the surrounding area offer many recreational activities including camping, fishing, boating, and hiking. There are two campgrounds, Chisolm and Hood Creek. Motorized boating is allowed on Hyalite Reservoir with a "no wake" rule for the entire reservoir.
