= Heather Lake (Montana) =

Lake in Gallatin County, Montana

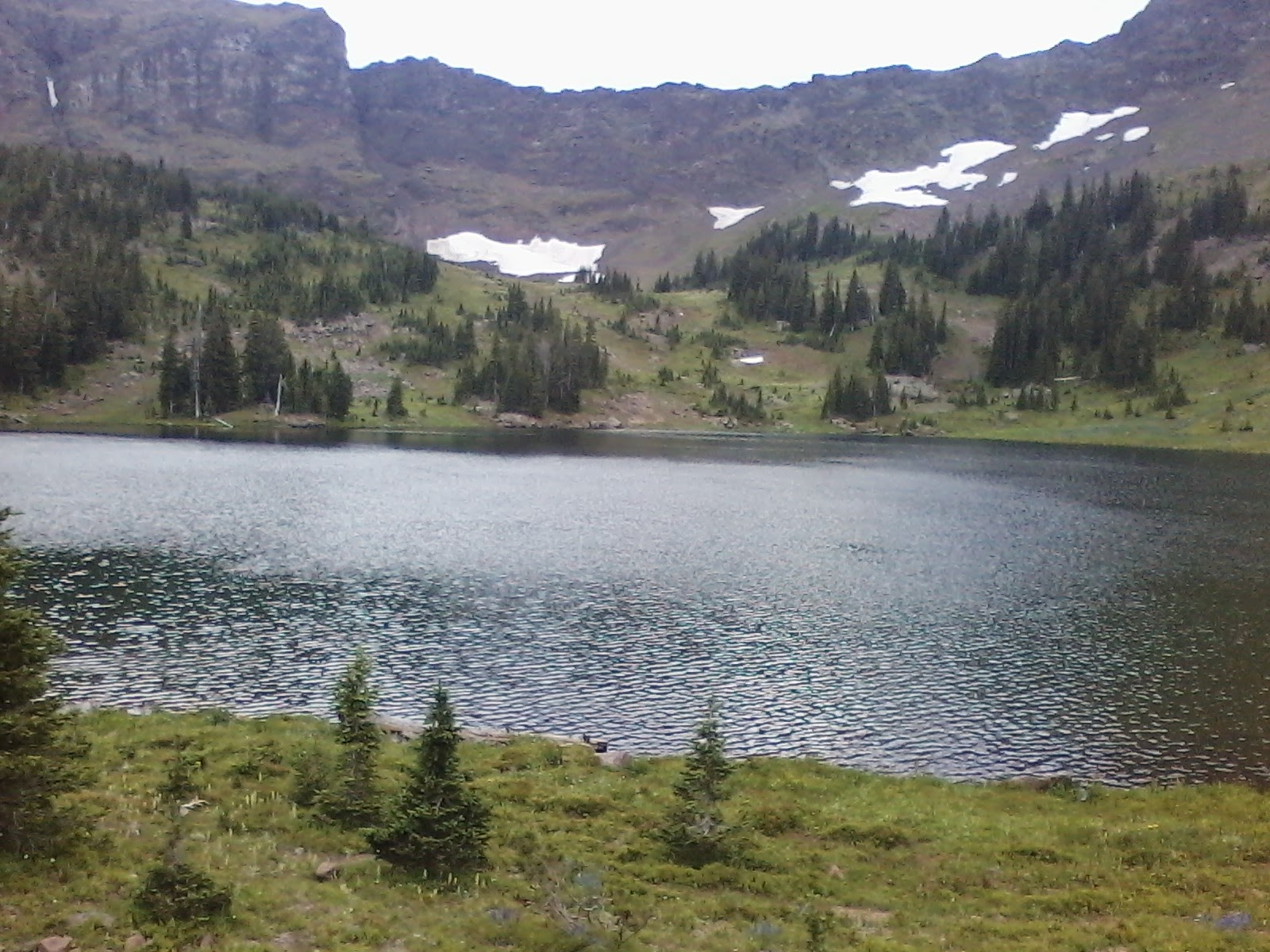

- Location within Montana Location within the United States
- Location: Gallatin County, Montana
- Coordinates: 45°24′35″N 110°56′10″W
- Type: Lake
- Primary inflows: Gallatin Range
- Primary outflows: East Fork Hyalite Creek
- Basin countries: United States
- Surface area: 14 acres (5.7 ha)
- Surface elevation: 9,186 ft (2,800 m)

Heather Lake is a lake in Gallatin County, Montana in the Gallatin Range in south central Montana. It is located at the head of the East Fork of Hyalite Creek in the Gallatin National Forest and sits at an elevation of 9,186 ft (2,800 m).
