= Mount Pilchuck =

Mountain in Washington state

- bəlalgʷəʔ (Lushootseed)
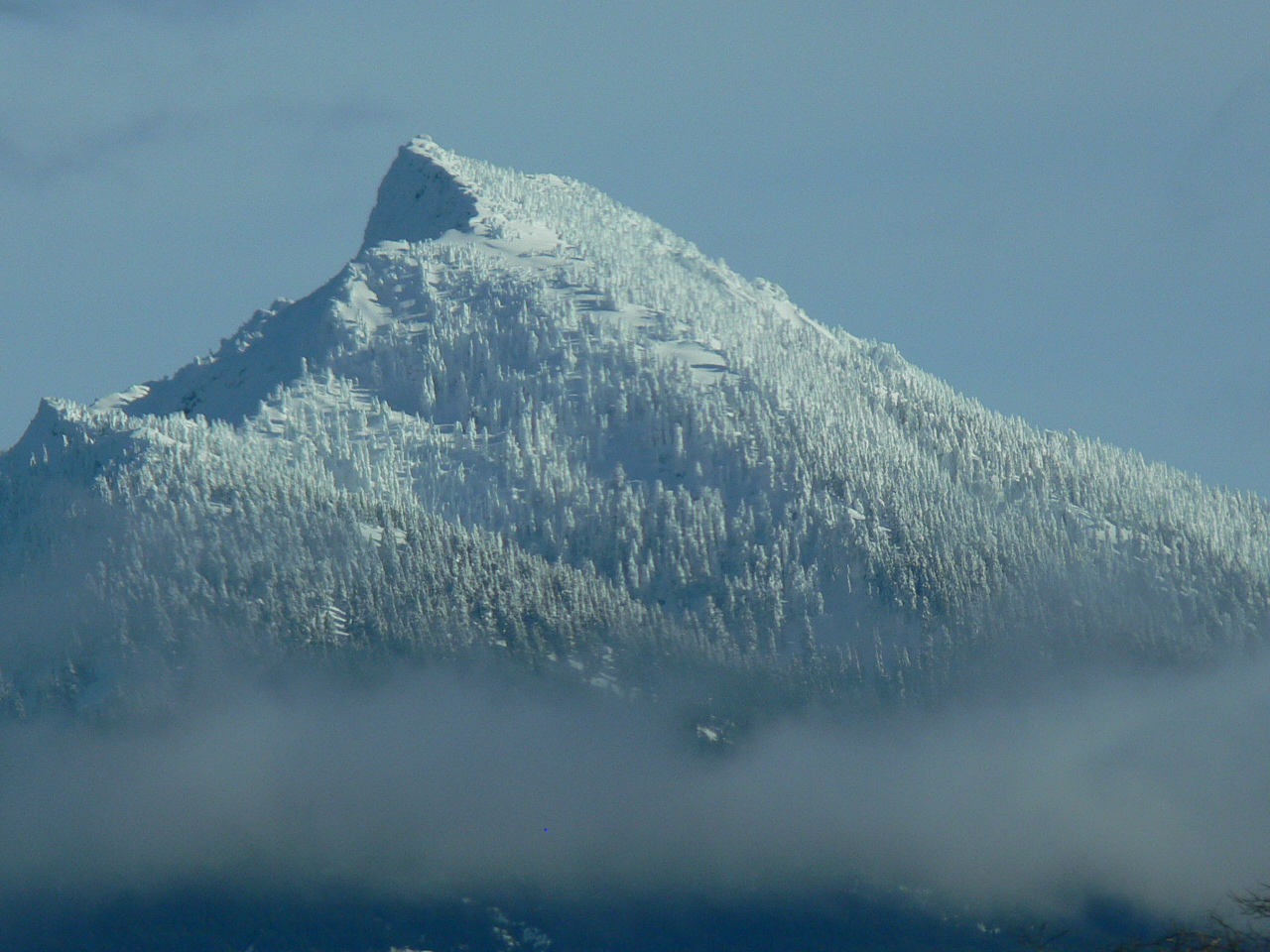
- Mount Pilchuck in winter

Highest point
- Elevation: 5,344 ft (1,629 m) NAVD 88
- Prominence: 2,860 ft (870 m)
- Coordinates: 48°03′28.7″N 121°47′52.1″W

Geography
- Location: Snohomish County, Washington, U.S.
- Parent range: Cascades
- Topo map: Mallardy Ridge

Mount Pilchuck (Lushootseed: bəlalgʷəʔ) is a mountain located in Snohomish County, Washington. It is 37 miles (60 km) northeast of Seattle. It is part of the Cascade Range.

Mount Pilchuck is located within Mount Pilchuck State Park, but the area surrounding the mountain, including the trailhead, are within the Mount Baker-Snoqualmie National Forest. Under agreement, the trail leading to the summit is wholly maintained by the United States Forest Service (USFS), even though it is within a state park. During the winter off-season, the USFS closes the access road leading to the mountain beyond the Heather Lake trailhead.

This is one of the most popular trails in the region due to easy access, and panoramic views of the Cascade range to the east, and Puget Sound to the west.

At Mount Pilchuck's summit is an old fire lookout tower, now used as shelter for hikers. This former lookout is jointly maintained by Washington State Parks and the Everett branch of The Mountaineers.

Some years the trail to the summit is still covered with snow until late in the summer.

== Etymology ==
The name for the mountain comes from Chinook Jargon, a trade language widely used in the area in the 19th century. It is a combination of two words: pʰil, meaning "red," and tsəqw, meaning "water" or "river." The name possibly comes from the fact that many of the rivers that come from the mountain are rich in iron, which can cause the water to look orangish-red.

The Lushootseed word for the mountain means "navel." It has also been recorded as bəlalwəʔ and bəlawəʔ.

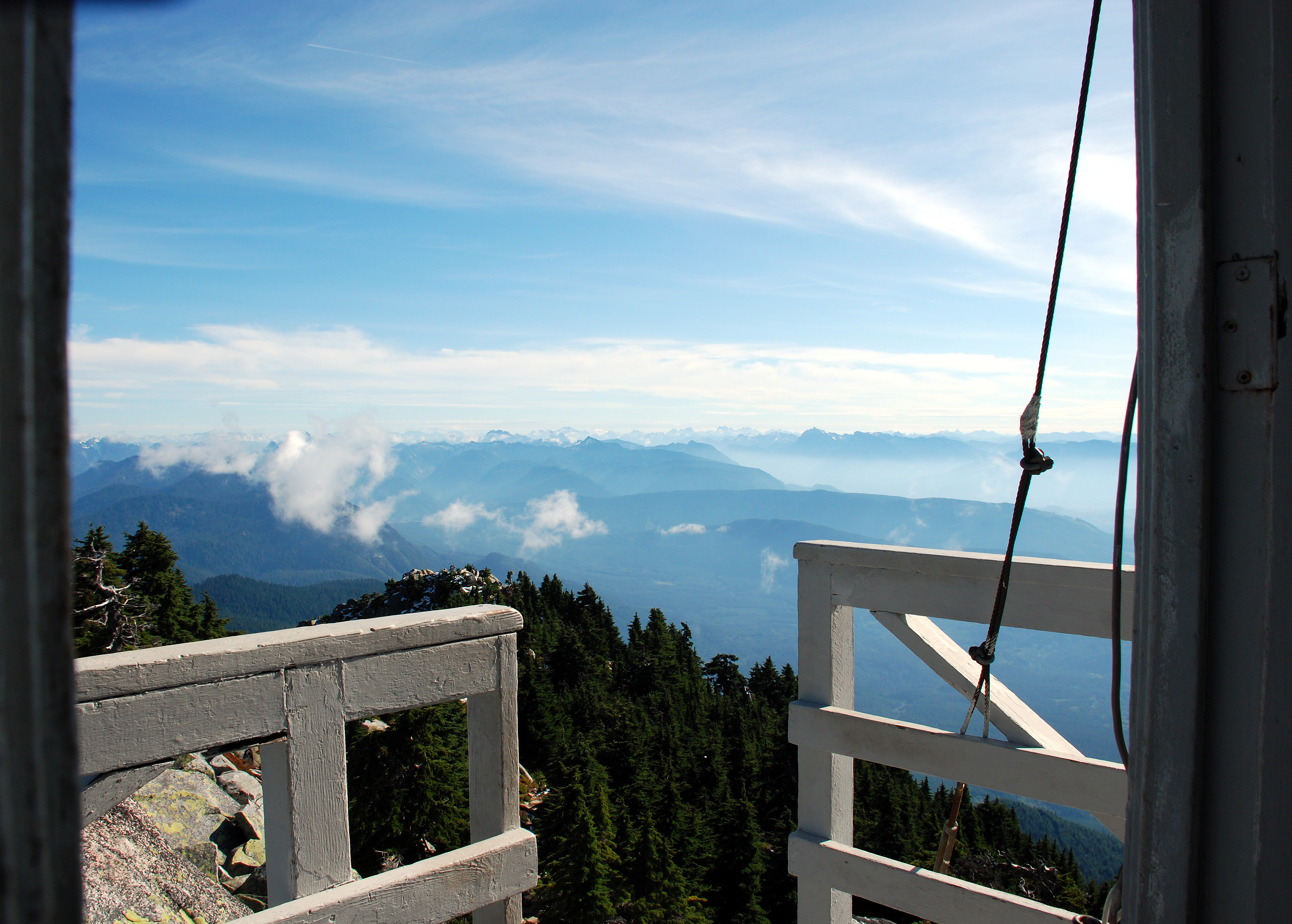
View as seen from Mount Pilchuck's fire lookout
