= Lake Ngatu =

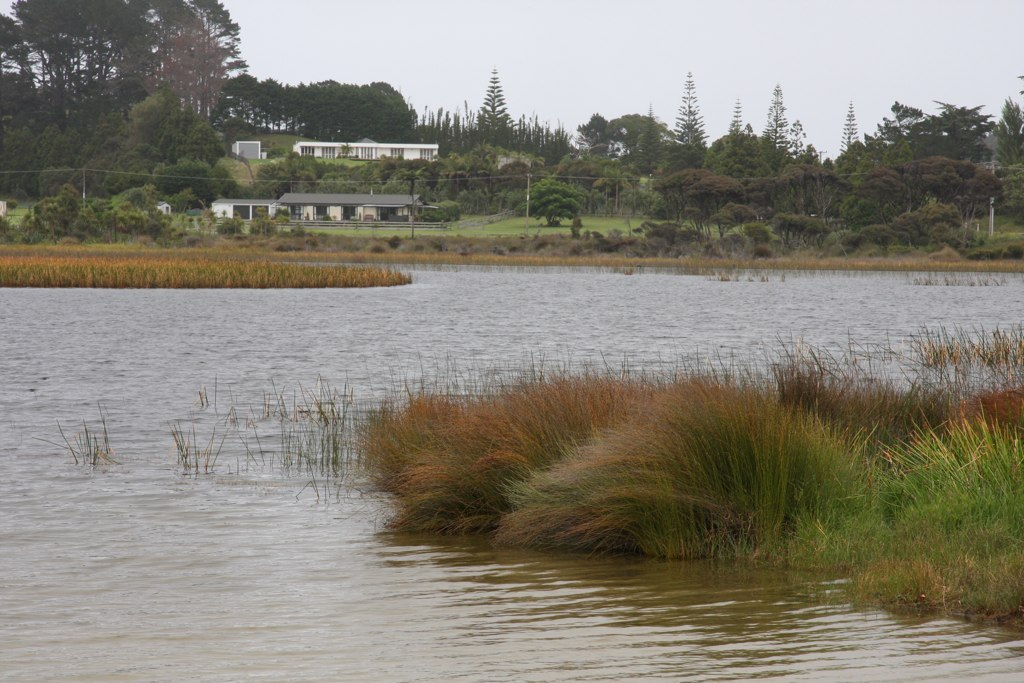
- Lake Ngatu

- Location within Northland Region
- Location: Northland Region, North Island
- Coordinates: 35.032°S 173.198°E
- Type: Class 1 Perched dune lake
- Catchment area: 177.9 hectares (440 acres)
- Basin countries: New Zealand
- Surface area: 55.54 hectares (137.2 acres)
- Average depth: 2.67 metres (8 ft 9 in)
- Max. depth: 6.26 metres (20.5 ft)
- Water volume: 1,548,165.50 cubic metres (54,672,949 cu ft)
- Residence time: 1.565 years

Lake Ngatu is a dune lake in the Northland Region of New Zealand. It is located to the northwest of Awanui, near Waipapakauri.

Lake Ngatu has no inlets or outlets. The lake catchment is primarily manuka/kanuka scrub and fenced pasture. There are houses overlooking the lake.

== Recreation ==
Lake Ngatu is a popular recreation area, and is easily accessed via West Coast Road and Sweetwater Road. There is a 4-kilometre (2.5 mi) loop walking track around the perimeter of the lake.

== Water quality and ecology ==
The water quality of Lake Ngatu has been highlighted in recent times, with particular concerns of a summer algal bloom threat.

The lake is monitored by Northland Regional Council, and the environmental information can be viewed on the LAWA website.

== See also ==
- List of lakes in New Zealand
