= Awanui =

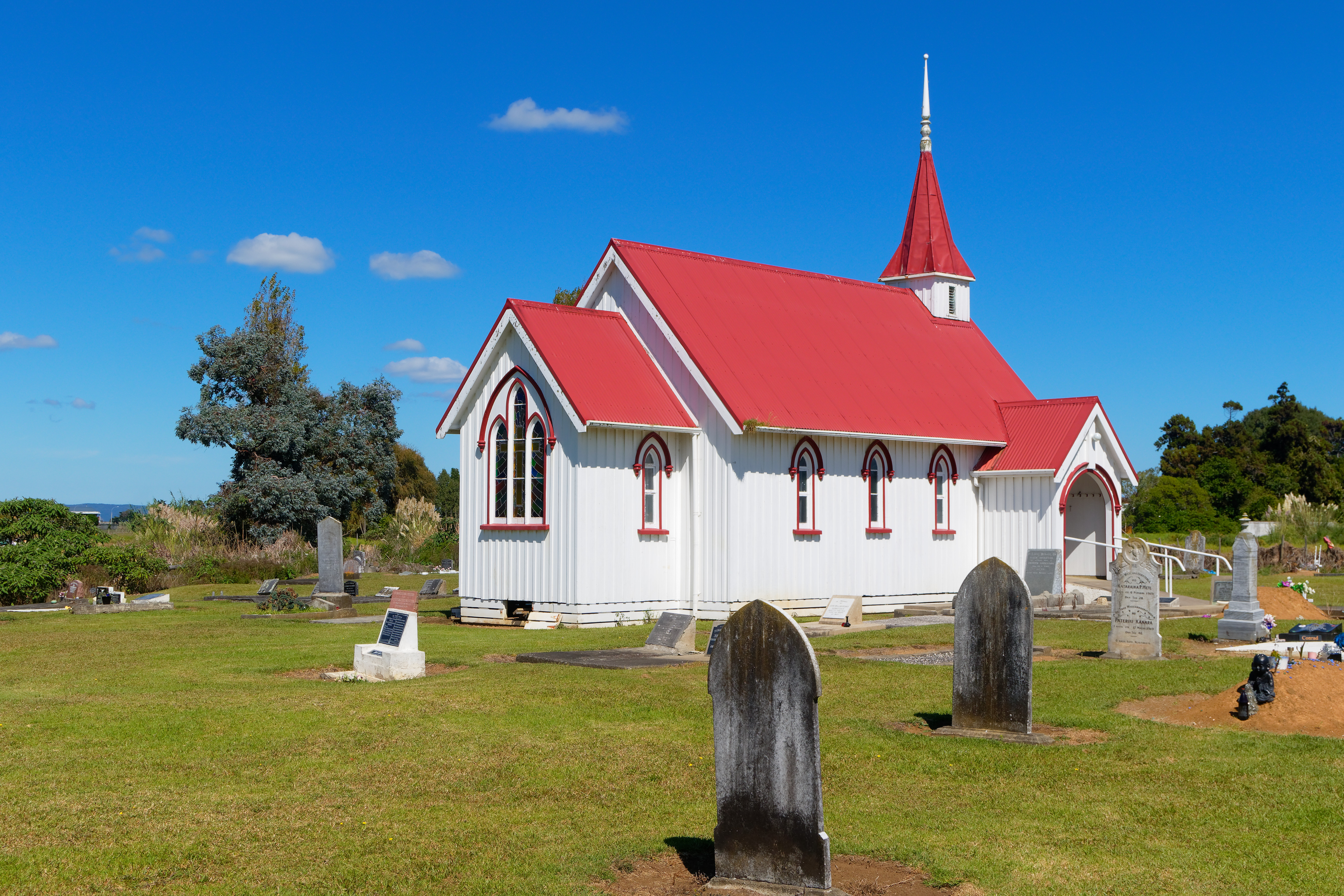
- St Josephs Church
- Interactive map of Awanui
- Coordinates: 35°2′52″S 173°15′22″E
- Country: New Zealand
- Region: Northland Region
- District: Far North District
- Ward: Te Hiku
- Community: Te Hiku
- Subdivision: Whatuwhiwhi
- Electorates: Northland; Te Tai Tokerau

Government
  - Territorial Authority: Far North District Council
  - Regional council: Northland Regional Council
  - Mayor of Far North: Moko Tepania
  - Northland MP: Grant McCallum
  - Te Tai Tokerau MP: TBD

Area
  - Total: 0.96 km^{2} (0.37 sq mi)

Population (June 2025)
  - Total: 420
  - Density: 440/km^{2} (1,100/sq mi)
- Postcode: 0486

Awanui is an historical river port in the far north of New Zealand, on the banks of the Awanui River just before it flows into Rangaunu Bay. Awanui lies at the south end of the Aupouri Peninsula in the Far North District Council of the Northland Region, approximately 7 km north of Kaitaia. The river port has ceased operation and a recreational wharf is located at Unahi, on the shore of Rangaunu Bay, approximately 3 km north of the township. The traditional name of Awanui was Kaiwaka and Awanui proper refers to the "River at Kaiwaka". Awanui had an estimated population of 420 as of June 2025.

For much of the 20th century, Awanui was dominated by the Kaitaia Co-operative Dairy Factory, located immediately north of the township. The factory was constructed in 1926, which included the current wharf structure at Unahi. In 1986, the Kaitaia Co-operative merged with the neighbouring Northland Dairy Company. A sequence of such mergers would eventually form Fonterra. Given the distance away from markets, together with improved farming technology and transportation methods, these mergers eventually forced the factory at Awanui to close by the early 1990s. Dairy farms remain active in the area, although smaller, with milk being transported to the Kauri Dairy Factory just north of Whangārei, approximately 100 km south.

In the 1920s, kauri timber and gum from Kaitaia moved to the coast through Awanui.

State Highway 1 and 10 intersect at Awanui. Waiharara is 16 km to the north west, Kaingaroa is about 6 km to the north east, and Kaitaia is 7 km south.

== History and culture ==
=== Subritzky family ===
Early in 1868, John Anton Subritzky and his family sold up their business interests in Maldon, Australia and sailed to New Zealand aboard the barquentine Prince Alfred, arriving first in the Port of Auckland, and then sailing aboard a family schooner to Houhora and the Mount Camel Station, a large estate owned by his older brothers Captain Ludolph Johann and Heinrich Wilhelm.

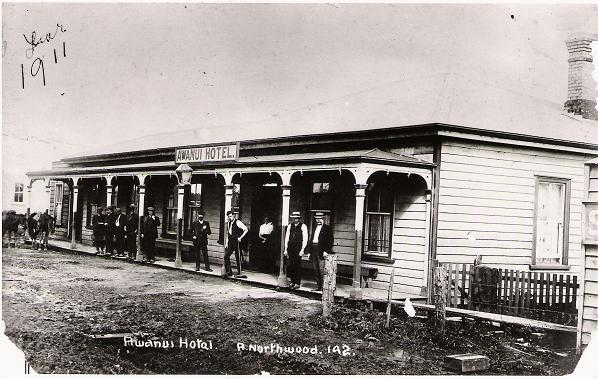

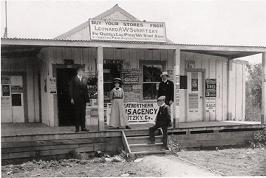

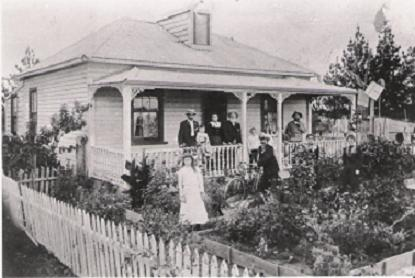

Within a short time the Subritzky family owned or controlled almost all of the North from Awanui northward - the town of Awanui was built by the Subritzkys and their extended family, both Pakeha and Maori. The hub of the Subritzky family operations was the Mount Camel Station, and their influence on the Far North for the next fifty years stretched far and wide. They imported cattle and developed their own breed of shorthorn. They developed a shipping link with Auckland, transporting many of the early pioneering families into the northern districts. The Subritzkys also established flax mills and began processing fibres for sales and export. Then came the days of the gum diggers, and for the rest of the 1800s and well into the 1900s it was the gum trade which provided much of the prosperity in Northland.

=== Elingamite tragedy ===
On the 5 November 1902, the steamer Elingamite had sailed from Sydney bound for Auckland. On the morning of the 9th the ship encountered a dense fog and the engines were slowed to half speed. The Elingamite was a large inter-colonial passenger steamer, and carried nearly two hundred people.

A ship's look-out managed to cry out "Breakers ahead!", but it was too late, and the ship ploughed on straight ahead and was broken on the rocks of West King Island. Within minutes the ship took on a large volume of water. There were six lifeboats on board and they were immediately launched. The captain stayed with his ship until she was fully under, when he was washed into the sea and picked up by one of the lifeboats.

Under the command of the Executive Officer L. Berkett, Number Two lifeboat struck out to find help. He took the lifeboat round North Cape and down the east coast towards Houhora. They landed just north of Mount Camel, and several of the party stumbled overland through the scrub to the Houhora Hotel to raise the alarm. The Evans family sent a telegram to Auckland and a rescue fleet was raised. HMS Penguin, SS Omapere, and SS Clansman were despatched from Auckland and took part in the search and rescue, as did the auxiliary schooner of the Subritzky fleet, the Greyhound.

Meanwhile, at Houhora the locals took things into their own hands. They despatched a rider to Awanui to alert the crew of the Greyhound, which was known to be in port. They also knew that a passenger ship, the Zealandia, was sailing up the coast en route to Australia and would soon be passing Mount Camel. Members of the Wagener, Northwood and McIntosh families put to sea in Peter McIntosh's whaleboat and succeeded in getting the Zealandia to hove to. They informed the captain and he immediately got under way at all speed, however, leaving behind a very exhausted whaleboat crew to their own devices some 25 miles out to sea. (Note: The whaleboat used by the Houhora families in this rescue now rests in the Auckland War Memorial Museum.)

On the evening of the 10 November 1902, Captain Alfred Subritzky, master of the Greyhound, was asleep at his home in Awanui, and his ship tied up alongside the Subritzky wharf. He was awoken by the sound of hoofbeats, a man galloping on a horse calling his name "Captain Subritzky!" The rider drew up outside the house, having ridden hard down from Houhora, all the while yelling "The Elingamite's gone down! The Elingamite's gone down!" "Where's she gone down son?" asked Captain Subritzky. "She hit the Three Kings, sir," he replied.

After checking his pocket watch, Captain Subritzky realised that the tides were all wrong and the bar at the harbour entrance was hardly covered by the incoming sea. He hurried to the Greyhound, roused the crew and made ready for sea wearing sea-boots and pyjamas. They poled down the Awanui River, then ran up all available canvas - the ship still had to clear the bar. The Greyhound raced at the bar with the auxiliary engine running and the sails set "Goose Wing" fashion, one boom on the port beam, one boom on the starboard beam and the wind blowing from directly astern. The bow section cleared and then there was a terrific thump as the keel struck the bar, but the vessel shuddered her way over then ploughed northward and into the open sea. The race for the survivors was on.

The Three Kings Islands are located at the very tip of the North Island. The Greyhound was the first ship to commence the search and lifted three dead men from the water, later identified from documents in their clothing as Messer's Green, Parker and C. Johnson. Captain Subritzky wanted to hand the bodies over to the SS Clansman and continue searching further out to sea. However, the master of the Clansman refused to take possession of them, and so the Greyhound was forced to return to Awanui due to the decaying of the remains. The three deceased were buried in an unmarked grave at Saint Joseph's churchyard in Awanui by the crew of the Greyhound and the Reverend Merton.

=== World War II ===
A Royal New Zealand Air Force aerodrome and base was located nearby at Waipapakauri during World War II. At the end of hostilities in 1945, the airbase was closed and facilities abandoned, the far more suitable Kaitaia Airport nearby being developed with a paved runway.

=== Marae ===
Awanui has two marae affiliated with Ngāi Takoto: Mahimaru Marae and Te Whakamomoringa meeting house and Waimanoni Marae and Wikitoria meeting house.

== Demographics ==
Statistics New Zealand describes Awanui as a rural settlement. It covers 0.96 km^{2} (0.37 sq mi) and had an estimated population of 420 as of June 2025, with a population density of 438 people per km^{2}. Awanui is part of the larger Rangaunu Harbour statistical area.

Historical population
Year	Pop.	±% p.a.
2006	351	—
2013	339	−0.50%
2018	405	+3.62%
2023	345	−3.16%

Awanui had a population of 345 in the 2023 New Zealand census, a decrease of 60 people (−14.8%) since the 2018 census, and an increase of 6 people (1.8%) since the 2013 census. There were 165 males, 177 females and 3 people of other genders in 126 dwellings. 3.5% of people identified as LGBTIQ+. The median age was 37.0 years (compared with 38.1 years nationally). There were 75 people (21.7%) aged under 15 years, 57 (16.5%) aged 15 to 29, 147 (42.6%) aged 30 to 64, and 60 (17.4%) aged 65 or older.

People could identify as more than one ethnicity. The results were 53.0% European (Pākehā), 71.3% Māori, 6.1% Pasifika, 2.6% Asian, and 1.7% other, which includes people giving their ethnicity as "New Zealander". English was spoken by 94.8%, Māori language by 13.0%, and other languages by 1.7%. No language could be spoken by 2.6% (e.g. too young to talk). New Zealand Sign Language was known by 0.9%. The percentage of people born overseas was 6.1, compared with 28.8% nationally.

Religious affiliations were 36.5% Christian, 1.7% Hindu, and 13.0% Māori religious beliefs. People who answered that they had no religion were 38.3%, and 9.6% of people did not answer the census question.

Of those at least 15 years old, 21 (7.8%) people had a bachelor's or higher degree, 141 (52.2%) had a post-high school certificate or diploma, and 99 (36.7%) people exclusively held high school qualifications. The median income was $34,700, compared with $41,500 nationally. 9 people (3.3%) earned over $100,000 compared to 12.1% nationally. The employment status of those at least 15 was that 132 (48.9%) people were employed full-time, 36 (13.3%) were part-time, and 12 (4.4%) were unemployed.

== Education ==
Awanui School is a contributing primary (years 1-6) school with a roll of 44 students as of July 2026. Awanui School first opened in 1872 as a native school, and moved to its current site in 1915.

Te Rangi Āniwaniwa is a composite school serving years 1-15, with a roll of 180 students as of July 2026. Te Rangi Āniwaniwa opened in 1993, and teaches entirely in the Māori language.

Both schools are coeducational.
