= Northland Regional Council =

Regional council in New Zealand

Northland Regional Council Te Kaunihera ā rohe o Te Taitokerau
- Brand logo

Type
- Type: Regional council of Northland Region
- Term limits: None

History
- Established: 1 November 1989; 36 years ago
- Preceded by: Northland United Council
- New session started: 18 October 2025

Leadership
- Chair: Pita Tipene, Ind since 5 November 2025
- Deputy: Jack Craw, Ind. since 5 November 2025
- CEO: Jonathan Gibbard since 1 October 2022

Structure
- Seats: 9
- Political groups: Independent (9); Te Pāti Māori (1)
- Length of term: 3 years, renewable

Elections
- Voting system: First-past-the-post
- First election: 14 October 1989
- Last election: 11 October 2025
- Next election: 2028

Meeting place
- 36 Water Street, Whangārei

Website
- nrc.govt.nz

Northland Regional Council (abbr. NRC; Māori: Te Kaunihera ā rohe o Te Taitokerau) is the regional authority for the Northland Region of New Zealand. The current entity has existed since 1989.

The governing body of the council has nine councillors, one of whom is elected as chair by their fellow members (currently Pita Tipene since November 2025).

== Governing body ==
=== Chair ===
- November 2023: Geoff Crawford; deputy Tui Shortland
- November 2025: Pita Tipene; deputy Jack Craw

=== Current composition ===
The current members of the governing body of council are:

Councillor	Affiliation (Note: Per 2025 Northland Regional Council election unless otherwise specified)	Constituency	In office since
Pita Tipene (Chair)	Independent	Te Raki Māori	18 October 2025
Jack Craw (Deputy)	Independent	Whangārei Central general	13 October 2016
Joe Carr	Independent	Far North general	18 October 2007
Colin Kitchen	Independent	Bay of Islands-Whangaroa general	18 October 2025
John Blackwell	Independent	Kaipara general	14 October 2022
Amy MacDonald	Independent	Coastal Central general	17 October 2019
John Hunt	Independent	Coastal South general	18 October 2025
Geoff Crawford	Independent	Whangārei Central general	14 October 2016
Arama Morunga	Te Pāti Māori	Te Raki Māori	18 October 2025

== Constituencies ==
Constituencies

The council has the following constituencies for electoral representation purposes:

1. Far North general
2. Bay of Islands-Whangaroa general
3. Kaipara general
4. Mid North general
5. Coastal Central general
6. Coastal South general
7. Whangārei Central general
8. Te Raki Māori

== Elections ==
=== List ===
- 1989
- 1992
- 1995
- 1998
- 2001
- 2004
- 2007
- 2010
- 2013
- 2016
- 2019
- 2022
- 2025
