= List of lagoons of New Zealand =

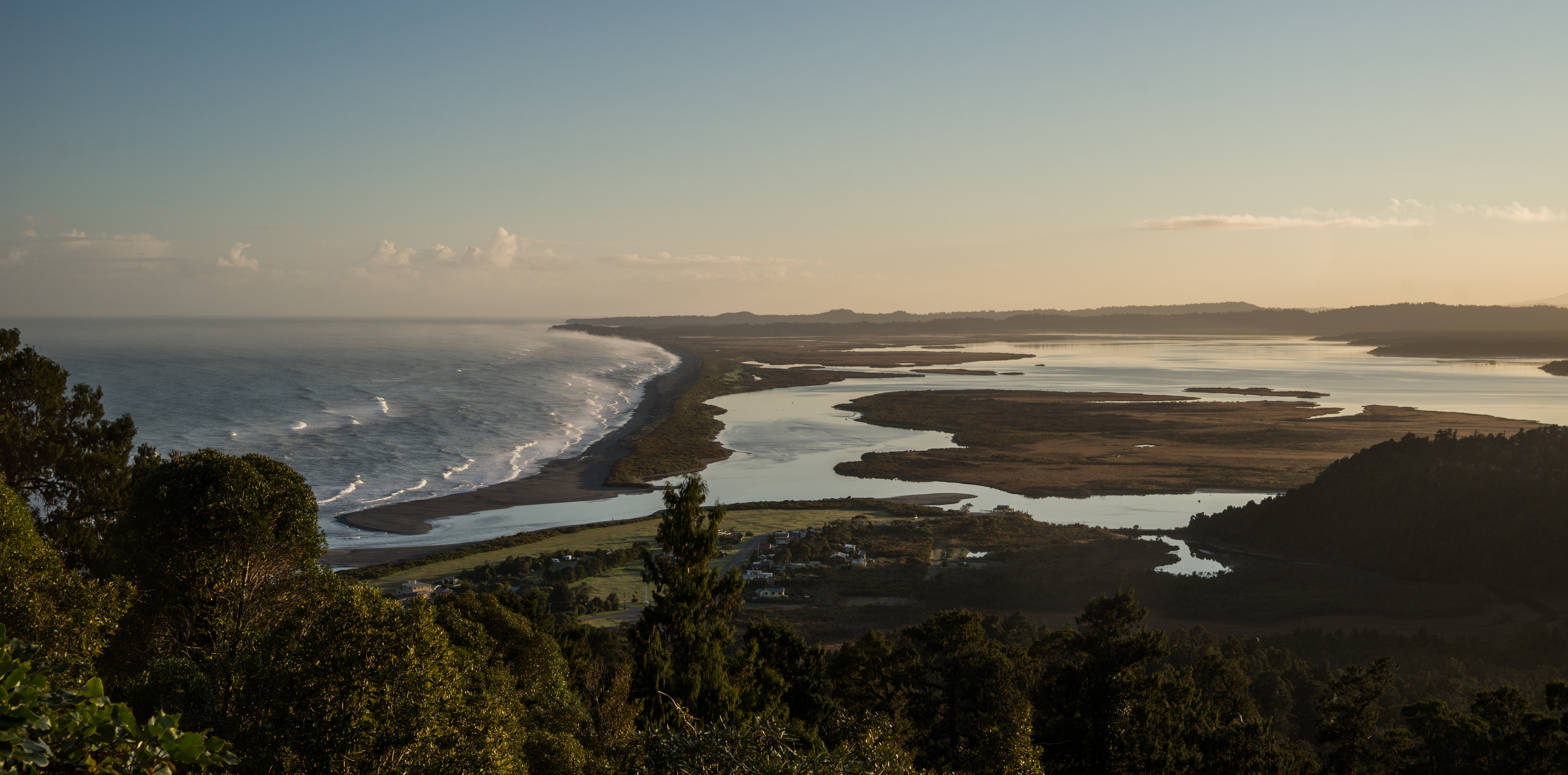
Ōkārito Lagoon, South Island

This is a list of lagoons of New Zealand.

== Lagoons ==
Lagoon	Location	Region	Area (ha)	Outflow	Coordinates
Ahuriri Lagoon (former lagoon)‡	Napier	Hawke's Bay	4,000	Pacific Ocean	39°28′00″S 176°52′00″E
Amberley Beach Lagoon	Hurunui District	Canterbury		Pacific Ocean	43°10′05″S 172°47′00″E
Andersons Lagoon	Near Palmerston	Otago		Pacific Ocean	45°30′30″S 170°46′45″E
Aotea Lagoon	Porirua	Wellington	5	Tasman Sea	41°07′12″S 174°51′25″E
Big Lagoon (Marlborough)	Cloudy Bay	Marlborough	800	Pacific Ocean	41°33′00″S 174°06′00″E
Big Lagoon (Southland)	Riverton / Aparima	Southland	32	Foveaux Strait	46°21′10″S 168°10′30″E
Bluff Harbour	Bluff	Southland		Foveaux Strait	46°35′30″S 168°20′00″E
Brooklands Lagoon	Waimakariri River mouth	Canterbury	270	Pacific Ocean	43°24′50″S 172°42′25″E
Lake Brunton	Awarua Plain	Southland	25	Pacific Ocean	46°39′10″S 168°53′20″E
Chandlers Lagoon	Section of Big Lagoon	Marlborough		Pacific Ocean	41°33′05″S 174°04′05″E
Coopers Lagoon / Muriwai	Mid-Canterbury	Canterbury	2	Pacific Ocean	43°51′30″S 172°18′00″E
Lake Ellesmere / Te Waihora	Selwyn River mouth	Canterbury	19,781	Pacific Ocean	43°48′00″S 172°25′00″E
Five Mile Lagoon	Westland District	West Coast		Tasman Sea	43°16′35″S 170°05′20″E
Glenorchy Lagoon	Central Otago	Otago		Lake Wakatipu	44°50′40″S 168°23′30″E
Lake Forsyth / Waiwera	Banks Peninsula	Canterbury	628	Pacific Ocean	43°48′20″S 172°44′25″E
Lake Grassmere / Kapara Te Hau	Clifford Bay	Marlborough	1,700	Pacific Ocean	41°44′00″S 174°10′00″E
Hawksbury Lagoon	Waikouaiti	Otago	51	Pacific Ocean	45°36′20″S 170°40′25″E
Hikimutu Lagoon	Westland District	West Coast		Tasman Sea	43°03′10″S 170°24′11″E
Kaikorai Lagoon	Waldronville	Otago	94	Pacific Ocean	45°55′00″S 170°23′50″E
Kaituna Lagoon	Section of Lake Ellesmere / Te Waihora	Canterbury		Lake Ellesmere / Te Waihora	43°47′40″S 172°38′40″E
Kiriwai Lagoon	Arm of Lake Ōnoke	Wellington		Lake Ōnoke	41°22′55″S 175°06′10″E
Lake Kohangapiripiri	Pencarrow Head	Wellington	11	Cook Strait	41°21′30″S 174°51′30″E
Lake Kohangatera	Pencarrow Head	Wellington	17	Cook Strait	41°22′00″S 174°52′00″E
Leithfield Beach Lagoon	Hurunui District	Canterbury		Pacific Ocean	43°12′28″S 172°45′24″E
Māngere Lagoon	Manukau Harbour	Auckland		Manukau Harbour	36°57′25″S 174°46′40″E
Matatā Lagoon	Matatā	Bay of Plenty		Bay of Plenty	37°53′18″S 176°45′50″E
Maungawhio Lagoon	Māhia Peninsula	Hawke's Bay	96	Pacific Ocean	39°04′00″S 177°53′00″E
Mimimoto Lagoon	Hurunui District	Canterbury		Pacific Ocean	43°10′49″S 172°46′28″E
Moutere Inlet	Motueka	Tasman District	764	Tasman Bay / Te Tai-o-Aorere	41°10′00″S 173°02′00″E
Ngamotu Lagoon	Wairoa	Hawke's Bay		Pacific Ocean	39°03′30″S 177°26′30″E
New River Estuary	Invercargill	Southland	4,100	Foveaux Strait	46°28′30″S 168°20′00″E
Normanby Lagoon	Normanby	Canterbury		Pacific Ocean	44°27′15″S 171°14′55″E
Ogilvie Lagoon	Westland District	West Coast		Tasman Sea	42°50′45″S 170°54′25″E
Ohuia Lagoon	Wairoa	Hawke's Bay		Pacific Ocean	39°03′00″S 177°28′45″E
Ōkari Lagoon	Buller District	West Coast		Tasman Sea	41°50′00″S 171°28′00″E
Ōkārito Lagoon	Westland District	West Coast	3,240	Tasman Sea	43°12′00″S 170°13′00″E
Ōkupe Lagoon	Kapiti Island	Wellington		Tasman Sea	40°49′35″S 174°56′50″E
Lake Ōnoke	Palliser Bay	Wellington	6,300	Cook Strait	41°23′00″S 175°08′00″E
Ōrākei Basin	Remuera	Auckland		Waitematā Harbour	36°52′00″S 174°48′45″E
Orokonui Lagoon	Waitati	Otago		Pacific Ocean	45°45′10″S 170°35′00″E
Orowaiti Lagoon	Westport	West Coast		Tasman Sea	41°44′45″S 171°37′50″E
Panmure Basin	Mount Wellington	Auckland		Tāmaki River	36°54′20″S 174°51′00″E
Patangata Lagoon	Wairoa	Hawke's Bay	10	Pacific Ocean	39°03′03″S 177°36′30″E
Pleasant River estuary	Waikouaiti	Otago	220	Pacific Ocean	45°33′30″S 170°43′30″E
Pōrangahau River mouth	Pōrangahau	Hawke's Bay	226	Pacific Ocean	41°23′00″S 175°08′00″E
Pororari Lagoon	Grey District	West Coast		Tasman Sea	42°06′02″S 171°20′22″E
Pukaki Lagoon	Westland District	West Coast		Tasman Sea	42°49′35″S 170°56′00″E
Rakaia Lagoon	Rakaia River mouth	Canterbury		Pacific Ocean	43°53′50″S 172°13′05″E
Rangitata River mouth	Timaru and Ashburton Districts	Canterbury		Pacific Ocean	44°11′00″S 171°31′00″E
Rotokare / Barrett Lagoon	New Plymouth	Taranaki		Mangaotuku Stream	39°05′30″S 174°02′30″E
Saltwater Lagoon	Westland District	West Coast		Tasman Sea	43°06′00″S 170°21′00″E
Spider Lagoon	Timaru District	Canterbury		Pacific Ocean	44°15′00″S 171°23′30″E
Tank Farm	Northcote	Auckland		Waitematā Harbour	36°48′05″S 174°45′10″E
Tapuarau Lagoon	Near the Waitōtara River	Taranaki		South Taranaki Bight	39°50′26″S 174°40′40″E
Te Paeroa Lagoon	Wairoa	Hawke's Bay	105	Pacific Ocean	39°03′00″S 177°31′00″E
Te Puna-a-Taipuhi	Hurunui District	Canterbury		Pacific Ocean	42°55′10″S 173°16′25″E
Te Whanga Lagoon	Chatham Island	Chatham Islands	16,000	Pacific Ocean	43°52′00″S 176°28′00″W
Three Mile Lagoon	Westland District	West Coast		Tasman Sea	43°14′45″S 170°08′00″E
Tomahawk Lagoon	Otago Peninsula	Otago	30	Pacific Ocean	45°54′05″S 170°32′35″E
Tōtara Lagoon (West Coast)	Westland District	West Coast		Tasman Sea	42°51′00″S 170°50′00″E
Tōtara Lagoon (Wellington)	Waikanae	Wellington	0.4	Tasman Sea	40°51′23″S 175°02′28″E
Tukes Lagoons	Westland District	West Coast		Tasman Sea	42°50′00″S 170°55′45″E
Tūtaepatu Lagoon	Waimakariri District	Canterbury		Pacific Ocean	43°19′35″S 172°42′15″E
Waiatoto Lagoon	Westland District	West Coast		Tasman Sea	43°58′20″S 168°48′10″E
Waikouaiti River Estuary	Karitane	Otago	229	Pacific Ocean	45°38′10″S 170°39′20″E
Waimeha Lagoon	Waikanae	Wellington	1	Tasman Sea	40°52′02″S 175°01′09″E
Wainono Lagoon	South Canterbury	Canterbury		Pacific Ocean	44°42′00″S 171°09′00″E
Waipu Lagoons	Bell Block	Taranaki	2	Pacific Ocean	39°01′50″S 174°08′10″E
Wairau Lagoon	Wairoa	Hawke's Bay	35	Pacific Ocean	39°03′00″S 177°30′00″E
Waitahora Lagoon	Spirits Bay	Northland	50	Pacific Ocean	34°27′20″S 172°48′00″E
Waituna Lagoon	Awarua Plain	Southland	1,350	Foveaux Strait	46°34′00″S 168°35′25″E
Waiuna Lagoon	Southland District	Southland	360	Tasman Sea	44°18′25″S 168°08′25″E
Washdyke Lagoon	Timaru	Canterbury	48	Pacific Ocean	44°21′50″S 171°15′10″E
Whairepo Lagoon	Wellington	Wellington	0.6	Wellington Harbour	41°17′20″S 174°46′45″E
Whakakī Lagoon	Wairoa	Hawke's Bay	607	Pacific Ocean	39°02′35″S 177°33′10″E
Whakamahi Lagoon	Wairoa	Hawke's Bay		Pacific Ocean	39°03′50″S 177°24′05″E
Wherowhero Lagoon	Poverty Bay	Gisborne	160	Pacific Ocean	38°44′00″S 177°56′00″E

- ‡ The bed of the Ahuriri Lagoon was raised by the 1931 Napier earthquake, permanently draining the lagoon.
