= 2021 East Otago lead poisoning scare =

Water contamination scare in New Zealand

In February 2021, the East Otago towns of Waikouaiti and Karitane in New Zealand reported high lead levels in their water supplies. Local and national authorities responded by dispatching water tanks and staff to assist local residents and offering them free blood tests, fruits and vegetables. The lead poisoning scare also attracted coverage by national media. By 10 March 2021, the Southern District Health Board confirmed that test results indicated that long term exposure to lead in the water supply posed minimal risk to the local population.

== History ==
In early February 2021, high levels of lead (40 times the acceptable level of 0.01 mg/L) were detected in the water supplies of the towns of Waikouaiti and Karitane, which lie within the boundaries of Dunedin. The high levels of lead were first detected on 18 December 2020 but the alert was emailed to a Dunedin City Council staff member who was on holiday. In response, Director-General of Health Ashley Bloomfield offered free blood tests to Karitane and Waikouaiti residents. Dunedin City Council dispatched water tanks and staff to assist and reassure local residents. Prime Minister Jacinda Ardern described the lead levels in the towns as "unacceptable". On 9 February, the City Council distributed free fruit and vegetables to residents of Waikouaiti, Karitane, and Hawksbury due to concerns about eating crops irrigated with water believed to be contaminated.

As a result of the lead scare, the City Council announced on 11 February that it would drain a raw water reservoir and replace five kilometers of old pipes in order to reassure residents of Waikouaiti, Karitane and Hawksbury. By 10 March, the Southern District Health Board confirmed that 1,512 people had been tested, with blood test results indicating that nobody had a blood lead level requiring hospitalisation and that long term exposure to lead from the water supply was limited.

On 28 July, Dunedin City Council lifted the "do not drink water" notice in Waikouaiti, Karitane, and Hawksbury. However, the Ministry of Health recommended that people flush about 500 ml of water from the cold tap before using water for drinking, cooking or brushing teeth. Authorities have been unable to identify the source of the lead scare.
