= Hine Taimoa =

Māori lecturer and singer (1873–1939)

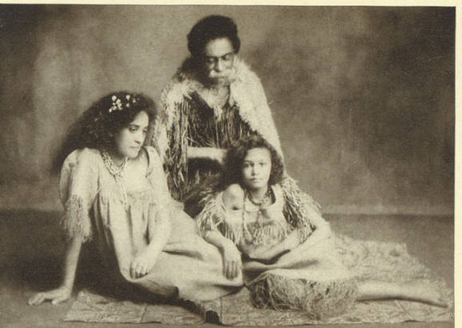
Hine Taimoa and Francis Rawei with their child in 1912

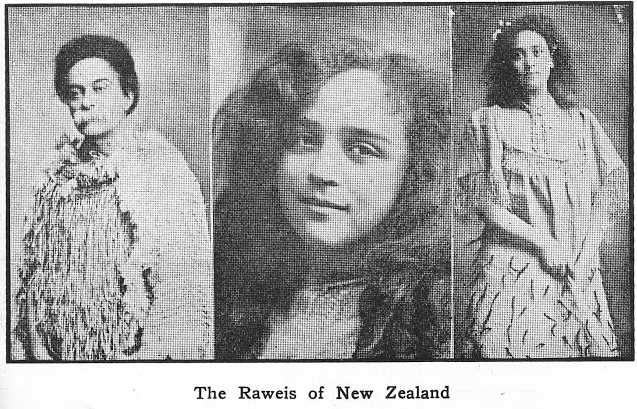
The Rawei family (Francis Rawei, Eva or Piwa, and Hine Taimoa) in 1913

Emily Jean Rawei (née Sizemore; 10 February 1873 – 15 October 1939), known by the stage name Hine Taimoa, was a New Zealand Māori lecturer and singer, with her husband, Wherahiko Francis Rawei, and other family members. The family toured internationally from the 1890s through the 1910s to demonstrate and speak on Māori culture.

== Early life and family ==
Emily Jean Sizemore was born on 10 February 1873, the fourth daughter of James and Sarah Sizemore (née Thomson), and was of both Māori and European descent. Her paternal grandparents were whaler Richard Sizemore, who was the brother-in-law of Johnny Jones, and Waniwani also known as Waiuwaiu from the Bay of Islands area/and daughter of a Ngapuhi Rangatira . On 1 January 1893, Emily Sizemore married Francis Rawei at her mother's property, Woodend Farm, in Waikouaiti.

== Career ==
The Rawei family toured internationally, singing, telling stories, and presenting a magic lantern show of hand-coloured scenes from Māori life in New Zealand. They started their travels in Australia in 1893, with a show called "Land of the Maori" that included Hine's sister, Hari Taimoa. "Her voice is full and beautiful, and her speech the essence of refinement," noted an 1898 Australian reporter of Hine Taimoa. The also made appearances in England, in 1897.

They toured the United States from their arrival at New York in 1903 into the 1910s, lecturing and performing on the Chautauqua and lyceum circuit in the United States and Canada. They also gave their presentation, titled "The New Zealanders in Song, Story, and Picture: From Cannibalism to Culture", at museums and teachers' conventions. Taimoa was also called upon to speak on women's suffrage (because New Zealand women had the vote before American women), on the preparation of food and clothing, and on American childrearing practices (she considered them less healthful compared to those of Māori parents). She was not impressed with life in Chicago, where the family were based during some of their time in North America. Their children Piwa (Eva) and Rae were sometimes included in their act.

After being injured in a car accident in Georgia in 1925, Francis Rawei's health deteriorated, and the couple decided to return to New Zealand. In Avarua in the Cook Islands, Francis Rawei died on 27 January 1928. Taimoa continued to New Zealand, and died in Wellington on 15 October 1939. She was buried at Waikouaiti.
