= Goat Island, Otago =

There are two places in Otago, New Zealand, called Goat Island

- Goat Island, Otago Harbour, located close to Port Chalmers
- Mapoutahi, (actually a peninsula, not an island), near Pūrākaunui
