= Waipu =

Waipu may refer to:

== New Zealand ==
- Waipu Lagoons, near New Plymouth
- Waipu, New Zealand, town in Northland
- Waipu River, river in Northland

== Taiwan ==
- Waipu District, Taichung
- Waipu Fishing Port, Miaoli County

== Other uses ==
- Waipu, a reaction video superimposed on the corner of the screen, mainly used in Japanese TV shows
