= Pūrākaunui =

- Rural settlement
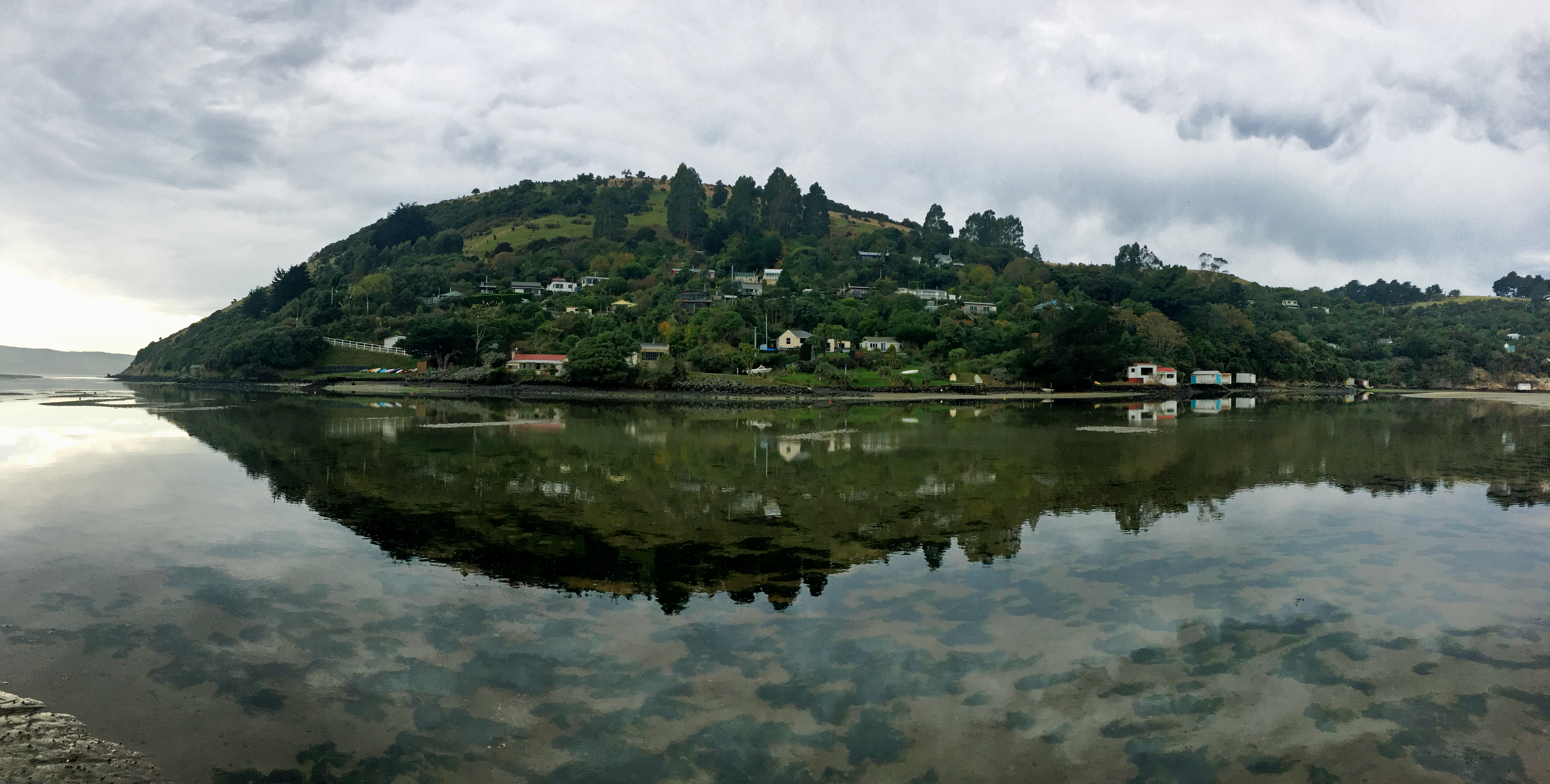
- The Point (Potato Point) Pūrākaunui
- Interactive map of Pūrākaunui
- Coordinates: 45°45′S 170°38′E
- Country: New Zealand
- Island: South Island
- Region: Otago
- City: Dunedin
- Community board: West Harbour Community Board
- Electorates: Dunedin; Te Tai Tonga (Māori)

Government
  - Territorial authority: Dunedin City Council
  - Regional council: Otago Regional Council
  - Mayor of Dunedin: Sophie Barker
  - Dunedin MP: Rachel Brooking
  - Te Tai Tonga MP: Tākuta Ferris

Area
  - Total: 2.84 km^{2} (1.10 sq mi)

Population (June 2025)
  - Total: 210
  - Density: 74/km^{2} (190/sq mi)
- Time zone: UTC+12 (NZST)
  - Summer (DST): UTC+13 (NZDT)
- Area code: 03
- Local iwi: Ngāi Tahu

Pūrākaunui (formerly spelt Purakanui) is a small settlement in Otago, in the South Island of New Zealand. It is located within the bounds of the city of Dunedin, in a rural coastal area some 25 km (16 mi) to the north of the city centre.

Pūrākaunui lies close to the Pacific Coast to the east of Waitati and north of Port Chalmers, on a peninsula between Long Beach and the Pūrākaunui Inlet. On the opposite shore of the inlet is the community of Osborne. Both settlements lie close to the Orokonui Ecosanctuary and the historic pā site of Mapoutahi (Goat Island).

Noted former residents of Pūrākaunui include poet David Howard.

Pūrākaunui should not be confused with the locale with the same name in The Catlins, some 100 km further south, which is home to the Purakaunui Falls, in the Pūrākaunui Bay Scenic Reserve on the Pūrākaunui River.

== History ==
=== Indigenous agriculture ===
According to their oral history, Māori people grew sweet potatoes (kūmara) in coastal Otago, and their religious practice featured worship of the agricultural deity Rongo. Prior to 2021, Western archaeologists believed that the sweet potato failed to flourish in New Zealand south of Christchurch due to its unfavourable climate, forcing Māori in those latitudes to become (along with the Moriori of the Chatham Islands) the only Polynesian people who subsisted solely on hunting and gathering. However, a 2021 analysis of material excavated from Pūrākaunui revealed that sweet potatoes were grown and stored there during the 15th century, before the industry was disrupted by factors speculated to be due to the Little Ice Age. The researchers (from the University of Otago) urged future archaeologists to give more weight to accounts from indigenous oral history.

=== The Mapoutahi massacre ===
Chief Taoka was based at a kāika (small settlement) near what is now Timaru. He had visited his nephew (some sources say cousin), Kāti Māmoe chief Te Wera, at the latter's pā, Huriawa, near the mouth of the Waikouaiti River. The two set out to visit another relative, Kapo, and while staying with him they began a heated argument. The argument developed into a fight, during which Te Wera killed Taoka's son.

Taoka returned to his kāika and summoned a war party which laid siege to Huriawa for a year without success. Taoka then moved his party south to attack Te Wera's chief ally, Pakihaukea, at Mapoutahi. Pakihaukea's guard was relaxed and Taoka struck, climbing the palisades in the dead of night and massacring the 250 people found within. So great was the carnage that the name Pūrākaunui (pū rākau nui, "large wood pile") refers to the sight of the bodies which had been piled in a huge heap outside the pā.

== Demographics ==
Pūrākaunui is described by Statistics New Zealand as a rural settlement. It covers 2.84 km^{2} (1.10 sq mi), and had an estimated population of 210 as of June 2025, with a population density of 74 people per km^{2}. It is part of the much larger Mount Cargill statistical area.

Historical population
Year	Pop.	±% p.a.
2006	192	—
2013	201	+0.66%
2018	210	+0.88%

Pūrākaunui had a population of 210 at the 2018 New Zealand census, an increase of 9 people (4.5%) since the 2013 census, and an increase of 18 people (9.4%) since the 2006 census. There were 93 households, comprising 108 males and 102 females, giving a sex ratio of 1.06 males per female. The median age was 50.8 years (compared with 37.4 years nationally), with 36 people (17.1%) aged under 15 years, 18 (8.6%) aged 15 to 29, 108 (51.4%) aged 30 to 64, and 51 (24.3%) aged 65 or older.

Ethnicities were 94.3% European/Pākehā, 11.4% Māori, and 2.9% other ethnicities. People may identify with more than one ethnicity.

Although some people chose not to answer the census's question about religious affiliation, 67.1% had no religion, 22.9% were Christian and 1.4% had other religions.

Of those at least 15 years old, 57 (32.8%) people had a bachelor's or higher degree, and 21 (12.1%) people had no formal qualifications. The median income was $29,500, compared with $31,800 nationally. 30 people (17.2%) earned over $70,000 compared to 17.2% nationally. The employment status of those at least 15 was that 81 (46.6%) people were employed full-time, 24 (13.8%) were part-time, and 6 (3.4%) were unemployed.

== Education ==
Pūrākaunui School is a full primary school serving years 1 to 8, with a roll of 9 students as at July 2026. The school celebrated its 125th jubilee in 1997.
