= Hawksbury, New Zealand =

Locality in Dunedin City, Otago Region, New Zealand

Coordinates: 45.617534°S 170.637782°E

Hawksbury, also known as Cherry Farm (and sometimes erroneously as "Evansdale"), is a small residential and industrial area in New Zealand, located beside State Highway 1 between Dunedin and Waikouaiti.

== Place names ==
Hawksbury was the site of Dunedin's Cherry Farm Psychiatric Hospital, and the name Cherry Farm is still widely used within Otago for the hospital's former site. The name Hawksbury (often misspelled Hawkesbury) was an early English name for the settlement at Waikouaiti, and is still applied to the nearby Hawksbury Lagoon and several businesses there. The developers of Hawksbury Village probably changed the name from Cherry Farm because of the social stigma attached to psychiatric hospitals. The area's association with mental health care is maintained in the name of the Hawksbury Community Living Trust, a service set up in 1992 to rehouse former hospital patients, which has since opened 10 further homes in Dunedin and Christchurch. Hawksbury is sometimes erroneously referred to as Evansdale, owing to the prominent signage on the Evansdale Cheese factory, which moved to Hawkesbury from Evansdale in the 1990s.

The nearby Matanaka Farm, which contains New Zealand's oldest surviving farm buildings, was first settled by the pioneer whaler Johnny Jones in 1840. Cherry Farm was named for Captain Cherry, the master of one of Jones's ships.

== Hawksbury Village ==
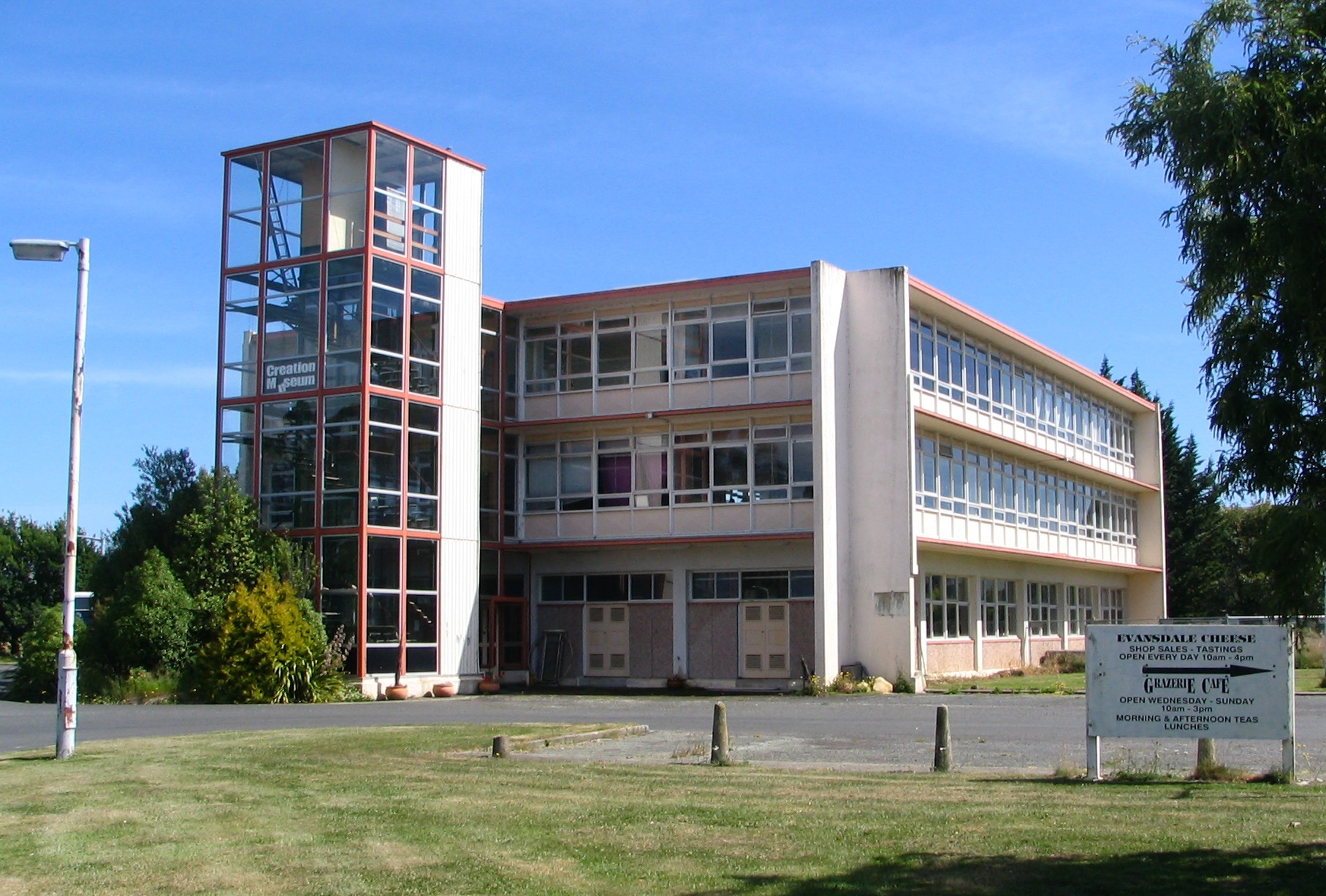
Former hospital building in 2008

Cherry Farm Hospital, a psychiatric hospital serving the Dunedin area, opened in 1952, and patients from Seacliff Mental Hospital at Seacliff were relocated there soon afterwards. Cherry Farm Hospital epitomised the village-asylum atmosphere in name and design, contrasting with the harsh conditions in the fortress-like Seacliff Hospital.

When the hospital closed in 1992, it was the consequence of new arrangements for the three groups of patients that remained. While at its peak Cherry Farm had many hundreds of patients, in latter years this number had dropped to below 400. Psychogeriatric and general adult psychiatric patients were either transferred to Wakari Hospital, or to residential care or supported accommodation in the community, people with intellectual disability moved to new lives in the community provided by a range of community agencies, one of which was Hawksbury Community Living Trust. The closure of Cherry Farm Hospital was a key milestone in the policy of successive governments to implement deinstitutionalisation. This process was completed nationwide in October 2006 with the closure of Kimberley Centre, Levin, the last large institution of its type.

Hawksbury Village located in East Otago is a privately owned and managed residential village. It is run by a board of directors elected by the shareholders, of whom some own properties in the village.

Since the hospital site was converted to a residential village, many modern homes have been built that now house local families. There are still a few privately owned buildings that were part of the hospital network and some of the bigger ones called "Villas" these have now been converted to residential homes.

Amenities available in the village include Hawksbury Christian Fellowship Church, Moana Gow Pool, Evansdale Cheese Factory and Matanaka Meats. Moana Gow Pool is a 20 m, 4-lane heated pool which offers swimming lessons, aquacize, adult lane swimming and more.

A new bus shelter has recently been built for the children in Hawksbury Village who use the local school bus services. This shelter also houses a new Hawksbury Village information map so that visitors can find their way easily, and locate the amenities in the village.

== Notable people ==
- Winifred Annie Valentine, educationalist
