= Huriawa Peninsula =

Headland on the coast of New Zealand

Coordinates: 45°38′30″S 170°40′0″E

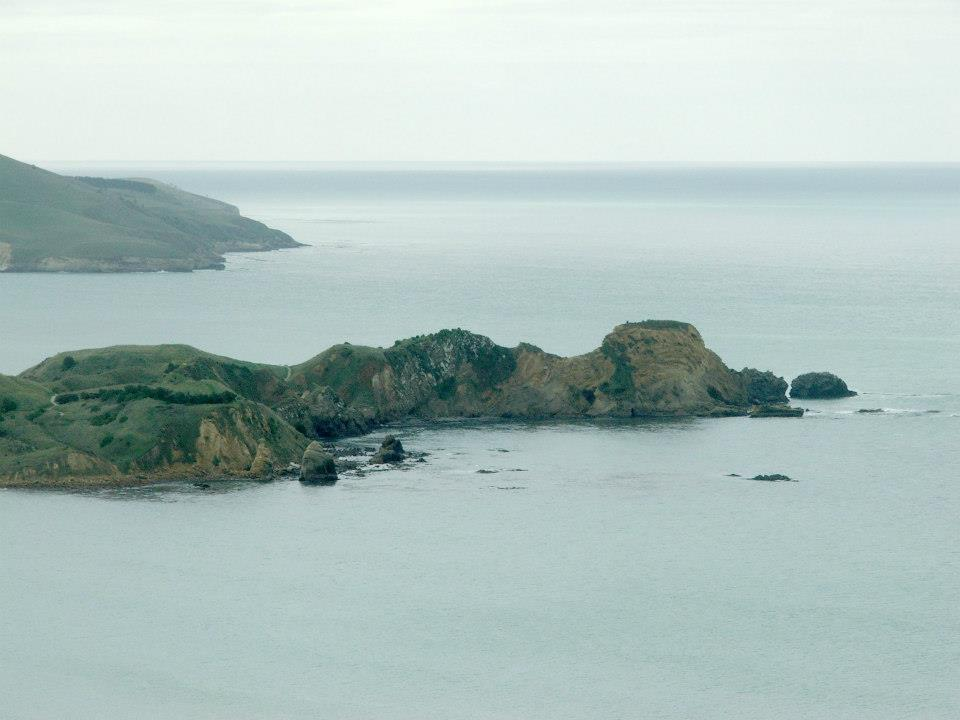
View of Huriawa Peninsula from Puketeraki Lookout, three kilometres to the south.

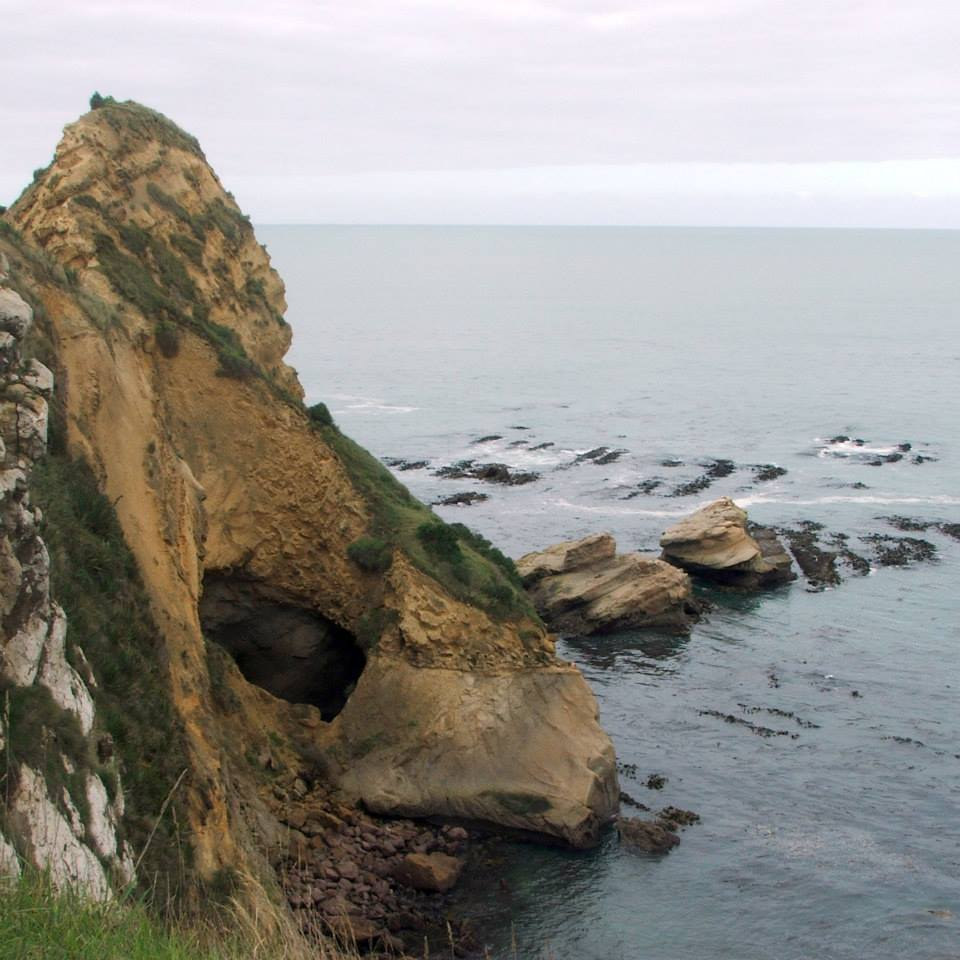
Blowhole on ocean coast of Huriawa Peninsula

Huriawa, commonly known as Huriawa Peninsula or Karitane Peninsula, is a headland on the coast of Otago, New Zealand. It is located 35 kilometres north of Dunedin city centre, immediately to the southeast of the settlement of Karitane.

The peninsula is steep and rocky, and stretches east for approximately 1000 metres from the mainland at the mouth of the Waikouaiti River. At its narrowest, the isthmus connecting it with Karitane is only some 90 metres in width. The name huriawa is a Māori term meaning "turning river"; the Waikouaiti River, which now flows to the sea to the north of the peninsula, formerly entered the sea to the peninsula's south. The southern, ocean coast of the peninsula is lined with sheer cliffs, and includes several rock pinnacles and blowholes. The northern, estuary coast is less rugged, but still steep. The opposite bank of the river is the large sandspit which forms the southern end of Waikouaiti Beach.

The isthmus is the site of Karitane cemetery, and of a memorial marking the location of the first Christian sermon given in Otago, by Rev. James Watkin on 17 May 1840.

The western end of the peninsula is dotted with a handful of houses and other buildings, the most notable of which is Sir Truby King's historic Kingscliff House. The remaining four fifths of the peninsula is designated as a historic reserve.

== Huriawa pā site and reserve ==
The reserve covers the area previously occupied by Huriawa pā (Te Pa a Te Wera) a major coastal Māori fortification, believed to have been established by Kāi Tahu chief Te Wera in the years immediately preceding Captain James Cook's visit to New Zealand in the late 18th century. The six-month siege of the pā by Te Wera's cousin Taoka (presumably in the mid-18th century) is one of the most widely recorded pre-colonial events along the Otago coastline. The pā had the strength given to it by its inaccessible location and also due to the natural spring (Te Punawai a Te Wera) which provided it with its own water supply. The siege was one of a number of battles between the two chiefs which ranged along the coastline from Timaru to the mouth of Otago Harbour.

Huriawa Historic Reserve covers 13.32 hectares (32.9 acres) and is accessible to the general public. It features a loop track some 2.5 kilometres in length. The title to Huriawa was returned to the Kāi Tahu iwi by the Crown in 1998 as part of the iwi's Waitangi Tribunal land claim settlement, and is managed by Kāti Huirapa Rūnaka ki Puketeraki and the New Zealand Department of Conservation.

== See also ==
- Mapoutahi
