= Karitane =

- Town
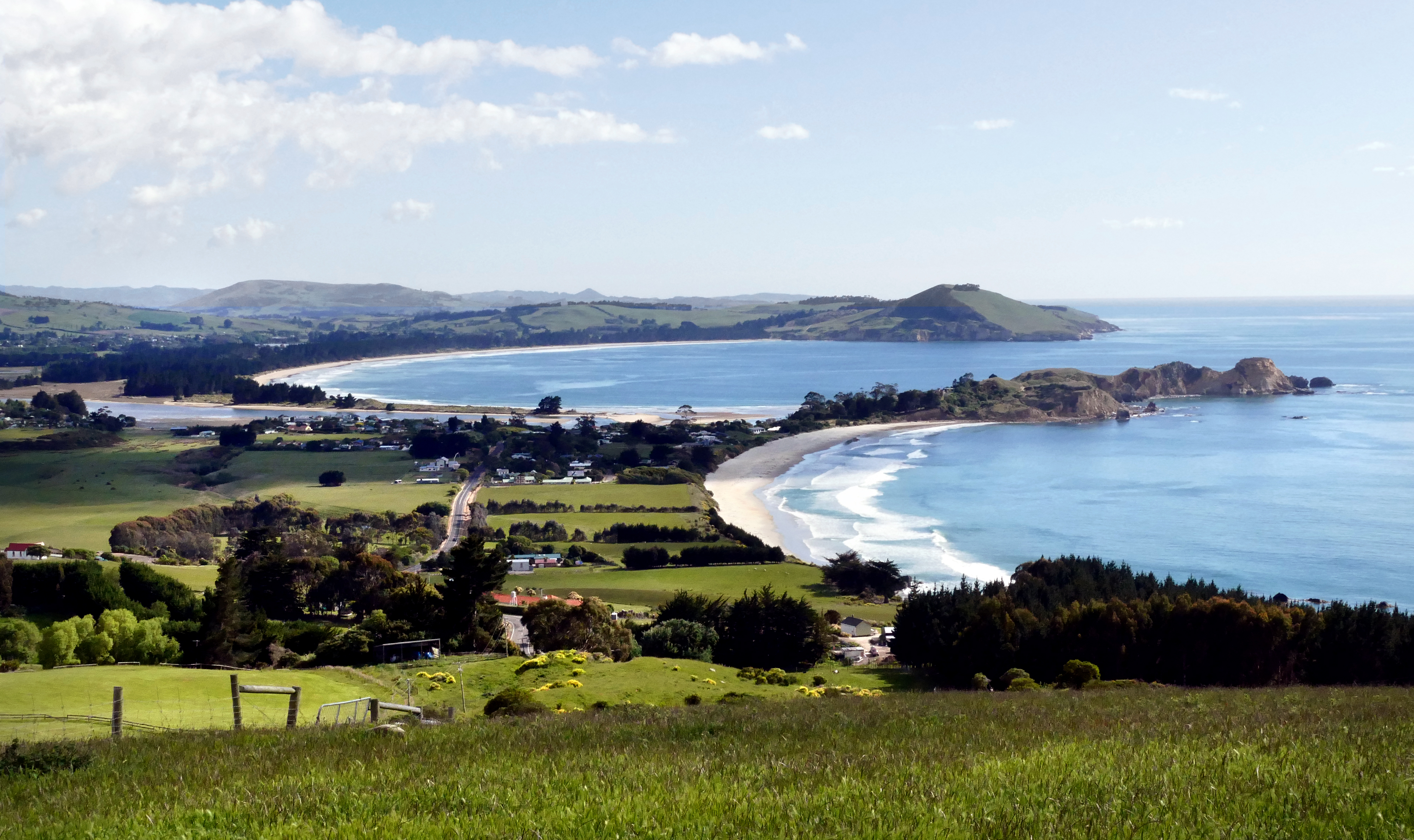
- Karitane Beach
- Interactive map of Karitane
- Coordinates: 45°38′20″S 170°39′20″E
- Country: New Zealand
- Region: Otago
- District: Dunedin
- Community board: Waikouaiti Coast Community Board
- Electorates: Dunedin; Te Tai Tonga (Māori)

Government
  - Territorial authority: Dunedin City Council
  - Regional council: Otago Regional Council
  - Mayor of Dunedin: Sophie Barker
  - Dunedin MP: Rachel Brooking
  - Te Tai Tonga MP: Tākuta Ferris

Area
  - Total: 1.29 km^{2} (0.50 sq mi)

Population (June 2025)
  - Total: 430
  - Density: 330/km^{2} (860/sq mi)
- Time zone: UTC+12 (NZST)
  - Summer (DST): UTC+13 (NZDT)
- Postcode: 9471
- Local iwi: Ngāi Tahu

The small town of Karitane is located within the limits of the city of Dunedin in New Zealand, 35 kilometres to the north of the city centre.

Set in rolling country near the mouth of the Waikouaiti River, the town is a popular holiday retreat for Dunedinites.

== History ==
=== Early history ===
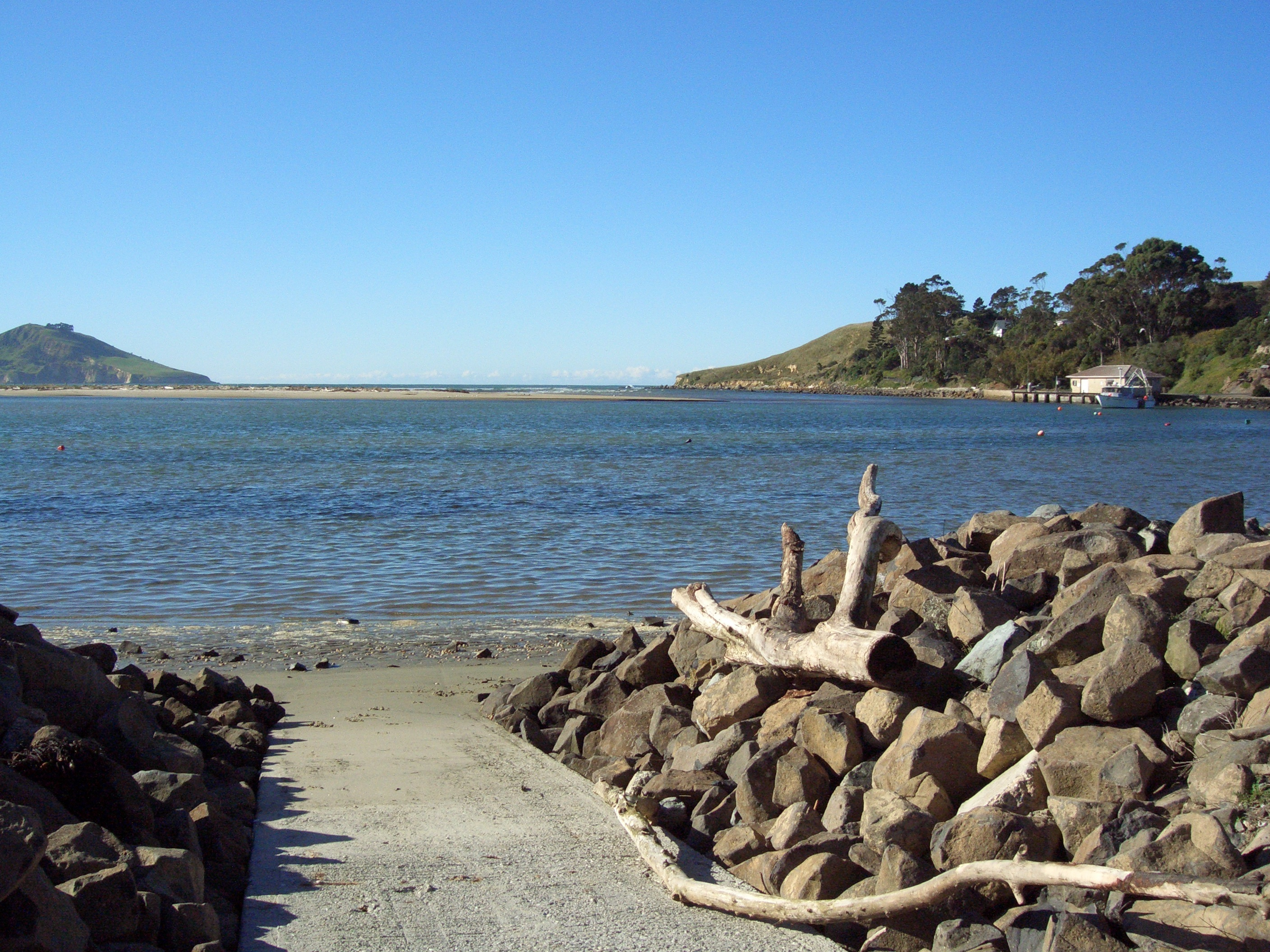
Waikouaiti River estuary at Karitane; fishing wharf and channel to the Pacific Ocean at right, Matanaka headland at left background.

The site of the present settlement of Karitane includes that of the pre-European Māori kaika, or undefended village. Giant moa were likely to be hunted in the area.

It encompasses Huriawa on the adjacent peninsula, a pā or fortified village, recalled in oral tradition for sieges in the late 17th or early 18th centuries. It was also the site of the whaling station set up by Long, Wright and Richards in 1837. That was known as Waikouaiti, but the name later became transferred to the present township of that name established by Johnny Jones as a farming settlement in 1840, on the north side of the estuary.

=== Modern history ===
In 1838, Jones acquired the Karitane whaling station, primarily targeting southern rights and humpbacks, resulting in severe depletion of local populations for these species. After sending pioneers to start his farming settlement he sent a Wesleyan missionary to join them in May 1840. Rev. James Watkin established the first mission station in the South Island. The first Christian service in the South Island took place in Karitane on 17 May, 1840. Watkin set up his mission station at Karitane. He was living there with his wife and children in a purpose-built house by late 1842. In 1867 George O'Brien painted a memorable view looking north from the Karitane waterfront, now in the Toitū Otago Settlers Museum, Dunedin.

==== 2021 lead poisoning scare ====
In early February 2021, high levels of lead (40 times the acceptable level of 0.01mg/L) were detected in Karitane and nearby Waikouaiti's drinking water. The high levels of lead were first detected on 18 December 2020 but the alert was emailed to a Dunedin City Council staff member who was on holiday. In response, Director-General of Health Ashley Bloomfield offered free blood tests to Karitane and Waikouaiti residents. The Dunedin City Council also dispatched water tanks and staff to assist and reassure local residents. Prime Minister Jacinda Ardern described the lead levels in Karitane and Waikouaiti as "unacceptable." On 9 February, the City Council distributed free fruits and vegetables to residents of Karitane, Waikouaiti, and Hawksbury due to concerns about eating crops irrigated with the contaminated water. On 11 February, the Dunedin City Council also confirmed that it would drain a raw water reservoir and replace 5 kilometres of old pipes in order to reassure local residents. By 10 March, the Southern District Health Board confirmed that 1,512 people had been tested, with blood test results indicating that nobody had a blood lead level requiring hospitalisation and that long term exposure to lead from the water supply was limited.

== Notable people ==
=== Truby King ===
The name Karitane is often associated with pioneering paediatrician and psychiatrist Sir Truby King, founder of the Plunket Society. The name is echoed in many New Zealand child-related services and products:

- Plunket set up a string of neonatal care institutions known throughout the country as Karitane Hospitals, starting here in Truby King's house, Kingscliff
- A type of infant formula, Karicare, now made by Nutricia, as well as earlier brands Karilac and Kariol made by the Karitane Products Society are named after the town
- Karitane Nurse (historically) a type of nurse in New Zealand specialising in infant care
- Community Karitane, a type of community worker in New Zealand advising on parenting issues such as breastfeeding, nutrition, sleep and behaviour.
- Karitane yellow, an informal name for a (baby-excrement-coloured) unpleasant shade of yellow
- After 40 years absence in the market the Karilac brand has relaunched with a new infant formula called Shegoa which is made from goat and sheep milk.

Truby King also worked at nearby Seacliff Lunatic Asylum.

=== Orpheus Beaumont ===
Orpheus Beaumont, a woman from Karitane who entered and won the international Navy competition to invent the modern life jacket in 1918.

== Demographics ==
Karitane is described by Statistics New Zealand as a rural settlement. It covers 1.29 km^{2} (0.50 sq mi) and had an estimated population of 430 as of June 2025, with a population density of 333 people per km^{2}. It is part of the much larger Bucklands Crossing statistical area.

Historical population for Karitane
Year	Pop.	±% p.a.
2006	348	—
2013	363	+0.60%
2018	405	+2.21%

Karitane had a population of 405 at the 2018 New Zealand census, an increase of 42 people (11.6%) since the 2013 census, and an increase of 57 people (16.4%) since the 2006 census. There were 192 households, comprising 198 males and 207 females, giving a sex ratio of 0.96 males per female, with 66 people (16.3%) aged under 15 years, 42 (10.4%) aged 15 to 29, 195 (48.1%) aged 30 to 64, and 102 (25.2%) aged 65 or older.

Ethnicities were 92.6% European/Pākehā, 11.1% Māori, 0.7% Asian, and 2.2% other ethnicities. People may identify with more than one ethnicity.

Although some people chose not to answer the census's question about religious affiliation, 59.3% had no religion, 28.1% were Christian, 0.7% had Māori religious beliefs, 1.5% were Buddhist and 0.7% had other religions.

Of those at least 15 years old, 90 (26.5%) people had a bachelor's or higher degree, and 54 (15.9%) people had no formal qualifications. 72 people (21.2%) earned over $70,000 compared to 17.2% nationally. The employment status of those at least 15 was that 153 (45.1%) people were employed full-time, 60 (17.7%) were part-time, and 3 (0.9%) were unemployed.

=== Bucklands Crossing ===
The Bucklands Crossing statistical area, which also includes Warrington, covers 421.96 km^{2} (162.92 sq mi). It had an estimated population of 1,670 as of June 2025, with a population density of 4.0 people per km^{2}.

Historical population for Bucklands Crossing
Year	Pop.	±% p.a.
2006	1,230	—
2013	1,425	+2.12%
2018	1,482	+0.79%

Bucklands Crossing had a population of 1,482 at the 2018 New Zealand census, an increase of 57 people (4.0%) since the 2013 census, and an increase of 252 people (20.5%) since the 2006 census. There were 675 households, comprising 753 males and 729 females, giving a sex ratio of 1.03 males per female. The median age was 48.2 years (compared with 37.4 years nationally), with 261 people (17.6%) aged under 15 years, 156 (10.5%) aged 15 to 29, 756 (51.0%) aged 30 to 64, and 309 (20.9%) aged 65 or older.

Ethnicities were 93.3% European/Pākehā, 11.7% Māori, 0.8% Pasifika, 1.2% Asian, and 1.8% other ethnicities. People may identify with more than one ethnicity.

The percentage of people born overseas was 17.2, compared with 27.1% nationally.

Although some people chose not to answer the census's question about religious affiliation, 61.1% had no religion, 26.5% were Christian, 0.4% had Māori religious beliefs, 0.2% were Hindu, 0.2% were Muslim, 1.2% were Buddhist and 2.6% had other religions.

Of those at least 15 years old, 354 (29.0%) people had a bachelor's or higher degree, and 210 (17.2%) people had no formal qualifications. The median income was $32,500, compared with $31,800 nationally. 225 people (18.4%) earned over $70,000 compared to 17.2% nationally. The employment status of those at least 15 was that 570 (46.7%) people were employed full-time, 231 (18.9%) were part-time, and 30 (2.5%) were unemployed.

== Culture ==
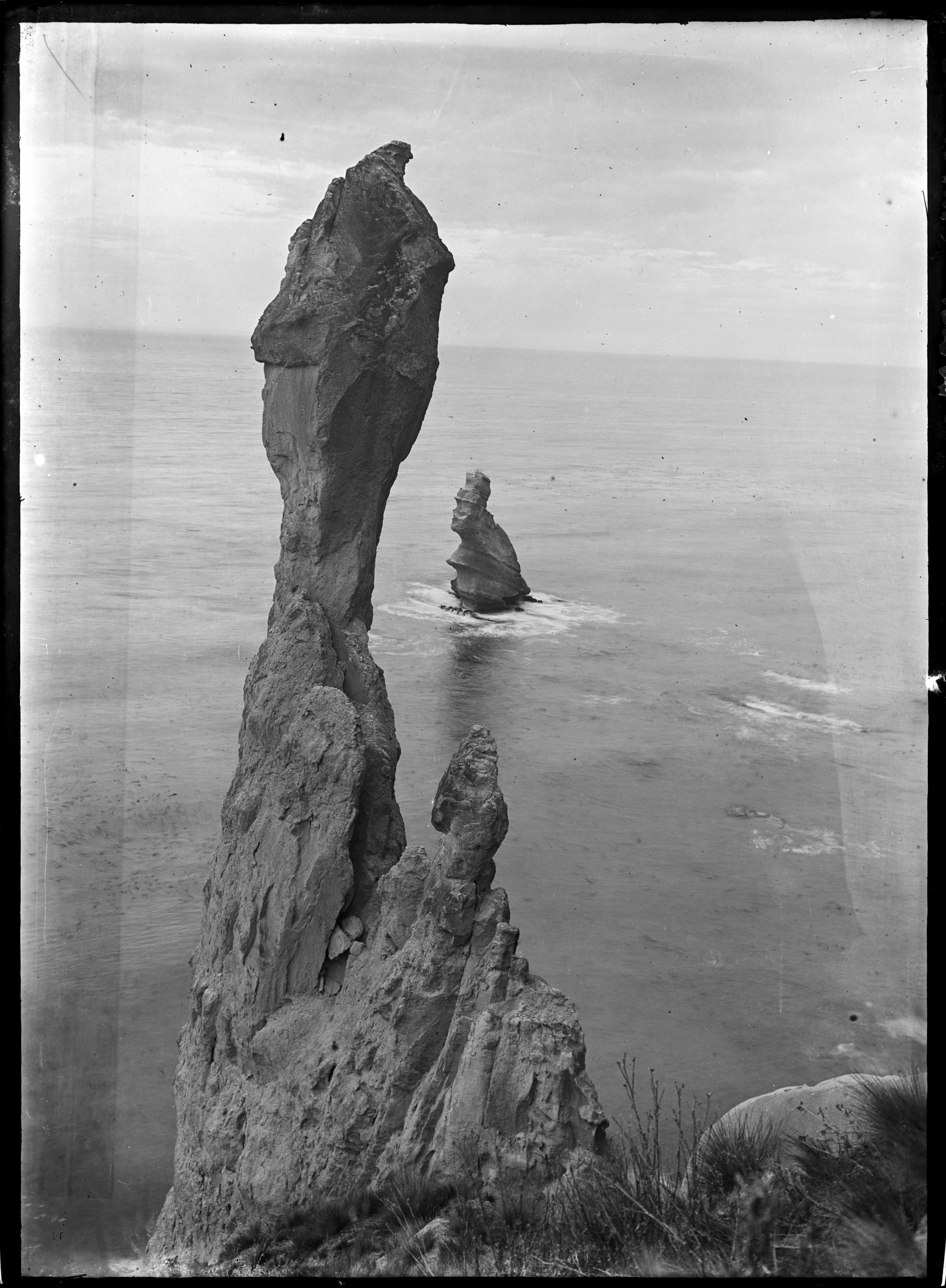
Photograph of rock formations near Puketeraki by Albert Percy Godber

Huirapa Marae, also known as Puketeraki Marae, is located in Karitāne. It is a marae (meeting ground) of Ngāi Tahu, including the Kāti Huirapa Rūnanga Ki Puketeraki branch, and includes the Karitāne wharenui (meeting house).

Close to the settlement is the site of Huriawa Pā, which was a major pā (fortification) in pre-European New Zealand. It was set in a strong position on a rocky promontory above the coast.

== Education ==
Karitane School is a co-educational state contributing primary school for Year 1 to 6 students, with a roll of 28 students as of July 2026. A school has existed at Karitane since at least 1892.

== Healthcare ==
The Arai Te Uru Whare Hauora health centre opened in former Karitane School buildings in 2003 to provide health education, social services, sexual health services and mobile nursing, for Māori and the wider Karitane community, in association with the Huirapa Marae.

== Gallery ==
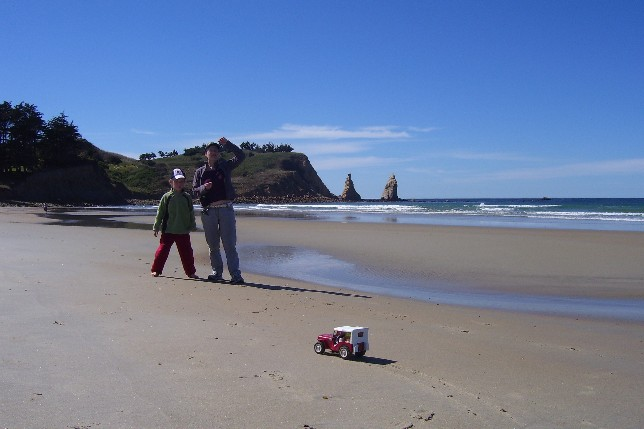
Karitane Beach

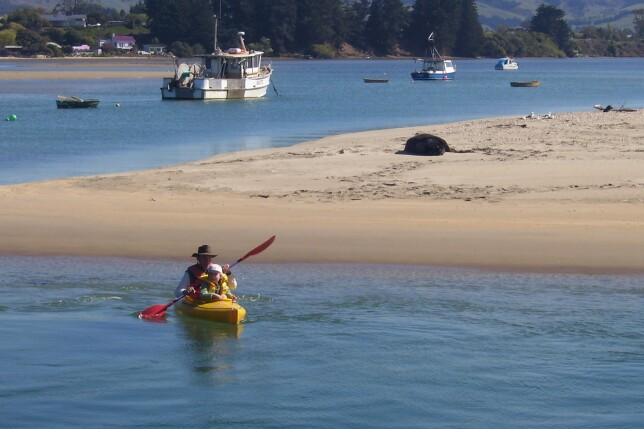
Kayakers and a Hooker's sea lion resting in Karitane Harbor

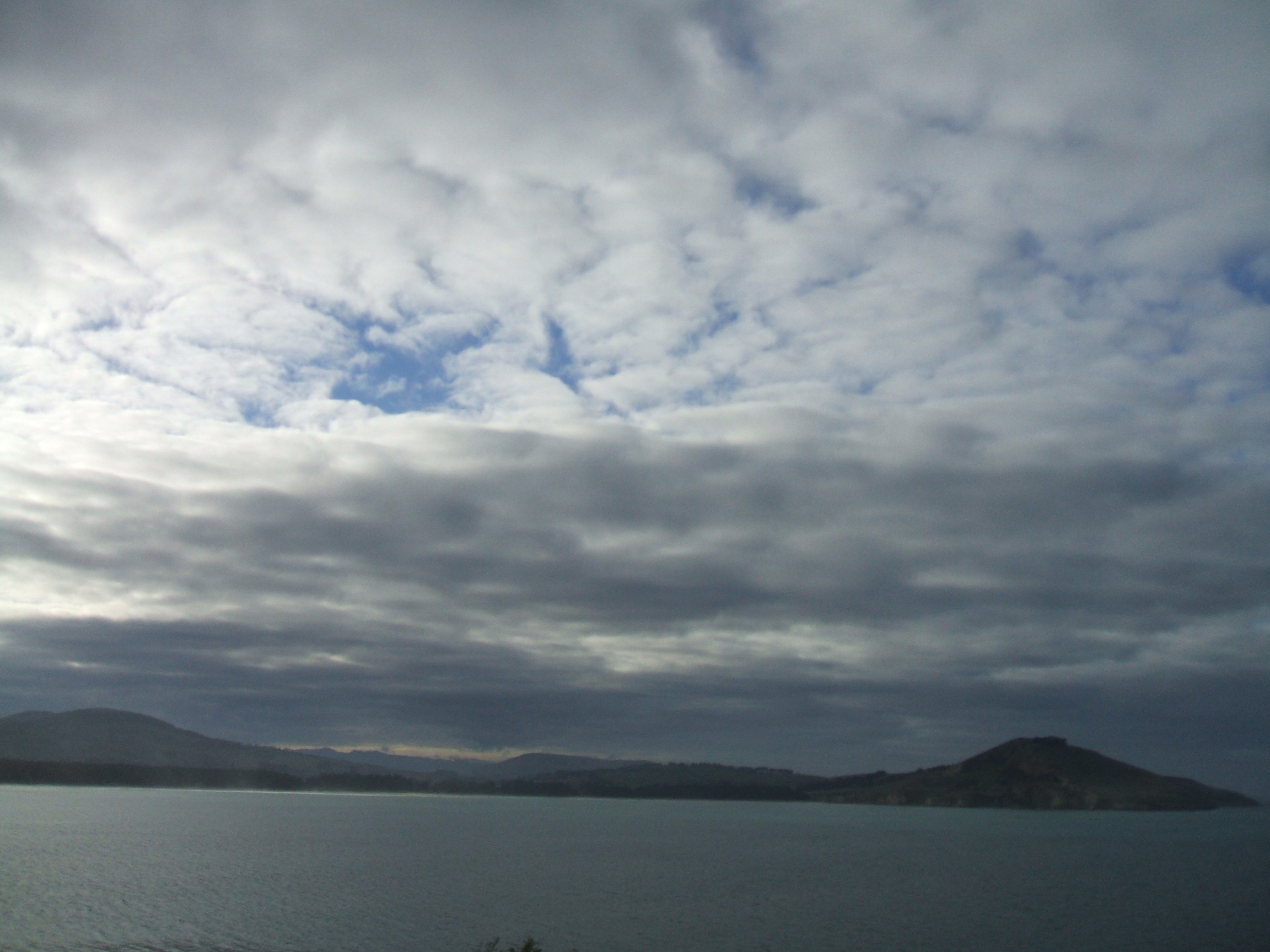
View of the Karitane harbour and seaside on a dark and cloudy day
