= Mapoutahi =

Peninsula in Otago, New Zealand

Coordinates: 45°44′05″S 170°37′00″E

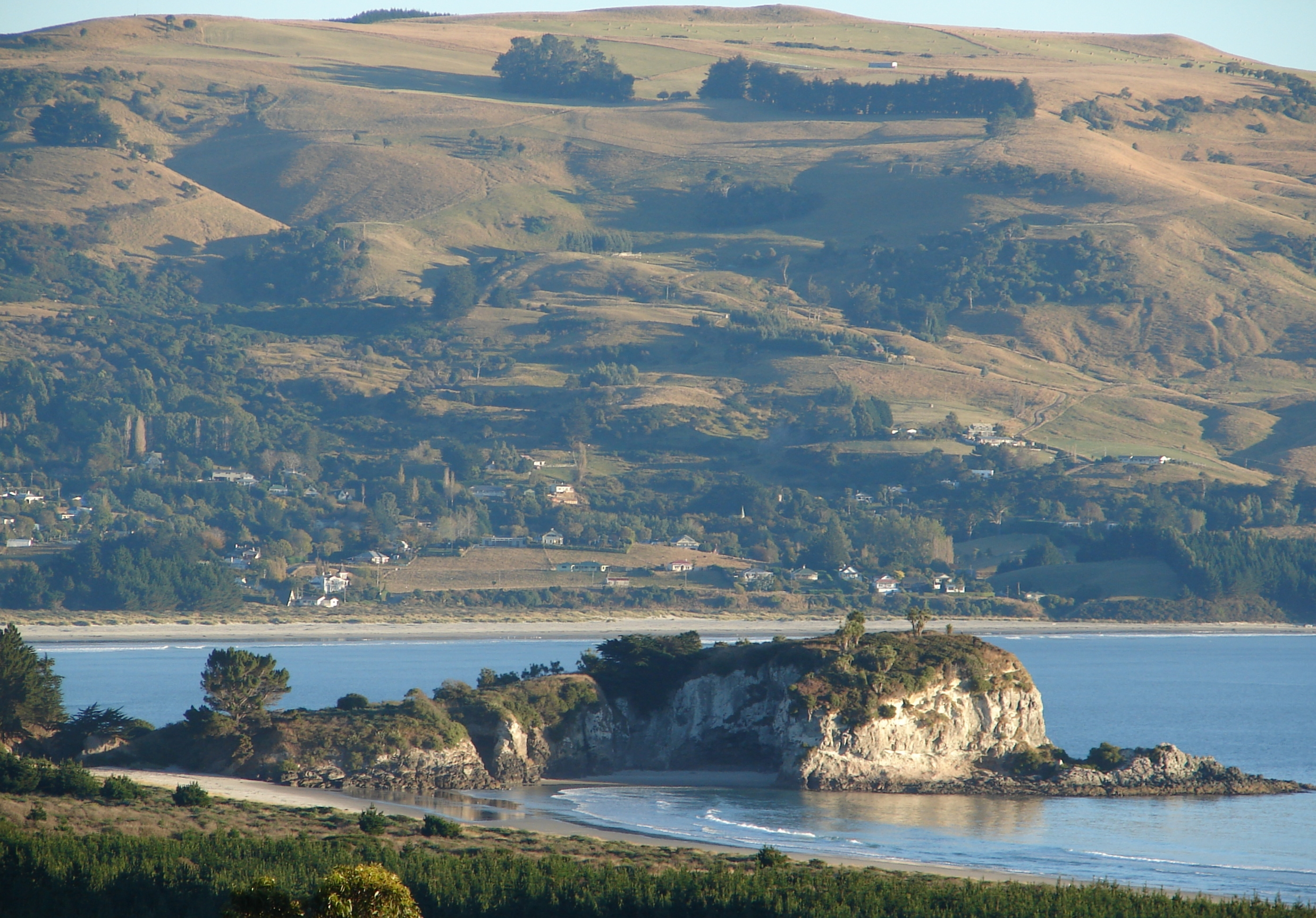

Te Mapoutahi or simply Mapoutahi is a peninsula on the coast of Otago, New Zealand, between the townships of Waitati and Pūrākaunui, within the limits of Dunedin City. It lies some 20 kilometres (12 mi) north of Dunedin's city centre.

Known also, confusingly, as "Goat Island", the peninsula's narrow isthmus and rugged coastline made it the perfect defensive location for a pā, a fortified settlement. The headland was, indeed, occupied by a Kāti Māmoe pā during the century before the arrival of Europeans in the early 1800s, and was the site of a major massacre in around 1750 when the warrior Taoka attacked the fortifications and killed those within.

The peninsula is now a scenic and historic reserve and is the site of a popular walking track.

The adjacent beach, Mapoutahi Cove, is used by naturists for nude walks and sunbathing. New Zealand has no official nude beaches, as public nudity is legal on any beach where it is "known to occur".

== The massacre at Mapoutahi Pā ==
Chief Taoka was based at a kaika (small settlement) near what is now Timaru. He had visited his nephew (some sources say cousin), Kāti Māmoe chief Te Wera, at the latter's pā, Huriawa, near the mouth of the Waikouaiti River. The two set out to visit another relative, Kapo, and while staying with him they began a heated argument. The argument developed into a fight, during which Te Wera killed Taoka's son.

Taoka returned to his kaika and summoned a war party which laid siege to Huriawa for a year without success. Taoka then moved his party south to attack Te Wera's chief ally, Pakihaukea, at Mapoutahi. Pakihaukea's guard was relaxed and Taoka struck, climbing the palisades in the dead of night and massacring the 250 people found within. So great was the carnage that the name of the nearby settlement of Pūrākaunui (literally, "wood piled up") refers to the sight of the bodies which had been piled in a huge heap outside the pā.
