= Orpheus Beaumont =

Inventor of new type of life jacket following the Titanic disaster

- Born: 14 September 1863; Jersey, Channel Islands, United Kingdom
- Died: 7 November 1951 (aged 88); Karitane, Otago, New Zealand
- Known for: Life jacket inventor
- Children: 2

Orpheus Maud Beaumont (née Newman; 14 September 1863 – 7 November 1951) was a British-born New Zealand woman who invented the Salvus life jacket.

== Biography ==
Beaumont was born on 14 September 1863 and baptised on 21 October 1863 according to her baptismal record. She was born in Jersey, Channel Islands, United Kingdom to Mary and William Newman. Beaumont was ten when her father died. Her mother migrated to Dunedin, New Zealand, with her three youngest children.

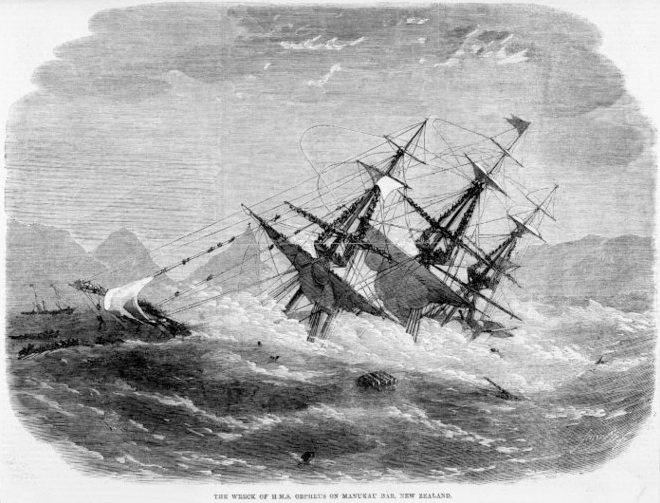
Illustration of the wreck of the HMS Orpheus in 1863

Beaumont's somewhat unusual first name is bound up with HMS Orpheus on which her teenage brother, Henry Newman, was a seaman. The Orpheus was carrying British soldiers on their way to New Zealand to fight in the Waikato Land Wars when the ship ran aground on the sandbar at the entrance to Auckland’s Manukau Harbour on 7 February 1863. Of the 259 men on board, 189 drowned and Henry Newman was incorrectly presumed to be one of those who died. As was then current practice, there were no life preservers on board the Orpheus. Henry's mother Mary was pregnant at the time of the shipwreck and after learning that her son had survived, she named her daughter Orpheus after the ship.

Beaumont was listed as 2nd Stewardess on the SS Waihora in March or April 1889. Norman Beaumont was Chief Officer on the Waihora in 1889. The couple were married on 17 June 1890. By that time Norman Beaumont had been promoted to be captain of the Union Steamship Company. They had two children, Llewelyn, born in 1892 in Suva, Fiji and Constance.

Beaumont and her daughter travelled to England in 1916 where they joined the Women's Legion. Beaumont was appointed as a supervisor at the Woolwich Arsenal canteen. Between January 1918 and June 1919, she and her husband obtained patents for a new type of life jacket. In 1919 she opened a factory for production of the Salvus life jackets in Liverpool and London.

Beaumont died on 7 November 1951 and is buried at Karitane Cemetery, Karitane, Otago, New Zealand.

== The Salvus life jacket ==
Beaumont was allegedly motivated to develop a new type of life jacket following the shipwreck that almost claimed the life of her brother Henry Newman in 1863, the presumed death by drowning of her brother William Newman in 1912, and the sinking of the Titanic. William Newman had actually died a few days after an "apoplectic fit" while out boating Otago in 1887. No inquest was held. A newspaper reported Henry Newman's death from a "lung disease" as occurring in 1898.

On 15 April 1912, the RMS Titanic sank with the loss of approximately 1,500 lives. The Convention for the Saving of Life at Sea was adopted in 1914, in response to the Titanic disaster. Article 51(1) states "A life-jacket of an approved type, or other appliance of equal buoyancy and capable of being fitted on the body, shall be carried for every person on board, and, in addition, a sufficient number of life-jackets, or other equivalent appliances, suitable for children." Following the tragedy, the British Board of Trade held a competition calling for the invention of a better life jacket than the cork model currently in use at the time.

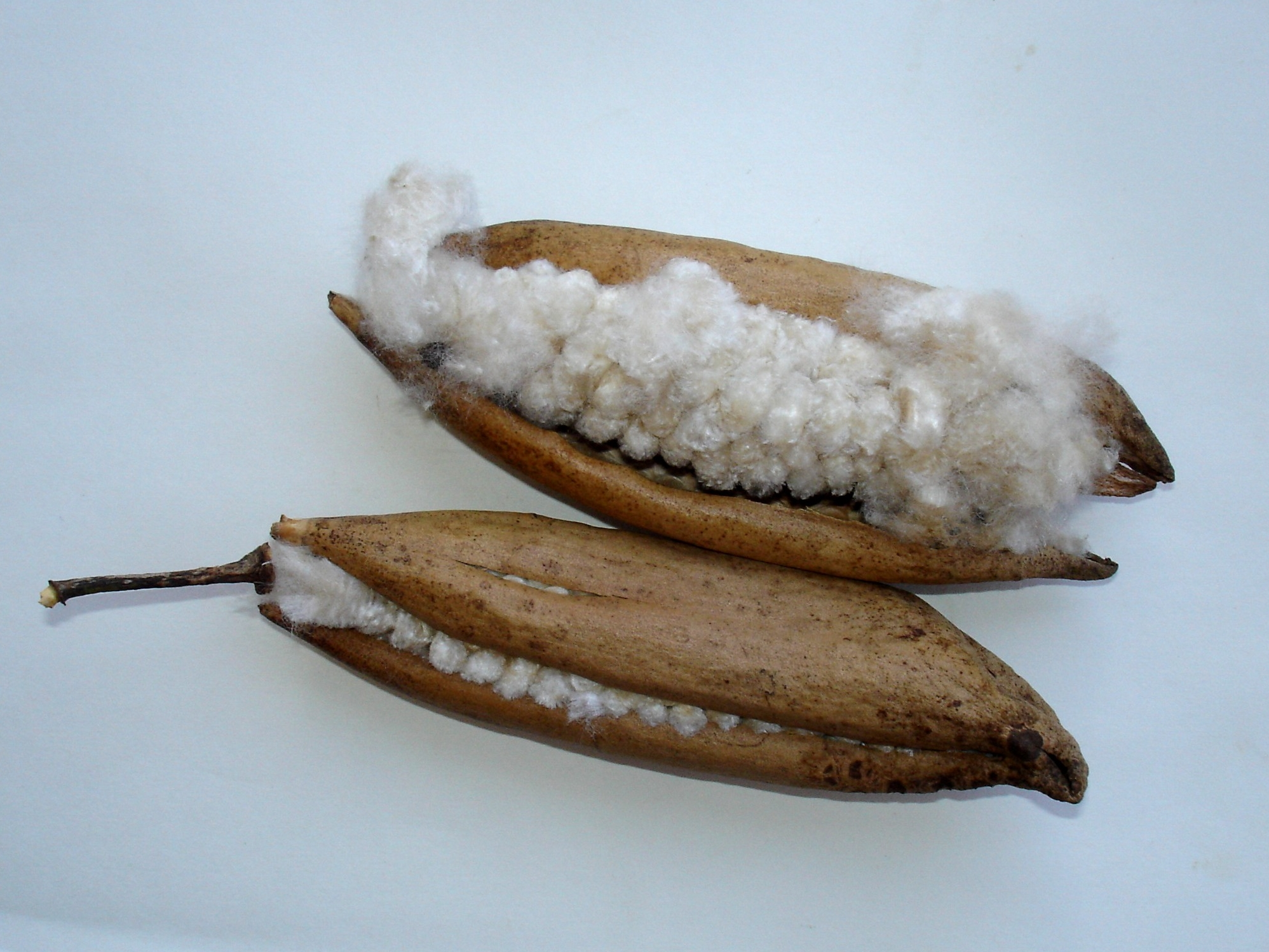
Kapok pods

The Beaumonts designed a cotton vest filled with kapok, a buoyant fibre harvested from the kapok tree; they were inspired to use kapok after observing the floatation qualities of its seedpods when they had travelled through the Pacific. Kapok's hair-like follicles contain natural oils that repel water, trapping air and providing high buoyancy. These lifejackets offered a supporting force 3½ times stronger than cork. The body attachments featured buoyant cushions filled with seedless Java kapok and cork, with tubular hems for strings. If the upper strings were left loose, a space between the front cushion and the wearer could accommodate a baby or small child. A key feature was its ease of use in emergencies.

The British Board of Trade introduced a new regulation to the effect that, before it could be approved, a life-jacket had to satisfy certain required conditions even if it were put on the wearer back to front, or upside down. By April 1919 only five types of life-jackets complied with the conditions, one of which was the New Zealand Salvus. Beaumont opened two factories, in London and in Liverpool. 30,000 life jackets were commissioned and used by the British fleet, the Union Steam Ship Company, and several ferry companies.

The Salvus was eventually superseded by foam-filled life jackets at the beginning of World War II.

== Patents issued ==
Patents were issued in several countries to the Beaumonts for the Salvus life jacket.

| Country | Filing no. | Publication no. | Inventor | Filing date | Publication date |
| New Zealand | 39370 | | Beaumont, Norman | 6 October 1917 | 29 January 1918 |
| Australia | 562217 | | Beaumont, Norman | 30 October 1917 | 23 April 1918 |
| Great Britain | 853517 | 113214 | Beaumont, Orpheus | 14 June 1917 | 14 February 1918 |
| United States | 21495318 | 1270686 | Beaumont, Orpheus | 1 February 1918 | 25 June 1918 |
| France | 492844 | | Beaumont, Orpheus | 10 August 1918 | 19 July 1919 |
| Canada | 189927 | | Beaumont, Orphius | 1 February 1918 | 29 April 1919 |
| Denmark | 24646 | | Orpheus Beaumont, Norman Beaumont | 14 June 1917 | 16 June 1919 |

== Legacy ==
In 2013, a documentary film The Drowning Country was released by Caroline Fitzgerald, Beaumont's great-granddaughter.

In August 2024, Beaumont was one of eight women celebrated by Jersey Post in their "Jersey Women of Achievement" stamp collection. The collection is available until August 2026.
