= Winifred Annie Valentine =

New Zealand educationalist (1886–1968)

Winifred Annie Valentine (1886–1968) was a New Zealand teacher and educationalist. She was born in Waikouaiti, then also known as Hawksbury, Otago, New Zealand in 1886. Winifred completed her teacher training in Dunedin. In 1921 she travelled to Canada under a reciprocal arrangement with the Canadian Educational Authority. She was a fighter for the rights to an education for children with special educational needs. She died in Wellington on 6 August 1968.
