= William Chapman (doctor) =

British surgeon (1797–1867)

- Born: 13 May 1797; Headlam, Durham, England
- Died: 1867 (aged 69–70); Waikouaiti, New Zealand
- Scientific career
- Fields: Medicine

Doctor William Chapman (13 May 1797 – 1867). He was born at Headlam Hall, Durham, the second son of John Chapman Esq. and his wife Mary Chapman (née Robinson) of Alwent Hall in the County of Durham. As a young man, he went to London to train as a medical practitioner. At the age of 30 he married Sarah Lisgo of Durham and they had three sons and four daughters. At an early stage in his life he recognised the necessity for scenic reserves and recreational areas in London and he was appointed a Director of the Kew Botanical Gardens. Later he was instrumental in planting the willows along the Avon River in Christchurch, New Zealand. He was a member of the Royal College of Surgeons.

Being resourceful, they decided to emigrate to New Zealand as there was a need for medical people in the Canterbury settlement. At the age of 53, he and his family embarked on the sailing ship Labuan, on which he was surgeon. This vessel carried 137 passengers bound for Port Cooper (now Lyttelton, port of Christchurch). Dr. Chapman was charged with appointing various staff (including a constable and a matron for single females) from the "most intelligent of the steerage passengers". He was also supplied with 'vaccine lymph' against smallpox and a medicine against cholera (even though the cause of cholera was yet to be discovered in 1854).

As they were not sure of the building possibilities in the new colony, Dr Chapman brought the sections of a house to be erected when they arrived, as well as furniture to furnish it with.

He brought bundles of seeds, plants and shrubs as well as a hive of bees and other items he considered useful for the new settlement. Sadly, soon after they docked, his eldest teenage son died.

From Port Cooper, the family went to Christchurch where Dr Chapman had purchased a 50-acre (20 ha) block of land on Lincoln Road, Addington, from the Canterbury Association for 150 NZ pounds. When he sold it, (selling off various parcels in the next ten years) he made a tidy profit of 1125NZ pounds.

At the behest of Johnny Jones (NZ pioneer/entrepreneur) in 1861, the Chapmans moved to Waikouaiti, as GP for Johnny Jones' settlement there. Dr Chapman worked there until his death. William and Sarah are both buried in St John's churchyard, Waikouaiti.

Two of their daughters married Johnny Jones' sons and became very wealthy women. William and Sarah's son, John Alwent Chapman, never married and became a businessman, moving to Dunedin probably in the early 1870s. He established himself as a mining agent and sharebroker having dealings with the Jones family. Chapman became the postmaster at Waikouaiti upon lodging of a 200NZP bond made by William Chapman and Johnny Jones.
