= Ōkari Lagoon =

Lagoon in New Zealand

- Location within New Zealand
- Location: West Coast, New Zealand
- Coordinates: 41.833°S 171.464°E
- Primary outflows: Tasman Sea

Ōkari Lagoon is a lagoon and estuary in the West Coast, New Zealand, south of Tauranga Bay, and to the east of Nine Mile Beach. The Kawatiri Coastal Trail passes through Ōkari Lagoon.
