= Hawksbury Lagoon =

Nature reserve in New Zealand

Coordinates: 45°36′20″S 170°40′25″E

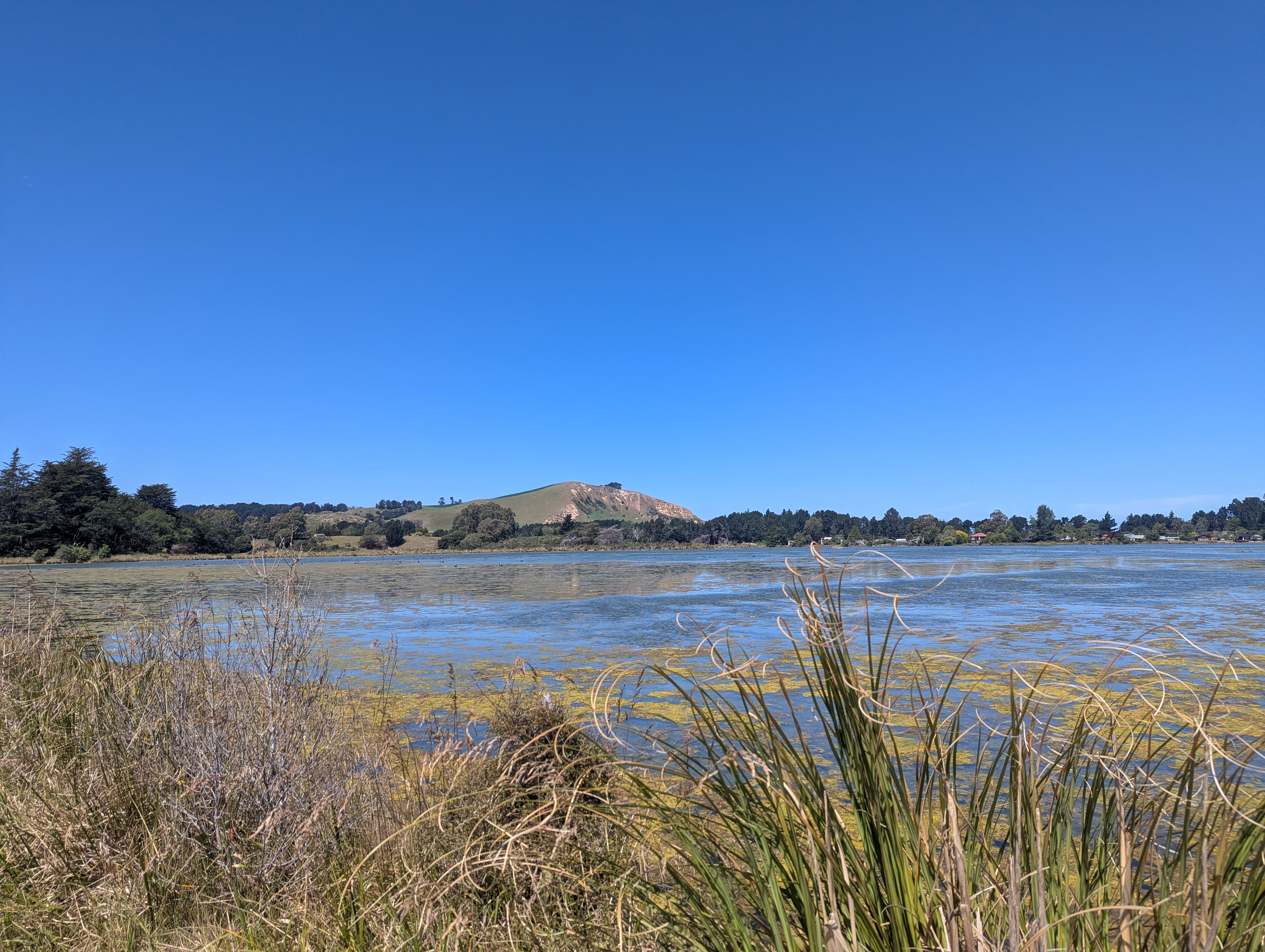
- Hawksbury Lagoon, Waikouaiti
- Interactive map of Hawksbury Lagoon
- Location: Waikouaiti, East Otago, New Zealand
- Nearest city: Waikouaiti
- Area: 51 hectares (130 acres)
- Designation: Wildlife Refuge
- Governing body: Department of Conservation

Hawksbury Lagoon is situated within the East Otago town of Waikouaiti, on the northern boundary of Dunedin City, New Zealand.

It is a designated Wildlife Refuge under the Reserves Act 1977, and is administered by the Department of Conservation (DOC). It is listed as an ‘Area of significance’ within the Dunedin City Council and Otago Regional Council Plans. It is 51 hectares (130 acres) in size, with a perimeter of 5 kilometres (3.1 mi). It is regarded as being a regionally significant wetland.

== Description ==
Hawksbury Lagoon is described by the Otago Regional Council as "A shallow fresh-brackish water lagoon at the mouth of the river, adjacent to the town of Waikouaiti. There is little tidal influence within the lagoon, as a causeway along the channel entrance restricts the entry of seawater." As at 2014 the lagoon was in a eutrophic state.

== Recreation ==
There is a 4 kilometres (2.5 mi) loop walk around the lagoon margins and across causeways.

== Conservation and management ==
Hawksbury Lagoon is administered by the Department of Conservation as a Wildlife Refuge.

Community involvement is provided by the Friends of the Hawksbury Lagoon, a group of local residents formed following the closure of the earlier incorporated society, Hawksbury Lagoon Inc. The group aims to enhance, protect and conserve wildlife and plant habitats within and around the lagoon, and to encourage public interest and appreciation of the area.

The lagoon is subject to management under multiple legislative frameworks, including the Wildlife Act 1953 and the Hawksbury Lagoon Refuge Order 1974.
