= Whakakī Lagoon =

Whakakī lagoon
- Location within North Island
- Location: Wairoa district, Hawkes Bay region, North Island
- Coordinates: 39°2′34″S 177°33′7″E
- Type: Coastal lagoon
- Etymology: From Te Reo Maori, verb: "fill", "filling"
- Surface area: 607 ha (1,500 acres)

Whakakī lagoon is a small coastal lagoon found on the east coast of New Zealand's North Island and is a part of the Hawke's Bay region. The shoreline and sediment bed are mainly composed of sapric soil from nearby farming runoff and lithic sand from the sand bank of the neighboring Whakakī beach.

Whakakī lagoon is in the Hawkes Bay region of the North Island

== Geography ==
Whakaki Lagoon is the largest and easternmost of a string of lagoons which run close to the northern cost of Hawke Bay. Other lagoons in the chain (from west to east) include Ngamotu Lagoon, Ohuia Lagoon, Wairau Lagoon, and Te Paeroa Lagoon.

Whakaki Lagoon is located between State Highway 2 and Whakaki Beach. Because of this both Whakaki lagoon and Whakaki beach are known fishing areas. Whakaki has no or very small outlet to the ocean; during high rainfalls the lagoon needs to be manually let out.

Local folklore says that seven mountains in the nearby area (Hikunui, Iwitea, Korito, Takitaki, Onepoto, Tahutoria, and Tuhara) were a group of seven whales which were turned to stone when they failed to return home.

== Biota ==
=== Flora ===
- Noninvasive Flora
  - Gorse (Ulex europaeus)
  - Sweet briar (Rosa rubiginosa)
  - Boxthorn (Lycium ferocissimum)
  - Marram grass (Amophilla arnearia)
  - Pampas grass (Cortaderia selloana)
  - Lupin (Lupinus arboreus)
  - Iceplant (Carpobrotus edulis)
- Invasive flora
  - Blackberry (Rubus fruticous)
  - Boneseed (Chrysanthemoides monilifera)

=== Fauna ===
- Aquatic fauna
  - Shortfin eel (Anguilla australis)
  - Inanga (Galaxias species)
  - Goldfish/Carp (Carassius auratus)
  - Common bully (Gobiomorphus cotidianus)
- Amphibian fauna
  - Goose species (of family Anatidae)
  - Duck species (of family Anatidae)
  - Common shelduck (of family Anatidae)
- Terrestrial fauna
  - Common rabbit (Oryctolagus cuniculus)
