= Maungawhio Lagoon =

- Location within New Zealand
- Location: Hawke's Bay, New Zealand
- Coordinates: 39°04′15″S 177°52′50″E
- Type: Lagoon
- Primary outflows: Pacific Ocean

Maungawhio Lagoon, previously spelt Mangawhio Lagoon, is a lagoon on the Māhia Peninsula in Hawke's Bay, New Zealand.

It is located at the southern end of the isthmus connecting the peninsula with the rest of the North Island, close to the township of Mahia Beach, and has an outflow to the Pacific Ocean in the east.
