= Waitahora Lagoon =

Lagoon in New Zealand

- Location within Northland Region
- Location: Northland Region, North Island
- Coordinates: 34.456°S 172.802°E
- Basin countries: New Zealand

Waitahora Lagoon is a lake in the Northland Region of New Zealand. It has both saline and freshwater components in its structure.

== See also ==
- List of lakes in New Zealand
