= Waipu Lagoons =

Coastal lagoons near New Plymouth, New Zealand

- Location within New Zealand
- Location: New Plymouth, Taranaki Region, New Zealand
- Coordinates: 39°1′49″S 174°8′9″E
- Type: Coastal lagoons
- Basin countries: New Zealand
- Designation: Local purpose conservation reserve
- Surface area: 2 ha (4.9 acres)

The Waipu Lagoons is a series of small coastal lagoons near the city of New Plymouth in the Taranaki Region of New Zealand. They consist of three lakelets with a combined surface area of about 2 hectares (4.9 acres), located 0.5 kilometres (0.31 mi) from the Tasman Sea, immediately to the east of Bell Block. The lagoons and adjoining wetlands encompass 7.9 hectares (20 acres) and are owned by the New Plymouth District Council as a local purpose conservation reserve.

Bird species found at the reserve include:

- Australasian bittern (Botaurus poiciloptilus) – endangered
- Australian coot (Fulica atra australis)
- Grey teal (Anus gracilis)
- Pūkeko (Porphyrio porphyrio)

Raupo (Typha orientalis), flax (Phormium tenax), and bamboo spike-sedge (Eleocharis sphacelata) are the principal plant species.
