= Waikouaiti River =

River in Otago, New Zealand

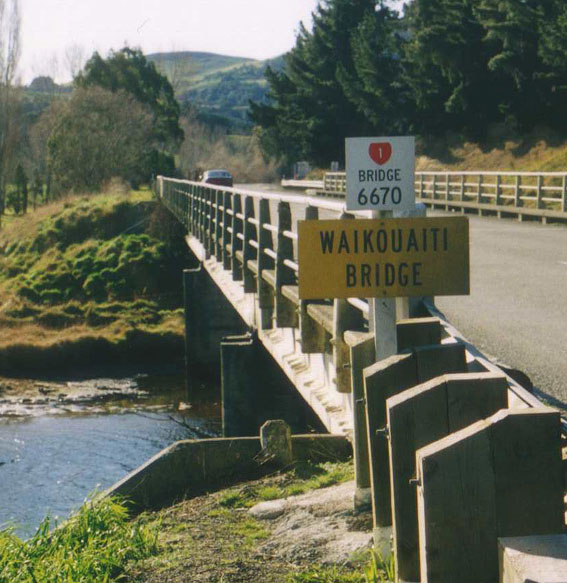
- State Highway 1 crosses the Waikouaiti River between Waikouaiti and Karitane
- Route of the Waikouaiti River
- Mouth of the Waikouaiti River Waikouaiti River (South Island)

Location
- Country: New Zealand

Physical characteristics
- Source: Macraes (North Branch)
  - coordinates: 45.3908°S 170.4263°E
- 2nd source: The Silverpeaks (South Branch)
  - coordinates: 45.7481°S 170.4618°E
- Mouth
  - location: Pacific Ocean
  - coordinates: 45°38′24″S 170°39′42″E

Basin features
- Progression: Waikouaiti River → Pacific Ocean
- Tributaries
  - left: Murphys Creek (North Branch), Toll Bar Creek (South Branch), Sluice Box Creek (South Branch), Mount Misery Creek (South Branch)
  - right: Back Creek (North Branch), Deep Creek (North Branch), Dip Creek (North Branch)

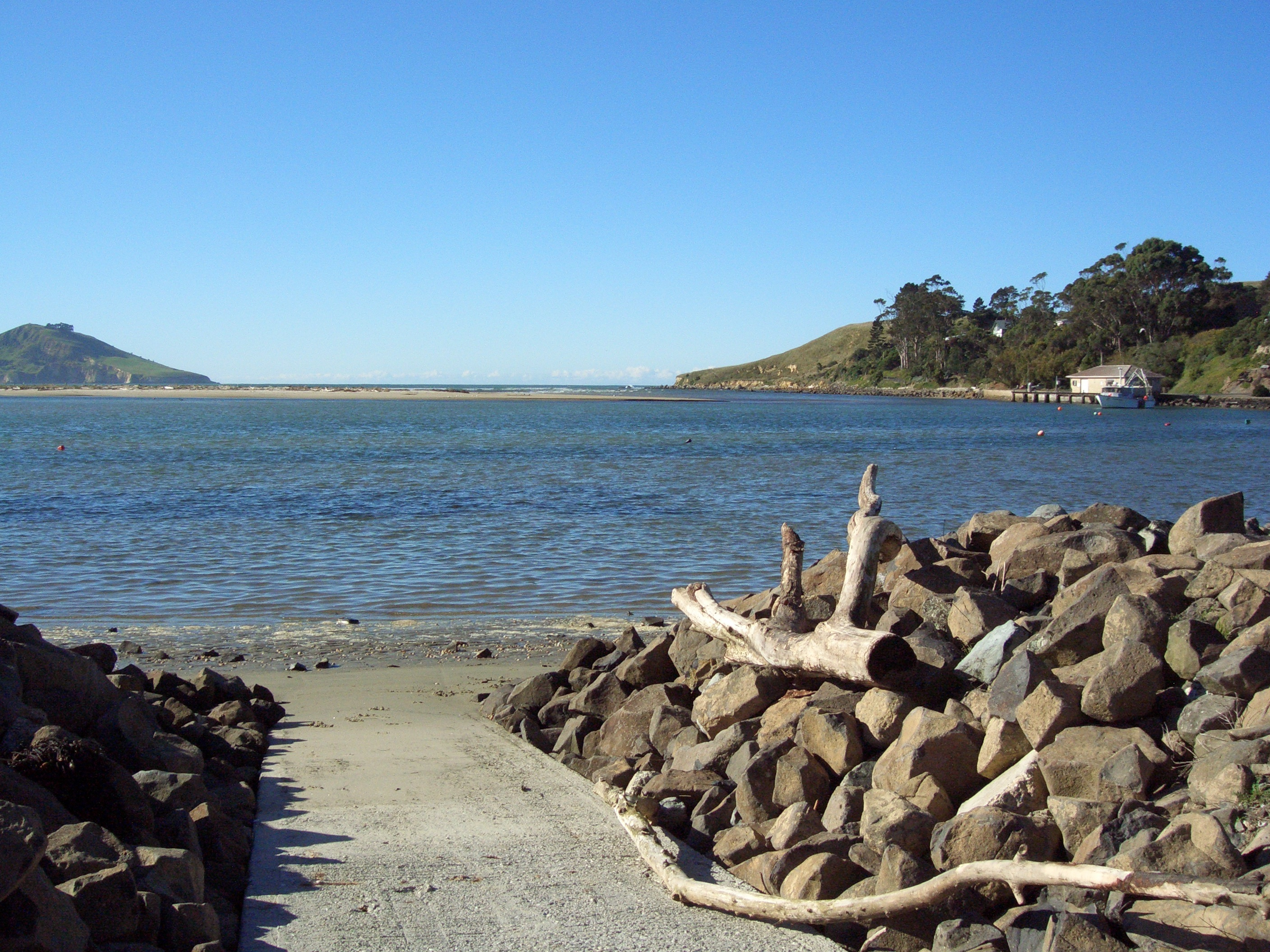
Waikouaiti River estuary at Karitane; fishing wharf and channel to the Pacific Ocean at right, Matanaka headland at left background.

The Waikouaiti River is found to the north of Dunedin in Otago, New Zealand. It flows to the Pacific Ocean at Karitane, close to the town of Waikouaiti.

The Waikouaiti River is the largest river in East Otago.
