= Matanaka Farm =

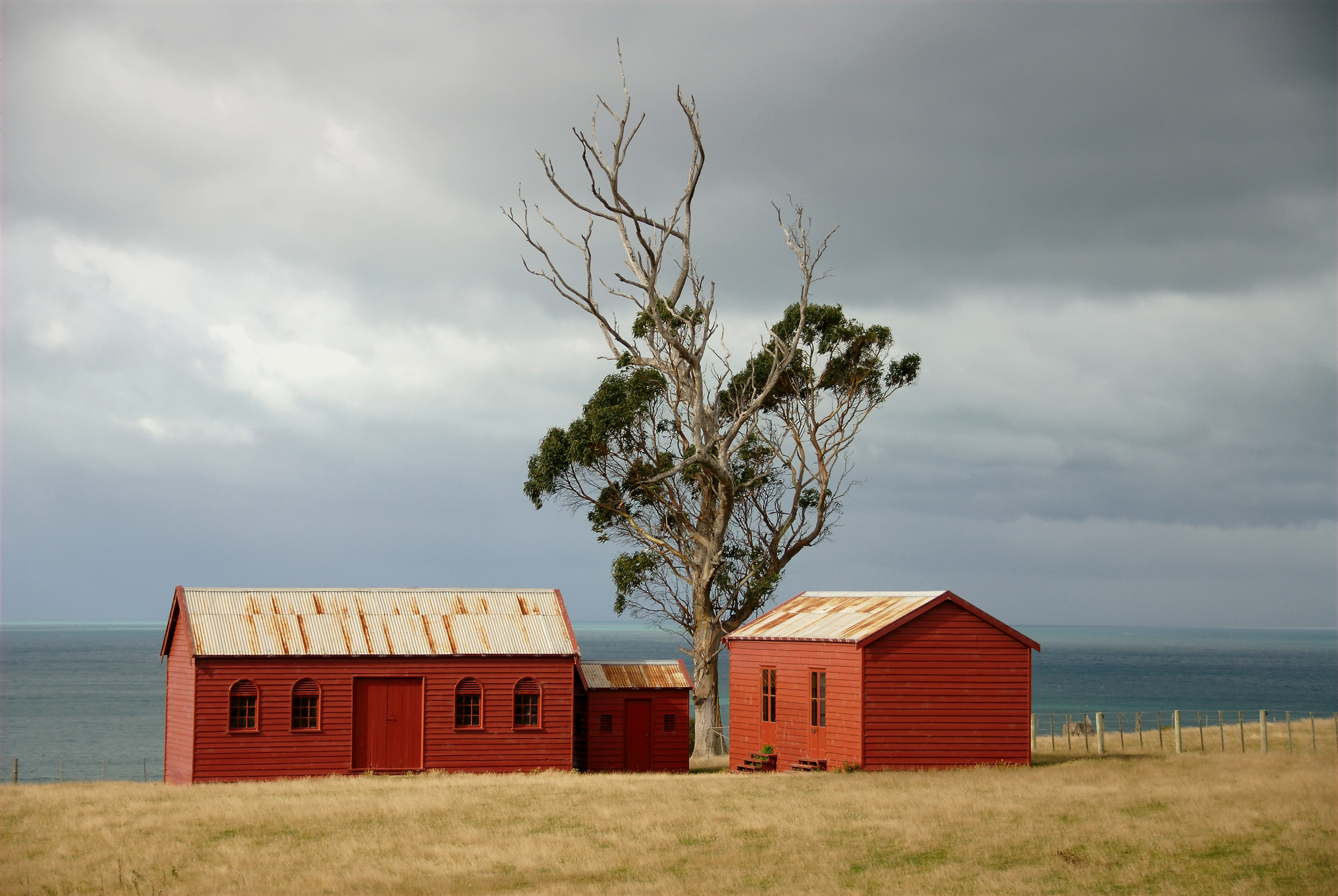
- Matanaka Farm - granary, privy and schoolhouse (from left)
- Interactive map of the Matanaka Farm area
- Alternative names: Matanaka

General information
- Type: Farm buildings
- Location: Private road off Edinburgh Street, Waikouaiti, New Zealand
- Coordinates: 45.6080°S 170.7048°E
- Construction started: 1840
- Renovated: 1977
- Owner: New Zealand Historic Places Trust

Technical details
- Structural system: Timber with galvanised iron roofing
- Floor count: one

Renovating team
- Renovating firm: Ministry of Works

Heritage New Zealand – Category 1
- Designated: 11 December 2009
- Reference no.: 7787

References
- "Matanaka Farm". New Zealand Heritage List/Rārangi Kōrero. Heritage New Zealand.

Matanaka Farm is near Waikouaiti in Otago, New Zealand. The five buildings are the oldest surviving farm buildings that are still in their original position in the country. The farm is owned and administered by Heritage New Zealand. Additionally the buildings are registered as Category I and are considered "historically outstanding".

== History ==
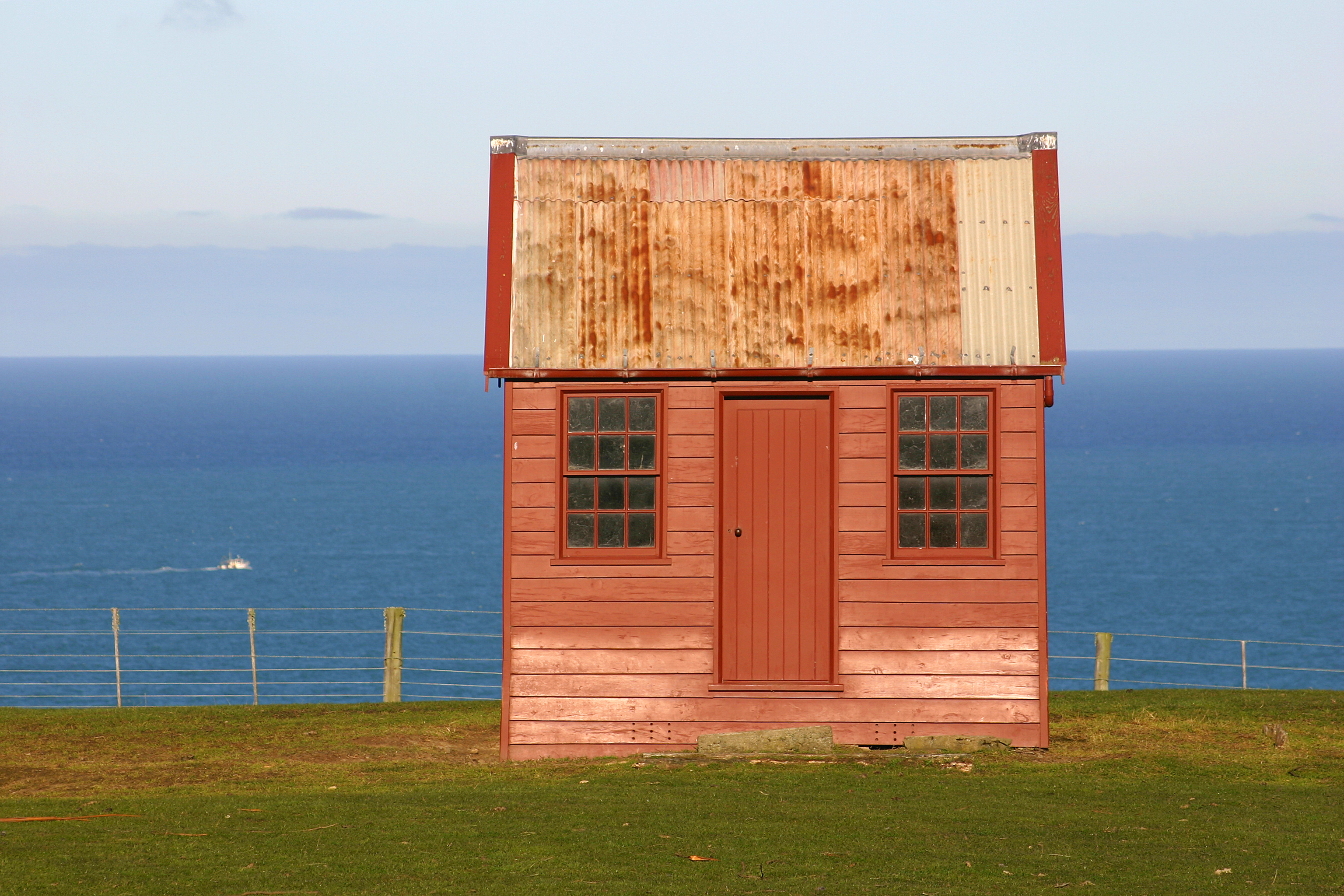
Matanaka Farm building

Matanaka Farm was founded by the Australian whaler Johnny Jones, who had bought the land and an adjoining whaling station in 1838. In April 1840, he brought out about twelve families from Sydney on the Magnet to settle the farm. The first buildings, including the stables, were built in 1840, using materials brought from Sydney. There are accounts from 1841 that mention a collection of barns and accommodation buildings, which allows researchers to date the buildings to that period. Jones himself moved into the farm's homestead in 1843. His wife, Sarah Sizemore, was said to be known as Cherry, and the nearby Cherry Farm is apparently named for her.

When the settlement of Dunedin began in 1848, Jones supplied the new settlers with produce at a "good price". The Jones family moved to Dunedin for the better education opportunities for their children in 1854. Johnny Jones' son William Jones lived at Matanaka Farm until 1858, and it was passed on to the next generation, John Richard Jones and his wife Mary Orbell, who had Matanaka Farm as their home until 1871. Mary Orbell's brother, McLeod Orbell, then leased the farm until 1878.

In February 1878, Matanaka Farm was sold to George McLean. In the late 1880s, McLean leased the farm to Orbell again. Ownership passed in 1892 to the farmer Alexander Bannatyne, whose family owned the farm until 1961. After brief ownership by two individuals, the farm was purchased by Monty Ericson in 1965. The Ericson family gave the Matanaka Farm buildings to the New Zealand Historic Places Trust in 1976. The setting was gazetted as an historic reserve in 1981.

== Heritage registration ==
The land was gazetted as a historic reserve in 1981. The buildings were registered as Category I heritage structures by the New Zealand Historic Places Trust on 11 December 2009 with registration number 7787. The historic homestead is not included in the registration, and is not open to the public. The buildings are the oldest surviving farm buildings in New Zealand that are still in their original position.
