= Johnny Jones (pioneer) =

New Zealand pioneer and trader (1809–1869)

John Jones (March 1809 – 16 March 1869) was a mariner, trader, shipowner and whaler in Sydney and later became a settler in New Zealand.

Born in Sydney, Jones was the third son of Thomas Jones, one of the early settlers in New South Wales. He spent his early life on sealing and whaling ships, before becoming a ferryman at Port Jackson. He had an entrepreneurial streak and invested his savings in a way that by the age of 20, he had interests in three whaling ships. He went on to own 13 such vessels that made 17 whaling voyages from Sydney between 1836 and 1845.

He married Sarah Sizemore on 7 January 1828 in Sydney, and they had 11 children, although two died as infants. John Richard Jones was his eldest son.

In 1835 Jones and Edwin Palmer went into a partnership to purchase a whaling station in New Zealand and a schooner for whaling. Within the next few years, his shrewd business skills allowed him to gain a controlling interest in seven New Zealand whaling stations.

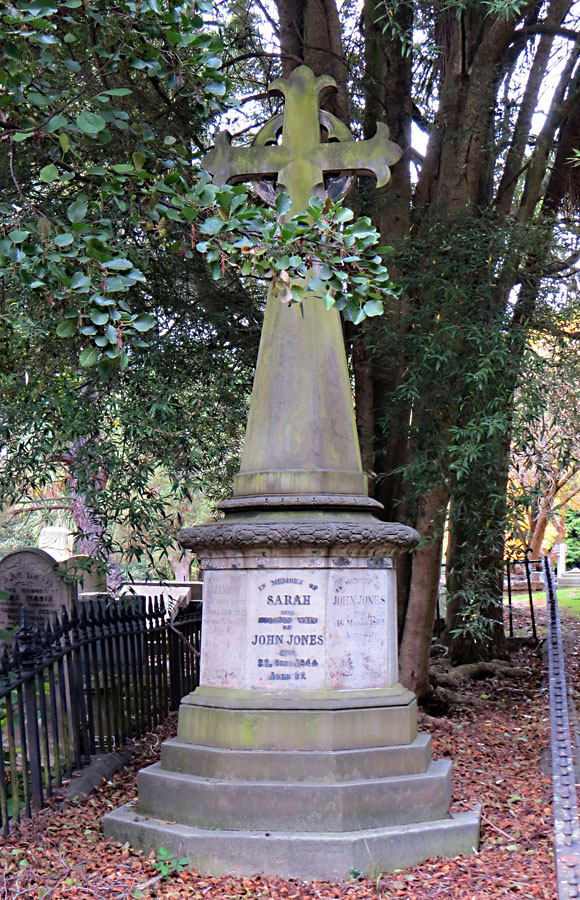
Johnny Jones's tomb in Dunedin Southern Cemetery

In 1838 he bought a whaling station and land near Waikouaiti, and also purchased a large area of land from Ngāi Tahu chief "Bloody Jack" Tūhawaiki, amounting to a considerable part of what is now North and Central Otago. Much of this purchase was later annulled when South Island lands were ceded to the Crown. After long wrangling, Jones was eventually allowed to keep some 11,000 acres (45 km^{2}).

In 1840, Jones' Waikouaiti station became the organised settlement in the eastern South Island known as Matanaka Farm. About a dozen families from Sydney were settled close to the station as a farming community, providing food for the station, growing crops and raising sheep and cattle.

Financial constraints led Jones to move permanently to New Zealand with his family in 1843, dividing his time between Waikouaiti and Wellington. The decline of whaling forced him to close the Waikouaiti station in the late 1840s, and he concentrated on developing his farm which soon became an important food source for the new settlement of Dunedin, where he moved in 1854. During the early days of settlement in Dunedin, Jones' shipping and trading interests set him up as the chief rival to James Macandrew.

In 1861, Jones asked Dr. William Chapman, then of Christchurch, to be the GP for the Waikouaiti community.

During the 1860s, Jones' interests again turned to shipping, firstly as a shareholder of the short-lived Otago Steam Ship Company, and then through his own venture, the Harbour Steam Navigation Company, which served the ports of Dunedin, Port Chalmers, and Oamaru, and later also traded with Hokitika on the West Coast.

Jones had little interest in politics, and refused a position offered by Edward Stafford on the New Zealand Legislative Council. He did, however, serve as chairman of the Dunedin Town Board in 1856. Jones died in Dunedin in 1869, and is buried in the city's Southern Cemetery. His eldest son was an executor of his will and was thus instrumental in the amalgamation of various shipping companies to form the Union Steam Ship Company.

In 1999, Jones was posthumously inducted into the New Zealand Business Hall of Fame.

Jones was an Anglican. Jones left a large bequest in his will to the Diocese of Dunedin for the construction of St. Paul's Cathedral.
