= East Otago =

Coordinates: 45°35′40″S 170°40′20″E

East Otago is the coastal and rural areas of Otago, a region of New Zealand's South Island. It lies north of Dunedin, between The Kilmog and Shag River. The largest town within East Otago is Waikouaiti. The term East Otago is now less commonly used in official contexts, since the city limits of Dunedin were expanded in the 1990s.

As East Otago is not a defined region, getting an exact population number is difficult, however, the population of Waikouaiti as 2024 is 1,310, and the population of Palmerston in 2024 is 1,070
