= Waikouaiti =

Town in Otago, New Zealand

- Town
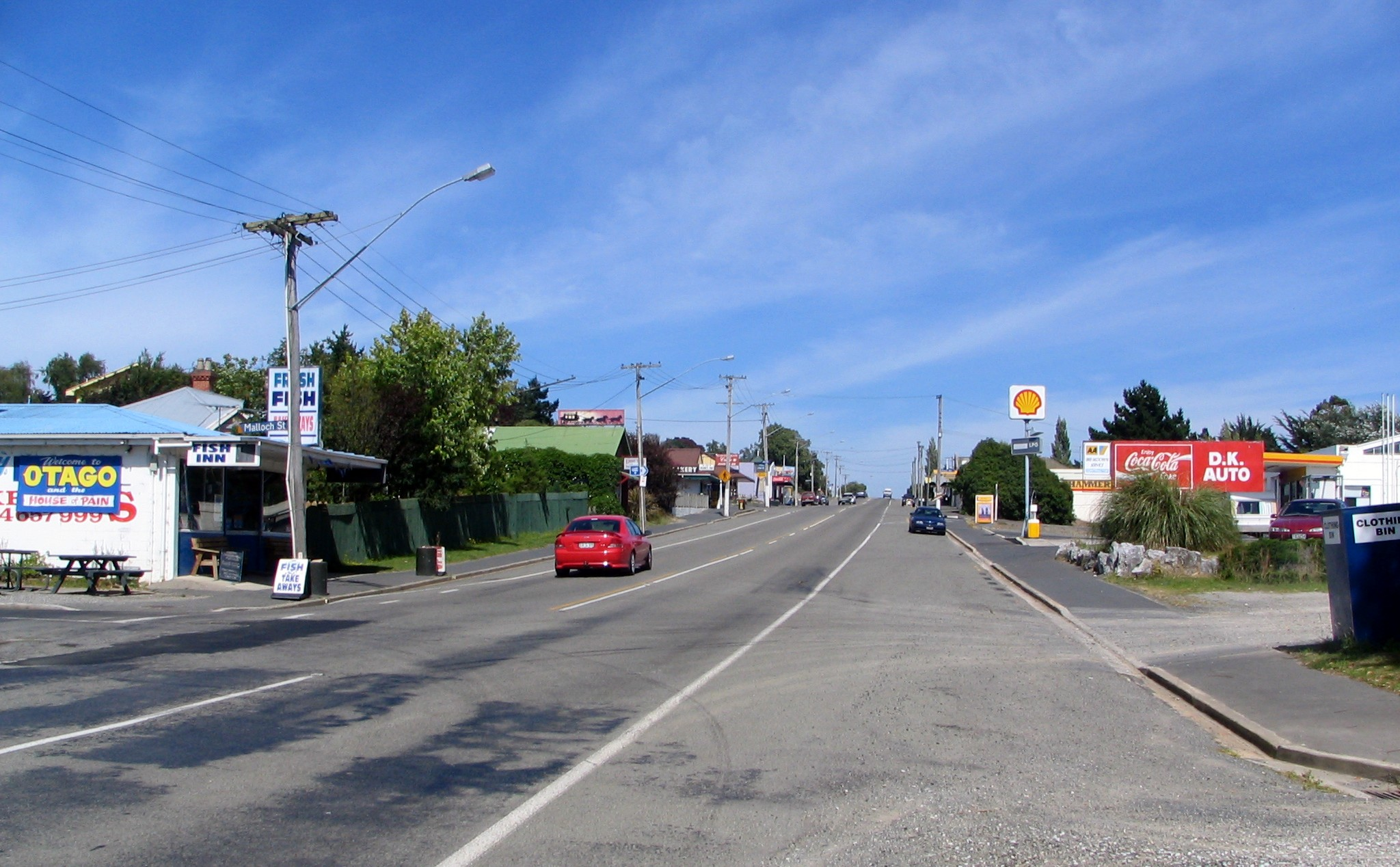
- State Highway 1 at Waikouaiti, looking south
- Interactive map of Waikouaiti
- Coordinates: 45°35′40″S 170°40′20″E
- Country: New Zealand
- Island: South Island
- Region: Otago
- Community board: Waikouaiti Coast Community Board
- Electorates: Dunedin; Te Tai Tonga (Māori)

Government
  - Territorial authority: Dunedin City Council
  - Regional council: Otago Regional Council
  - Mayor of Dunedin: Sophie Barker
  - Dunedin MP: Rachel Brooking
  - Te Tai Tonga MP: Tākuta Ferris

Area
  - Total: 7.33 km^{2} (2.83 sq mi)

Population (June 2025)
  - Total: 1,310
  - Density: 179/km^{2} (463/sq mi)
- Time zone: UTC+12 (NZST)
  - Summer (DST): UTC+13 (NZDT)
- Area code: 03
- Local iwi: Ngāi Tahu

Waikouaiti is a small town in East Otago, New Zealand, within the city limits of Dunedin. The town is close to the coast and the mouth of the Waikouaiti River.

Today, Waikouaiti is a retail trade and servicing centre for the surrounding district, which has sheep farming as the principal primary activity. A major egg producer, Zeagold Foods, a branch of Mainland Poultry LTD has a 500,000-hen factory farming operation here and is in the process of expanding over the next year to meet demand for egg products. Hawksbury, 3 kilometres (1.9 miles) southwest of Waikouaiti, has a cheese factory and shop, a swimming pool and housing developed from the old mental health institution, Cherry Farm. Karitane, 3 km (1.9 mi) to the southeast has a small fishing port.

== History ==
Prior to the arrival of Europeans the area was occupied by Māori, who had a kāinga, or unfortified settlement, at modern Karitane and a pā, or fortified settlement, on the adjacent Huriawa Peninsula.

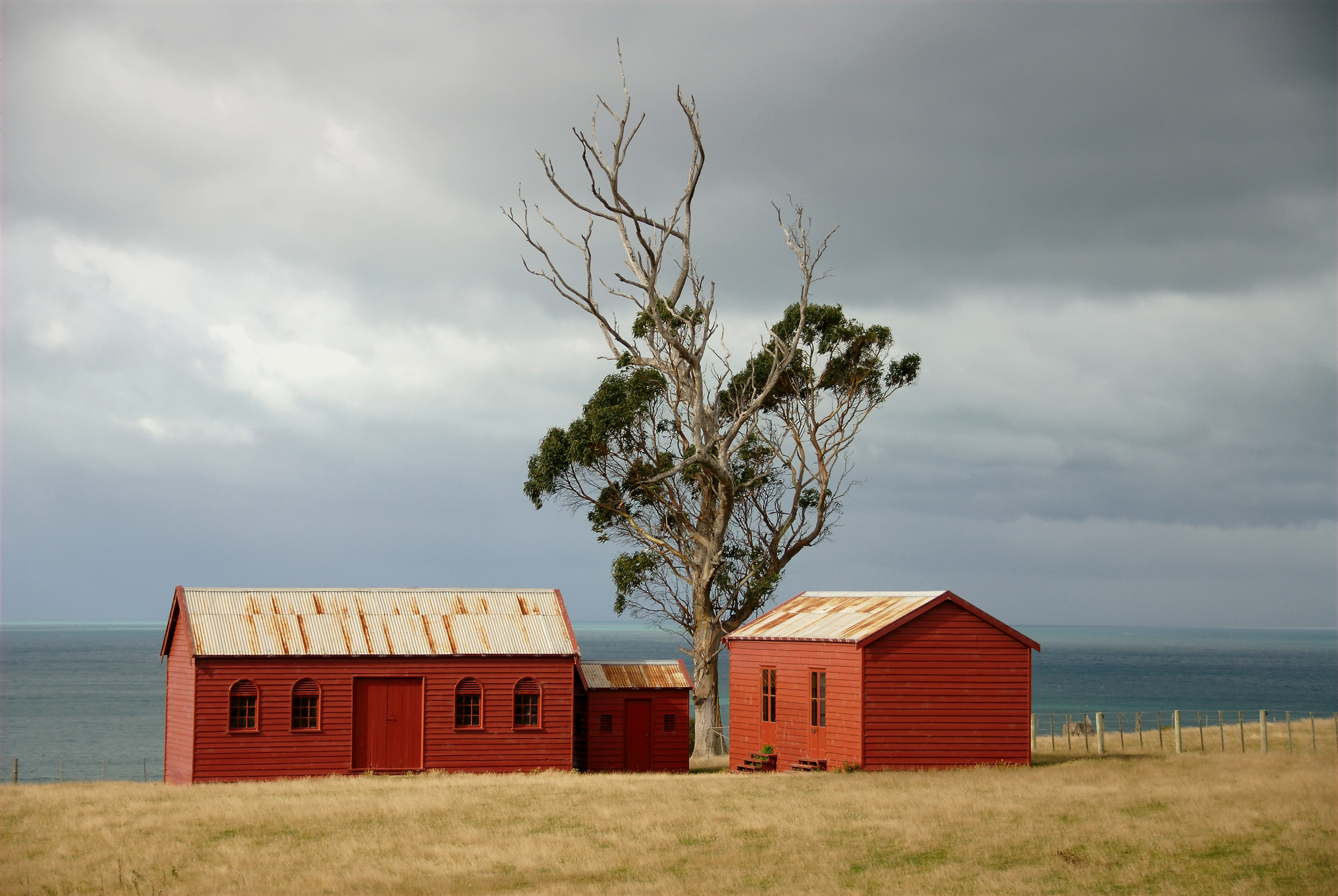
These Matanaka Farm buildings from the 1840s are a Category I registered historic place

An 1826 sketch of the east Otago coast, shows the headlands and beaches of what are now Karitane and Waikouaiti.

Waikouaiti was the first European settlement in southern New Zealand to be mainly based on farming and one of the first enduring European settlements in Otago. From 1837 there had been a whaling station confusingly also called "Waikouaiti" nearby on the south side of the estuary at what is now called "Karitane". Having already purchased large areas of land in the South Island (much of which was later declared to have been invalid) Johnny Jones sent settlers from Sydney, Australia in the Magnet to farm the district in 1840, eight years before the foundation of the Otago Association's settlement. This was the first farm in the Otago region.

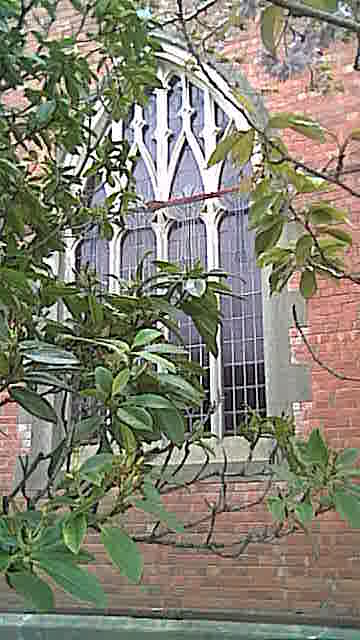
Waikouaiti Presbyterian Church, built 1914, West window.

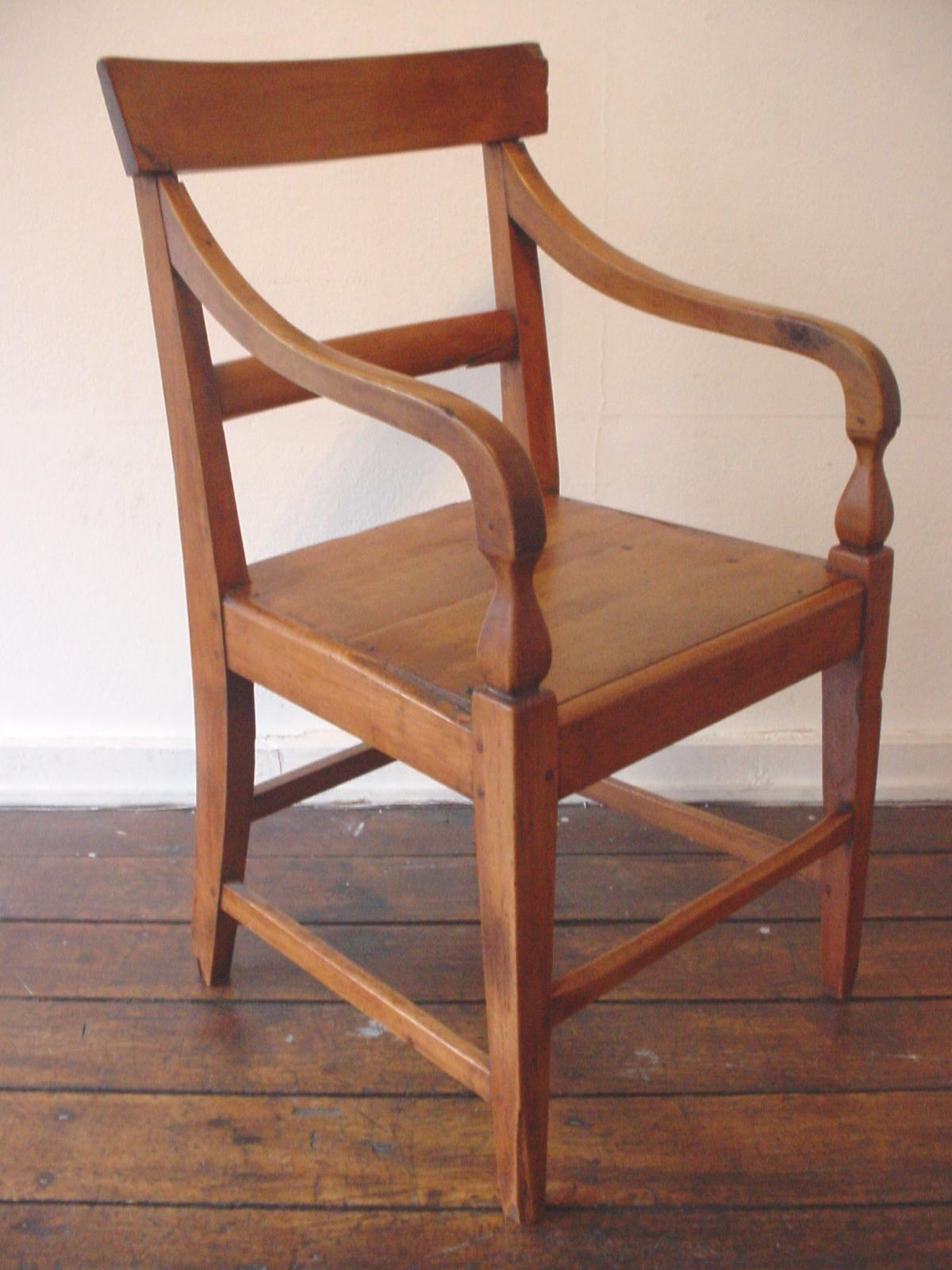
The 'Johnny Jones' chair, a very rare early example of domestic New Zealand made seated furniture.

Jones himself did not move to Waikouaiti until 1843, after financial losses during an economic depression in Sydney. His original homestead and some of the associated buildings of his colonial manor farm, known as Matanaka Farm, which still stand on Cornish Head, date from this time. The farm buildings, though not the homestead, are owned by Heritage New Zealand and are open to the public. They are the oldest surviving farm buildings in New Zealand.

Jones moved to Dunedin in 1854 but was influential in the development of Waikouaiti for many years after. The wooden shingle roofed St. John's Anglican Church in Waikouaiti proper opened in 1858, was funded by Jones. It was designed by Benjamin Mountfort of Christchurch who also designed the Provincial Council Building there. In 1861 Dr. William Chapman, at Jones request, became the first GP for the district.

The Presbyterians built a wooden church in 1863. It was moved to Kildare Street in 1876 and still remains. It became the Sunday School when a brick church was built in 1914, designed by J.Louis Salmond but this building closed in 2008 and was demolished in 2009.

=== 2021 lead poisoning scare ===
In early February 2021, high levels of lead (40 times the acceptable level of 0.01 mg/L) were detected in Waikouaiti and nearby Karitane's drinking water supply. The high levels of lead were first detected on 18 December 2020 but the alert was emailed to a Dunedin City Council staff member who was on holiday. In response, Director-General of Health Ashley Bloomfield offered free blood tests to Karitane and Waikouaiti residents. The Dunedin City Council also dispatched water tanks and staff to assist and reassure local residents. Prime Minister Jacinda Ardern described the lead levels in the two towns as "unacceptable." On 9 February, the City Council distributed free fruits and vegetables to residents of Waikouaiti, Karitane, and Hawksbury due to concerns about eating crops irrigated with the contaminated water.

Following lead scare, the Dunedin City Council announced on 11 February that it would drain a raw water reservoir and replace five kilometres of old pipes in order to reassure residents of Waikouaiti, Karitane and Hawksbury. By 10 March, the Southern District Health Board confirmed that 1,512 people had been tested, with blood test results indicating that nobody had a blood lead level requiring hospitalisation and that long term exposure to lead from the water supply was limited. In July 2021, the City Council removed its recommendation to not drink from the areas water supply.

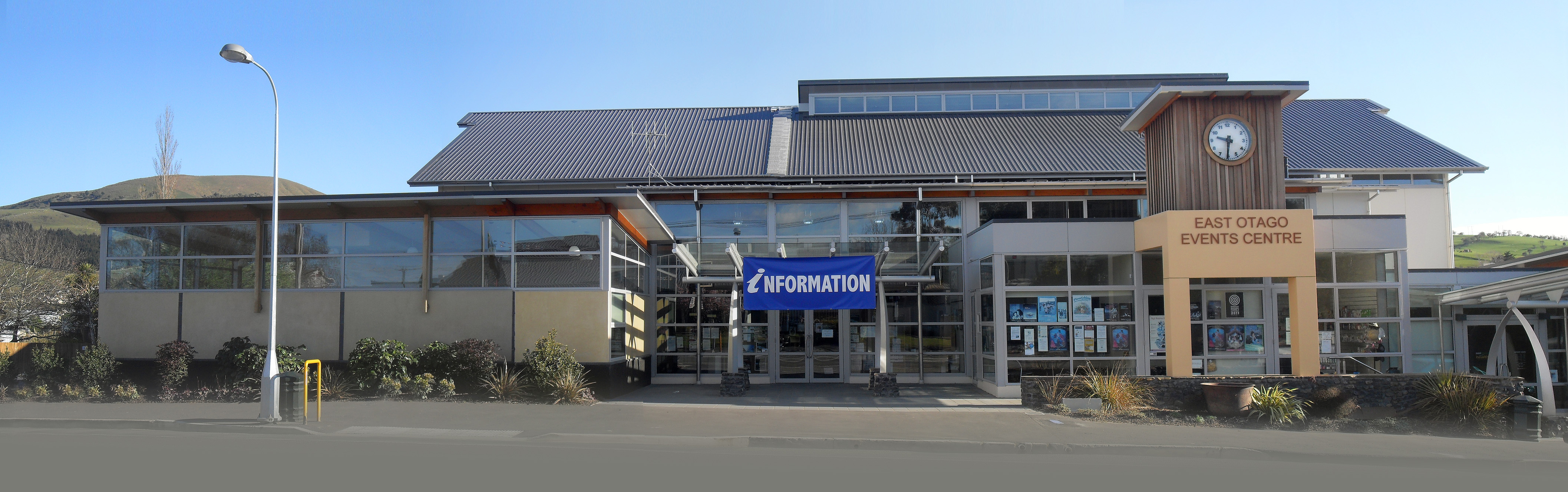
The modern East Otago Events Centre which is used for many community activities

== Place names ==
The town of Waikouaiti was initially called "Hawksbury," a name that still applies to the Hawksbury Lagoon wetland in the centre of the town, known in Māori as Matainaka, and also adopted in the name of the residential/industrial redevelopment at the former Cherry Farm Hospital. The name Waikouaiti is Māori, and is believed to come from phrases meaning "small bitter waters" (wai-kawa-iti) or "braided streamlets" (wai-koua-iti). This placename once applied to a whaling station at Karitane, but subsequently drifted to the present location.

== Demographics ==
Waikouaiti covers 7.33 km^{2} (2.83 sq mi) and had an estimated population of 1,310 as of June 2025, with a population density of 179 people per km^{2}.

Historical population
Year	Pop.	±% p.a.
2006	1,095	—
2013	1,122	+0.35%
2018	1,194	+1.25%

Waikouaiti had a population of 1,194 at the 2018 New Zealand census, an increase of 72 people (6.4%) since the 2013 census, and an increase of 99 people (9.0%) since the 2006 census. There were 552 households, comprising 564 males and 630 females, giving a sex ratio of 0.9 males per female. The median age was 53.6 years (compared with 37.4 years nationally), with 159 people (13.3%) aged under 15 years, 129 (10.8%) aged 15 to 29, 531 (44.5%) aged 30 to 64, and 372 (31.2%) aged 65 or older.

Ethnicities were 94.2% European/Pākehā, 9.0% Māori, 2.0% Pasifika, 2.0% Asian, and 2.0% other ethnicities. People may identify with more than one ethnicity.

The percentage of people born overseas was 14.1, compared with 27.1% nationally.

Although some people chose not to answer the census's question about religious affiliation, 55.5% had no religion, 32.4% were Christian, 0.5% had Māori religious beliefs, 1.0% were Buddhist and 1.8% had other religions.

Of those at least 15 years old, 162 (15.7%) people had a bachelor's or higher degree, and 246 (23.8%) people had no formal qualifications. The median income was $24,200, compared with $31,800 nationally. 138 people (13.3%) earned over $70,000 compared to 17.2% nationally. The employment status of those at least 15 was that 393 (38.0%) people were employed full-time, 156 (15.1%) were part-time, and 24 (2.3%) were unemployed.

== Transport ==
=== Road ===
Waikouaiti is located on State Highway 1 40 kilometres north of Dunedin city centre and 666 kilometres from Picton.

Waikouaiti is serviced by the Dunedin to Palmerston bus service operated by Orbus. The bus operates thrice daily each way Monday to Friday (excluding public holidays).

=== Railway ===
The Main South Line railway between Christchurch and Invercargill passes through Waikouaiti. It was constructed in the 1870s, and daily passenger trains passed through Waikouaiti until the cancellation of the Southerner in February 2002. Currently, the only passenger service is a tourist service operated by the Taieri Gorge Railway. Named the Seasider, it operates between Dunedin and Palmerston, once or twice a week in the summer months and occasionally during winter.

Freight trains operate through Waikouaiti multiple times daily.

== Education ==
Waikouaiti School is a co-educational state contributing primary school for Year 1 to 6 students, with a roll of 90 students as of July 2026. The school first opened in 1860 and moved to the current site in the 1870s.
