= Lake Mokeno =

Lake in New Zealand

- Location within Northland Region
- Location: Northland Region, North Island
- Coordinates: 36.3494°S 174.0605°E
- Basin countries: New Zealand
- Max. length: 1.52 miles (2.45 km)
- Max. width: 0.40 miles (0.64 km)
- Surface area: 154.7 hectares (382 acres)
- Max. depth: 6.5 metres (21 ft)
- Islands: many islands and islets

Lake Mokeno is a lake in the Northland Region of New Zealand. The Lakes380 website gives the size as 159.2 hectares and the depth as 6.2 meters.

== See also ==
- List of lakes in New Zealand
