= Lake Wahakari =

Body of water

- Location within Northland Region
- Location: Northland Region, North Island
- Coordinates: 34.651536°S 172.923976°E
- Catchment area: 809.7 hectares (2,001 acres)
- Basin countries: New Zealand
- Max. length: 1,570 metres (5,160 ft)
- Max. width: 790 metres (2,580 ft)
- Surface area: 90.19 hectares (222.9 acres)
- Average depth: 6.04 metres (19.8 ft)
- Max. depth: 12.7 metres (42 ft)

Lake Wahakari is a lake in the Northland Region of New Zealand.

== See also ==
- List of lakes in New Zealand
