= Whau Valley Reservoir =

Reservoir in New Zealand

Coordinates: 35.709°S 174.288°E

Whau Valley Reservoir is a reservoir in Whangārei.

The reservoir is attached to the Whau Valley Water Treatment Plant, which supplies all reservoirs in Whangārei with water. The reservoir can hold 1,871,286 cubic meters of water, a maximum reached in 2024 despite low rainfall. While boats on the water aren't allowed, the public can fish from the sides of the reservoir. The lake is populated annually with 300 rainbow trout.

== See also ==
- List of lakes of New Zealand
