= Rotopouri =

Lake in New Zealand

- Location within Northland Region
- Location: Northland Region, North Island
- Coordinates: 36.302805°S 174.0883315°E
- Basin countries: New Zealand

Rotopouri is a lake close to Kaipara Harbour in the north of New Zealand's Northland Region.

== See also ==
- List of lakes in New Zealand
