= Lake Kapoai =

Lake in New Zealand

- Location within Northland Region
- Location: Northland Region, North Island
- Coordinates: 36.0468°S 173.8326°E
- Basin countries: New Zealand

Lake Kapoai is a lake in the Northland Region of New Zealand.

== See also ==
- List of lakes in New Zealand
