= List of marae in the Northland Region =

This is a list of lists of marae (Māori meeting grounds) in the Northland Region of New Zealand.

In October 2020, the Government committed $9,287,603 from the Provincial Growth Fund to upgrade 34 marae, with the intention of creating 388 jobs.

== Far North District ==
Marae name	Wharenui name	Iwi and Hapū	Location
Akerama	Huiarau / Ruapekapeka	Ngāpuhi (Ngāti Hau)	Akerama
Aputerewa	Te Puna Roimata	Ngāti Kahu (Ngāti Takiora / Ngāi Tauurutakaware)	Aputerewa
Te Arohanui / Mangataipa	Te Arohanui	Ngāpuhi (Kōhatutaka, Te Uri Māhoe), Te Rarawa (Kōhatutaka, Tahāwai, Te Ihutai)	Mangataipa
Haiti-tai-marangai Marae	Haiti-tai-marangai	Ngāti Kahu (Te Rorohuri / Te Whānau Moana)	Karikari Peninsula
Hiruhārama Hou Marae	Hiruharama Hou	Ngāpuhi (Ngāti Rēhia)	Te Tii
Horomanga Marae	Horomanga	Ngāpuhi (Ngāti Hine)	Pokapu
Te Huehue Marae	Te Huehue	Ngāpuhi (Ngāi Tāwake ki te Waoku)	Mataraua
Te Hungāiti	No wharenui	Ngāpuhi (Ngāti Moerewa, Ngāti Rangi)	Tautoro
Te Hūruhi	Ngāti Māhia	Ngāpuhi (Ngāti Hine, Ngāti Māhia)	Awarua
Te Iringa / Parihaka	Parihaka	Ngāpuhi (Ngāti Hinemutu, Ngāti Tautahi)	Te Iringa
Te Kauhanga	Te Poho o Ngāti Kahu	Ngāti Kahu (Te Paatu ki Pēria)	Peria
Kahukura Ariki Marae	Kahukura Ariki	Ngāti Kahu ki Whangaroa (Hāhi Katorika), Ngāpuhi / Ngāti Kahu ki Whaingaroa (Ngāti Kohu)	Waitaruke
Kaikou	Eparaima Makapi	Ngāpuhi (Ngāti Hine)	Kaikou
Kaimaumau	No wharenui	Ngāi Takoto	Kaimaumau
Kaingahoa Mataraua	Tūmanako	Ngāpuhi (Ngāi Tāwake ki te Waoku, Ngāti Rangi)	Mataraua
Kaingahoa Rāwhiti	Tūmanako	Ngāpuhi (Patukeha)	Rāwhiti
Kareponia	Patukoraha	Ngāti Kahu (Patu Kōraha)	Kareponia
Karepori Marae	Karepori	Ngāti Kahu (Matakairiri / Pikaahu)	Taipā
Kāretu Marae	Ngāti Manu	Ngāpuhi (Ngāti Manu, Te Uri Karaka)	Karetu
Karikari Marae	No wharenui	Ngāti Kahu (Te Whānau Moana)	Karikari Peninsula
Kawiti Marae	Te Tawai Riri Maihi Kawiti	Ngāpuhi (Ngāti Hine)	Waiomio
Kēnana	Te Ranginui	Ngāti Kahu (Matarahurahu)	Kenana
Te Kotahitanga Marae	Te Kotahitanga	Ngāpuhi (Ngāti Kura, Ngāti Tautahi, Ngāti Whakaeke, Takoto Kē, Te Uri o Hua)	Whangape
Ko Te Ahua Marae	Ko Te Ahua	Ngāti Kahu (Ngāti Te Rūrunga / Te Paatu)	Toatoa
Kohewhata	Puhi Moana Ariki	Ngāpuhi (Ngāti Kura, Takoto Kē, Te Uri o Hua)	
Kōkōhuia / Ōmāpere	Te Whakarongotai	Ngāpuhi (Ngāti Korokoro, Ngāti Te Pou, Ngāti Whārara, Te Poukā)	Ōmāpere
Kororareka Marae	No wharenui	Ngāpuhi (Te Kapotai)	Russell
Koroukore	Ngāti Moroki	Te Rarawa (Ngāti Moroki)	Ahipara
Te Maata	Te Whare Huinga	Ngāpuhi (Ngāti Moerewa, Ngāti Rangi)	Tautoro
Mahimaru	Te Whakamomoringa	Ngāi Takoto	Awanui
Māhuri Marae	Mahuri	Ngāpuhi (Ngāti Pākau, Te Māhurehure)	Taheke
Manukau Marae	Whakamaharatanga	Te Rarawa (Patupinaki, Ngāti Hine, Patupinaki)	Manukau North
Mangaiti	Tau te Rangimarie	Ngāpuhi / Ngāti Kahu ki Whaingaroa (Ngāti Pākahi, Ngāti Uru)	Kaeo
Mangamuka Marae	Mangamuka	Ngāpuhi (Kōhatutaka, Te Uri Māhoe)	Mangamuka
Mangataiore	No wharenui	Ngāti Kahu (Ngāti Taranga)	Mangataiore
Mangatōwai	No wharenui	Ngāpuhi / Ngāti Kahu ki Whaingaroa (Ngāti Aukiwa), Ngāti Kahu ki Whangaroa (Ngāti Aukiwa)	Akatarere
Mātai Aranui Marae	Matai Aranui	Ngāpuhi (Ngāti Kairewa, Ngāti Kerewheti, Ngāti Te Pou, Te Hikutu, Te Whānau Whero)	Whirinaki
Mataitaua	Ngāti Toro	Ngāpuhi (Ngāti Toro)	
Matauri / Te Tāpui	Ngāpuhi	Ngāpuhi (Ngāti Kura, Ngāti Miru), Ngāpuhi / Ngāti Kahu ki Whaingaroa (Ngāti Kura)	Matauri Bay
Matawaia	Rangimarie	Ngāpuhi (Ngāti Hine, Ngāti Ngāherehere, Te Kau i Mua)	Matawaia
Matihetihe Marae	Tū Moana	Te Rarawa (Taomaui)	Matihetihe
Mātoa	No wharenui	Ngāpuhi (Ngāti Rēhia, Ngāti Whakaeke)	Matoa
Miria Marae	Te Rapunga	Ngāpuhi (Ngāti Hine)	Waiomio
Moehau Marae	Moehau	Ngāpuhi (Te Māhurehure)	Moehau, Northland
Mohinui	Hohourongo	Ngāpuhi (Ngāti Hine, Ngāti Kahu o Torongare)	Waiomio
Mokonuiārangi Marae	Mokonuiārangi	Ngāpuhi (Ngāi Tāwake ki te Moana, Ngāti Toro, Te Ngahengahe)	Maraeroa
Mōrehu	Kurahaupō	Te Rarawa (Te Uri o Tai)	Pawarenga
Mōria Marae	Mōria	Ngāpuhi (Ngāti Kairewa, Ngāti Kerewheti, Ngāti Te Pou, Ngāti Tuapango, Te Hikutu, Te Whānau Whero)	Whirinaki
Mōtatau Marae	Manu Koroki	Ngāpuhi (Ngāti Hine, Ngāti Te Tāwera)	Motatau
Motukiore	Arohamauora	Ngāpuhi (Ngāti Toro, Te Māhurehure, Te Ngahengahe)	Motukiore
Motuti	Tamatea	Te Rarawa (Ngāti Tamatea, Ngāti Te Maara, Te Kai Tutae)	Motuti
Te Ngaere	Ngāi Tupango te Hapū	Ngāpuhi / Ngāti Kahu ki Whaingaroa (Ngaitupango)	Te Ngaere
Ngāi Tāwake Marae	Ngāi Tawake	Ngāpuhi (Ngāi Tāwake ki te Waoku)	Mataraua
Ngāi Tupoto	Ngāhuia	Te Rarawa (Ngāi Tūpoto, Ngāti Here)	Motukaraka
Ngāti Manawa / Te Waiariki	Te Rarawa	Te Rarawa (Ngāti Manawa, Te Kai Tutae, Te Waiariki)	Panguru
Ngāti Moetonga / Wainui	Ngāti Moetonga	Te Rarawa (Ngāti Moetonga, Te Rokeka)	Wainui Junction
Ngāwhā Marae	E Koro Kia Tutuki	Ngāpuhi (Ngāti Kiriahi, Ngāti Mau, Ngāti Rangi, Te Uri Hoatau, Te Uri Taniwha)	Ngawha
Ōhākī	Te Urunga Moutonu / Maru o te Huia	Te Rarawa (Te Uri o Tai)	Pawarenga
Ōkorihi	Burned down in 2003	Ngāpuhi (Ngāti Hinemutu, Ngāti Tautahi, Ngāti Ueoneone)	Te Iringa
Oromāhoe Marae	Ngāti Kawa	Ngāpuhi (Ngāti Kawa, Ngāti Rāhiri)	Oromahoe
Ōtangaroa (Mangawhero)	Te Aroha	Ngāti Kahu ki Whangaroa (Ngāti Rangimatamomoe, Te Hōia)	Ōtangaroa
Ōtātara	Ohinewai	Ngāpuhi (Te Māhurehure)	Waima Valley
Ōtiria	Tūmatauenga	Ngāpuhi (Ngāti Hine, Ngāti Kōpaki, Ngāti Te Ara)	Otiria
Ōturu	Kia Mataara	Ngāti Kahu (Ngāi Tohianga)	Oturu
Taemāro	No wharenui	Ngāti Kahu ki Whangaroa (Ngāti Roha)	Taemāro
Te Pā a Parore	Te Pā A Parore	Ngāi Takoto	Paparore
Te Paatu	Piri ki Te Paatu	Ngāti Kahu (Te Paatu ki Pamāpūria)	Pamapuria
Pā te Aroha Marae	Pā te Aroha	Ngāpuhi (Ngāti Kairewa, Ngāti Kerewheti, Ngāti Te Pou, Ngāti Tuapango, Te Hikutu, Te Whānau Whero)	Whirinaki
Pākanae	Maraeroa	Ngāpuhi (Ngāti Korokoro, Ngāti Whārara, Te Poukā)	Pākanae
Pākaru-ki te Rangi	No wharenui	Ngāpuhi (Ngāti Manu)	
Parapara Marae	Te Manawa o Ngāti Tara	Ngāti Kahu (Ngāti Tara ki Parapara)	Parapara
Parawhenua Marae	Parawhenua	Ngāpuhi (Ngāti Hineira, Ngāti Korohue, Te Uri Taniwha, Te Whanauwhero)	Te Ahuahu
Paremata Marae	Paremata	Ngāpuhi (Ngāti Hao, Ngāti Toro)	
Paripari Marae	Paripari	Ngāpuhi (Ngāi Tāwake ki te Waoku)	Otaua
Pateoro / Te Karae	Pōwhiri, Te Rarawa / Te Ihutai	Te Rarawa (Te Ihutai)	Kohukohu
Te Pātūnga	Te Watea	Ngāpuhi / Ngāti Kahu ki Whaingaroa (Ngāti Pākahi, Ngāti Uru, Te Aeto, Whānau Pani)	Kaeo
Pikiparia	Ngarunui	Te Rarawa (Te Ihutai)	Kohukohu
Piki te Aroha / Rāhiri	Whakapono	Ngāpuhi (Ngāi Tāwake ki te Moana, Ngāi Tāwake ki te Tuawhenua, Ngāti Hao, Ngāti Toro)	Horeke
Te Pīti / Ōmanaia	Te Piiti	Ngāpuhi (Ngāti Hau, Ngāti Te Pou)	Omanaia
Pōtahi	Waimirirangi / Haere-ki-te Rā	Te Aupōuri	Te Kao
Pukerātā / Ōtaua	Te Rau Tawainui	Ngāpuhi (Ngāi Tāwake, Ngāi Tū Te Auru)	Otaua
Puketawa	No wharenui	Ngāpuhi (Ngāi Tāwake ki te Moana, Ngāti Hao, Ngāti Toro, Te Honihoni)	Horeke
Pupuke	Te Huia	Ngāpuhi / Ngāti Kahu ki Whaingaroa (Ngāti Pākahi, Ngāti Uru, Whānau Pani)	Kaeo
Rangatahi Marae	Maraeroa	Ngāpuhi (Ngāti Toro, Te Honihoni, Te Popoto, Ngahengahe)	Maraeroa
Rangikohu	Ruia te Aroha	Te Rarawa (Ngāti Kurī, Te Aupōuri)	Herekino
Te Rarawa Marae	Te Rarawa	Te Rarawa (Ngāti Te Ao, Te Uri o Hina)	Pukepoto
Te Rāwhiti / Omakiwi	Te Rāwhiti	Ngāpuhi (Ngāti Kuta, Patukeha)	Rāwhiti
Rāwhitiroa / Te Ahuahu Marae	Rawhitiroa	Ngāpuhi (Ngāti Hineira, Te Kapotai, Te Popoto, Te Uri Taniwha)	Ōhaeawai
Te Raukura Marae	No wharenui	Ngāpuhi (Te Māhurehure, Te Rauwera)	Waima
Te Reo Mihi Marae	Te Reo Mihi	Ngāti Kurī	Te Hapua
Te Rito Marae	Te Rito	Ngāpuhi (Ngāti Hine)	Moerewa
Roma Marae	Te Ōhākī	Te Rarawa (Ngāti Pākahi, Ngāti Waiora, Parewhero, Te Patukirikiri)	Ahipara
Tahawai Marae	Te Awaroa	Ngāpuhi / Ngāti Kahu ki Whaingaroa (Tahaawai)	Kaeo
Tāheke Marae	Tāhekeroa	Ngāpuhi (Ngāti Pākau, Ngāti Rauwawe, Te Māhurehure)	Tāheke
Taiao	Mātaatua	Te Rarawa (Te Uri o Tai)	Pawarenga
Takahue Marae	Ōkakewai	Ngāti Kahu (Te Tahawai)	Takahue
Tākou Marae	Te Whetū Marama	Ngāpuhi (Ngāti Rēhia, Ngāti Tautahi, Ngāti Tūpango, Ngāti Whakaeke), Ngāpuhi / Ngāti Kahu ki Whaingaroa (Ngāti Rēhia)	Takou Bay
Taupō Marae	Te Tiriti	Ngāpuhi / Ngāti Kahu ki Whaingaroa (Ngatirua), Ngāti Kahu ki Whangaroa (Hāpeta, Ngāti Kaitangata and Ngāti Rua	Taupō Bay
Tauratumaru Marae	Tahere	Ngāpuhi (Ngāi Tāwake ki te Moana, Ngāti Toro, Tauratumaru, Te Honihoni, Te Popoto)	Horeke
Tauteihiihi / Ngātokimatawhaorua	Toki Mata Hourua	Te Rarawa (Te Ihutai)	Kohukohu
Tauwhara	Te Rangiawhiowhio	Ngāpuhi (Ngāi Tāwake, Ngāti Hineira, Ngāti Rēhia, Ngāti Tawake ki te Tuawhenua, Whānautara)	Waimate North
Tereawatea Marae	Tereawatea	Ngāpuhi (Ngāti Hine)	Moerewa
Te Tii Waitangi	Te Tiriti o Waitangi	Ngāpuhi (Ngāti Kawa, Ngāti Rāhiri)	Waitangi
Tuhirangi Marae	Tuhirangi	Ngāpuhi (Te Māhurehure)	Waima
Te Uri o Hina Marae	Hohourongo	Te Rarawa (Ngāti Te Ao, Tahāwai, Te Uri o Hina)	Pukepoto
Ururangi Marae	Ururangi	Ngāpuhi (Ngāti Māhia)	Awarua
Waihapa	Te Tai Tokerau	Ngāti Kahu ki Whangaroa (Riwhi, Te Pania), Ngāpuhi / Ngāti Kahu ki Whaingaroa (Ngāti Rangimatamomoe, Whānau Pani)	Kaeo
Waihou / Waimirirangi	Te Puna o te Ora	Te Rarawa (Ngāti Te Rēinga)	Lower Waihou
Te Whakamaharatanga / Waimamaku	Whakamaharatanga	Ngāpuhi (Ngāti Korokoro, Ngāti Te Pou), Te Roroa	Waimamaku
Waikarā	Te Uaua	Te Roroa	Aranga
Waikare / Te Tūruki	Te Huihuinga / Te Aranga o te Pā	Ngāpuhi (Ngāti Pare, Te Kapotai)	Waikare
Waimahana Marae	Te Puhi o Te Waka	Ngāti Kahu ki Whangaroa (Ngāti Aukiwa, Waimahana, Riwhi and Te Pania), Ngāpuhi / Ngāti Kahu ki Whaingaroa (Ngāti Aukiwa)	Waimahana Bay
Waimangaro	No wharenui	Ngāpuhi (Te Uri Ongaonga)	Opua
Waimanoni	Wikitoria	Ngāi Takoto	Awanui
Wainui Marae	Ngātiruamahue	Ngāpuhi / Ngāti Kahu ki Whaingaroa (Ngāti Ruamahue)	Ahipara
Waiora Marae	Waiora	Ngāti Kurī	Ngataki
Waiparera	Nukutawhiti	Te Rarawa (Patutoka, Tahāwai, Te Whānau Pani, Te Hokokeha)	Kohukohu
Waipuna	Te Puna o Te Ao Marama	Te Rarawa (Te Kai Tutae, Te Waiariki)	Panguru
Waitangi Upper Marae	Te Whare Runanga	Ngāpuhi (Ngāti Kawa, Ngati Moko, Ngāti Rāhiri)	Waitangi
Waitāruke Marae	Kahukura Ariki	Ngāti Kahu ki Whangaroa (Hāhi Katorika)	Kaeo
Waitetoki	No wharenui	Ngāti Kahu (Ngāti Ruaiti)	Hihi
Waiwhatawhata / Aotea	Te Kaiwaha	Ngāpuhi (Ngāti Korokoro, Ngāti Whārara, Te Poukā)	Ōmāpere
Werowero	No wharenui	Ngāti Kahu (Ngāti Tara ki Werowero)	Karikari Peninsula
Whakaari Marae	No wharenui	Ngāpuhi / Ngāti Kahu ki Whaingaroa (Ngāti Kawau)	Kaeo
Wharengaere	No wharenui	Ngāpuhi (Ngāti Mau, Ngāti Torehina)	Purerua Peninsula
Whitiora Marae	Te Ranga Tira Tanga	Ngāpuhi (Ngāti Rēhia)	Te Tii

== Kaipara District ==
Marae name	Wharenui name	Iwi and Hapū	Location
Ahikiwi Marae	Te Aranga Mai o te Whakapono	Ngāti Whātua (Ngāti Hinga)	Kaihu
Te Houhanga	Rāhiri	Te Roroa, Ngāti Whātua (Te Kuihi, Te Roroa)	Dargaville
Kāpehu	Tāringaroa	Ngāti Whātua	Arapohue
Te Kiore Marae	Te Kiore	Ngāpuhi (Ngāti Whakaminenga)	Kaikohe
Te Kōwhai Marae	Te Kōwhai	Ngāti Whātua, Te Uri o Hau	Matakohe
Matatina Marae	Tuohu	Te Roroa	Waipoua
Naumai	Ngā Uri o te Kotahitanga	Ngāti Whātua, Te Uri o Hau	Ruawai
Ngā Tai Whakarongorua Marae	Ngā Tai Whakarongorua	Ngāti Whātua, Te Uri o Hau	Tinopai
Ōtamatea	Aotearoa	Ngāti Whātua, Te Uri o Hau	Paparoa
Ōtūrei	Rangimārie Te Aroha	Te Uri o Hau, Ngāti Whātua (Te Popoto)	Te Kōpuru
Rāwhitiroa Marae	Rāwhitiroa	Ngāti Whātua (Te Popoto, Te Uri o Hau), Te Uri o Hau	Tinopai
Pananawe	Te Taumata o Tiopira Kinaki	Te Roroa, Ngāti Whātua (Te Roroa)	Waipoua
Parirau	Te Whare Mārama	Ngāti Whātua, Te Uri o Hau	Matakohe
Te Pounga Marae	Te Pounga	Te Uri o Hau, Ngāti Whātua (Te Uri o Hau)	Kaiwaka
Rīpia	No wharenui	Ngāti Whātua, Te Uri o Hau	Te Kōpuru
Taita Marae	Kia Mahara Koutou	Ngāti Whātua (Ngāti Torehina)	Kaihu
Tama te Uaua Marae	Tama te Uaua	Ngāti Whātua	Kaihu
Tangiterōria Marae	Tirarau	Ngāpuhi (Te Parawhau, Te Uriroroi), Ngāti Whātua (Te Kuihi, Te Parawhau)	Tangiteroria
Waihaua / Arapaoa	Kirihipi	Ngāti Whātua, Te Uri o Hau	Tinopai
Waikaraka Marae	Whakarongo	Te Roroa, Ngāti Whātua	Kaihu
Waiōhou	No wharenui	Ngāti Whātua, Te Uri o Hau	Tinopai
Waikarā	Te Uaua	Ngāti Whātua (Te Roroa)	Aranga
Waikāretu / Pōuto	Waikāretu	Ngāti Whātua, Te Uri o Hau	Te Kōpuru
Waiotea / Tinopai	No wharenui	Ngāti Whātua, Te Uri o Hau	Tinopai
Whananāki Marae	Whakapaumahara	Ngāti Rehua, Ngātiwai (Te Āki Tai)	Whananaki

== Whangarei District ==
Marae name	Wharenui name	Iwi and Hapū	Location
Korokota	Tikitiki o Rangi	Ngāpuhi (Te Parawhau), Ngāti Whātua (Te Parawhau)	Titoki
Te Kotahitanga Marae o Otangarei	Te Puawaitanga Hou	Ngāpuhi (Uri o Te Tangata)	Otangarei
Matapōuri Marae	Te Tokomanawa o te Aroha	Ngāti Rehua, Ngātiwai (Ngāti Toki-ki-te-Moananui, Te Āki Tai, Te Whānau a Rangiwhaakahu)	Matapouri
Maungārongo Marae	Maungārongo	Ngāpuhi (Ngāti Hine, Ngāti Te Rino, Te Parawhau, Te Uriroroi)	Maungakaramea
Mōkau Marae	Huruiki	Ngātiwai (Te Uri o Hikihiki)	Ōakura
Ngāraratunua Marae	Te Paea Soldiers' Memorial Hall	Ngāpuhi (Ngāti Hau, Ngāti Hine, Te Parawhau, Ngāti Kahu o Torongare)	Ngararatunua
Ngātiwai Marae	Ngāti Wai Soldiers' Memorial	Ngātiwai (Te Uri o Hikihiki)	Whangaruru
Ōākura Marae	No wharenui	Ngātiwai (Te Uri o Hikihiki)	Ōakura
Omauri	No wharenui	Ngāpuhi (Ngā Uri o Puhatahi)	Pipiwai
Te Oruoru Marae	Te Oruoru	Ngāpuhi (Ngāti Horahia, Ngāti Moe, Ngāti Te Rino, Ngāti Toki, Te Kumutu)	Pakotai
Ōtetao Reti	Hoori Reti	Ngātiwai (Te Uri o Hikihiki)	Punaruku
Parahaki Marae	Parahaki	Ngāpuhi (Ngāti Horahia, Ngāti Te Rino, Ngāti Toki, Ngāti Whakahotu, Te Kumutu)	Nukutawhiti
Parakao Marae	Te Aroha - Parakao	Ngāpuhi (Ngāti Horahia, Ngāti Moe, Ngāti Te Rino, Ngāti Toki, Te Parawhau, Ngāti Hine)	Parakao
Pātaua Marae	No wharenui	Ngātiwai (Ngāti Kororā)	Pataua
Pehiaweri	Te Reo o te Iwi	Ngāpuhi (Ngāti Hao, Ngāti Hau, Te Parawhau, Te Uriroroi)	Glenbervie
Takahiwai Marae	Rangiora	Ngātiwai (Te Patuharakeke), Ngāti Whātua (Patuharakeke)	Takahiwai
Te Tārai o Rāhiri	Nukutawhiti	Ngāpuhi (Ngāti Horahia, Ngāti Moe, Ngāti Te Rino, Ngāti Toki)	Pakotai
Tau Henare Marae	Tau Henare	Ngāpuhi (Te Orewai, Ngāti Hine)	Pipiwai
Terenga Parāoa	Kaka Porowini	Ngāpuhi (Uri o Te Tangata)	Morningside
Toetoe Marae	Toetoe	Ngāpuhi (Te Parawhau, Te Uriroroi), Ngāti Whātua (Te Uriroroi)	Otaika
Tuparehuia	No wharenui	Ngātiwai (Te Uri o Hikihiki)	Whangaruru
Whakapara Marae	Te Ihi o Nehua	Ngāpuhi (Ngāti Hao, Ngāti Hau)	Whakapara
Whakapaumahara	Whananāki	Ngātiwai (Te Whānau Whero)	Whananaki

== See also ==
- Lists of marae in New Zealand
- List of schools in the Northland Region
