= Ngāti Kahu ki Whangaroa =

Māori iwi (tribe) in Aotearoa (New Zealand)

- Iwi (tribe) in Māoridom
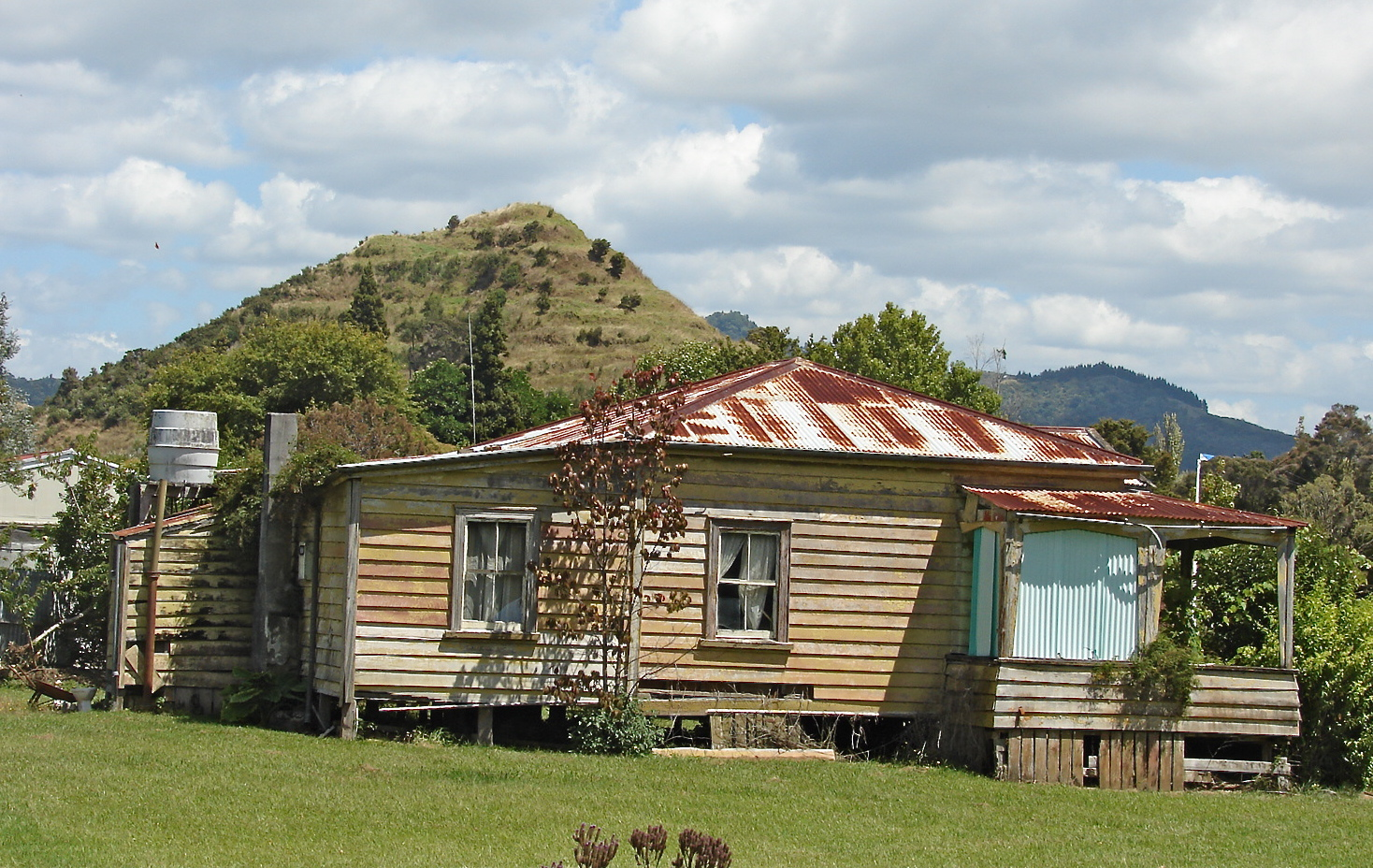
- Pohue-nui Pā
- Rohe (region): Northland, New Zealand
- Website: www.kahukuraariki.co.nz

Ngāti Kahu ki Whangaroa are a Māori iwi (tribe) based at the Whangaroa Harbour harbour area in New Zealand's Northland Region.

The iwi's rohe (tribal area) covers a coastal area from Kaeo and the Whangaroa Harbour in the east, to Oruaiti River, Mangonui and the eastern end of Doubtless Bay in the west. It extends just south of State Highway 10. The rohe of Ngāti Kahu and Ngāpuhi neighbours the rohe of Ngāti Kahu ki Whangaroa.

Another similarly named iwi — Ngāpuhi / Ngāti Kahu ki Whaingaroa — is also located in Northland.

== Hapū and marae ==
The iwi consists of the hapū (sub-tribes), who hold gatherings at marae (meeting places) and wharenui (meeting houses):

- Hāhi Katorika are affiliated with the Waitāruke Marae and Kahukura Ariki meeting house at Waitāruke.
- Hāpeta, Ngāti Kaitangata and Ngāti Rua, based at Taupō Marae and Te Tiriti meeting house at Taupō Bay.
- Waimahana, Riwhi and Te Pania are affiliated with Waimahana marae and Te Puhi o Te Waka at Waimahana Bay. Ngāti Aukiwa is also affiliated with Mangatōwai marae at Akatarere.
- Ngāti Roha is affiliated with Taemāro marae at Taemaro.
- Ngāti Rangimatamomoe and Te Hōia is affiliated with Ōtangaroa (Mangawhero) and Te Aroha meeting house at Ōtangaroa.
- Te Pohotiare is not currently affiliated with a marae.

== Governance ==
Kahukuraariki Trust is the iwi's post-Treaty settlement governance entity and is the iwi authority under planning law. Its board consists of one trustee elected by each of eight marae, plus one kaumātua elected by Te Rōpū Kaumatua.

The iwi's rohe covers territory of Far North District Council and Northland Regional Council.

== See also ==
- Ngāti Kahu
- List of Māori iwi
