= Parakao =

Coordinates: 35.713756°S 173.954891°E

Parakao is a village and rural community in the Whangarei District and Northland Region of New Zealand's North Island. It is located on State Highway 15, southeast of Pakotai and northwest of Titoki.

The local Parakao Marae and Te Aroha-Parakao meeting house is a tribal meeting place for the Ngāpuhi hapū of Ngāti Horahia, Ngāti Moe, Ngāti Te Rino, Ngāti Toki, Te Parawhau and Ngāti Hine.
