= Nukutawhiti =

Coordinates: 35.644387°S 173.860810°E

Nukutawhiti is a village and rural community in the Whangarei District and Northland Region of New Zealand's North Island. It is located on State Highway 15, south of Tautoro and north of Pakotai.

The local Parahaki Marae and Parahaki meeting house is a meeting place for the Ngāpuhi hapū of Ngāti Horahia, Ngāti Te Rino, Ngāti Toki, Ngāti Whakahotu and Te Kumutu.
