= Parapara =

Parapara may refer to:

- Parapara, Guárico, a Venezuelan town
- Parapara, Manawatū–Whanganui, a locality in the Manawatū-Whanganui Region of New Zealand
- Parapara, Northland, a locality in the Northland Region of New Zealand
- Parapara, Tasman, a locality in the Tasman Region of New Zealand
- Ceodes brunoniana, a tree known in New Zealand as parapara
- Para Para, a Japanese synchronized dance style
- Para, para'-Diaminodiphenyl-methane, a chemical compound
- PallaPalla, a member of the Amazoness Quartet from Sailor Moon, who was known as ParaPara in the original English dub
