= Titoki =

Titoki may refer to:

- Alectryon excelsus, a native tree of New Zealand found in lowland forests
- Titoki, New Zealand, a town in the Northland region of New Zealand
