= Waimahana Bay =

Coordinates: 34.952356°S 173.616335°E

Waimahana Bay is a beautiful and remote rural community in the Far North District and Northland Region of New Zealand's North Island.

The community is centred around the Waimahana Marae and Te Puhi o Te Waka meeting house, a tribal meeting ground of the Ngāti Kahu ki Whangaroa hapū of Ngāti Aukiwa and the Ngāpuhi / Ngāti Kahu ki Whaingaroa hapū of Ngāti Aukiwa. Waimahana Bay lies in between two other bays that are equally beautiful, Omatā and Okokori Bay.
