= Whaingaroa =

Whaingaroa may refer to:

- Ngāpuhi / Ngāti Kahu ki Whaingaroa, a Māori tribe
- Raglan, New Zealand, a town in Waikato

== See also ==
- Whangaroa, an area in Northland, New Zealand
- Whangaroa Harbour, a harbour in Northland, New Zealand
