= Otatara (disambiguation) =

- Otatara is a suburb of Invercargill

Otatara may also refer to:

- Otatara, a marine gastropod genera
- Ōtātara marae in the Waima Valley
- Ōtātara Pa a historic pa in Taradale, New Zealand
