= Mangakāhia River =

River in New Zealand

Coordinates: 35°52′S 174°02′E

Mangakahia River

Location
- Country: New Zealand

Physical characteristics
- Source
  - location: Mataraua Forest
- Mouth
  - location: Wairoa River
- Length: 48 km (30 mi)

The Mangakahia River is a river of the Northland Region of New Zealand's North Island. It flows east from its sources in the Mataraua Forest, turning southeastward after about 20 kilometres (12 mi) on joining with the small Awarua River. It is joined by the Opouteke River near Pakotai, then turns east, until it is joined by the Hikurangi River. It then turns south again, passing Titoki and then joining with the Wairua River to form the Wairoa River approximately halfway between Whangārei and Dargaville.

The New Zealand Ministry for Culture and Heritage gives a translation of "stream of the New Zealand passionfruit vine" for Mangakāhia.

== See also ==
- List of rivers of New Zealand
