= Karetu =

Karetu Kāretu
- Interactive map of Karetu
- Coordinates: 35°22′14″S 174°9′5″E
- Country: New Zealand
- Island: North Island
- Region: Northland Region
- District: Far North District
- Ward: Bay of Islands-Whangaroa Ward
- Community: Bay of Islands-Whangaroa
- Subdivision: Russell-Ōpua
- Electorates: Northland; Te Tai Tokerau

Government
  - Territorial Authority: Far North District Council
  - Regional council: Northland Regional Council
  - Mayor of Far North: Moko Tepania
  - Northland MP: Grant McCallum
  - Te Tai Tokerau MP: TBD

Karetu (Māori: Kāretu) is a community in the Northland Region of the North Island of New Zealand. Kawakawa is to the west, and Waikare is northeast. The Karetu River flows from the Russell Forest in the southeast through Karetu, and joins the Kawakawa River shortly before it flows into the Bay of Islands.

The name is a Māori word for Hierochloe redolens, a sweet-scented grass used in sachets and to make girdles.

Kāretu Marae and Ngāti Manu meeting house are affiliated with the Ngāpuhi hapū of Ngāti Manu and Te Uri Karaka.

== Demographics ==
Karetu is in an SA1 statistical area which covers 29.15 km^{2} (11.25 sq mi). The SA1 area is part of the larger Russell Forest-Rawhiti statistical area.

Historical population
Year	Pop.	±% p.a.
2006	156	—
2013	144	−1.14%
2018	144	+0.00%
2023	138	−0.85%

The SA1 statistical area had a population of 138 in the 2023 New Zealand census, a decrease of 6 people (−4.2%) since the 2018 census, and a decrease of 6 people (−4.2%) since the 2013 census. There were 72 males and 69 females in 63 dwellings. The median age was 57.3 years (compared with 38.1 years nationally). There were 15 people (10.9%) aged under 15 years, 18 (13.0%) aged 15 to 29, 57 (41.3%) aged 30 to 64, and 48 (34.8%) aged 65 or older.

People could identify as more than one ethnicity. The results were 63.0% European (Pākehā); 50.0% Māori; 2.2% Pasifika; and 2.2% Middle Eastern, Latin American and African New Zealanders (MELAA). English was spoken by 100.0%, Māori language by 10.9%, and other languages by 4.3%. No language could be spoken by 2.2% (e.g. too young to talk). The percentage of people born overseas was 17.4, compared with 28.8% nationally.

Religious affiliations were 37.0% Christian, 2.2% Māori religious beliefs, and 2.2% Buddhist. People who answered that they had no religion were 52.2%, and 6.5% of people did not answer the census question.

Of those at least 15 years old, 12 (9.8%) people had a bachelor's or higher degree, 69 (56.1%) had a post-high school certificate or diploma, and 33 (26.8%) people exclusively held high school qualifications. The median income was $28,700, compared with $41,500 nationally. 6 people (4.9%) earned over $100,000 compared to 12.1% nationally. The employment status of those at least 15 was that 48 (39.0%) people were employed full-time and 15 (12.2%) were part-time.

== Education ==
Karetu School is a decile 3 coeducational primary school serving years 1–8. It has a roll of 80 students as of July 2026.. The school was established in 1886.
