= Awarua, Northland =

Awarua
- Interactive map of Awarua
- Coordinates: 35.577°S 173.836°E
- Country: New Zealand
- Region: Northland Region
- District: Far North District
- Ward: Kaikohe/Hokianga
- Community: Kaikohe-Hokianga
- Subdivision: South Hokianga
- Electorates: Northland; Te Tai Tokerau (Māori)

Government
  - Territorial Authority: Far North District Council
  - Regional council: Northland Regional Council
  - Mayor of the Far North: Moko Tepania
  - Northland MP: Grant McCallum
  - Te Tai Tokerau MP: Mariameno Kapa-Kingi

Area
  - Total: 126.03 km^{2} (48.66 sq mi)

Population (2023 Census)
  - Total: 165
  - Density: 1.31/km^{2} (3.39/sq mi)

Awarua is a small rural community about 21 km (13 mi) south of Kaikohe in Northland, New Zealand. Awarua is situated around State Highway 15 and the Awarua River flows through the Awarua township.

== History and culture ==
Awarua has the Te Huruhi Marae.

== Demographics ==
Awarua covers 126.03 km^{2} (48.66 sq mi). It is part of the larger Mataraua Forest statistical area.

Historical population
| Year | Pop. | ±% p.a. |
|---|---|---|
| 2006 | 192 | — |
| 2013 | 153 | −3.19% |
| 2018 | 162 | +1.15% |
| 2023 | 165 | +0.37% |

Awarua had a population of 165 in the 2023 New Zealand census, an increase of 3 people (1.9%) since the 2018 census, and an increase of 12 people (7.8%) since the 2013 census. There were 84 males and 84 females in 60 dwellings. 3.6% of people identified as LGBTIQ+. The median age was 41.5 years (compared with 38.1 years nationally). There were 30 people (18.2%) aged under 15 years, 33 (20.0%) aged 15 to 29, 72 (43.6%) aged 30 to 64, and 30 (18.2%) aged 65 or older.

People could identify as more than one ethnicity. The results were 41.8% European (Pākehā), 81.8% Māori, and 9.1% Pasifika. English was spoken by 98.2%, Māori by 27.3%, Samoan by 1.8%, and other languages by 1.8%. No language could be spoken by 1.8% (e.g. too young to talk). The percentage of people born overseas was 3.6, compared with 28.8% nationally.

Religious affiliations were 41.8% Christian, 1.8% Māori religious beliefs, and 1.8% other religions. People who answered that they had no religion were 45.5%, and 7.3% of people did not answer the census question.

Of those at least 15 years old, 12 (8.9%) people had a bachelor's or higher degree, 84 (62.2%) had a post-high school certificate or diploma, and 54 (40.0%) people exclusively held high school qualifications. The median income was $27,600, compared with $41,500 nationally. 3 people (2.2%) earned over $100,000 compared to 12.1% nationally. The employment status of those at least 15 was 45 (33.3%) full-time, 12 (8.9%) part-time, and 12 (8.9%) unemployed.
