= Opouteke River =

Coordinates: 35°39′S 173°53′E

Location
- Country: New Zealand

Physical characteristics
- Mouth
  - location: Mangakahia River
- Length: 18 km (11 mi)

The Opouteke River (in its upper reaches called Opouteke Stream) is a river of the Northland Region of New Zealand's North Island. It flows generally east, reaching the Mangakahia River just north of Pakotai and 30 kilometres north of Dargaville.

== See also ==
- List of rivers of New Zealand
