= Kaihu =

- Location within Northland Region
- Coordinates: 35°46′5″S 173°42′2″E
- Country: New Zealand
- Region: Northland Region
- District: Kaipara District

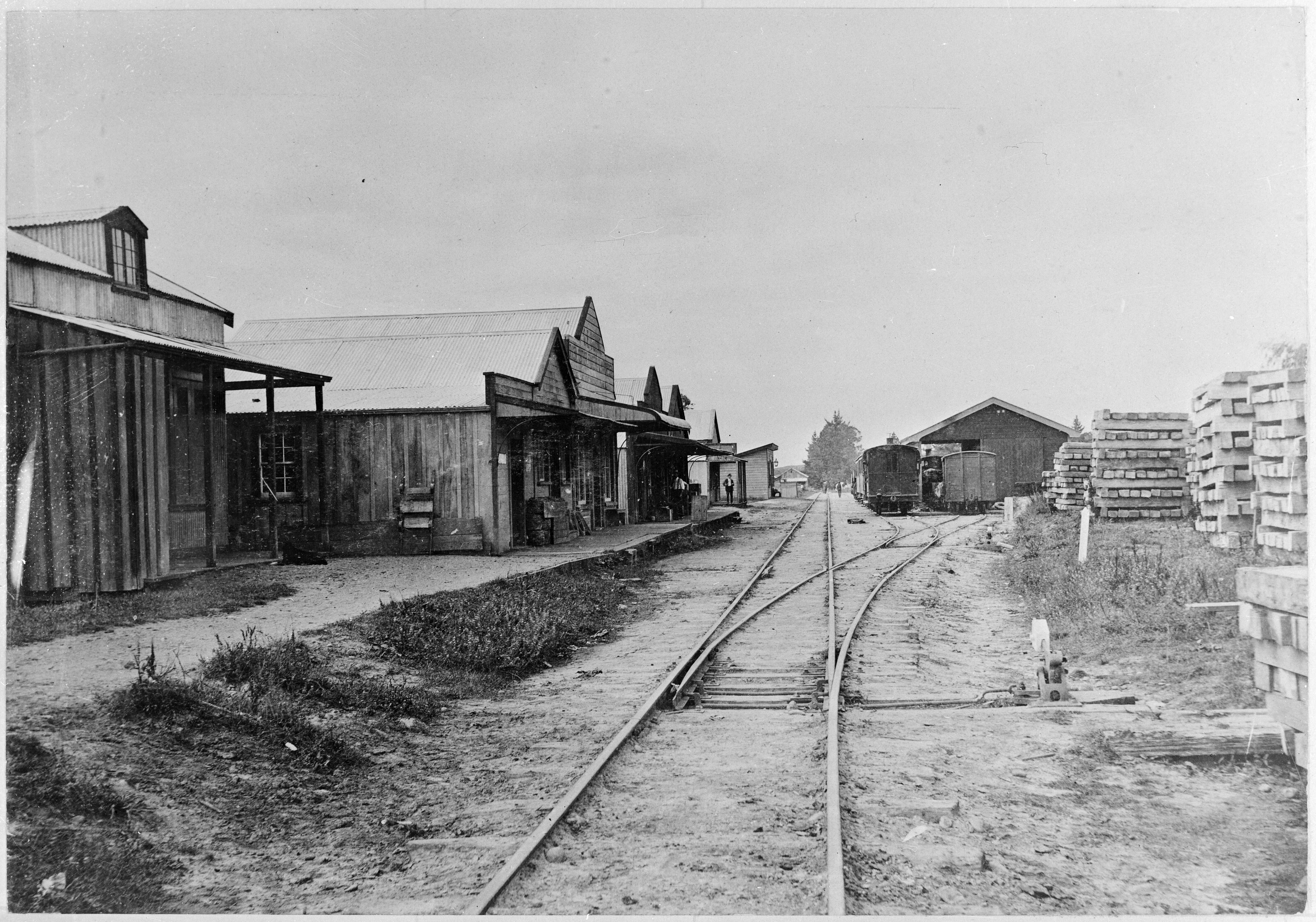
Railway station at Kaihu in 1912

Kaihu (Māori: Kaihū) is a locality and settlement in Northland, New Zealand. The Kaihu River runs through the Kaihu Valley into the Wairoa River near Dargaville, approximately 32 km south east. State Highway 12 runs along the valley and passes through Kaihu settlement. Aranga is about 10 km north west. The Kaihu Forest is to the east and the Marlborough Forest is to the north.

The New Zealand Ministry for Culture and Heritage gives a translation of "eating secretly" for Kaihu.

The local hapu are Te Roroa of the Ngāti Whātua iwi.

== History and culture ==
Ngāti Awa originally occupied the area, but were evicted and replaced by Ngāti Whātua around 1640 CE. In 1806 during the Musket Wars, battles were fought between Ngāti Whātua and Ngā Puhi over a pa near Kaihu, and a further raid occurred in 1825.

Joel Samuel Polack may have been the first European to visit Kaihu, in 1832. John Whiteley described Kaihu as "the principal village of Kaipara" in 1834 and recommended it as a suitable place for a mission to be built.

Several Europeans tried to purchase land at Kaihu before a deadline on land purchases set for 14 January 1840 by Sir George Gipps. An attempt to purchase 18,000 acres (7300 ha) by James Salter and others in March 1839 was disallowed. Thomas Spencer purchased 400 acres (160 ha) of land in Kaihu in September 1839.

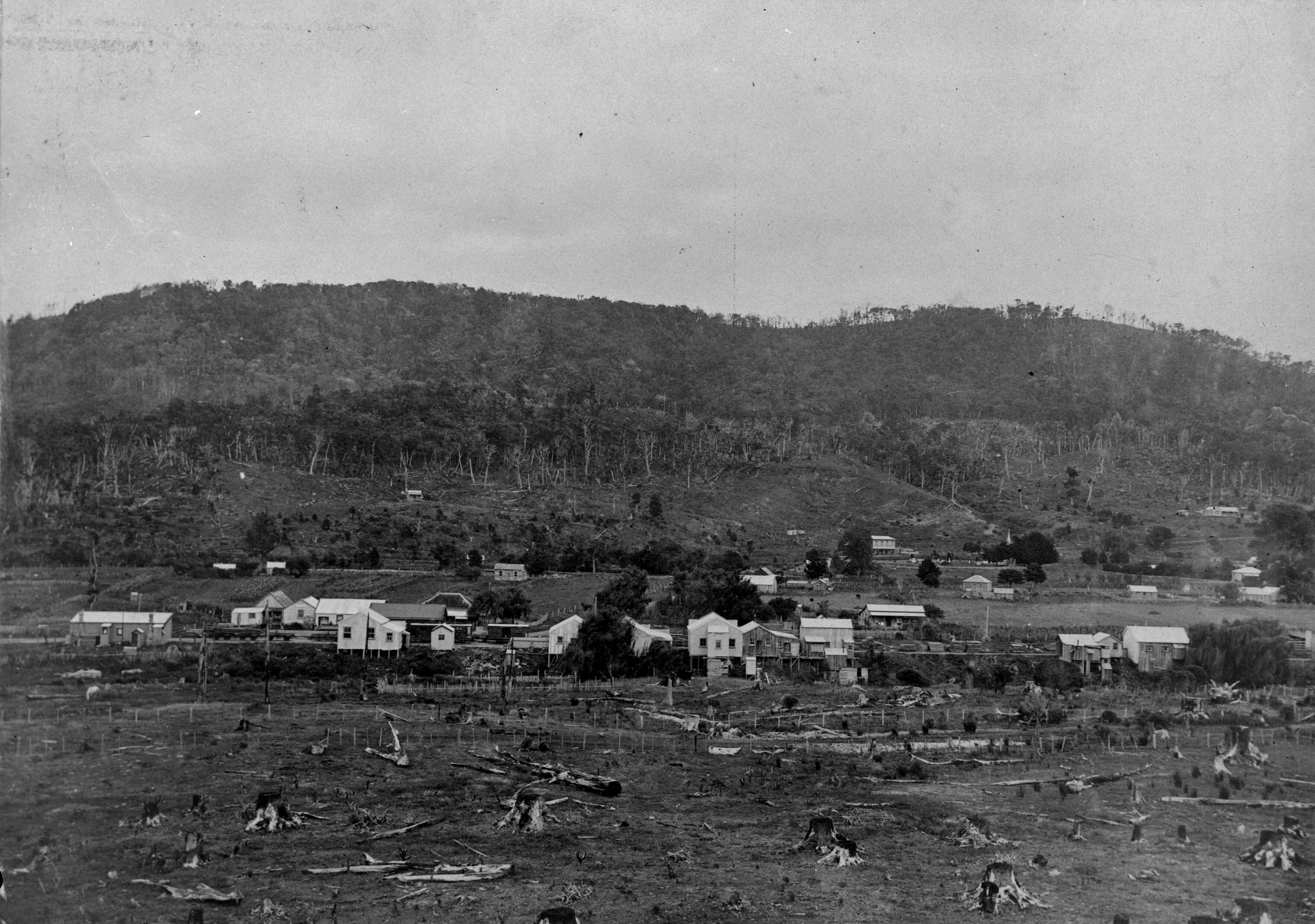
Settlement of Kaihu, ca. 1912

A railway line to service the kauri industry was built from Dargaville along the valley to Kaihu in about 1883, and extended to Donnellys Crossing in 1921 (becoming known as the Donnellys Crossing Section). As the roads improved, the line became uneconomic, and it was closed on 18 July 1959.

A town grew up, initially called Opanake, but by the end of the century called Kaihu. In the 1890s, with both the timber and gum-digging trades expanding, and a road built from Dargaville, the population of the town increased from 200 to 500. A sawmill was established in Kaihu about 1898 for kauri and tōtara, with a capacity of 3 million feet per annum, although this capacity may never have been fully utilised. Two large floods occurred around the turn of the century, one of which destroyed a large part of the mill. The mill closed in 1915, which caused the population of the town to halve.

Several Ngāti Whātua marae are located in the Kaihu area. Waikaraka Marae and Whakarongo meeting house are affiliated with Te Roroa. Ahikiwi Marae and Te Aranga Mai o te Whakapono meeting house are affiliated with the hapū of Ngāti Hinga. Taita Marae and Kia Mahara Koutou meeting house are affiliated with the hapū of Ngāti Torehina. Tama te Uaua Marae and Tama te Uaua meeting house are also a meeting place for local Ngāti Whātua.

== Notable people ==
- William Sage Rapson, chemist

== Education ==
Kaihu Valley School is a coeducational full primary (years 1–8) school with a roll of 13 as of July 2026. A native school first opened at Kaihu in 1887, but was replaced by a government school in 1897. The current school celebrated its centenary in 2004.

Maropiu District High School, to the south of Kaihu, closed in 1973.
