= Takahue =

Rural community in New Zealand

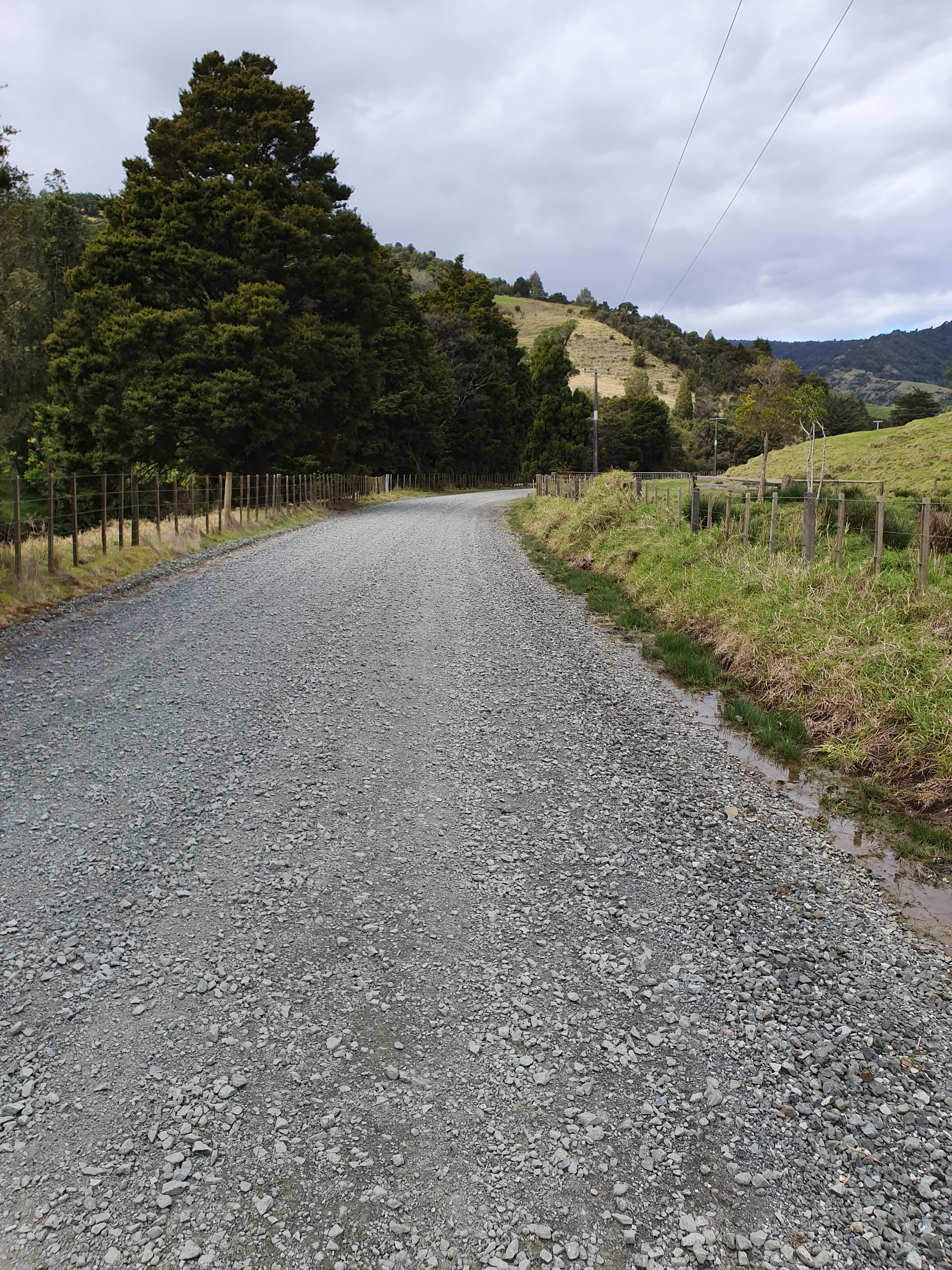
- Takahue Saddle Road is part of Te Araroa trail
- Interactive map of Takahue
- Coordinates: 35°12′01″S 173°20′36″E
- Country: New Zealand
- Region: Northland Region
- District: Far North District
- Ward: Te Hiku
- Community: Te Hiku
- Subdivision: Kaitāia
- Electorates: Northland; Te Tai Tokerau

Government
  - Territorial Authority: Far North District Council
  - Regional council: Northland Regional Council
  - Mayor of Far North: Moko Tepania
  - Northland MP: Grant McCallum
  - Te Tai Tokerau MP: Mariameno Kapa-Kingi

Takahue is a rural community in the Far North District and Northland Region of New Zealand's North Island, south of Kaitaia.

The local Takahue Marae is a meeting place of the Ngāti Kahu hapū of Te Tahawai. It includes the Ōkakewai meeting house.

Takahue is part of a statistical area called Herekino-Takahue, which extends to the western coast.

== Demographics ==
The SA1 statistical area which includes Takahue covers 51.32 km^{2} (19.81 sq mi). The SA1 area is part of the larger Herekino-Takahue statistical area.

Historical population
Year	Pop.	±% p.a.
2006	189	—
2013	198	+0.67%
2018	216	+1.76%
2023	264	+4.10%

The SA1 statistical area had a population of 264 in the 2023 New Zealand census, an increase of 48 people (22.2%) since the 2018 census, and an increase of 66 people (33.3%) since the 2013 census. There were 132 males, 132 females and 3 people of other genders in 93 dwellings. 2.3% of people identified as LGBTIQ+. The median age was 40.2 years (compared with 38.1 years nationally). There were 54 people (20.5%) aged under 15 years, 48 (18.2%) aged 15 to 29, 123 (46.6%) aged 30 to 64, and 39 (14.8%) aged 65 or older.

People could identify as more than one ethnicity. The results were 80.7% European (Pākehā), 39.8% Māori, 3.4% Pasifika, and 1.1% Asian. English was spoken by 98.9%, Māori language by 10.2%, Samoan by 1.1% and other languages by 8.0%. No language could be spoken by 1.1% (e.g. too young to talk). The percentage of people born overseas was 13.6, compared with 28.8% nationally.

Religious affiliations were 34.1% Christian, 1.1% Hindu, 2.3% Māori religious beliefs, 2.3% Buddhist, 1.1% New Age, and 2.3% other religions. People who answered that they had no religion were 47.7%, and 12.5% of people did not answer the census question.

Of those at least 15 years old, 30 (14.3%) people had a bachelor's or higher degree, 111 (52.9%) had a post-high school certificate or diploma, and 63 (30.0%) people exclusively held high school qualifications. The median income was $28,500, compared with $41,500 nationally. 3 people (1.4%) earned over $100,000 compared to 12.1% nationally. The employment status of those at least 15 was that 84 (40.0%) people were employed full-time, 33 (15.7%) were part-time, and 12 (5.7%) were unemployed.

== Education ==
Takahue School operated from 1888 to 1973, when it was closed due to falling student numbers.
