= Pipiwai =

Locality in Northland, New Zealand

- Interactive map of Pipiwai
- Coordinates: 35°37′14″S 174°01′07″E
- Country: New Zealand
- Region: Northland Region
- District: Whangarei District
- Ward: Mangakahia-Maungatapere General Ward
- Electorates: Northland; Te Tai Tokerau (Māori)

Government
  - Territorial authority: Whangarei District Council
  - Regional council: Northland Regional Council
  - Mayor of Whangārei: Ken Couper
  - Northland MP: Grant McCallum
  - Te Tai Tokerau MP: Mariameno Kapa-Kingi

Area
  - Total: 40.08 km^{2} (15.47 sq mi)

Population (2023 Census)
  - Total: 144
  - Density: 3.59/km^{2} (9.31/sq mi)

Pipiwai (Māori: Pīpīwai) is a locality in the Te Horo valley in Northland, New Zealand. Whangārei is about 35 km to the southeast. Titoki is about 16 km to the south.

There are few jobs in the area, and most adults commute to Whangārei or Dargaville.

== Demographics ==
Pipiwai and its surrounds cover 40.08 km^{2} (15.47 sq mi). It is part of the larger Mangakahia-Hūkerenui statistical area.

Historical population
| Year | Pop. | ±% p.a. |
|---|---|---|
| 2013 | 93 | — |
| 2018 | 156 | +10.90% |
| 2023 | 144 | −1.59% |

Pipiwai and surrounds had a population of 144 in the 2023 New Zealand census, a decrease of 12 people (−7.7%) since the 2018 census, and an increase of 51 people (54.8%) since the 2013 census. There were 75 males and 72 females in 45 dwellings. 2.1% of people identified as LGBTIQ+. The median age was 34.5 years (compared with 38.1 years nationally). There were 30 people (20.8%) aged under 15 years, 30 (20.8%) aged 15 to 29, 63 (43.8%) aged 30 to 64, and 24 (16.7%) aged 65 or older.

People could identify as more than one ethnicity. The results were 37.5% European (Pākehā), 85.4% Māori, and 2.1% Pasifika. English was spoken by 97.9%, Māori by 29.2%, Samoan by 2.1%, and other languages by 4.2%. No language could be spoken by 2.1% (e.g. too young to talk). New Zealand Sign Language was known by 2.1%. The percentage of people born overseas was 8.3, compared with 28.8% nationally.

Religious affiliations were 37.5% Christian, and 10.4% Māori religious beliefs. People who answered that they had no religion were 47.9%, and 4.2% of people did not answer the census question.

Of those at least 15 years old, 12 (10.5%) people had a bachelor's or higher degree, 60 (52.6%) had a post-high school certificate or diploma, and 48 (42.1%) people exclusively held high school qualifications. The median income was $23,500, compared with $41,500 nationally. 6 people (5.3%) earned over $100,000 compared to 12.1% nationally. The employment status of those at least 15 was 36 (31.6%) full-time, 24 (21.1%) part-time, and 6 (5.3%) unemployed.

== Marae ==
The local Tau Henare Marae and meeting house are a traditional meeting ground for the Ngāpuhi hapū of Te Orewai and Ngāti Hine. The Omauri marae grounds, located near Pipiwai, are a meeting place for the Ngāpuhi hapū of Ngā Uri o Puhatahi.

== Education ==
Te Horo School is a coeducational full primary (years 1–8) school with a roll of 26 students as of July 2025. Te Horo Native School flourished at Pipiwai from 1918 to 1947.

Tau Henare Marae runs a kohanga reo.

== Notable people ==
- Taurekareka Henare, Reform Party politician
- Lani Daniels, Boxing World heavyweight champion

== Climate ==
Climate data for Puketurua (8km SE of Pipiwai, 1965–1975)
| Month | Jan | Feb | Mar | Apr | May | Jun | Jul | Aug | Sep | Oct | Nov | Dec | Year |
|---|---|---|---|---|---|---|---|---|---|---|---|---|---|
| Record high °C (°F) | 30.6 (87.1) | 32.5 (90.5) | 30.6 (87.1) | 29.2 (84.6) | 23.6 (74.5) | 21.1 (70.0) | 19.9 (67.8) | 21.7 (71.1) | 23.9 (75.0) | 24.1 (75.4) | 27.3 (81.1) | 29.5 (85.1) | 32.5 (90.5) |
| Mean maximum °C (°F) | 29.3 (84.7) | 29.7 (85.5) | 27.6 (81.7) | 24.7 (76.5) | 22.1 (71.8) | 19.7 (67.5) | 18.3 (64.9) | 19.3 (66.7) | 21.2 (70.2) | 22.9 (73.2) | 25.5 (77.9) | 27.3 (81.1) | 30.1 (86.2) |
| Mean daily maximum °C (°F) | 25.1 (77.2) | 25.2 (77.4) | 23.6 (74.5) | 20.8 (69.4) | 18.2 (64.8) | 15.8 (60.4) | 14.9 (58.8) | 15.9 (60.6) | 17.3 (63.1) | 19.0 (66.2) | 21.4 (70.5) | 23.1 (73.6) | 20.0 (68.0) |
| Daily mean °C (°F) | 19.1 (66.4) | 19.4 (66.9) | 18.4 (65.1) | 15.7 (60.3) | 13.4 (56.1) | 11.4 (52.5) | 10.2 (50.4) | 11.3 (52.3) | 12.6 (54.7) | 14.0 (57.2) | 15.9 (60.6) | 17.5 (63.5) | 14.9 (58.8) |
| Mean daily minimum °C (°F) | 13.1 (55.6) | 13.7 (56.7) | 13.1 (55.6) | 10.7 (51.3) | 8.6 (47.5) | 6.9 (44.4) | 5.5 (41.9) | 6.7 (44.1) | 7.8 (46.0) | 9.0 (48.2) | 10.5 (50.9) | 11.9 (53.4) | 9.8 (49.6) |
| Mean minimum °C (°F) | 7.4 (45.3) | 7.6 (45.7) | 6.4 (43.5) | 3.8 (38.8) | 1.5 (34.7) | −0.6 (30.9) | −1.5 (29.3) | −0.6 (30.9) | 1.5 (34.7) | 2.0 (35.6) | 3.6 (38.5) | 5.9 (42.6) | −2.1 (28.2) |
| Record low °C (°F) | 5.4 (41.7) | 5.3 (41.5) | 4.8 (40.6) | 1.9 (35.4) | −1.7 (28.9) | −2.7 (27.1) | −3.6 (25.5) | −2.9 (26.8) | −1.7 (28.9) | 0.0 (32.0) | 1.1 (34.0) | 3.2 (37.8) | −3.6 (25.5) |
| Average rainfall mm (inches) | 68.9 (2.71) | 107.0 (4.21) | 95.4 (3.76) | 113.2 (4.46) | 114.5 (4.51) | 165.3 (6.51) | 125.4 (4.94) | 155.5 (6.12) | 117.7 (4.63) | 97.0 (3.82) | 103.7 (4.08) | 104.5 (4.11) | 1,368.1 (53.86) |
Source: NIWA
