= Peria, Northland =

Peria
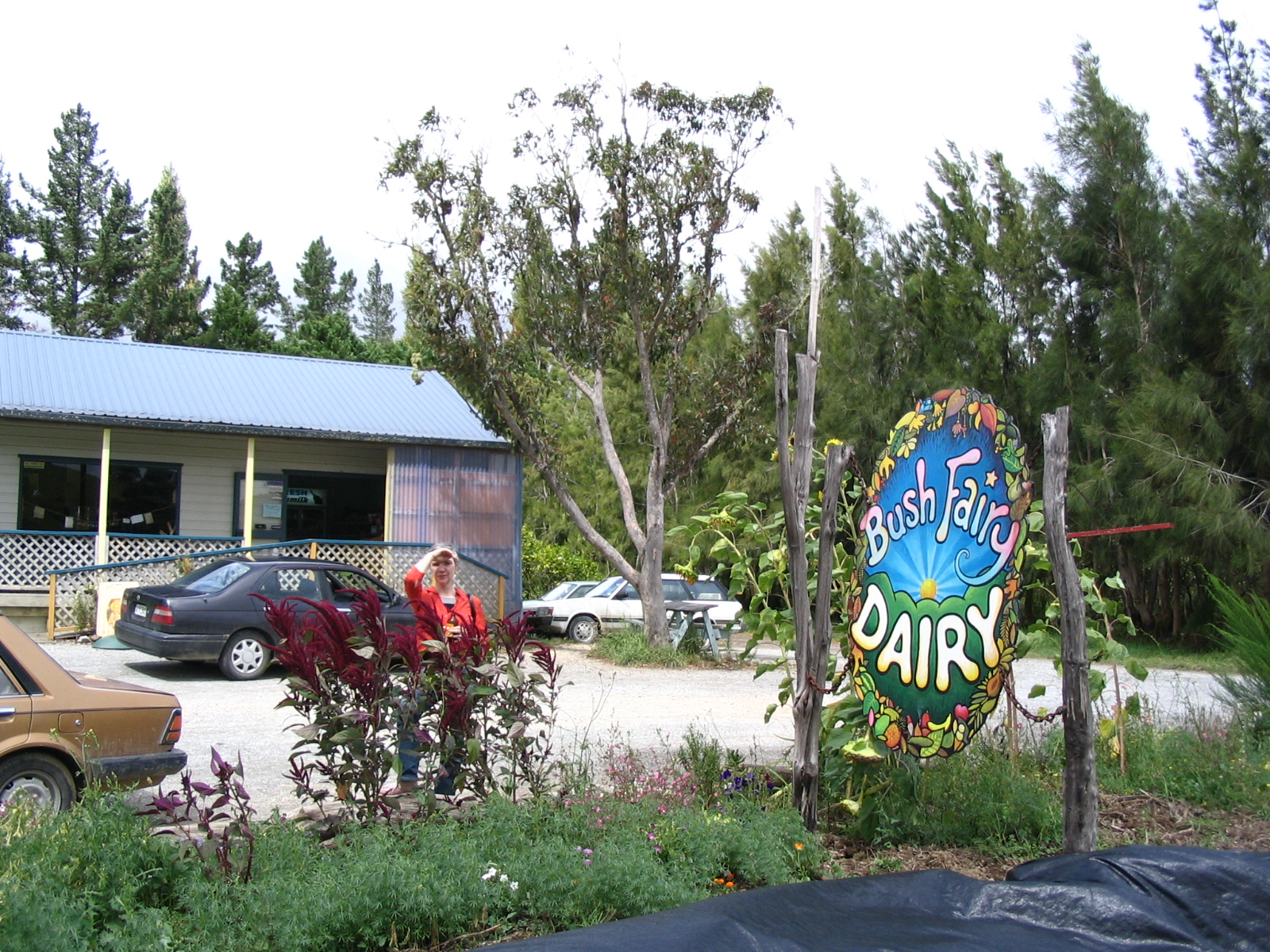
- The Bush Fairy Dairy at Peria
- Interactive map of Peria
- Coordinates: 35°5′54″S 173°29′17″E
- Country: New Zealand
- Region: Northland Region
- District: Far North District
- Ward: Te Hiku
- Community: Te Hiku
- Subdivision: Whatuwhiwhi; Kaitāia
- Electorates: Northland; Te Tai Tokerau

Government
  - Territorial Authority: Far North District Council
  - Regional council: Northland Regional Council
  - Mayor of Far North: Moko Tepania
  - Northland MP: Grant McCallum
  - Te Tai Tokerau MP: Mariameno Kapa-Kingi

Peria is a locality in Northland, New Zealand. It lies south of Taipa and east of Kaitaia. The area was once known as Oruru Valley.

Wiremu Hoani Taua, who later became the first Māori person to be appointed as the head teacher of a native school, served on the Peria Native School Committee until 1900.

== Demographics ==
The Peria statistical area covers 199.63 km^{2} (77.08 sq mi) and had an estimated population of 1,290 as of June 2025, with a population density of 6.5 people per km^{2}.

Historical population
Year	Pop.	±% p.a.
2006	1,011	—
2013	951	−0.87%
2018	1,107	+3.08%
2023	1,260	+2.62%

Peria had a population of 1,260 in the 2023 New Zealand census, an increase of 153 people (13.8%) since the 2018 census, and an increase of 309 people (32.5%) since the 2013 census. There were 645 males and 615 females in 507 dwellings. 2.1% of people identified as LGBTIQ+. The median age was 46.7 years (compared with 38.1 years nationally). There were 258 people (20.5%) aged under 15 years, 156 (12.4%) aged 15 to 29, 594 (47.1%) aged 30 to 64, and 249 (19.8%) aged 65 or older.

People could identify as more than one ethnicity. The results were 76.7% European (Pākehā); 40.7% Māori; 4.8% Pasifika; 1.4% Asian; 1.0% Middle Eastern, Latin American and African New Zealanders (MELAA); and 3.8% other, which includes people giving their ethnicity as "New Zealander". English was spoken by 98.1%, Māori language by 11.9%, Samoan by 0.5% and other languages by 6.9%. No language could be spoken by 1.7% (e.g. too young to talk). New Zealand Sign Language was known by 0.5%. The percentage of people born overseas was 15.2, compared with 28.8% nationally.

Religious affiliations were 28.6% Christian, 0.2% Hindu, 2.9% Māori religious beliefs, 1.0% Buddhist, 1.4% New Age, 0.2% Jewish, and 1.0% other religions. People who answered that they had no religion were 57.9%, and 7.1% of people did not answer the census question.

Of those at least 15 years old, 111 (11.1%) people had a bachelor's or higher degree, 579 (57.8%) had a post-high school certificate or diploma, and 279 (27.8%) people exclusively held high school qualifications. The median income was $25,900, compared with $41,500 nationally. 24 people (2.4%) earned over $100,000 compared to 12.1% nationally. The employment status of those at least 15 was that 369 (36.8%) people were employed full-time, 150 (15.0%) were part-time, and 45 (4.5%) were unemployed.

== Education ==
Peria School is a coeducational full primary (years 1–8) school with a roll of 68 students as of July 2026. The school was established in 1873, It was a native school until 1914.

The local marae, Te Kauhanga, and its meeting house, Te Poho o Ngāti Kahu, are a tribal meeting place for the Ngāti Kahu hapū of Te Paatu ki Pēria.
