= Whananaki =

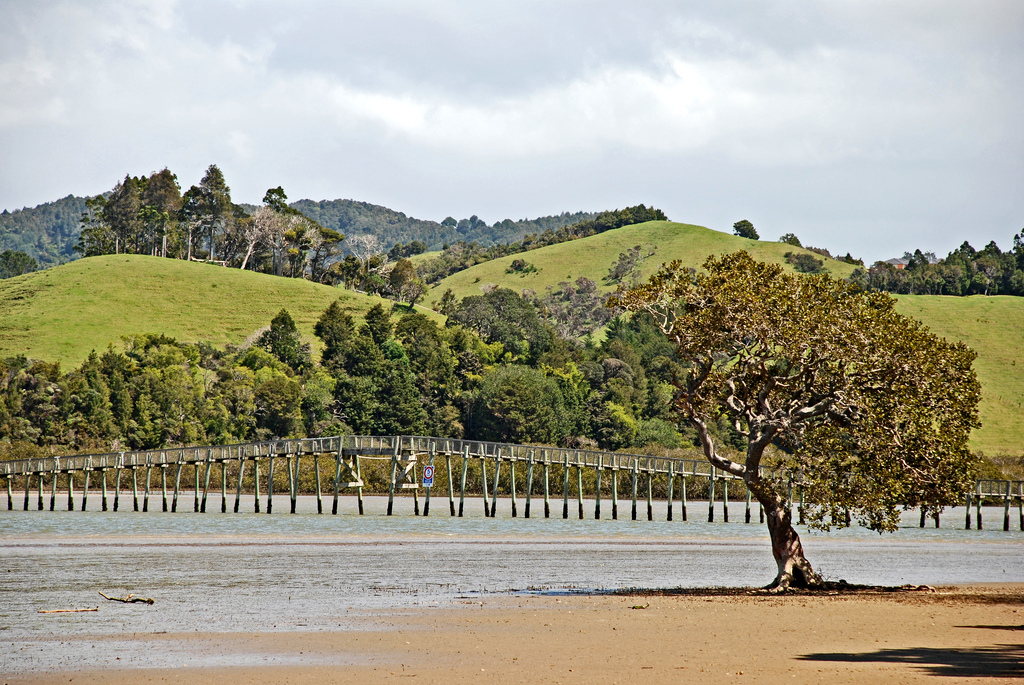
- Whananaki Footbridge

- Location within Northland Region
- Coordinates: 35°30′49″S 174°27′23″E
- Country: New Zealand
- Region: Northland Region
- District: Whangarei District

Whananaki (Māori: Whananāki) is a locality on the east coast of Northland, New Zealand. Whangārei is to the southwest. Te Wairahi Stream flows from the northwest into Whananaki Inlet, a wide tidal estuary which separates Whananaki from Whananaki South. Sandy Bay lies to the southeast. A long wooden footbridge connects Whananaki North and Whananaki South, with an alternative connection being a 6-kilometre-long (3.7 mi) road that crosses the river above the estuary. Hikurangi is about 22 km southwest of Whananaki South.

The area was reputedly named by Puhi, the captain of the legendary waka Mātaatua. The Māori-language word Whananāki means "kicking", and the name arose because mosquitoes caused Puhi to sleep restlessly.

== Marae ==
Whananāki Marae and Whakapaumahara meeting house are a meeting place for Ngāti Rehua and the Ngātiwai hapū of Te Āki Tai.

Work began on redeveloping the marae in December 2018.

In October 2020, the Government committed $341,028 from the Provincial Growth Fund towards continuing the upgrade, creating 14 jobs.

== Education ==
Whananaki School is a coeducational full primary (years 1–8) school with a roll of 51 as of July 2026. The school opened in 1889.

== Notable people ==
- Winston Peters, leader of New Zealand First
- Jim Peters, politician
