= Ōakura, Northland =

Ōakura
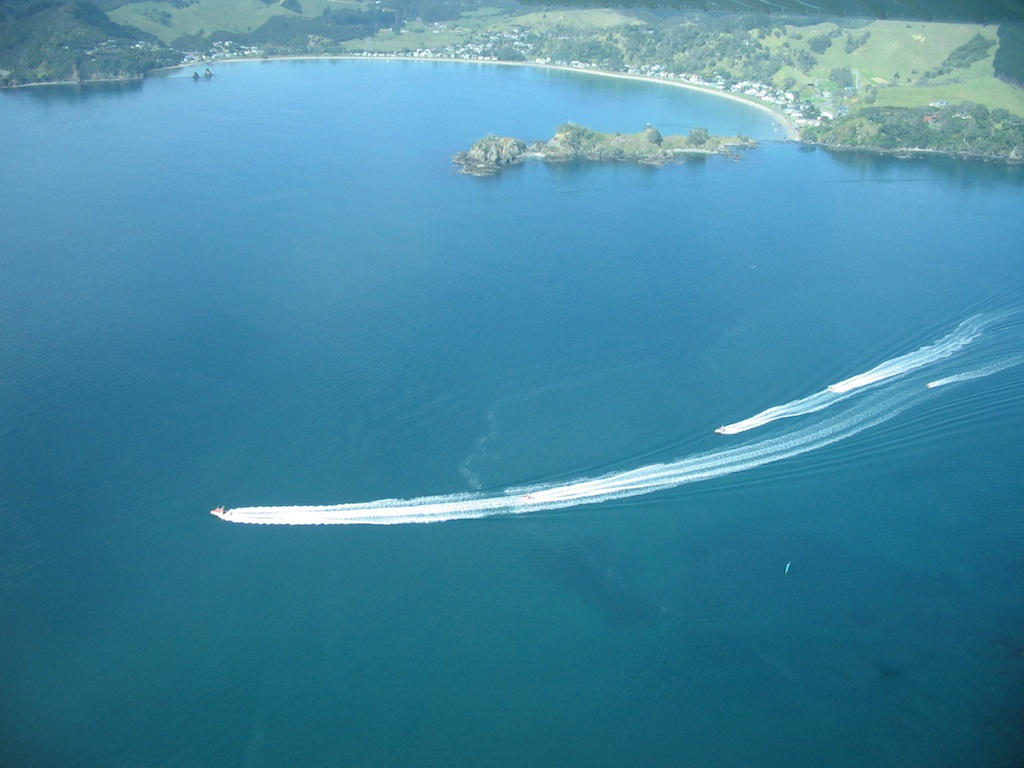
- Ōakura Bay and Ōkiore Point / Rugged Point
- Interactive map of Ōakura
- Country: New Zealand
- Region: Northland Region
- District: Whangarei District
- Ward: Hikurangi-Coastal Ward

Government
  - Territorial Authority: Whangarei District Council
  - Regional council: Northland Regional Council

Ōakura is a small coastal settlement in the Whangarei District and Northland Region of New Zealand's North Island.

The local Mōkau Marae and Huruiki meeting house is a meeting place of the Ngātiwai hapū of Te Uri o Hikihiki. The hapū also has another marae, Ōākura Marae, under construction.

== Demographics ==
Ōakura is part of the Ōakura-Whangaruru South settlement.
