= Rawhiti =

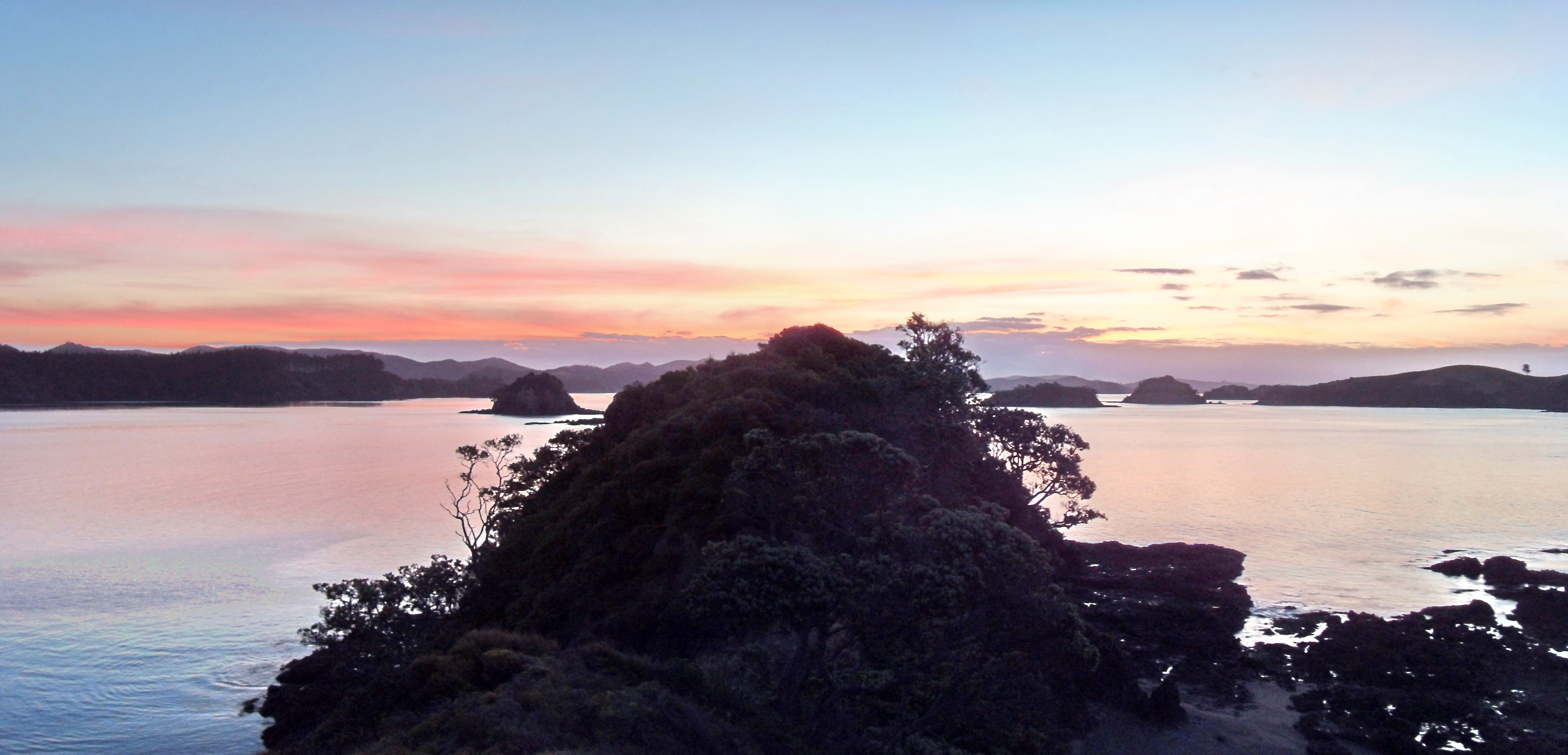
- View of Rawhiti, looking south from Orerewai Point
- Interactive map of Rawhiti
- Coordinates: 35.232°S 174.261°E
- Country: New Zealand
- Region: Northland Region
- District: Far North District
- Ward: Bay of Islands-Whangaroa Ward
- Community: Bay of Islands-Whangaroa
- Subdivision: Russell-Ōpua
- Electorates: Northland; Te Tai Tokerau

Government
  - Territorial Authority: Far North District Council
  - Regional council: Northland Regional Council
  - Mayor of Far North: Moko Tepania
  - Northland MP: Grant McCallum
  - Te Tai Tokerau MP: Mariameno Kapa-Kingi

Rawhiti (Māori: Rāwhiti) is a small beachfront town about 27km from Russell in the Bay of Islands of New Zealand.

== Marae ==
The area has two Ngāpuhi marae. Kaingahoa Rāwhiti Marae and its Tūmanako meeting house are affiliated with the hapū of Patukeha. Te Rāwhiti or Omakiwi Marae and Te Rāwhiti meeting house are affiliated with Ngāti Kuta and Patukeha.

== Demographics ==
Rawhiti is in an SA1 statistical area which includes Cape Brett Peninsula and the eastern islands in the Bay of Islands. It covers 23.47 km^{2} (9.06 sq mi). The SA1 area is part of the larger Russell Forest-Rawhiti statistical area.

Historical population for Cape Brett Peninsula and adjacent islands
Year	Pop.	±% p.a.
2006	150	—
2013	135	−1.49%
2018	138	+0.44%
2023	165	+3.64%

The SA1 area had a population of 165 in the 2023 New Zealand census, an increase of 27 people (19.6%) since the 2018 census, and an increase of 30 people (22.2%) since the 2013 census. There were 84 males and 78 females in 54 dwellings. 1.8% of people identified as LGBTIQ+. The median age was 41.6 years (compared with 38.1 years nationally). There were 33 people (20.0%) aged under 15 years, 36 (21.8%) aged 15 to 29, 63 (38.2%) aged 30 to 64, and 30 (18.2%) aged 65 or older.

People could identify as more than one ethnicity. The results were 34.5% European (Pākehā), 80.0% Māori, 14.5% Pasifika, and 3.6% other, which includes people giving their ethnicity as "New Zealander". English was spoken by 94.5%, Māori language by 32.7%, Samoan by 5.5%, and other languages by 1.8%. The percentage of people born overseas was 3.6, compared with 28.8% nationally.

Religious affiliations were 29.1% Christian, 16.4% Māori religious beliefs, and 1.8% other religions. People who answered that they had no religion were 45.5%, and 5.5% of people did not answer the census question.

Of those at least 15 years old, 12 (9.1%) people had a bachelor's or higher degree, 63 (47.7%) had a post-high school certificate or diploma, and 51 (38.6%) people exclusively held high school qualifications. The median income was $23,600, compared with $41,500 nationally. The employment status of those at least 15 was that 36 (27.3%) people were employed full-time, 12 (9.1%) were part-time, and 15 (11.4%) were unemployed.

=== Russell Forest-Rawhiti statistical area ===
Russell Forest-Rawhiti statistical area, which also includes Waikare and Karetu, covers 191.37 km^{2} (73.89 sq mi) and had an estimated population of 760 as of June 2025, with a population density of 4.0 people per km^{2}.

Historical population for Russell Forest-Rawhiti
Year	Pop.	±% p.a.
2006	648	—
2013	660	+0.26%
2018	690	+0.89%
2023	738	+1.35%

Russell Forest-Rawhiti had a population of 738 in the 2023 New Zealand census, an increase of 48 people (7.0%) since the 2018 census, and an increase of 78 people (11.8%) since the 2013 census. There were 375 males and 360 females in 282 dwellings. 1.2% of people identified as LGBTIQ+. The median age was 50.6 years (compared with 38.1 years nationally). There were 132 people (17.9%) aged under 15 years, 114 (15.4%) aged 15 to 29, 300 (40.7%) aged 30 to 64, and 195 (26.4%) aged 65 or older.

People could identify as more than one ethnicity. The results were 47.2% European (Pākehā); 66.3% Māori; 7.3% Pasifika; 0.4% Middle Eastern, Latin American and African New Zealanders (MELAA); and 1.2% other, which includes people giving their ethnicity as "New Zealander". English was spoken by 96.7%, Māori language by 26.4%, Samoan by 0.8%, and other languages by 1.6%. No language could be spoken by 1.6% (e.g. too young to talk). The percentage of people born overseas was 8.5, compared with 28.8% nationally.

Religious affiliations were 31.3% Christian, 9.3% Māori religious beliefs, 0.4% Buddhist, 0.4% New Age, and 0.8% other religions. People who answered that they had no religion were 50.0%, and 8.1% of people did not answer the census question.

Of those at least 15 years old, 54 (8.9%) people had a bachelor's or higher degree, 342 (56.4%) had a post-high school certificate or diploma, and 195 (32.2%) people exclusively held high school qualifications. The median income was $26,500, compared with $41,500 nationally. 21 people (3.5%) earned over $100,000 compared to 12.1% nationally. The employment status of those at least 15 was that 204 (33.7%) people were employed full-time, 69 (11.4%) were part-time, and 42 (6.9%) were unemployed.
