= Takahiwai =

Coordinates: 35.834916°S 174.418101°E

Takahiwai is a rural community west of Marsden Bay, in the Whangarei District and Northland Region of New Zealand's North Island.

The Takahiwai Hills, a series of ranges covered in vegetation, dominate the Takahiwai landscape. The ranges include the Takahiwai Forests, one of the largest areas of coastal kanuka forest in the world. Kauri-kanuka forest dominates many of the ridges.

The New Zealand Ministry for Culture and Heritage gives a translation of "trample water" for Takahiwai.

The area has a local history of Māori settlement by the Patuharakeke people. Pakauhokio, at the western edge of the ranges, was a significant pā site. There is also evidence of pā sites further west along the ridge, and near the harbour coast.

The local Takahiwai Marae is a meeting place of the Ngātiwai hapū of Te Patuharakeke and the Ngāti Whātua hapū of Patuharakeke. The marae features the Rangiora meeting house.
