= Taupō Bay =

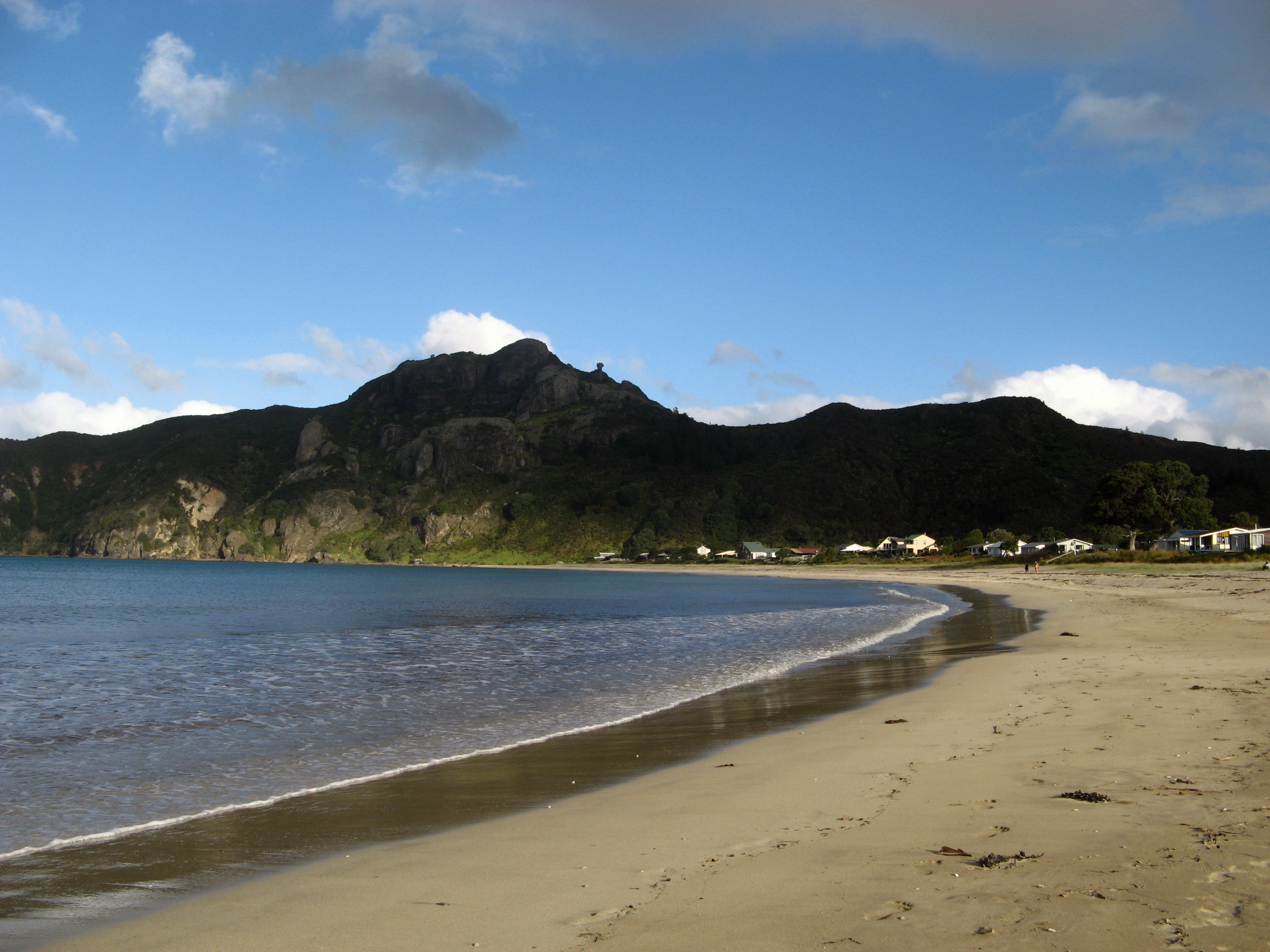
- Taupo Bay
- Interactive map of Taupō Bay
- Coordinates: 34.992124°S 173.708853°E
- Country: New Zealand
- Region: Northland Region
- District: Far North District
- Ward: Bay of Islands-Whangaroa
- Community: Bay of Islands-Whangaroa
- Subdivision: Whangaroa
- Electorates: Northland; Te Tai Tokerau

Government
  - Territorial Authority: Far North District Council
  - Regional council: Northland Regional Council
  - Mayor of Far North: Moko Tepania
  - Northland MP: Grant McCallum
  - Te Tai Tokerau MP: TBD

Taupō Bay is a bay, village, and rural community in the Far North District and Northland Region of New Zealand's North Island. There are about 40 permanent residents and 180 properties. The white sand beach is 1.5 km wide.

The Taupō Marae is a meeting place for the Ngāpuhi / Ngāti Kahu ki Whaingaroa hapū of Ngatirua. It features Te Tiriti meeting house.

== Demographics ==
Taupō Bay is in an SA1 statistical area which covers 48.95 km^{2} (18.90 sq mi) and extends south of State Highway 10. The SA1 area is part of the larger Whakapaku statistical area.

Historical population for the SA1 area
Year	Pop.	±% p.a.
2013	183	—
2018	189	+0.65%
2023	183	−0.64%

The SA1 statistical area had a population of 183 in the 2023 New Zealand census, a decrease of 6 people (−3.2%) since the 2018 census, and unchanged since the 2013 census. There were 81 males and 99 females in 78 dwellings. 1.6% of people identified as LGBTIQ+. The median age was 44.4 years (compared with 38.1 years nationally). There were 36 people (19.7%) aged under 15 years, 24 (13.1%) aged 15 to 29, 78 (42.6%) aged 30 to 64, and 45 (24.6%) aged 65 or older.

People could identify as more than one ethnicity. The results were 65.6% European (Pākehā), 47.5% Māori, 3.3% Pasifika, and 1.6% Asian. English was spoken by 96.7%, Māori language by 6.6%, and other languages by 3.3%. No language could be spoken by 1.6% (e.g., too young to talk). New Zealand Sign Language was known by 1.6%. The percentage of people born overseas was 8.2, compared with 28.8% nationally.

Religious affiliations were 27.9% Christian, 3.3% Māori religious beliefs, 3.3% New Age, and 1.6% other religions. People who answered that they had no religion were 55.7%, and 8.2% of people did not answer the census question.

Of those at least 15 years old, 15 (10.2%) people had a bachelor's or higher degree, 90 (61.2%) had a post-high school certificate or diploma, and 39 (26.5%) people exclusively held high school qualifications. The median income was $26,100, compared with $41,500 nationally. 6 people (4.1%) earned over $100,000 compared to 12.1% nationally. The employment status of those at least 15 was that 48 (32.7%) people were employed full-time, 27 (18.4%) were part-time, and 6 (4.1%) were unemployed.

=== Whakapaku statistical area ===
Whakapaku statistical area covers the western side of the Whangaroa Harbour and extends south to Otangaroa. It has an area of 200.90 km^{2} (77.57 sq mi) and had an estimated population of 810 as of June 2025, with a population density of 4.0 people per km^{2}.

Historical population for Whakapaku
Year	Pop.	±% p.a.
2006	705	—
2013	708	+0.06%
2018	744	+1.00%
2023	777	+0.87%

The Whakapaku had a population of 777 in the 2023 New Zealand census, an increase of 33 people (4.4%) since the 2018 census, and an increase of 69 people (9.7%) since the 2013 census. There were 381 males, 384 females and,12 people of other genders in 324 dwellings. 2.3% of people identified as LGBTIQ+. The median age was 47.9 years (compared with 38.1 years nationally). There were 156 people (20.1%) aged under 15 years, 87 (11.2%) aged 15 to 29, 351 (45.2%) aged 30 to 64, and 183 (23.6%) aged 65 or older.

People could identify as more than one ethnicity. The results were 75.3% European (Pākehā), 47.1% Māori, 2.3% Pasifika, 1.2% Asian, and 2.7% other, which includes people giving their ethnicity as "New Zealander". English was spoken by 97.7%, Māori language by 9.3%, Samoan by 0.4%, and other languages by 4.2%. No language could be spoken by 1.5% (e.g., too young to talk). New Zealand Sign Language was known by 0.4%. The percentage of people born overseas was 10.8, compared with 28.8% nationally.

Religious affiliations were 31.7% Christian, 4.6% Māori religious beliefs, 0.4% Buddhist, 1.2% New Age, and 1.5% other religions. People who answered that they had no religion were 54.4%, and 6.9% of people did not answer the census question.

Of those at least 15 years old, 63 (10.1%) people had a bachelor's or higher degree, 348 (56.0%) had a post-high school certificate or diploma, and 201 (32.4%) people exclusively held high school qualifications. The median income was $26,700, compared with $41,500 nationally. 18 people (2.9%) earned over $100,000, compared to 12.1% nationally. The employment status of those at least 15 was that 210 (33.8%) people were employed full-time, 87 (14.0%) were part-time, and 30 (4.8%) were unemployed.
