= Taheke =

Coordinates: 35.458451°S 173.654277°E

Taheke or Tāheke is a village and rural community in the Far North District and Northland Region of New Zealand's North Island. It is located west of Kaikohe and east of Waima on State Highway 12.

== Marae ==
Tāheke Marae is a meeting place of the local Ngāpuhi hapū of Ngāti Pākau, Ngāti Rauwawe and Te Māhurehure. It includes the Tāhekeroa meeting house.

In October 2020, the Government committed $492,430 from the Provincial Growth Fund to revamp and redesign the marae's wharekai (dining hall).

== Climate ==
Climate data for Punakitere (2km NE of Taheke, 1951–1980)
Month	Jan	Feb	Mar	Apr	May	Jun	Jul	Aug	Sep	Oct	Nov	Dec	Year
Mean daily maximum °C (°F)	23.5 (74.3)	24.0 (75.2)	22.4 (72.3)	19.7 (67.5)	17.0 (62.6)	14.8 (58.6)	14.0 (57.2)	14.7 (58.5)	16.0 (60.8)	17.6 (63.7)	19.7 (67.5)	21.5 (70.7)	18.7 (65.7)
Daily mean °C (°F)	18.8 (65.8)	19.3 (66.7)	18.1 (64.6)	15.9 (60.6)	13.4 (56.1)	11.5 (52.7)	10.5 (50.9)	11.1 (52.0)	12.1 (53.8)	13.8 (56.8)	15.3 (59.5)	17.1 (62.8)	14.7 (58.5)
Mean daily minimum °C (°F)	14.1 (57.4)	14.6 (58.3)	13.7 (56.7)	12.0 (53.6)	9.8 (49.6)	8.2 (46.8)	6.9 (44.4)	7.4 (45.3)	8.2 (46.8)	9.9 (49.8)	10.9 (51.6)	12.7 (54.9)	10.7 (51.3)
Average rainfall mm (inches)	76 (3.0)	117 (4.6)	111 (4.4)	137 (5.4)	157 (6.2)	206 (8.1)	169 (6.7)	175 (6.9)	133 (5.2)	137 (5.4)	110 (4.3)	123 (4.8)	1,651 (65)
Source: NIWA
