= Oromahoe =

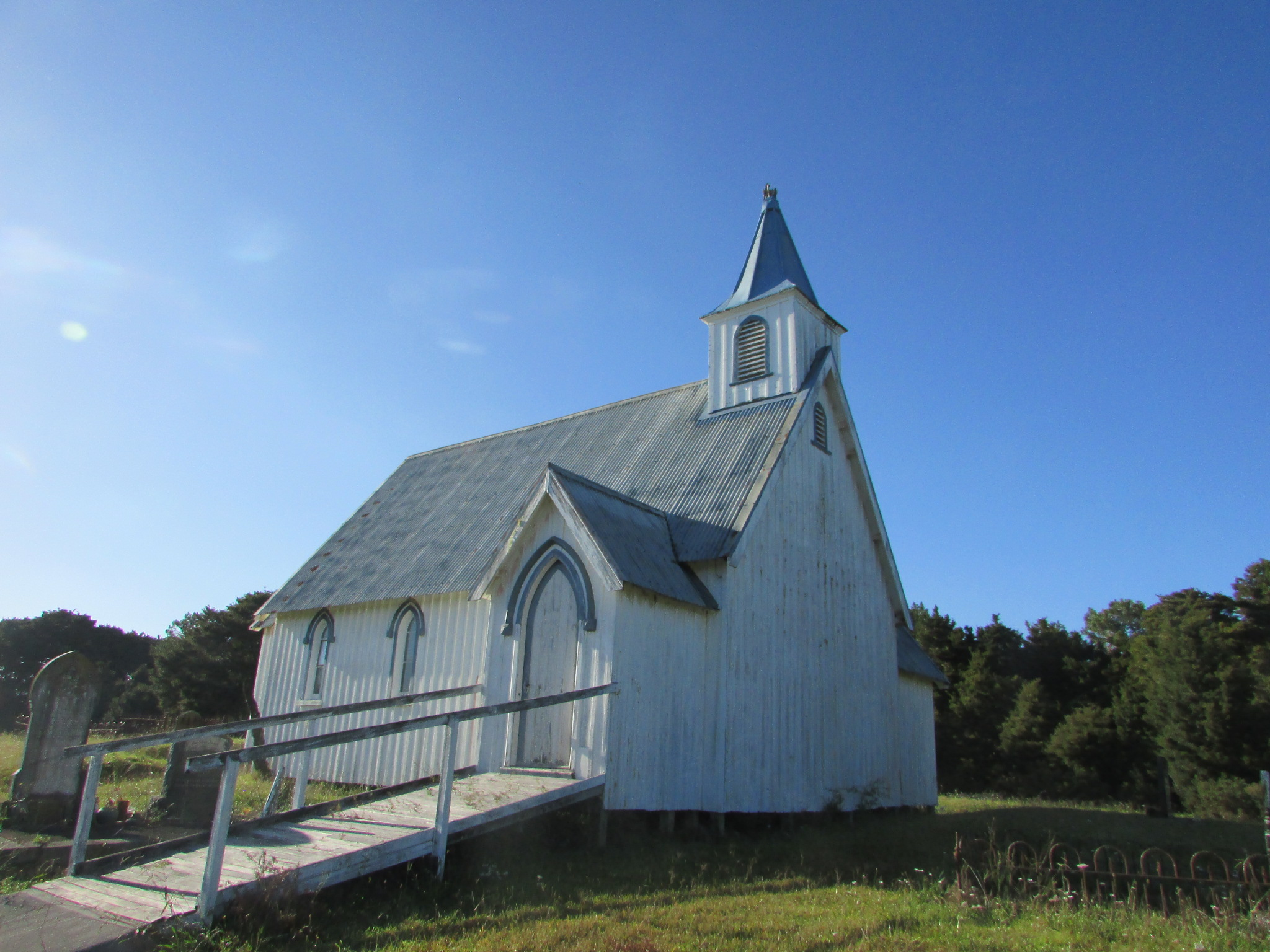
- St Matiu's Church

- Location within Northland Region
- Coordinates: 35°19′14″S 173°58′38″E
- Country: New Zealand
- Region: Northland Region
- District: Far North District

Oromahoe (Māori: Oromāhoe) is a locality in Northland, New Zealand. It lies on state highway 10.

Oromāhoe Marae and Ngāti Kawa meeting house are a meeting ground for the local Ngāpuhi hapū of Ngāti Kawa and Ngāti Rāhiri.

== Education ==
Oromahoe School is a coeducational full primary (years 1–8) school with a decile rating of 6 and a roll of 58 in 2009. It was established as a mission school in the 1870s, and later became a Native School. More than 80% of students live outside the school bus area and are transported to and from school by private vehicles.
