= Ōtaua =

Populated area in Northland, New Zealand

- Interactive map of Ōtaua
- Coordinates: 35.499°S 173.699°E
- Country: New Zealand
- Region: Northland Region
- District: Far North District
- Ward: Kaikohe/Hokianga
- Community: Kaikohe-Hokianga
- Subdivision: South Hokianga
- Electorates: Northland; Te Tai Tokerau

Government
  - Territorial authority: Far North District Council
  - Regional council: Northland Regional Council
  - Mayor of Far North: Moko Tepania
  - Northland MP: Grant McCallum
  - Te Tai Tokerau MP: TBD

Ōtaua is a rural community in the Far North District and Northland Region of New Zealand's North Island.

The local Pukerātā or Ōtaua Marae is a meeting place of the Ngāpuhi hapū of Ngāi Tāwake and Ngaitu te Auru / Ngaitu. It includes Te Rau Tawainui meeting house.

== Demographics ==
Ōtaua locality covers 55.91 km^{2} (21.59 sq mi). It is part of Waimā Forest statistical area.

Historical population
Year	Pop.	±% p.a.
2006	351	—
2013	315	−1.53%
2018	324	+0.57%
2023	312	−0.75%

Ōtaua had a population of 312 in the 2023 New Zealand census, a decrease of 12 people (−3.7%) since the 2018 census, and a decrease of 3 people (−1.0%) since the 2013 census. There were 159 males, 159 females, and 3 people of other genders in 84 dwellings. 1.0% of people identified as LGBTIQ+. There were 75 people (24.0%) aged under 15 years, 63 (20.2%) aged 15 to 29, 117 (37.5%) aged 30 to 64, and 54 (17.3%) aged 65 or older.

People could identify as more than one ethnicity. The results were 40.4% European (Pākehā), 81.7% Māori, 11.5% Pasifika, and 1.9% other, which includes people giving their ethnicity as "New Zealander". English was spoken by 95.2%, Māori by 30.8%, and Samoan by 1.9%. No language could be spoken by 2.9% (e.g. too young to talk). New Zealand Sign Language was known by 1.9%. The percentage of people born overseas was 9.6, compared with 28.8% nationally.

Religious affiliations were 40.4% Christian, and 9.6% Māori religious beliefs. People who answered that they had no religion were 42.3%, and 8.7% of people did not answer the census question.

Of those at least 15 years old, 21 (8.9%) people had a bachelor's or higher degree, 135 (57.0%) had a post-high school certificate or diploma, and 81 (34.2%) people exclusively held high school qualifications. 9 people (3.8%) earned over $100,000 compared to 12.1% nationally. The employment status of those at least 15 was 78 (32.9%) full-time, 24 (10.1%) part-time, and 21 (8.9%) unemployed.
