= Waikare =

- Interactive map of Waikare
- Coordinates: 35°20′20″S 174°14′0″E
- Country: New Zealand
- Region: Northland Region
- District: Far North District
- Ward: Bay of Islands-Whangaroa Ward
- Community: Bay of Islands-Whangaroa
- Subdivision: Russell-Ōpua
- Electorates: Northland; Te Tai Tokerau

Government
  - Territorial Authority: Far North District Council
  - Regional council: Northland Regional Council
  - Mayor of Far North: Moko Tepania
  - Northland MP: Grant McCallum
  - Te Tai Tokerau MP: Mariameno Kapa-Kingi

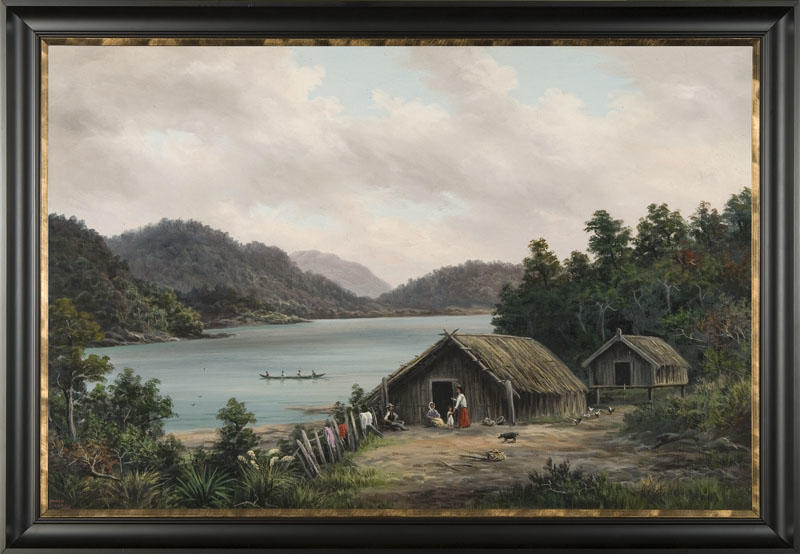
William Baker - Lake Waikare

Waikare is a locality in Northland, New Zealand. The Waikare River flows from the Russell Forest past Waikare and into the Waikare Inlet, which leads into the Bay of Islands.

The population is largely of the Te Kapotai hapū and Ngāti Pare iwi.

The New Zealand Ministry for Culture and Heritage gives a translation of "rippling waters" for Waikare.

== Demographics ==
Waikari is in an SA1 statistical area which covers 85.80 km^{2} (33.13 sq mi). The SA1 area is part of the larger Russell Forest-Rawhiti statistical area.

Historical population
Year	Pop.	±% p.a.
2006	138	—
2013	153	+1.48%
2018	171	+2.25%
2023	213	+4.49%

The SA1 statistical area had a population of 213 in the 2023 New Zealand census, an increase of 42 people (24.6%) since the 2018 census, and an increase of 60 people (39.2%) since the 2013 census. There were 111 males and 102 females in 57 dwellings. 1.4% of people identified as LGBTIQ+. The median age was 32.6 years (compared with 38.1 years nationally). There were 60 people (28.2%) aged under 15 years, 42 (19.7%) aged 15 to 29, 84 (39.4%) aged 30 to 64, and 27 (12.7%) aged 65 or older.

People could identify as more than one ethnicity. The results were 21.1% European (Pākehā), 93.0% Māori, and 7.0% Pasifika. English was spoken by 95.8%, and Māori language by 46.5%. No language could be spoken by 1.4% (e.g. too young to talk). The percentage of people born overseas was 1.4, compared with 28.8% nationally.

Religious affiliations were 36.6% Christian, 5.6% Māori religious beliefs, and 0.0% other religions. People who answered that they had no religion were 47.9%, and 9.9% of people did not answer the census question.

Of those at least 15 years old, 6 (3.9%) people had a bachelor's or higher degree, 96 (62.7%) had a post-high school certificate or diploma, and 51 (33.3%) people exclusively held high school qualifications. The median income was $28,700, compared with $41,500 nationally. The employment status of those at least 15 was that 60 (39.2%) people were employed full-time, 12 (7.8%) were part-time, and 18 (11.8%) were unemployed.

== Marae ==
Waikare or Te Tūruki Marae and Te Huihuinga or Te Aranga o te Pā meeting house is a meeting place for the Ngāpuhi hapū of Ngāti Pare and Te Kapotai.

== Education ==
Te Kura o Waikare, also called Waikare School, is a coeducational full primary (years 1-8) school with a roll of 65 students as of March 2026. It is a Designated Special Character school with the Māori language as the principal language of instruction. The school replaced the previous Waikare School in 2004.
