= Waimā =

Populated area in Northland, New Zealand

- Interactive map of Waimā
- Coordinates: 35°29′20″S 173°35′17″E
- Country: New Zealand
- Region: Northland Region
- District: Far North District
- Ward: Kaikohe/Hokianga
- Community: Kaikohe-Hokianga
- Subdivision: South Hokianga
- Electorates: Northland; Te Tai Tokerau

Government
  - Territorial authority: Far North District Council
  - Regional council: Northland Regional Council
  - Mayor of Far North: Moko Tepania
  - Northland MP: Grant McCallum
  - Te Tai Tokerau MP: TBD

Waimā is a rural community in the Waimā River valley in the south Hokianga area of Northland, New Zealand. The Waimā River drains parts of the Waimā Range and the Waoku plateau, and flows roughly northwards into the Hokianga Harbour. The Waimā community is based on and adjacent to the Waimā river flats, between the hills and where the river is joined by the tidal Taheke River and itself becomes tidal. State Highway 12 runs through the southern part of the valley. Taheke is 9 km to the north-east, Rawene is 15 km to the north-west, and Kaikohe is 28 km to the north-east. The residents are predominantly Māori belonging to the Te Māhurehure hapū (subtribe) of the Ngāpuhi iwi (tribe).

== History and culture ==
=== Before European settlement ===
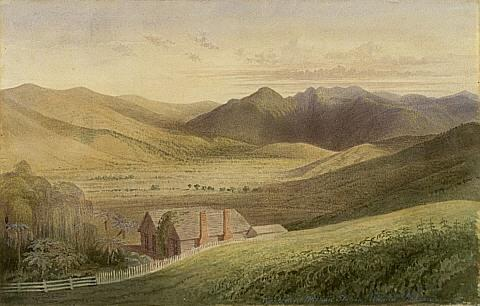
Painting of Wesleyan mission station, looking up the Waimā valley, 1858, by John Kinder

In 1810, an encounter at Waimā during the Musket Wars resulted in the death of the Ngāpuhi chief Te Tauroto. Te Whareumu was killed and Muriwai mortally wounded in a skirmish in March 1828.

The chief of the subtribe Te Māhurehure and Te Urikaiwhare was Mohi Tāwhai (d. 1875), who was a signatory to the Treaty of Waitangi in 1840 and was known as the peacemaker of the North.

=== European settlement period ===
Wesleyans founded the Waimā mission station at Te Poinga, at the lower (northern) end of the valley, in 1839, and a missionary was stationed there until 1894. In the 1870s timber milling commenced in the area. In 1898, people of Waimā refused to pay a tax on dogs, and marched on Rawene in the Dog Tax War. Dairy farming became the predominant economic activity in the first half of the 20th century.

=== Marae ===
Waimā has several marae, all of which are associated with Te Māhurehure, a hapū of the Ngāpuhi iwi. Tuhirangi Marae is on the highway at the southern end of the valley. In October 2020, the Government committed $325,525 from the Provincial Growth Fund to upgrade Tuhirangi Marae. Te Raukura Marae, also on the highway, has no meeting house. Otātara Marae is in the central part of Waimā Valley. Moehau Marae is in the northern part of the valley.

== Demographics ==
Waimā is included in the Waimā Forest statistical area, which covers 237.00 km^{2} (91.51 sq mi) and had an estimated population of 1,140 as of June 2025, with a population density of 4.8 people per km^{2}.

Historical population
Year	Pop.	±% p.a.
2006	1,029	—
2013	873	−2.32%
2018	1,095	+4.64%
2023	1,095	+0.00%

Waimā Forest had a population of 1,095 in the 2023 New Zealand census, unchanged since the 2018 census, and an increase of 222 people (25.4%) since the 2013 census. There were 567 males and 528 females in 336 dwellings. 1.4% of people identified as LGBTIQ+. The median age was 38.7 years (compared with 38.1 years nationally). There were 246 people (22.5%) aged under 15 years, 204 (18.6%) aged 15 to 29, 462 (42.2%) aged 30 to 64, and 183 (16.7%) aged 65 or older.

People could identify as more than one ethnicity. The results were 37.0% European (Pākehā); 81.1% Māori; 7.4% Pasifika; 2.2% Asian; 0.8% Middle Eastern, Latin American and African New Zealanders (MELAA); and 0.5% other, which includes people giving their ethnicity as "New Zealander". English was spoken by 95.6%, Māori language by 28.5%, Samoan by 0.8% and other languages by 2.2%. No language could be spoken by 2.2% (e.g. too young to talk). New Zealand Sign Language was known by 1.1%. The percentage of people born overseas was 7.4, compared with 28.8% nationally.

Religious affiliations were 35.9% Christian, 8.5% Māori religious beliefs, 0.5% New Age, and 0.8% other religions. People who answered that they had no religion were 46.6%, and 8.8% of people did not answer the census question.

Of those at least 15 years old, 63 (7.4%) people had a bachelor's or higher degree, 474 (55.8%) had a post-high school certificate or diploma, and 294 (34.6%) people exclusively held high school qualifications. The median income was $25,000, compared with $41,500 nationally. 24 people (2.8%) earned over $100,000 compared to 12.1% nationally. The employment status of those at least 15 was that 279 (32.9%) people were employed full-time, 87 (10.2%) were part-time, and 87 (10.2%) were unemployed.

== Education ==
Waima School, renamed to Te Kura O Waima, is a coeducational full primary (years 1–8) school and has a roll of 46 students as of July 2026. The school was founded in 1881. During the Dog Tax War of 1898, the government army of 120 men set up camp at Waima School.

== Notable people ==
- Patu Hohepa (1936–2023), academic
- William Satchell (1861–1942), novelist and poet
- Hōne Mohi Tāwhai (c. 1827 – 1894), Ngāpuhi leader and member of the House of Representatives
- Hōne Tōia (c. 1859 – 1933), religious leader and leader of the dog-tax rebellion
