= Waipoua Settlement =

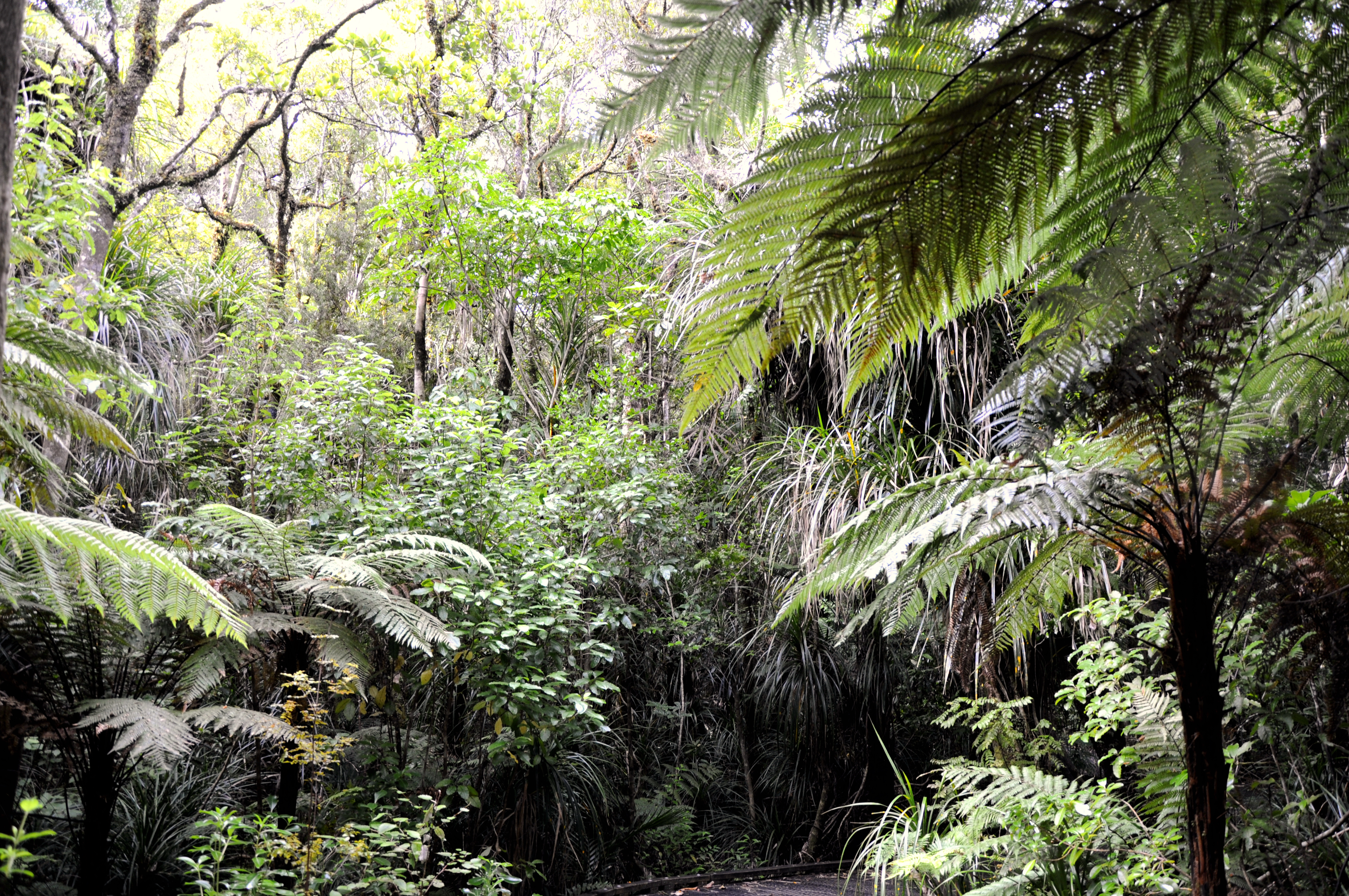
- Waipoua Forest

- Location within Northland Region
- Coordinates: 35°56′18″S 173°52′18″E
- Country: New Zealand
- Region: Northland Region
- District: Kaipara District
- Postcode(s): 0310

Waipoua Settlement is a rural community in the Kaipara District of Northland, in New Zealand's North Island.

== Geographical features ==
It includes the Waipoua Forest, one of the best preserved examples of a kauri forest in New Zealand. It is notable for having two of the largest living kauri trees, Tāne Mahuta and Te Matua Ngahere. Approximately 200,000 people visit Tāne Mahuta every year.

The area has two marae belonging to Te Roroa: Matatina Marae and Tuohu meeting house, and Pananawe Marae and Te Taumata o Tiopira Kinaki meeting house.

== History ==
On 26 February 2025, a wildfire engulfed over 70 hectares of land near Waipoua Settlement. Emergency services have evacuated local residents.
