= Arapohue =

- Coordinates: 36°0′29″S 173°56′43″E
- Country: New Zealand
- Region: Northland Region
- District: Kaipara District

Arapohue is a locality in Northland, New Zealand, approximately 16 km south east of Dargaville

The New Zealand Ministry for Culture and Heritage gives a translation of "Path of the climbing plant" for Arapōhue.

Lime is quarried in the area.

== History and culture ==
In 1806, during the Musket Wars, Ngā Puhi attacked the Te Roroa chief Tāoho at Arapohue, but was repulsed. Joel Samuel Polack passed through in 1832, at which time there was a desolate and decayed village called Warepohuhi in the area.

The Arapohue block (about 79 km^{2}) was sold in the late 1850s for £350, despite a dispute between Ngā Puhi and Ngāti Whātua over claims to the land. The area was heavily forested in kauri. Most of those who purchased lots in the area were absentee owners. In 1876, there were only 30 residents on the 283 holdings of the Arapohue and neighbouring Okahu and Whakahara blocks. The village of Arapohue was owned by John Logan Campbell until 1899. The area was developed as farmland in the early 20th century.

The Kāpehu Marae and its Tāringaroa meeting house are a traditional meeting place of Ngāti Whātua.

== Education ==
Arapohue School is a coeducational full primary (years 1-8) school with a decile rating of 2 and 41 students (as of November 2024). The school was founded in 1876.
