= Awarua River (Northland) =

Coordinates: 35.623310°S 173.845997°E

Location
- Country: New Zealand

Physical characteristics
- Mouth
  - location: Mangakahia River
- Length: 19 km (12 mi)

The Awarua River is a river of the Northland Region of New Zealand. It flows south to meet the Mangakahia River 25 kilometres (16 mi) north of Dargaville.
