= Pakotai =

- Coordinates: 35°41′20″S 173°54′0″E
- Country: New Zealand
- Region: Northland Region
- District: Whangarei District

Pakotai (Māori: Pakōtai) is a locality in the Mangakahia River Valley of Northland, New Zealand. Kaikohe is about 37 km to the north, and Maungatapere is about 34 km to the south east.

Copper was mined at Pakotai from 1947 to 1951.

== Marae ==
The village has one local marae affiliated with the Ngāpuhi hapū of Ngāti Toki, Ngāti Horahia, Ngāti Moe, Ngāti Te Rino, Te Kumutu, Ngāti Whakahotu and Te Parawhau: Te Tārai o Rāhiri Marae and Te Oruoru Recreation Centre and Nukutawhiti meeting house.

== Education ==
Pakotai School is a coeducational full primary (years 1–8) school with a decile rating of 2 and a roll of 24. The school was founded in 1905.
