= Titoki, New Zealand =

Titoki
- Location within Northland Region
- Coordinates: 35°44′02″S 174°03′26″E
- Country: New Zealand
- Region: Northland Region
- District: Whangarei District

Titoki (Māori: Tītoki) is a locality in the Mangakahia Valley of the Northland Region of New Zealand's North Island. Whangārei is 26 km (16 mi) to the east. The Wairua River passes to the east of Titoki, and the Mangakahia River to the west. A hydroelectric plant has been operating at Wairua Falls since 1916. It was upgraded to produce 5.4 Gwh per year in 2007.

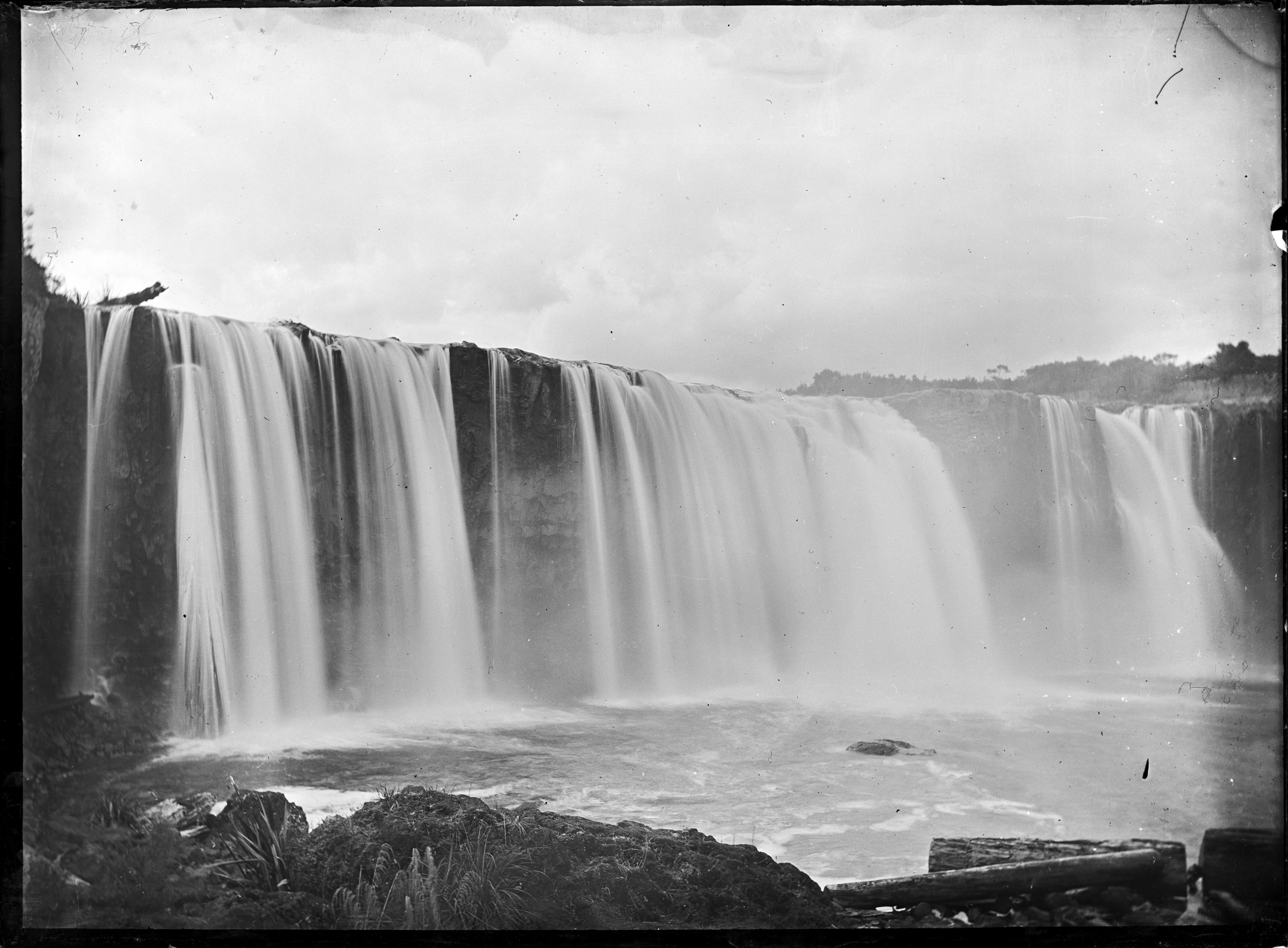
Wairua Falls in 1911, photo by Albert Percy Godber

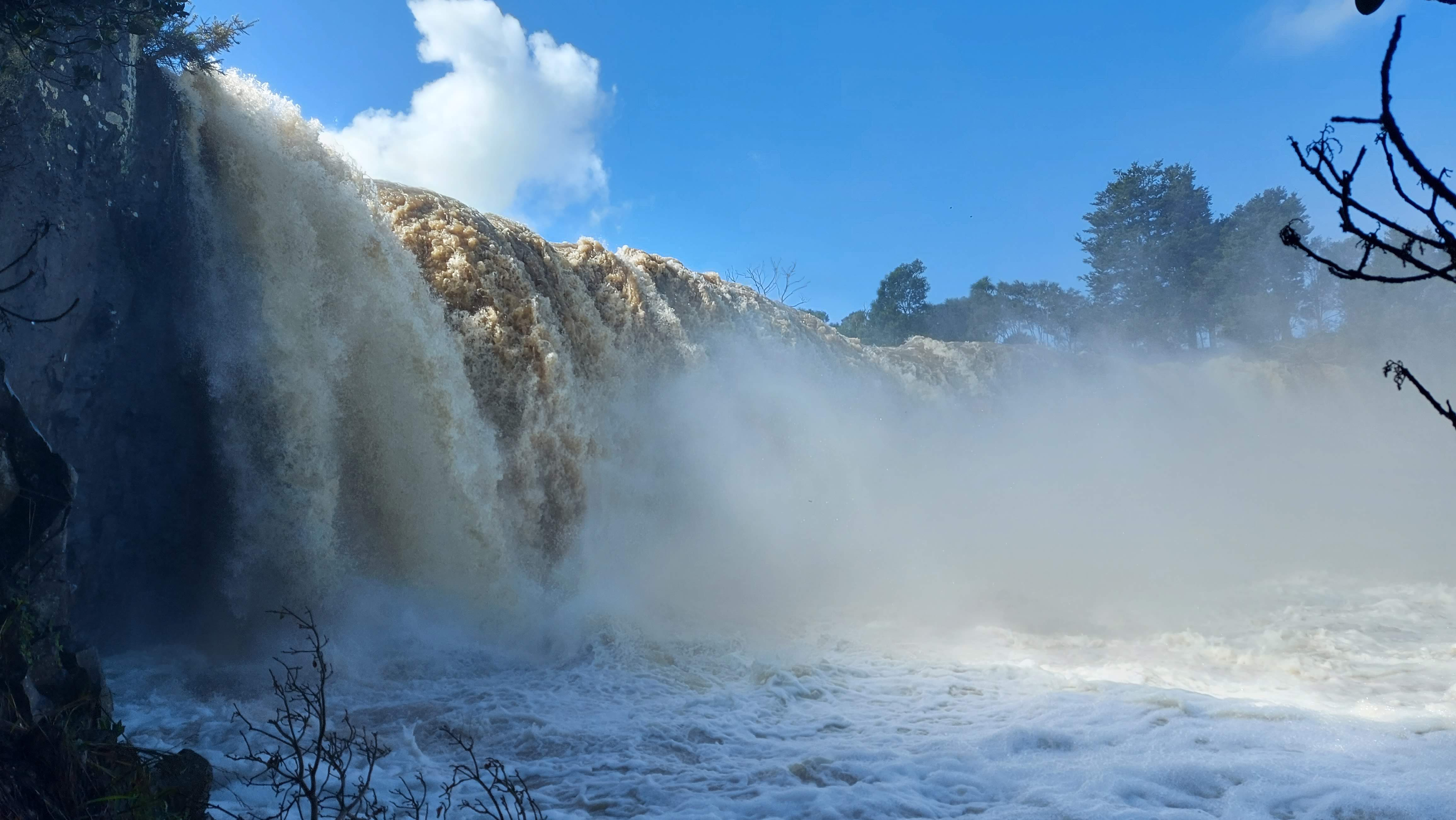
Wairua Falls after heavy rain - viewed from below.

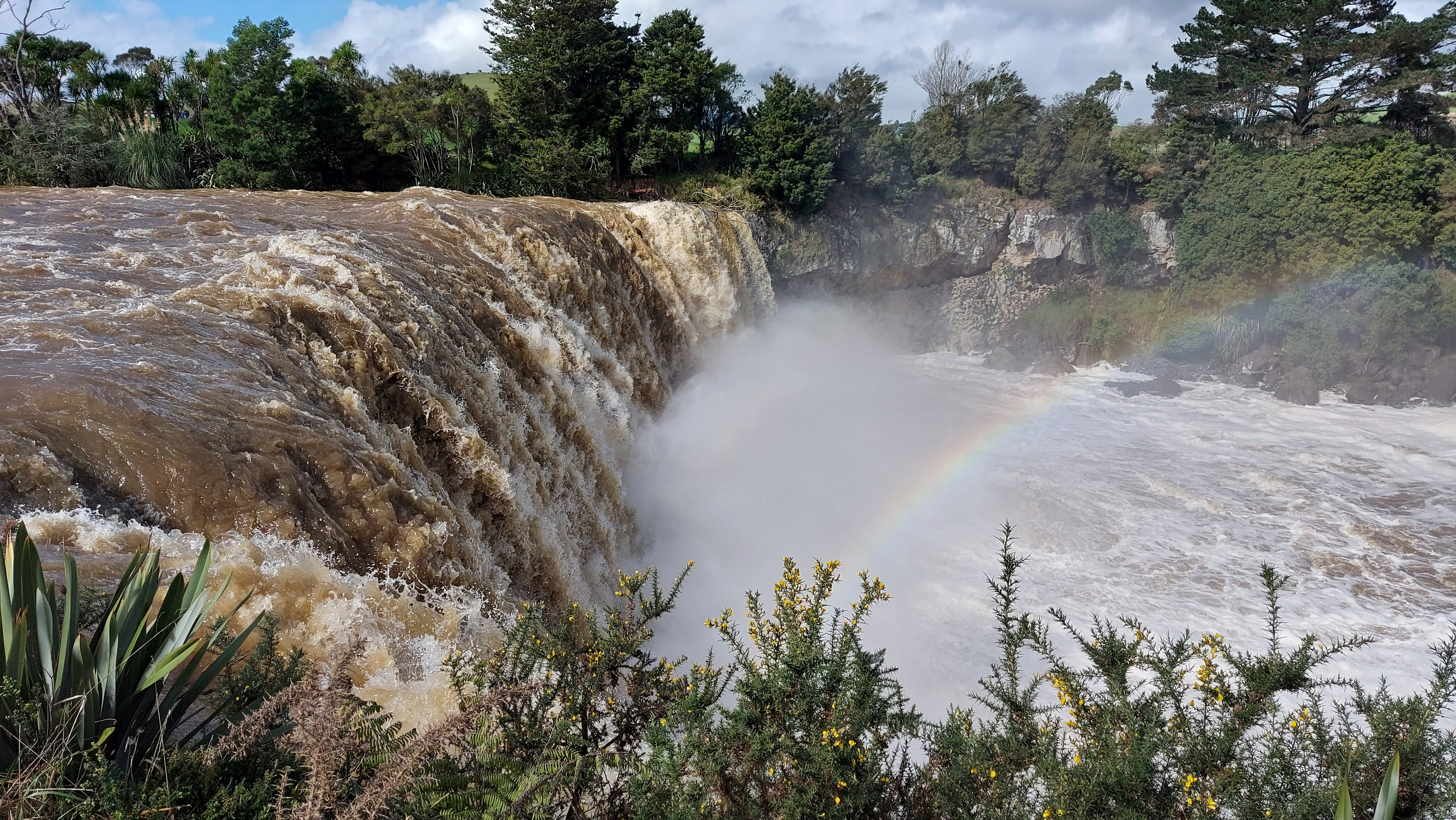
Wairua Falls after heavy rain - viewed from the top of the falls.

The local Korokota Marae is a tribal meeting ground of the Ngāpuhi hapū of Te Parawhau and the Ngāti Whātua hapū of Te Parawhau. It features the Tikitiki o Rangi meeting house.

Mangakahia Area School is a coeducational composite school (years 1–13), with a decile rating of 3 and a roll of 157. The school, previously called Titoki District High School, celebrated its centennial in 2007.

Titoki and the Mangakahia River area were important locations for the late 19th/early 20th century kauri gum digging trade.

== Notable people ==
- Tania Roxborogh, writer
