= Tautoro =

- Interactive map of Tautoro
- Coordinates: 35.478°S 173.840°E
- Country: New Zealand
- Region: Northland Region
- District: Far North District
- Ward: Kaikohe/Hokianga
- Community: Kaikohe-Hokianga
- Subdivision: Kaikohe
- Electorates: Northland; Te Tai Tokerau

Government
  - Territorial Authority: Far North District Council
  - Regional council: Northland Regional Council
  - Mayor of Far North: Moko Tepania
  - Northland MP: Grant McCallum
  - Te Tai Tokerau MP: Mariameno Kapa-Kingi

Area
  - Total: 43.07 km^{2} (16.63 sq mi)

Population (2023 Census)
  - Total: 231
  - Density: 5.36/km^{2} (13.9/sq mi)

Tautoro is a locality about 8 km (5.0 mi) south-southeast of Kaikohe in Northland, New Zealand. The eastern part of the locality has a small scoria cone, Hangunui Pā, the youngest scoria cone Tauanui (351 m (1,152 ft)) in the southern part of the Kaikohe-Bay of Islands volcanic field, Lake Tauanui, and the hill Tautoro (463 m (1,519 ft)) which has which gives the locality's name.

== History and culture ==
Tautoro has Ngāpuhi marae:

- Te Maata Marae and Te Whare Huinga are connected to Ngāti Moerewa and Ngāti Rangi.
- Te Rīngi and Māhūhū ki te Rangi meeting house are affiliated with Ngāti Moerewa.
- Te Hungāiti is also a meeting ground for both hapū.

In October 2020, the Government committed $90,424 from the Provincial Growth Fund to upgrade Te Maata Marae and Te Kotahitanga Marae, creating 12 jobs.

=== Name ===
Tautoro can mean to stretch forward and there are two versions of how the Ngāpuhi ancestor Rāhiri, gave the name. Either at Tautoro he rested, stretching out his cloak string (tau: string; toro: to stretch) or his shoulder garment was burnt (tau: cord; toro: burned).

== Demographics ==
Tautoro is in an SA1 statistical area which covers 43.07 km^{2} (16.63 sq mi). The SA1 area is part of the larger Mataraua Forest statistical area.

Historical population for Tautoro and surrounds
Year	Pop.	±% p.a.
2006	189	—
2013	213	+1.72%
2018	210	−0.28%
2023	231	+1.92%

The SA1 statistical area had a population of 231 in the 2023 New Zealand census, an increase of 21 people (10.0%) since the 2018 census, and an increase of 18 people (8.5%) since the 2013 census. There were 114 males and 120 females in 66 dwellings. 2.6% of people identified as LGBTIQ+. The median age was 36.3 years (compared with 38.1 years nationally). There were 60 people (26.0%) aged under 15 years, 39 (16.9%) aged 15 to 29, 96 (41.6%) aged 30 to 64, and 33 (14.3%) aged 65 or older.

People could identify as more than one ethnicity. The results were 35.1% European (Pākehā); 80.5% Māori; 6.5% Pasifika; 1.3% Asian; and 1.3% Middle Eastern, Latin American and African New Zealanders (MELAA). English was spoken by 94.8%, and Māori language by 28.6%. No language could be spoken by 2.6% (e.g. too young to talk). New Zealand Sign Language was known by 1.3%. The percentage of people born overseas was 9.1, compared with 28.8% nationally.

Religious affiliations were 33.8% Christian, 2.6% Māori religious beliefs, 1.3% Buddhist, 1.3% New Age, and 1.3% other religions. People who answered that they had no religion were 46.8%, and 14.3% of people did not answer the census question.

Of those at least 15 years old, 18 (10.5%) people had a bachelor's or higher degree, 99 (57.9%) had a post-high school certificate or diploma, and 48 (28.1%) people exclusively held high school qualifications. The median income was $25,500, compared with $41,500 nationally. 3 people (1.8%) earned over $100,000 compared to 12.1% nationally. The employment status of those at least 15 was that 60 (35.1%) people were employed full-time, 18 (10.5%) were part-time, and 12 (7.0%) were unemployed.

=== Mataraua Forest statistical area ===
The statistical area of Mataraua Forest covers 272.81 km^{2} (105.33 sq mi) and had an estimated population of 560 as of June 2025, with a population density of 2.1 people per km^{2}.

Historical population for Mataraua Forest
Year	Pop.	±% p.a.
2006	546	—
2013	477	−1.91%
2018	507	+1.23%
2023	537	+1.16%

Mataraua Forest had a population of 537 in the 2023 New Zealand census, an increase of 30 people (5.9%) since the 2018 census, and an increase of 60 people (12.6%) since the 2013 census. There were 270 males and 270 females in 177 dwellings. 2.2% of people identified as LGBTIQ+. The median age was 39.9 years (compared with 38.1 years nationally). There were 117 people (21.8%) aged under 15 years, 99 (18.4%) aged 15 to 29, 231 (43.0%) aged 30 to 64, and 93 (17.3%) aged 65 or older.

People could identify as more than one ethnicity. The results were 40.2% European (Pākehā); 74.9% Māori; 6.7% Pasifika; 1.1% Asian; 0.6% Middle Eastern, Latin American and African New Zealanders (MELAA); and 1.1% other, which includes people giving their ethnicity as "New Zealander". English was spoken by 96.1%, Māori language by 24.6%, Samoan by 0.6%, and other languages by 1.7%. No language could be spoken by 3.4% (e.g. too young to talk). New Zealand Sign Language was known by 1.1%. The percentage of people born overseas was 8.4, compared with 28.8% nationally.

Religious affiliations were 40.2% Christian, 2.2% Māori religious beliefs, 1.1% Buddhist, 0.6% New Age, and 1.1% other religions. People who answered that they had no religion were 45.3%, and 10.6% of people did not answer the census question.

Of those at least 15 years old, 39 (9.3%) people had a bachelor's or higher degree, 240 (57.1%) had a post-high school certificate or diploma, and 132 (31.4%) people exclusively held high school qualifications. The median income was $27,500, compared with $41,500 nationally. 12 people (2.9%) earned over $100,000 compared to 12.1% nationally. The employment status of those at least 15 was that 156 (37.1%) people were employed full-time, 48 (11.4%) were part-time, and 36 (8.6%) were unemployed.

== Education ==
Tautoro School is a coeducational full primary (years 1-8) school with a roll of 149 students as of July 2026.

The school celebrated its centenary in 2006. It was originally called Tautoro Native School.
