= Ngāpuhi / Ngāti Kahu ki Whaingaroa =

Māori iwi (tribe) in Aotearoa New Zealand

- Iwi (tribe) in Māoridom
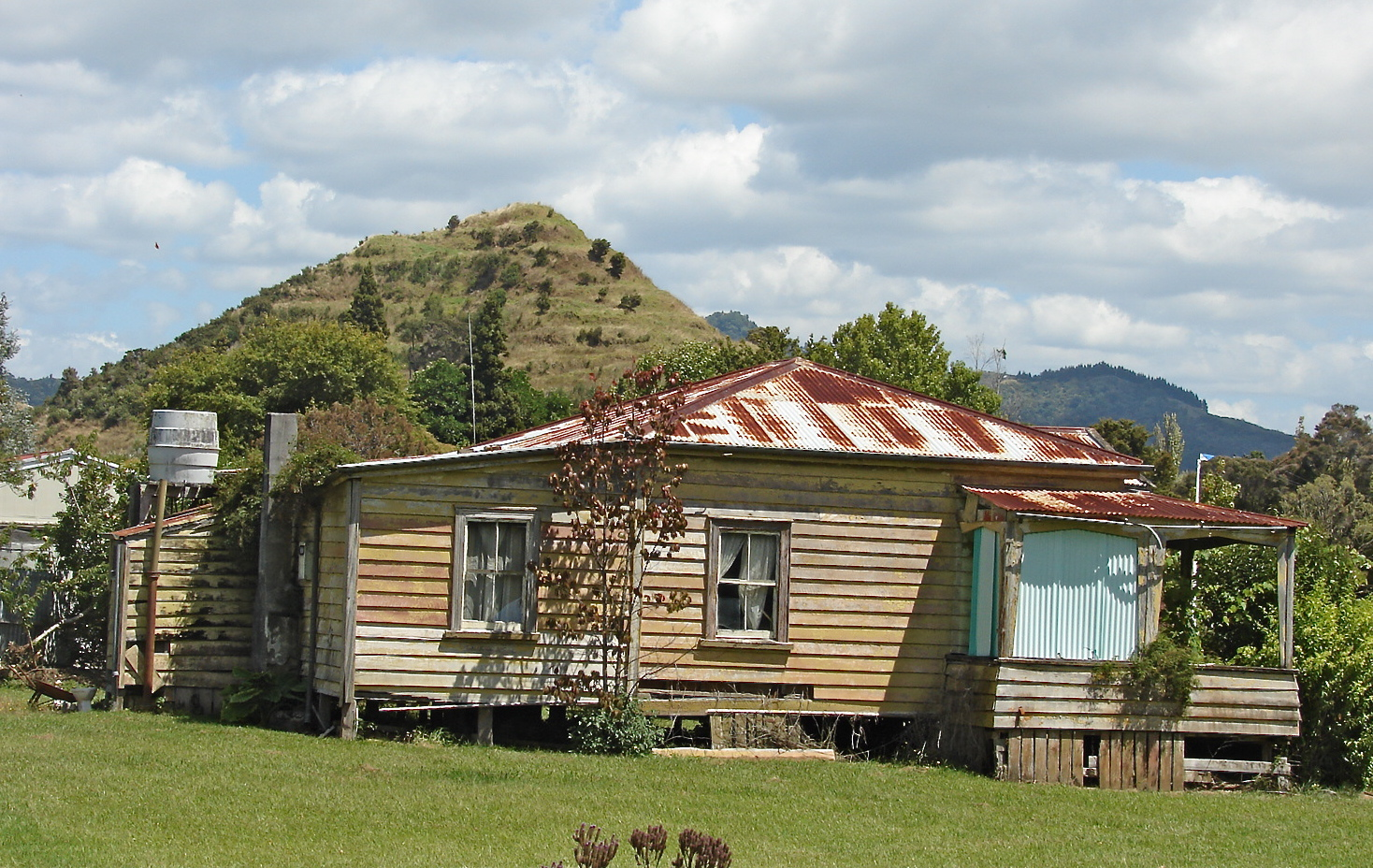
- Pohue-nui Pā
- Rohe (region): Northland, New Zealand
- Website: www.whaingaroa.iwi.nz

Ngāpuhi / Ngāti Kahu ki Whaingaroa are a Māori iwi from the Whangaroa harbour area in Northland, New Zealand.

The iwi's rohe (tribal territory) covers

Two similarly named iwi — Ngāpuhi and Ngāti Kahu ki Whangaroa — are also located in Northland.

== See also ==
- Ngāti Kahu ki Whangaroa
- List of Māori iwi
