= Hapū =

Sub-tribe in Māoridom

In Māori and New Zealand English, a hapū ("subtribe", or "clan") functions as "the basic political unit within Māori society". A Māori person can belong to or have links to many hapū. Historically, each hapū had its own chief and normally operated independently of its iwi (tribe).

== Etymology ==
The word hapū literally means "pregnant", and its usage in a socio-political context is a metaphor for the genealogical connection that unites hapū members. Similarly, the Māori word for land, whenua, can also mean "placenta", metaphorically indicating the connection between people and land, and the Māori word for tribe, iwi, can also mean "bones", indicating a link to ancestors.

== Definition ==
As named divisions of iwi (tribes), hapū membership is determined by genealogical descent; a hapū consists of a number of whānau (extended family) groups. The Māori scholar Hirini Moko Mead states the double meanings of the word hapū emphasise the importance of being born into a hapū group. As a metaphor this is "the members being born of the same womb", and "conveys the idea of growth, indicating that a hapū is capable of containing many whānau."

In the 1870 census the Whakatōhea iwi had five named hapū ranging in size from 51 to 165 people. Some were apparently overlooked, as an iwi register from 1874 showed two more hapū, but these had only 22 and 44 members respectively. The hapū of this iwi ranged in size from 22 to 188. In 1874, hapū still had a small male-female imbalance overall with 6 of the 7 iwi having far more males than females. In the four-year period between the census and the register, all the hapū had grown significantly—at a time when popular opinion had it that the Māori population was in decline. Ngāti Rua gained 8, Ngāti Patu gained 28, Ngāti Tama gained 63, Ngāti Ira lost 4, and Ngāti Ngahere gained 17. These population gains were at a time when the iwi had land confiscated by the government for their support of various anti-government movements. Some hapū in other iwi were larger.

== History ==
Before the arrival of Pākehā, the normal day-to-day operating group in Māori society seems to have been the smaller whānau. Each hapū had its own chief and normally operated independently of the tribe (iwi) group. By the 1820s Māori had realised the economic benefits of working in larger groups—especially when it came to trading with ships. The larger hapū could work more effectively to produce surplus flax, potatoes, smoked heads and pigs in exchange for blankets, tobacco, axes and trade muskets. In warfare the hapū operated as the standard grouping for warriors during the period of the Musket Wars (1807–1842). Hapū would unite politically under their own chief, to form much larger armies of up to several thousand warriors, although it was common for hapū to retain independence within the larger group.

Te Maire Tau noted in his study of Ngāi Tahu migrations that hapū size and names were volatile, with hapū splitting into sister groups when they grew in size or when migrating. New hapū often adopted names from events associated with the migration. Likewise the same group of people would change their name according to different circumstances. Name changes primarily asserted rights to resources given to a named hapū, or emphasised a link to an ancestor with mana in a particular area. Tau states that hapū names and locations have become more stable in more recent times.

Missionaries such as Henry Williams noted that even in times of war against another iwi, hapū usually operated independently. In the period of the Musket Wars (1807–1842) many of the battles involved fighting between competing hapū rather than different iwi. It was not uncommon for two hapū from the same iwi to clash.

Hapū were frequently the political unit that sold land to the Europeans: in the 20 years after the signing of the Treaty of Waitangi in 1840, according to Native Affairs Minister William Richmond, different hapū or comparatively small groups of individuals sold half of all the blocks sold under the Treaty. Richmond said that hapū or small groups sold all the land sold north of Auckland, some in Hawke's Bay, in the Wairarapa valley, in the Waikato at Raglan, and in sales by Te Āti Awa in Wellington and Taranaki.
