= Rangatira Moetara =

Māori chief (died 1880)

- Born: Rangatira
- Died: 5 September 1880; Waimamaku, Hokianga, New Zealand
- Relatives: Moetara (brother); Hapakuku Moetara (son); Mārama Russell (granddaughter)

Rangatira Moetara (died 5 September 1880) was a Māori rangatira (chief) of Ngāti Korokoro hapū, based in Pākanae.

== Family ==
Born as Rangatira, he had at least one sister, Wharo, (Note: The Dictionary of New Zealand Biography claims that Wharo was the daughter of Moetara.) and two brothers, his older brother, Moetara, and his younger brother, Te Aitu. (Note: The Dictionary of New Zealand Biography claims that a Te Aitū was either the father or uncle of the brothers, however, it is unknown if they are referring to the same person or if there was another relative with the name Te Aitu.) He married Te Hana, who was the niece of Tāoho. With her, he had at least one daughter, Hiria Tiopira, and at least six sons, including Wiremu and Hapakuku; (Note: The Waitangi Tribunal Te Roroa report records three children of Rangatira, Hapakuku Moetara, Hiria Tiopira, and Wiremu Ponga Rangatira Moetara. On the other hand, Te Karere Maori records Rangatira Moetara's sixth son, Werumu Pomare, however, it is unknown whether Wiremu Ponga Rangatira Moetara and Werumu Pomare Moetara were the same person.) the latter of which was the father of Mārama Russell.

== Biography ==
In 1810, Rangatira was recorded as having been present when his people were defeated by Te Rauparaha at Waimā. He also took part in the Amiowhenua expedition and was one of the Ngāpuhi leaders at Te Ika-a-ranganui in 1825. On 3 May 1828, Rangatira and Moetara were noted as being unable to protect the survivors of the schooner Enterprise, however, when the Fortitude went ashore at the Whirinaki River in 1833, they intervened to protect the interests of the shipwrecked people.

In 1833, Rangatira fought alongside Moetara against Ngāti Manawa at Motukauri. Moetara was upset that the iwi was benefiting from trading with James Reddy Clendon and the Fortitude. Rangatira and 49 other rangatira signed a letter dated May 1855, stating that during the conflict they had not harmed any Pākehā and had instead defended Clendon's property.

Rangatira became rangatira of Ngāti Korokoro in 1838 upon the death of his brother, Moetara, adopting the name Rangatira Moetara.

On 12 February 1840, (Note: The Dictionary of New Zealand Biography claims that Rangatira Moetara signed the treaty on 13 February 1840.) he signed the Treaty of Waitangi at Māngungu, Hokianga. Alongside Tāmati Wāka Nene, Eruera Maihi Patuone and Makoare Te Taonui, he sang a song of welcome to William Hobson, expressing their support for the governor and the treaty. In 1855, he told Governor Thomas Gore Browne that the people of Hokianga felt deserted by the Pākehā they had befriended. Later in 1870, he expressed desire to the Governor for Pākehā settlers to continue to come to the region and set up flax and flour mills, stating that he wanted to see local produce shipped out.

Rangatira Moetara later took on the role of assessor for the Native Land Court, having previously sold land alongside several chiefs at different locations, such as Whiria, Opononi, and Pakanui (Taikapiti) to various buyers. In 1858, alongside Wī Tana Pāpāhia and Hohaia, he provided Dillon Bell a sketch of the outstanding land claims in Hokianga, where six of the seven Te Wahapu transactions were drawn. Rangatira Moetara claimed that the land has been a Māori sale for the benefit of Wharo's children; Wharo had lived and had children with Captain John Rodolphus Kent, the purchaser of the land. The land was transferred to someone named Mitchell in payment for one of Kent's debts, which, in turn, was transferred to William Young for 500 pounds.

In 1874, the claim was brought forward to Frederick Edward Maning in the Native Land Court by T. E. Young, William's son. Rangatira Moetara continued to object the ownership of the land, however, despite this, Young's descendants were awarded 225 acres of land at Koutu in 1880.

In 1863, Rangatira Moetara was named as a member of the Bay of Islands council, which subsequently resolved to ban alcohol in the region. In 1878, he was identified as one of the leading rangatira of the Ngāpuhi iwi. In 1879, Rangatira Moetara, alongside 108 others, petitioned for better infrastructure, the Crown to build a telegraph line, and construction of roads and railways between Hokianga and Paihia.

He died on 5 September 1880 at Waimamaku. The Dictionary of New Zealand Biography incorrectly reports his death date as 1 November 1880.
