= Hapakuku Moetara =

Māori chief (died 1902)

Hapakuku Moetara (died 1902), also known as Tuohu Moetara, was a Māori chief of Ngāti Korokoro and Te Roroa based in Waimamaku in the Hokianga region.

== Life ==
Moetara was born to Rangatira Moetara and his wife, Te Hana. He also had a sister called Hiria Tiopira and a brother called Wiremu Moetara. He was a descendant of the prominent chief Pāpāhia, one of the signatories of the Treaty of Waitangi.

Through his mother, he was connected to the senior line of Te Roroa, and claimed interests in the iwi's land. He and his relatives sold and leased land between 1840 and 1875. He was one of the shareholders of the Hokianga Claim.

As a chief, he was a leading promoter for the temperance movement in New Zealand. He also served as a magistrate's court assessor and a member of the first Hokianga County Council. Moetara served as a mediator during the Dog Tax War, however his joint attempt with fellow Hokianga chief Rei Te Tai to reason with Hōne Tōia and the Waimā Māori ultimately failed.

He later married Mere Hira, who was the daughter of Te Hira Te Kawau and a granddaughter of Apihai Te Kawau. Moetara was the father of Mārama Russell, Rawiri Hapakuku Moetara, and Tarawera Moetara.

He died on 1 January 1902.
