= Hinewhare Harawira =

New Zealand Māori activist (1954–2025)

- Born: 1954; Auckland, New Zealand
- Died: 7 April 2025 (aged 71); Auckland
- Children: 5
- Mother: Titewhai Harawira
- Relatives: Hone Harawira (brother); Peeni Henare (nephew)

Hinewhare Te Turikātuku Ruiha Harawira (1954–2025) was a New Zealand Māori activist. The daughter of activist Titewhai Harawira, Harawira became known for her at times controversial advocacy for tino rangatiratanga, with the New Zealand Herald describing her as "the most unpredictable" member of the Māori protest movement.

== Biography ==
Harawira was born and raised in Auckland, New Zealand, and was a member of the Ngāpuhi and Te Aupōuri iwi. Her mother was noted Māori activist Titewhai Harawira; one of her brothers, Hone Harawira, went on to serve as a Member of Parliament for the Te Pāti Māori. Harawira had five children of her own and lived in Avondale, a suburb of Auckland.

In 1984, Harawira was elected to serve as the representative for Aotearoa at the International Indian Treaty Council.

Harawira worked as a coordinator of a Playcentre in Avondale. She went on to serve as one of three coordinators of the New Zealand Playcentre Federation's Māori component, Te Rangatahi. As an educator, Harawira worked to incorporate principles of the Treaty of Waitangi into Playcentre's policies. She also participated in Māori language revitalisation efforts, including Kohanga Reo and Kura kaupapa Māori.

Harawira was a proponent of tino rangatiratanga, and led numerous hīkoi, including at Waitangi Day celebrations and at the New Zealand Parliament. Described as an activist who was "not afraid to use her fists", Harawira was arrested on multiple occasions while participating in protests, and received two six-month prison sentences, including in 1995 after she spat at Catherine Tizard, the then-Governor General of New Zealand, during a Waitangi Day commemoration.

While known for her protests at Waitangi Day commemorations, Harawira also acted as a host and guide at marae in Te Tii Waitangi and Te Whare Rūnanga. In 2012, Harawira was elected as a trustee of the Te Tii (Waitangi) B3 Trust. In 2013, her fellow trustees filed a case with the Māori Land Court requesting Harawira's removal as a trustee after she performed a whakapohane, a Māori act of displaying the buttocks seen as insulting. Harawira acknowledged having done so in response to verbal abuse she experienced during the eviction of a neighbour, and justified the act as part of Tikanga Māori. A judge ruled that while the act was concerning, there was no evidence that Harawira regularly performed whakapohane and so did not remove her from her role, though expressed concern about how the act could damage trust in the organisation and criticised Harawira for declining to apologise.

Harawira also worked as an anti-violence campaigner, starting her own charity, Te Pataka Ki Waitangi, to address the issue. Harawira stepped down from her role in 2013 after three of her adult sons were convicted of assaulting a 12-year-old boy.

Harawira publicly supported the establishment of Te Pāti Māori and the electoral campaigns of her brother Hone.

Harawira died of cancer at Auckland City Hospital on 7 April 2025 at the age of 71. Her tangihanga was held at her home marae in Whakapara. Following her death, Labour MP Peeni Henare, Harawira's nephew, paid tribute to her, describing her as "tough and unwavering in her commitment to tikanga, Māoritanga and mana motuhake".
