= Mārama Russell =

Mārama Russell (c. 1875 – 1952) was a notable New Zealand midwife and tribal leader. Of Māori descent, she identified with the Ngāpuhi, Ngāti Whātua and Te Roroa iwi.

== Biography ==
Mārama Moetara was born in Waimamaku, Northland, New Zealand in about 1875. Her father was Hapakuku Moetara, a prominent chief of Ngāti Korokoro and Te Roroa, and the son of Rangatira Moetara, a chief of Ngāti Korokoro. Her mother was Mere Hira, whose father, Te Hira Te Kawau, was the son of Apihai Te Kawau, a paramount chief of Ngāti Whatua.

On 13 March, 1897, she married her husband, Frederick George Russell, nephew of Frederick Nene Russell. They later had 14 children together.

In her mid-30s, Russell became a spiritual healer, midwife, and seer. As a midwife, she was notable for her role in curing infertility, determining the gender of unborn babies, delivering babies, and inducing birth through massage, manipulation, karakia, and potions. As a seer, she was famed for her ability to diagnose and visualise illnesses before symptoms had been described to her.

Russell died at her home at Koutu Point on 8 December, 1952, at the age of 76. She is buried with her husband in Pākanae cemetery, Hokianga.
