= Titewhai Harawira =

New Zealand Māori activist (1932–2023)

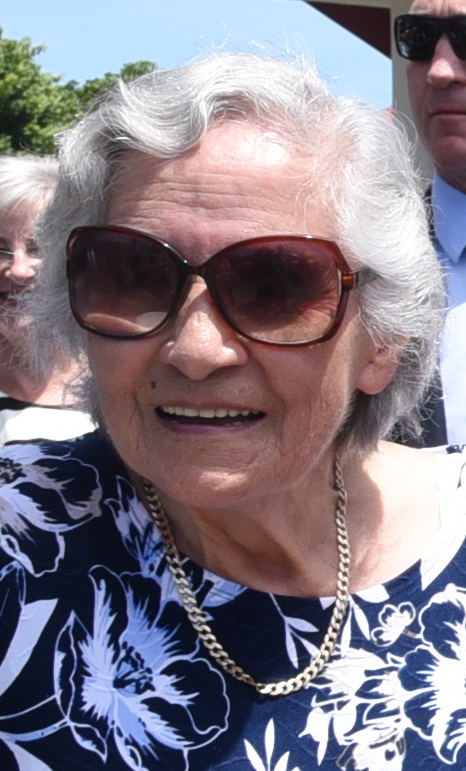
- Harawira in 2017
- Born: Titewhai Te Hoia Hinewhare; 1932; Whakapara, New Zealand
- Died: 25 January 2023 (aged 90); Avondale, New Zealand
- Occupation: Political activist
- Spouse: John Puriri Harawira (m. 1952; died 1977)
- Children: 12, including Hone and Hinewhare

Titewhai Te Hoia Hinewhare Harawira (Note: Harawira's middle name is given in reliable sources as Te Hoia or Te Huia. This article uses the former, used for example by The New Zealand Herald and Radio New Zealand. The latter is used for example by Stuff.) (1932 – 25 January 2023) was a New Zealand Māori activist. Born in Whakapara and descended from Ngāpuhi chiefs, Harawira was an outspoken political commentator and a civil rights campaigner beginning with her involvement with activist group Ngā Tamatoa in the 1970s. She became a nationally recognised figure due in part to her role escorting New Zealand prime ministers onto the marae (meeting place) during annual Waitangi Day celebrations.

After her death in January 2023, she was described by Māori development minister Willie Jackson as an important leader in New Zealand during the Māori renaissance. Her activities and style of activism were at times controversial, including when in 1998 she objected to Helen Clark, then the leader of New Zealand's opposition, speaking on the marae, as Māori women were not allowed to do so.

== Life and career ==
=== Early life and family ===
Harawira was born in 1932 in Whakapara, the eldest of seven children. She was part of the iwi (tribes) of Ngāpuhi and Ngāti Wai, and descended from Ngāpuhi chiefs Eruera Maihi Patuone and Tāmati Wāka Nene. She was raised by her mother's parents, attended Whakapara Native School followed by the Queen Victoria School for Māori Girls, and trained as a nurse. In 1952 she married John Puriri Harawira, a Māori warden and taxi driver, and they had twelve children (three through whāngai adoption), including New Zealand politician Hone Harawira and activist Hinewhare Harawira. Shortly after their marriage they moved to Avondale in Auckland.

Harawira and her husband were founding members of Hoani Waititi Marae and she was active in the Māori Women's Welfare League. She later recalled that she would visit the children's schools to ensure their Māori names were being spelled and pronounced correctly: "It was necessary for me to enforce a safety barrier around my children so that they would feel comfortable about being Maori and having a language to be proud of." Her husband died in 1977 when their youngest child was eight years old. After his death, she worked part-time including as a telephone exchange operator.

=== 1970s to 1990s ===
In the 1970s she became one of the leading members of the Māori activist group Ngā Tamatoa. The group presented a petition of over 30,000 signatures to Parliament in 1972. Harawira helped gather signatures, and has said the petition led to the revitalisation of the Māori language through the Maori Language Act 1987, the development of Māori language immersion schools like kōhanga reo, kura kaupapa and wharekura, Māori Television and iwi radio stations, and wānanga (Māori tertiary education providers). In later years, she explained:

We were determined to rescue our language because we felt and we believed, and we believe today, that a people without its language is a people that die.

In the 1974 local elections, she stood unsuccessfully for the Auckland City Council on a Labour Party ticket. In 1975 following the retirement of Hugh Watt, she was one of twenty-seven candidates who sought Labour Party selection for the Onehunga electorate, but lost to Frank Rogers.

In 1975 she was one of the organisers of the Māori land march, a hikoi (protest march) from Northland to Wellington to protest against the taking of Māori land. On arriving at Parliament she led an occupation of the Parliament grounds for two months, against the wishes of the public leader of the march, Whina Cooper. She also criticised then prime minister Robert Muldoon and his National party government for what she described as their "racist attitudes", particularly towards young Māori. In 1979 she was part of a small group which formed the Waitangi Action Committee to shut down Waitangi Day celebrations until the Treaty of Waitangi was honoured. Eva Rickard and Harawira led a hikoi at Waitangi in 1984.

In the late 1980s, she established the Whare Paia mental health unit for Māori at Carrington Hospital; in 1989, she was jailed for nine months for assaulting a patient, with four other staff members also convicted, including her daughter and son. Harawira claimed that the victim had sexually assaulted a staff member; however, the sentencing judge called the attacks "an arrogant and frightening abuse of authority and power", and noted that Harawira should have used her authority to prevent the assault. News website Stuff noted that this incident overshadowed her "lauded work with Māori health initiatives". As a consequence of her conviction, she was unable to stand for election to the Auckland Area Health Board in 1989 as planned, and her nomination to be on the Māori advisory committee to Auckland City Council in 1995 was rejected.

In 1990 Harawira went to the Netherlands to ask the Dutch government to take back the name "New Zealand" so that the original Māori name of "Aotearoa" could be used for the country instead.

=== Waitangi Day role ===
For many years, Harawira undertook the informal role of welcoming and accompanying the New Zealand prime minister onto Te Tii marae at Waitangi during celebrations for Waitangi Day. Ngāti Hine leader Pita Tipene noted that although Harawira had strong political views and was often critical of the government, she was always respectful in this role and "differentiated between politics and people".

In 1998 Harawira publicly objected to Helen Clark, then the leader of the opposition party, speaking on the marae during the pōwhiri (welcoming ceremony). Harawira explained that she objected to a non-Māori woman being given speaking rights when Ngāpuhi women, like those of most iwi, were traditionally prevented from speaking on the marae. Clark was shown on television in tears (later, she said that the tears were "not for myself but for the ruination, yet again, of an event which has so much potential for healing, reconciliation, and taking matters forward"). At the time, Clark observed that other women had spoken at the marae without issue, including then prime minister Jenny Shipley who had spoken the day before. She said she would not celebrate Waitangi Day at Waitangi in the future unless she was treated respectfully.

In 2000, after her election as prime minister, Clark attended Waitangi for the celebrations but did not visit Te Tii marae. In May that year, Harawira wrote to Clark apologising for the hurt caused, but noting that she would be "watching what your government does with guarded expectation". She also said that she and Clark had met to discuss the issue, although did not give details. In 2002, Clark returned to Te Tii marae and was escorted by Harawira; Clark agreed it was "time to move on" and that it was important to re-establish a relationship between the government and Ngāpuhi. Thereafter, female politicians were not permitted to speak on Te Tii marae until 2014.

In 2013, Te Tii marae's board nominated a different woman to escort prime minister John Key, suggesting that Harawira had "had her turn". In an apparent compromise, however, both women assisted Key onto the marae.

=== Later work and activism ===
Harawira was on the New Zealand Māori Council for 45 years, and was a talkback host on Radio Waatea. When the Māori Party was formed in 2004 she considered standing as a candidate for the Te Tai Tokerau electorate, but her son Hone Harawira stood instead. Earlier that year she participated in the hikoi protesting against controversial foreshore and seabed legislation.

In March 2007, together with other senior members of the Ngāpuhi iwi, she commissioned a report into the claims by Ngāpuhi at the Waitangi Tribunal, intended to stand alongside any decision by the Waitangi Tribunal. The report was published in 2012 and found that Ngāpuhi did not sign away its sovereignty and governance to the Crown. She was active in supporting Ngāpuhi's claims at the tribunal throughout its progress, and in January 2023 (shortly before her death) had worked to organise a meeting to discuss a recent tribunal report.

== Criticism ==
Harawira was a polarising figure who was criticised by some political leaders and even sometimes by her own iwi for her style of activism. In 2011, co-leader of the Māori Party, Pita Sharples, said Harawira had turned up to a Māori Party meeting and had yelled and sung over the top of people speaking. Harawira was reported to have called Sharples' co-leader Tariana Turia a "snake" and a "bloody liar". Following the incident, the board of the Te Tii marae considered banning her from the marae for her behaviour, and a Ngāpuhi elder called her "a bully"; in response, she labelled him a "wimp", who "needs to grow a backbone".

News website Stuff suggested that prime minister John Key had "targeted" Harawira's style of activism in his annual speech on Waitangi Day in 2013, by referring to "headline-seekers" who distract from the real issues facing Māori. In response, Harawira noted the results from Māori activism in the 1970s, and said Māori "get benefits as a Treaty partner because we fight for them". She also observed that she had earned the respect of her own people, if not the Government, by "not compromising".

== Death and legacy ==
Harawira died on 25 January 2023, at age 90. The new prime minister Chris Hipkins, who had succeeded Jacinda Ardern in the office that day, paid tribute to Harawira during one of his first public addresses as prime minister:

I do want to acknowledge her passing, and I do want to send my condolences and my aroha [love] to her whānau [family]... There will be a lot of Kiwis who didn't agree with Titewhai Harawira, but no one could doubt her passion and her sincerity and her commitment to Māori.

Hipkins also delivered a reflection written by Ardern:

Each year as I arrived [at Te Tii marae] I hoped that what I had done for the past 12 months was good enough, because I knew if she didn't think so, I would soon be told.

Minister for Māori Development Willie Jackson also paid tribute, praising Harawira's commitment to change, as well as saying that she signified "the essence of the Māori renaissance period" and the period where activists began to promote the Māori language and the promises of the Treaty of Waitangi.
