= Rehutai Maihi =

New Zealand journalist (1895–1967)

- Maihi, c. 1930
- Born: 16 September 1895; Whakapara, New Zealand
- Died: 12 August 1967 (aged 71); Kawakawa, New Zealand
- Occupations: Journalist; newspaper publisher and editor; political candidate; community leader
- Known for: Leadership and journalism within Ngāpuhi iwi
- Spouse: Stanley Gilberd (m. 1933)
- Children: 1
- Writing career
- Pen name: Nellie Nathan
- Notable works: Founder and editor of Aotearoa newspaper

Rehutai Maihi (16 September 1895 – 12 August 1967) was a New Zealand journalist, newspaper publisher and editor, political candidate and Ngāpuhi leader. As a journalist she first wrote under the penname Nellie Nathan for various Northland newspapers; she subsequently established te reo Māori language newspaper Aotearoa, which ran from around 1932 to 1945.

== Life and career ==
Maihi was born in Whakapara, Northland, New Zealand on 16 September 1895. She identified with the Ngāpuhi iwi and was a descendent of Ngāpuhi leader Patuone. Her father, bushman Nētana (Nathan) Maihi, died when she was young. She was raised Anglican and attended the Queen Victoria School for Māori Girls.

After initially training as a newspaper printing compositor, Maihi became a journalist, writing for the Northlander, the Kawakawa Luminary and the Northland Age under the penname Nellie (or Nell) Nathan. On several occasions, she was the acting editor of the Northlander while editor Allen Bell was in Parliament.

In June 1932, Maihi began publishing her own weekly Māori language newspaper, Aotearoa. She initially used the offices and printing services of a local Whāngārei newspaper, and served as editor and publisher under the names Rehutai Nētana and Nell Rehutai Nathan. By December of that year, she had moved printing to Whakapara. On 13 November 1933, she married Stanley Gilberd at Ruawai. They had one daughter together.

In 1935, Maihi stood unsuccessfully as an independent candidate for the Northern Māori electorate. She was the first Māori woman candidate for Parliament. She considered herself aligned with the policies of the New Zealand Labour Party relating to Māori, supporting improved conditions for Māori women and children and the establishment of technical schools for young Māori people.

Maihi's candidacy was criticised by some older Māori people who did not support women entering politics. In response to one critic at a public meeting, Maihi noted that a woman, Queen Victoria, had made the Treaty of Waitangi possible, and said:

Look back to our ancestors. Their cherished creed was "A woman and land: for these two things a man will die."

In 1940, while living in Kaikohe, Maihi restarted Aotearoa, which had temporarily ceased publication, and reported on the Second World War and local events. It was published on a fortnightly and then monthly basis until 1945.

She spent the last years of her life at Kaikohe where she was a member of the Māori Women's Institute and the Māori Women's Welfare League. She died on 12 August 1967 at the Bay of Islands Hospital in Kawakawa.
