= Frederick Edward Maning =

New Zealand writer (1812–1883)

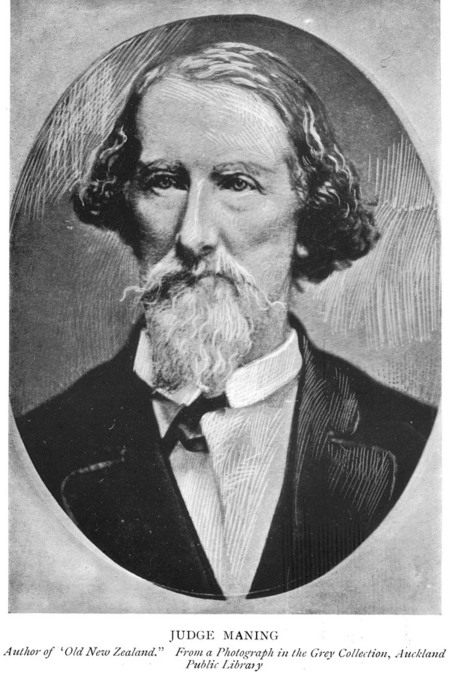
Maning in c. 1865

Frederick Edward Maning (5 July 1812 – 25 July 1883) was an early settler in New Zealand, a writer, and a judge of the Native Land Court. He published two books under the pseudonym of "a Pakeha Maori."

== Early life ==
Maning was born in Johnville, County Dublin, Ireland, the eldest son of moderately wealthy, Protestant Anglo-Irish parents. His father, Frederick Maning, emigrated to Van Diemen's Land in 1824 with his wife and three sons to take up farming. Young Maning became a skilled outdoorsman, and built up the physical strength to match his six-foot, three-inch stature. In 1829, his father became a customs officer in Hobart and moved there with his family. It is quite likely that Maning participated in the infamous Black Line and at least witnessed aspects of the Black War. He reportedly did not speak of this period much in his later life. It is possible that these incidents may have contributed to his decision to leave Hobart. By 1832, Frederick had left home to manage a remote outpost in the north of Tasmania. Soon after, Frederick decided to pursue his fortune in New Zealand.

== New Zealand ==
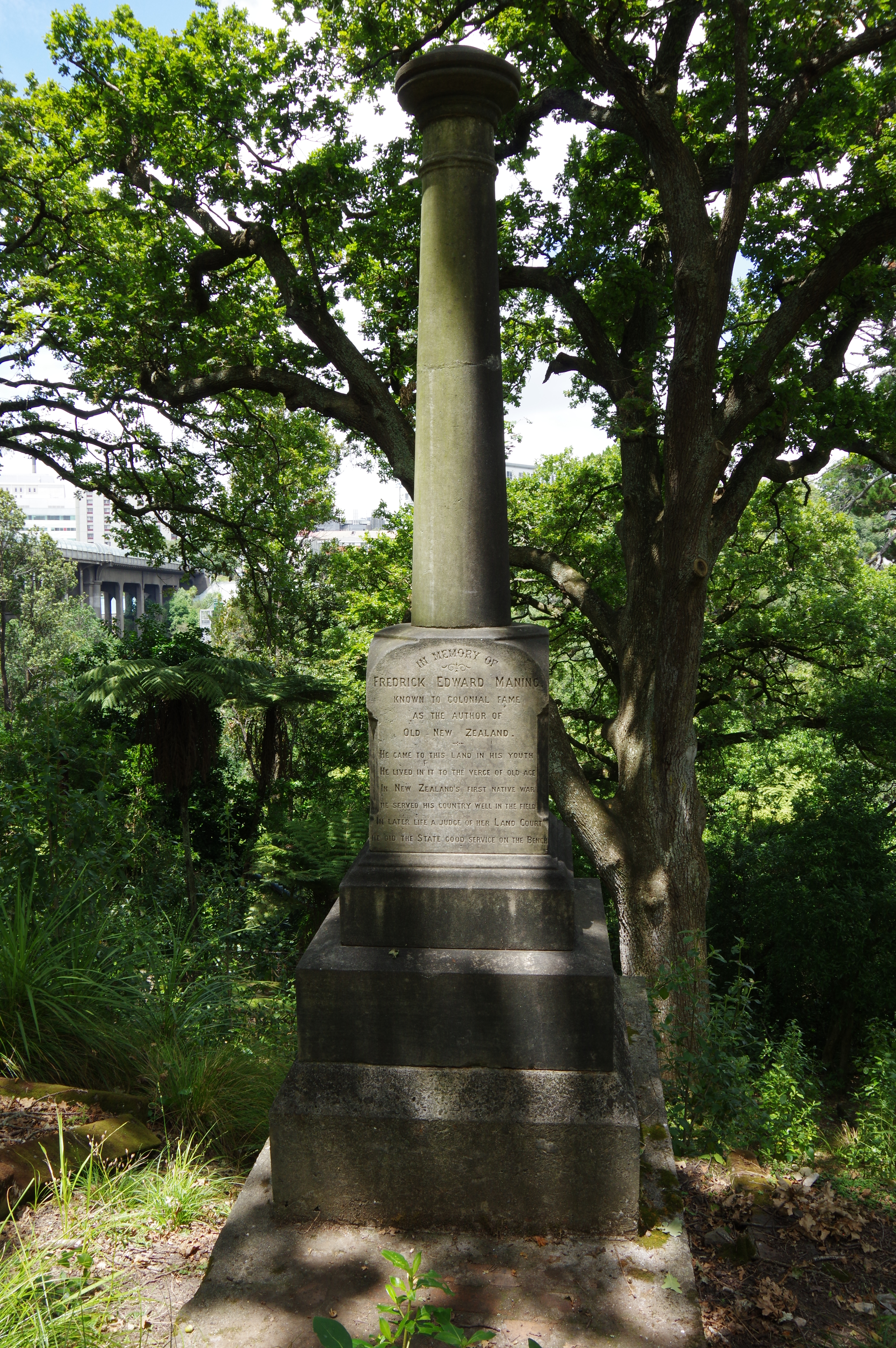
Frederick Edward Maning's grave in Symonds Street Cemetery, Auckland (front view)

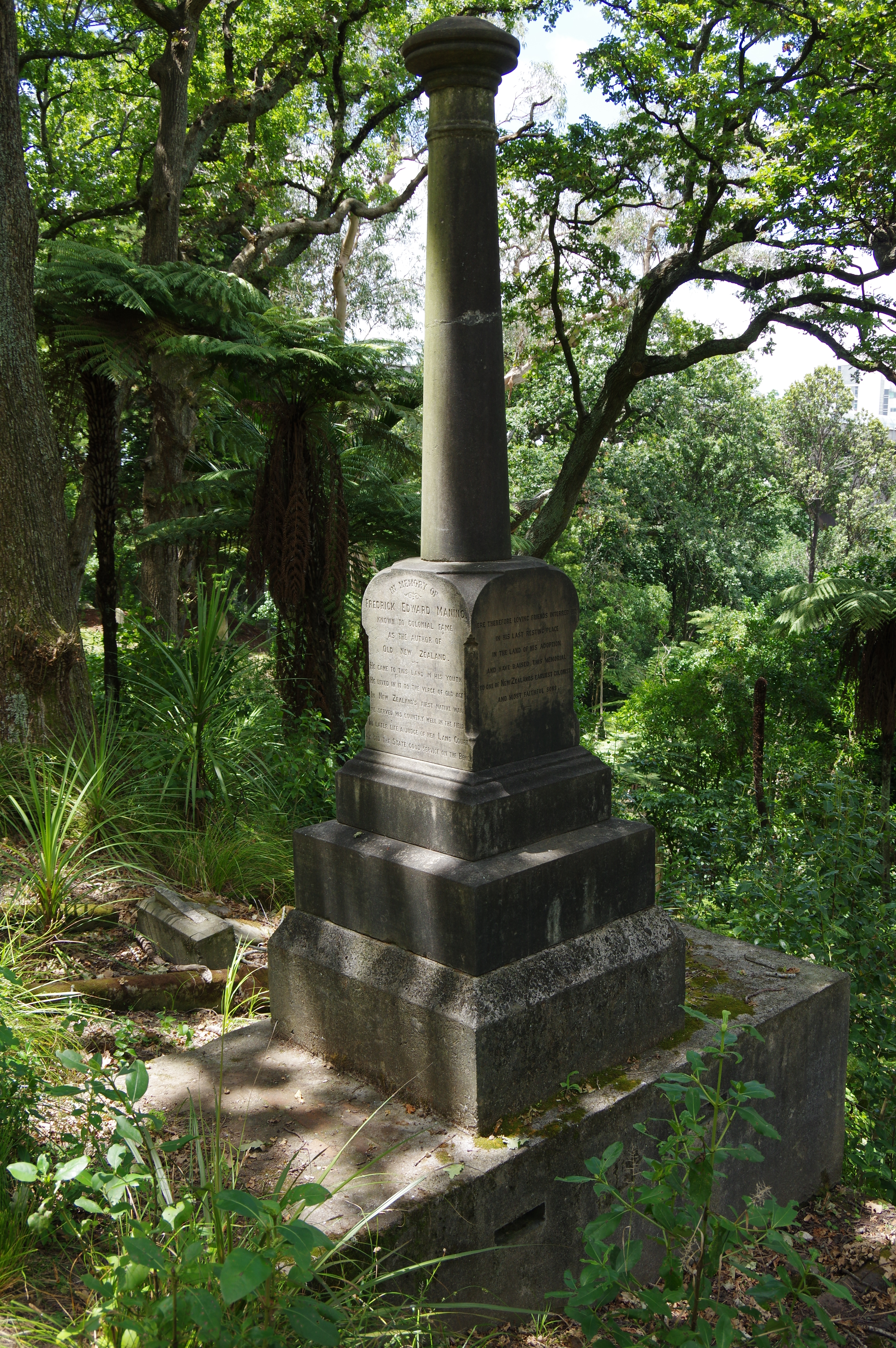
Frederick Edward Maning's grave in Symonds Street Cemetery, Auckland (side view)

Maning arrived in the Hokianga area at age 22, on 30 June 1833, and lived among the Ngāpuhi Māori. With Maning's physical skills and great stature, as well as his considerable good humour, he quickly gained favour with the tribe. He became known as a Pākehā Māori (a European turned native) and his arrival in New Zealand is the subject of the first chapters of his book Old New Zealand.

In 1837, he sold his property and returned to Hobart. He returned to Hokianga in March 1839 and in September purchased 200 acres (0.8 km^{2}) for a farm at Ōnoke, at the mouth of the Whirinaki River. He built a house there that was standing until it was destroyed by fire in 2004. He took a Māori wife, Moengaroa, of Te Hikutu hapū of Ngāpuhi, and they had four children, Susan, Maria Amina, Hauraki Hereward and Mary.

In 1840, Maning acted as a translator at meetings about the Treaty of Waitangi, and he advised the local Māori to not sign. His vocal opposition to the Treaty was primarily because he had settled with the Māori precisely to escape from the restrictions of European civilisation. He feared that the introduction of European style law would put a damper on his lifestyle and on his entrepreneurial trading activities. He warned the Māori that European colonisation would degrade them. Governor William Hobson countered by telling the Māori that without British Law, lawless self-interested Europeans without any regard for Māori rights would soon take all their land. Maning's book Old New Zealand is, in part, a lament for the lost freedom enjoyed before European rule. In 1845–1846, during the New Zealand Wars, he sometimes used his influence with the Māori to intercede on behalf of settlers. He also organised supplies to the government's Māori supporters. However, he wrote his second book, A history of the war in the north of New Zealand against the chief Heke from the perspective of an imaginary supporter of Hōne Heke, who was one of the principal antagonists opposing the government. Maning may even have actually fought with Hone Heke against one of Tāmati Wāka Nene's allies, the Hokianga chief, Makoare Te Taonui in the Battle of Te Ahu Ahu. But this seems unlikely as he was known to have sided with the government and Waka Nene by the end of the war.

Through the 1850s, Maning primarily occupied himself with timber and gum trade. In the early 1860s, he retired from business activities. In 1865, he entered the public service as a judge of the Native Land Court, where his unequalled knowledge of the Māori language, customs, traditions, and prejudices was useful.

== Later life ==
Maning retired in 1876 although he helped conduct a major land court hearing at Taupō in 1881. He became estranged from his children in his later years. In November 1882, he went to London for an operation; however, he died there on Wednesday 25 July 1883 of cancer. At his wish, his body was taken back to New Zealand and buried in December 1883, in the Symonds Street Cemetery in Auckland.

Maning is chiefly remembered as the author of two short books, Old New Zealand and History of the War in the North of New Zealand against the Chief Heke. Both books have been reprinted many times and have become classics of New Zealand literature.

== See also ==
- New Zealand literature

== Sources ==
- Bentley, Trevor (1999). Pakeha Maori: The extraordinary story of the Europeans who lived as Maori in early New Zealand. ISBN 0-14-028540-7 pp. 132–33.
- Maning, Frederick Edward in Dictionary of New Zealand Biography
- Maning, Frederick Edward in Encyclopædia Britannica, 11th ed.
- Frederick Edward Maning in New Zealand Electronic Text Collection
- Steer, Philip (2004). Introduction to 'Old New Zealand' full text.
- PDF copy of Maning's two books at archive.org
- Old New Zealand: Being Incidents of Native Customs and Character in the Old Times by 'A Pakeha Maori' (Frederick Edward Maning). Gutenberg ebook, originally published 1863
- Old New Zealand: Being Incidents of Native Customs and Character in the Old Times by A Pakeha Maori full text, New Zealand Electronic Text Collection
