= Moetara =

Moetara, later also known as Moetara Motu Tongaporutu (died 23 December 1838), was a tribal leader, agriculturalist and trader of the Ngāti Korokoro subtribe of the Ngāpuhi Māori iwi that lived on the south side of the Hokianga, New Zealand.

When Moetara was a young man, his uncle Mauwhena (or Mauhena) was the chief of Ngāti Korokoro. In 1819, Moetara had a leadership position under Patuone, Nene and Tuwhare in a fighting expedition of northern tribes that travelled down the west coast of the North Island as far as Wellington. During the expedition two of Moetara's cousins died in Taranaki and it may have been because of this that he took the additional name Motu Tongaporutu, the name of a pā in Taranaki.

When European ships started coming to the Hokianga for timber in the 1820s, Ngāti Korokoro under Mauwhena were well placed to profit from supplying them with food. One visiting captain, John Rodolphus Kent, married Moetara's sister, Wharo. Moetara continued to take part in war expeditions in the mid 1820s. By 1827, Moetara was the chief at Pakanae, near Opononi. His cousin Kahi, leader of Te Hikutu, also lived there with about 100 of his subtribe.

On 20 March 1834, Moetara participated in a meeting at Waitangi in the Bay of Islands to select a flag for New Zealand. In October 1835, he signed the Declaration of the Independence of New Zealand. Moetara died on 23 December 1838. He was succeeded as chief of Ngāti Korokoro by his brother Rangatira, who took the name Rangatira Moetara, and signed the Treaty of Waitangi as such in 1840.
