= Katerina Nēhua =

New Zealand endurance swimmer (1903–1948)

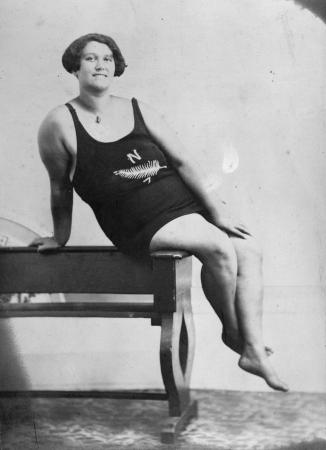
- Nēhua in the 1930s
- Born: Katerina Waetford; 6 February 1903; Whakapara, New Zealand
- Died: 15 June 1948 (aged 45); Sydney, Australia
- Other names: Katherine Darley
- Occupation: Endurance swimmer
- Spouse: Joseph Darley (m. 1923, died)
- Children: 5

Katerina Nēhua (6 February 1903 – 15 June 1948) was a New Zealand endurance swimmer, who competed in a number of swimming competitions in Australia in the 1930s and held the world record for staying afloat in water. Born Katerina Waetford, she used her mother's maiden name professionally, and in her personal life, she was known as Katherine Darley.

== Biography ==
Nēhua was born on 6 February 1903 at Whakapara. She belonged to the iwi (tribe) of Ngāpuhi and was a descendant of the chief Eru Patuone. On 11 April 1923 she married a local English farmer, Joseph Darley, who was working as a miner. The family moved to Sydney in 1927. After Darley was made redundant from his job as a mechanic, they found themselves in difficult financial circumstances.

In January 1931, Nēhua entered an endurance swimming competition (with the goal of staying afloat in water the longest) in Manly using her mother's maiden name. She had previously competed in a similar contest in the Bay of Islands and had managed to stay afloat for 25 hours. Nēhua and her husband said they spent their only remaining funds on the tram ride to the contest, and Nēhua had given birth to her youngest daughter only nine weeks previously. Other contestants included well-known swimmers Lily Copplestone (from New Zealand) and Mercedes Gleitze, who had recently set a record of 43 hours staying afloat in water.

Nēhua was the runner-up, leaving the water after 47 hours 52½ minutes afloat. She received £100 prize money, plus an additional £100 from Gleitze, who stayed in the water 22½ minutes longer and who was impressed by Nēhua's efforts. Both women were taken home by ambulance.

Nēhua subsequently set a world record for this kind of endurance swimming in March 1931 at the baths in Balmoral, where she stayed in the water for 72 hours and 9 minutes. She was reported as saying on the occasion that she would make her next attempt in an enclosed swimming pool with warm water. She broke her own record in May 1931 at the municipal baths in Brisbane, managing 72 hours 21 minutes. In total she entered around 12 of these endurance competitions, and became a well-known local personality for her efforts. Her last known contest was in March 1932, when she managed 60 hours, again at the Balmoral baths; she reportedly had to leave the water due to the intense cold.

Nēhua was able to earn money to support her family and said that she was "proud to be able to uphold [her] Māori race in this class of sport". On setting her March 1931 world record, she was invited to speak on a Sydney radio station, and said:

Some folk think that endurance swimming is quite a simple thing to do, when really it is not, for a person requires courage and plenty of it, to stay in the water overnight. Therefore my advice to young people who might like to try endurance swimming is don't.

Nēhua was an active member of Sydney's Polynesian Club and, together with her five daughters, took part in Waitangi Day celebrations in Sydney in 1940. She died of a heart attack on 15 June 1948, survived by her daughters (her husband having pre-deceased her).
