= Ōnoke =

Locality in New Zealand

- Interactive map of Ōnoke
- Country: New Zealand
- Region: Northland Region
- Territorial authority: Far North District
- Ward: Kaikohe-Hokianga general ward; Ngā Tai o Tokerau Māori ward
- Electorates: Northland; Te Tai Tokerau (Māori)

Government
  - Territorial authority: Far North District Council
  - Regional council: Northland Regional Council
  - Mayor of Far North: Moko Tepania
  - Northland MP: Grant McCallum
  - Te Tai Tokerau MP: Mariameno Kapa-Kingi

Area
  - Total: 11.09 km^{2} (4.28 sq mi)

Population (2023 census)
  - Total: 90
  - Density: 8.1/km^{2} (21/sq mi)

Ōnoke is a locality in the Hokianga region. Located at the mouth of the Whirinaki River, it was the site of Frederick Maning's house.

Ōnoke locality covers 11.09 km^{2} (4.28 sq mi) and had a population of 90 in the 2023 New Zealand census.

== Toponymy ==
There have been different claims regarding the significance of the name Ōnoke. Edward Dollimore provided the literal meaning, "place of earthworms," based on the toponymy of Lake Ōnoke in the Wairarapa. In 1870, a reporter from The Daily Southern Cross claimed that either Ōnoke was named after specific stones found there or that the stones were named after the locality.

== Geography ==
An article from The New Zealand Herald from 1892 noted that Ōnoke is located on an alluvial plain and is sheltered from prevailing winds. Similarly, an article from The Daily Southern Cross stated that Ōnoke is sheltered due to the hills the surround it.

== History ==
The New Zealand Geographic Board claims that Ōnoke was a good place to cross the Hokianga Harbour to Te Karaka, whilst also serving as a stop-over point for those travelling across the harbour. Early charts from James Herd show Ōnoke as "Moodewy's Point," a reference to the rangatira Muriwai, whose mana Herd was particularly impressed with.

In March 1839, New Zealand writer Frederick Maning settled at Ōnoke. He later bought the land in September of the same year, which was around 81 hectares in area, with the deed being dated 3 September. The deed was signed by fifteen Māori chiefs, who inscribed X's and scrolls from tattoo marks on the document. In return, Maning provided goods that totaled around £100 in value, which included 220 pounds of tobacco and 15 pairs of blankets. Maning built a house there, which had a foundation made up of round stones that were exclusive to Ōnoke and required "considerable labour" to be transported. Many of Maning's anecdotes in his book, Old New Zealand, were based on experiences in his early years in Ōnoke.

Maning later built a courthouse in Ōnoke, where it was believed that the first Native Land Court hearing was held, with Maning acting as the administrator. Maning served as a judge of the court from 1865 to 1877, sometimes sitting at his property in Ōnoke. The site was rated a Category 1 listed Historic Place until it was destroyed in a fire in 2004.

According to Māori legend, there was a pool of water nearby to Ōnoke that was haunted by a taniwha. Maning, although dismissing the story as an old wives' tale, attempted to rid the pool of the taniwha via an explosion. Whilst the explosion sent water and mud into the air and, ultimately, emptied the pool, the local Māori, who considered the pool tapu, were horrified and never completely forgave Maning.

In 1859, Maning was awarded 40 hectares of land at Ōnoke by the Old Land Claims Commissioners. In 1868, a dispute over land at Whirinaki led to Ngāpuhi building two pā at Ōnoke; one on the beach and one on the hill near Maning's house. Te Rarawa, a different iwi, built two wooden pā at Te Karaka. The dispute was successfully mediated by the Civil Commissioner James Mackay, alongside eight influential chiefs. In 1870, the Governor of New Zealand George Bowen visited Ōnoke, where Maning hosted a ball. A visiting reporter from The Daily Southern Cross recorded that, at the time of the visit, Ōnoke only had a small garden plot, a few planted trees, and Maning's residence with a fence surrounding it.

In 1880, Maning sold his estate at Onoke; according to the Auckland Star, he had been trying to sell it to "southern buyers" for a long time.

Around 1891, the land was purchased by a man known as Colonel Noakes. Under Noakes, Maning's former house underwent renovations, being "loopholed and fortified," in order to defend it in case tensions arose with local Māori. Noakes also managed sheep on the property, tending to 500 sheep of mixed breed.
