= John Rodolphus Kent =

John Rodolphus Kent (died 1 January 1837), also known as Amukete, was a Royal Navy officer and trader who settled in New Zealand in 1827. He first started sailing to New Zealand from Port Jackson (Sydney) in New South Wales in 1820. He settled at Koutu Point near Opononi in the Hokianga in 1827 under the protection of the Ngāti Korokoro chief Moetara. He then moved to Kawhia in 1828 to trade with the Waikato tribes. There he met Te Wherowhero, the paramount chief of Waikato, and married his daughter Tiria. He died at Kahawai on the Manukau Harbour on 1 January 1837.

== See also ==
- Elizabeth Henrietta (1816 ship)
