= James Herd =

Scottish ship captain and seaman

James Herd (fl.1822–1830) was a Scottish ship captain and seaman. He was notable for the early mapping of New Zealand.

== Biography ==
Herd was first in New Zealand in 1822, whilst commanding the ship Providence. He traded spars with the local Māori people in Hokianga, with missionary Thomas Kendall acting as an interpreter. One of these interactions was with the rangatira Muriwai, whose mana Herd was particularly impressed with. Herd's early charts display Motukaraka Island as "Moodewy's place" and Ōnoke as "Moodewy's Point." He returned to London with a cargo of logs from Hokianga.

In 1825, he was in command of the ship Rosanna, owned by the New Zealand Company. It was carrying 60 settlers. The ship sailed from Leith and arrived in Pegasus Harbour, Stewart Island, on 5 March 1826. Herd was tasked with land surveying, exploring trade prospects and identifying sites for potential settlement. In that same year, he mapped the entrance of Otago Harbour. He also sailed into Wellington Harbour, where he reportedly gave it its first European name, calling it Port Nicholson after John Nicholson, the harbourmaster of Sydney. In late 1826, the group of settlers arrived in the Hauraki Gulf, where, on 23 September, they attempted to buy four islands in the "district of Tāmaki," including Waiheke and Pakihi. He supposedly left the region due to the unfriendliness of the local Māori people, setting sail towards Hokianga. He was present in the Bay of Islands on 26 October 1826 when he complained of hostility by the missionaries in the area, who, according to Herd, were afraid of colonisation damaging their influence with the Māori. Herd later purchased a block of land for settlement at Herd's Point, Hokianga.
