= Providence (1812 ship) =

Merchant ship launched at Lynn in 1812

History

United Kingdom
- Name: Providence
- Builder: Bottomly & Co., King's Lynn
- Launched: 1812
- Fate: Wrecked January 1828

General characteristics
- Tons burthen: 380 (bm)
- Propulsion: Sail

Providence was a merchant ship launched at Lynn in 1812. She sailed to Bengal and also made two voyages transporting convicts to Australia. She was wrecked in 1828 homeward bound from St Petersburg, Russia.

== Career ==
Providence enters Lloyd's Register in 1813 with master W. Green and voyage Lynn to London. In 1820, under the command of Captain Moon, Providence sailed to Bengal.

Under the command of James Herd, Providence left England on 13 June 1821. Sailing via Porto Praya and Rio de Janeiro, she arrived at Hobart on 18 December 1821. She had left with England 103 female convicts and disembarked 53 at Hobart. She then sailed to Port Jackson arriving on 7 January 1822. The 50 remaining female convicts disembarked at Sydney. Providence left Port Jackson and sailed to the Bay of Islands, New Zealand on a trading voyage, before sailing to Hokianga for Kauri spars that were traded for with muskets. In August 1822, Providence returned to the Bay of Islands before sailing to Valparaiso in South America.

On her second voyage, under the command of John Wauchope, Providence departed the Downs, Thames River, on 24 December 1825 and arrived at Hobart Town, Van Diemen's Land on 16 May 1826 after sailing via Tenerife. She embarked 100 female convicts, of whom one died on the voyage. Providence was at Sydney by 23 June and at Bengal on 1 December. From there she sailed to England, where she arrived 16 April 1827.

== Loss ==
Providence, Warburton, master, was wrecked at Helsingør, Denmark, on 5 January 1828. She was on a voyage from Saint Petersburg, Russia to Hull, Yorkshire. Warburton and two men drowned.
