= Waimamaku River =

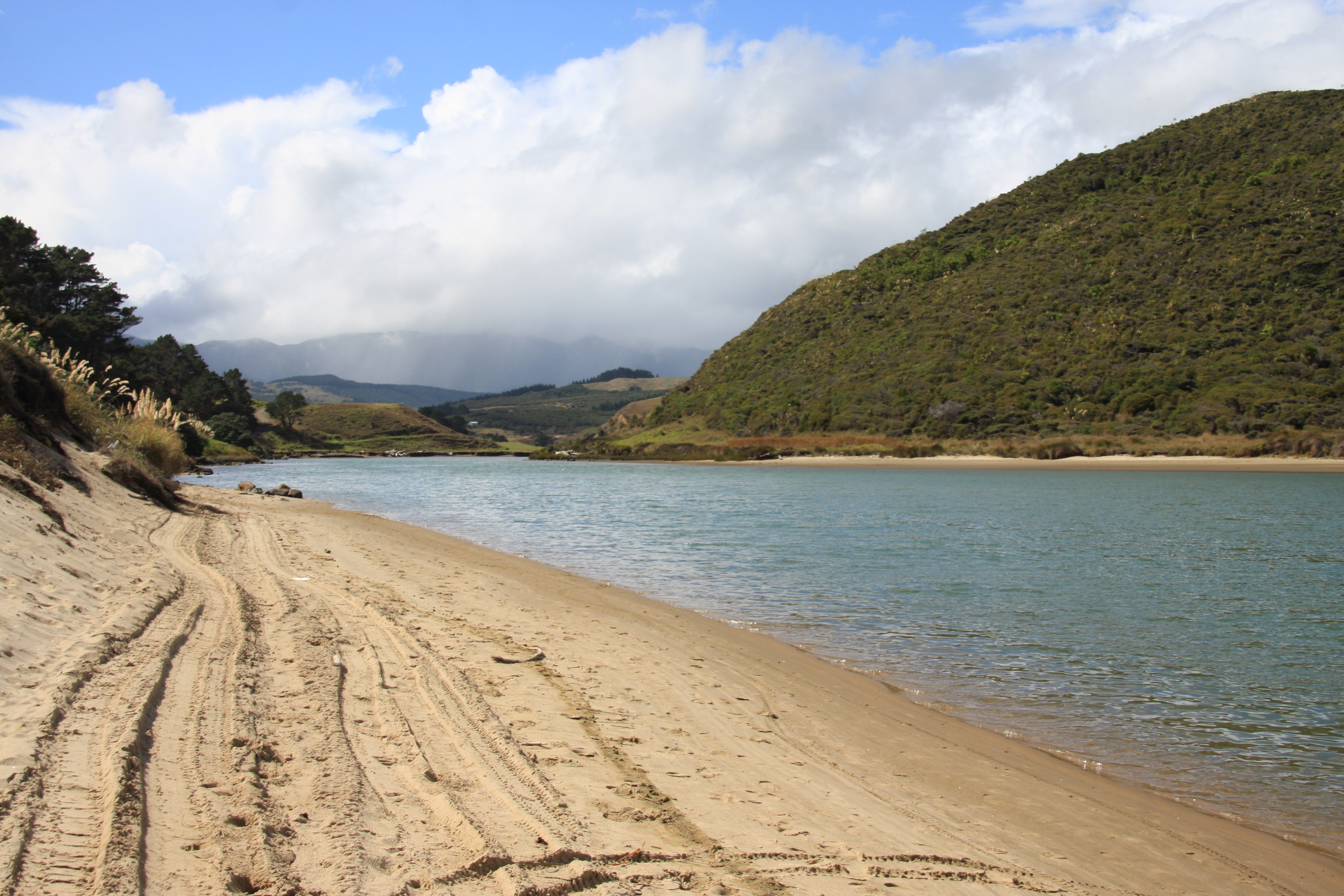
- The Waimamaku River in April 2010, looking inland near its mouth.

Location
- Country: New Zealand

Physical characteristics
- Source
  - location: Mataraua Forest
- Mouth
  - location: Tasman Sea
- Length: 26 km (16 mi)

The Waimamaku River is a river in the Northland Region of New Zealand's North Island. It has a catchment of 133 square kilometres. Its name is Māori for "water of mamaku fern".

The river's upper catchment contains native forests: it rises in the Mataraua Forest and flows in a generally westerly direction, north of the Waipoua Forest. The lower catchment is largely pastoral, with the river passing through Waimamaku township before reaching the Tasman Sea eight kilometres south of the mouth of the Hokianga Harbour. A sampling site between Waimamaku and the sea monitors water quality.

== See also ==
- List of rivers of New Zealand
