= Whirinaki, Northland =

Whirinaki
- Coordinates: 35°28′26″S 173°27′45″E
- Country: New Zealand
- Region: Northland Region
- District: Far North District

Population (c.2005)
  - Total: 200

Whirinaki is a locality on the Whirinaki River in the south Hokianga, in Northland, New Zealand. The name means "to lean against a support". Highway 12 runs through it. Opononi lies to the south west, and Rawene lies to the north east.

It is part of the Hokianga South statistical area, which covers the southern side of Hokianga Harbour between Rawene and Koutu. For demographics of this area, see Rawene.

== History and culture ==
Whirinaki was raided by Te Roroa in 1810 or 1811, during the Musket Wars. All the inhabitants of Opara village were killed.

The area has three marae associated with Ngāpuhi hapū:

- Mātai Aranui Marae are affiliated with Ngāti Kairewa, Ngāti Kerewheti, Ngāti Te Pou, Te Hikutu and Te Whānau Whero.
- Mōria Marae are affiliated with Ngāti Kairewa, Ngāti Kerewheti, Ngāti Te Pou, Ngāti Tuapango, Te Hikutu and Te Whānau Whero.
- Pā te Aroha Marae are affiliated with Ngāti Kairewa, Ngāti Kerewheti, Ngāti Te Pou, Ngāti Tuapango, Te Hikutu and Te Whānau Whero.

== Education ==
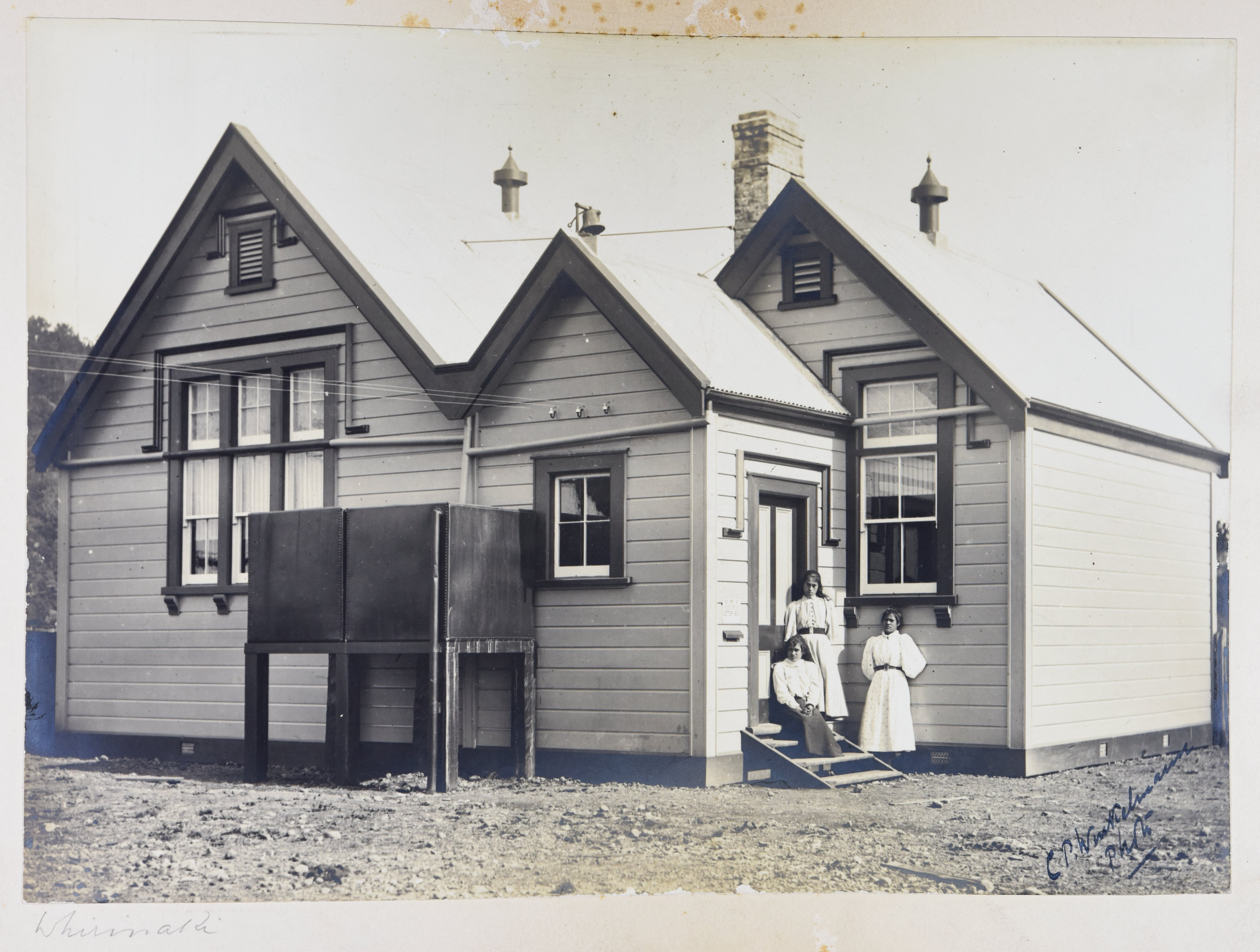
Whirinaki Native School, sometime between 1900 and 1936

Te Kura Kaupapa Māori o Te Tonga o Hokianga is a coeducational full primary (years 1–8) school which has a roll of 142. It is a Kura Kaupapa Māori school which teaches fully in the Māori language.

There was a Whirinaki Native School during the early-mid 20th century.
