= Ngātokimatawhaorua =

- Great Māori migration waka
- Iwi: Ngā Puhi

In Māori tradition, Ngātokimatawhaorua (or Matawhaorua) was one of the great ocean-going, voyaging canoes that was used in the migrations that settled New Zealand.

Matawhaorua was the canoe of Kupe, the Polynesian discoverer of the islands now known as New Zealand. On Kupe's return to Hawaiki, it was re-adzed by Kupe and Nukutawhiti and renamed Ngātokimatawhaorua ("ngā toki" translating as "the adzes").

The rangatira of Ngātokimatawhaorua was Nukutawhiti. Although he predated the iwi Ngāpuhi, he is the ancestor of the great Ngāpuhi rangatira, Rāhiri.

== A Legend of Ngātokimatawhaorua ==
The departure of Ngātokimatawhaorua coincided with a nova, during which a star shone so brightly that the nights were almost as bright as day.

Nukutawhiti spoke a karakia to bring a big wave, and with the help of four Taniwha, the wave pushed the waka towards Aotearoa. The Taniwha are called Āraiteuru, Niua, Puhimoanaariki and Rangiuruhinga. The children on the waka hourua likened the strength of each Taniwha to that of 100 great white sharks.

As the waka surged along, the children onboard looked down at the heaving waters below and composed the following waiata:

Ngarunui, ngaruroa, ngarupaewhenua

Te ngaru i mauria mai ai a Ngātokimatawhaorua

Great wave, long wave, wave like a mountain range

The wave that brought hither Ngātokimatawhaorua

Upon arrival, the taniwha Āraiteuru and Niua became guardians of the entrance to the Hokianga Harbour, where they continue to appear in many forms — including rocks and waves.

It is said that Ngātokimatawhaorua was taken to a cave, and eventually turned to stone.

== Ngā Toki Matawhaorua ==
Ngā Toki Matawhaorua, a waka built in 1940 at the instigation of Te Puea Herangi for the centenary of the signing of the Treaty of Waitangi, is named after Matawhaorua.

== See also ==
- List of Māori waka
