= Parore Te Awha =

Nga Puhi and Te Roroa leader

Parore Te Awha (?–1887) was a New Zealand Māori leader. Of Māori descent, he identified with the Ngā Puhi and Te Roroa iwi. He was born in Mangakahia, Northland, New Zealand.
