= Ōmāpere =

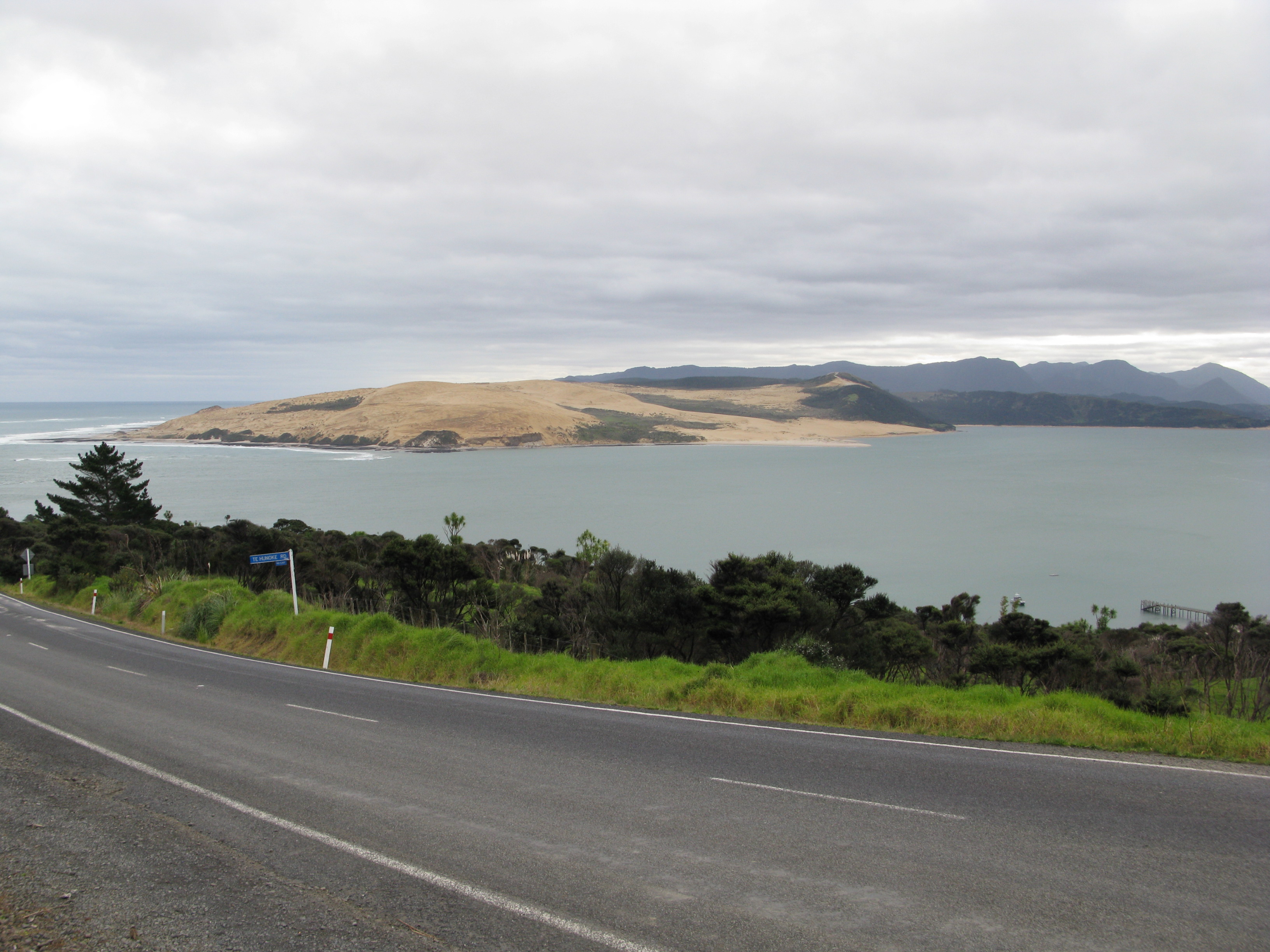
- View of the Hokianga Harbour mouth from State Highway 12 above Ōmāpere
- Interactive map of Ōmāpere
- Coordinates: 35.533°S 173.389°E
- Country: New Zealand
- Region: Northland Region
- District: Far North District
- Ward: Kaikohe/Hokianga
- Community: Kaikohe-Hokianga
- Subdivision: South Hokianga
- Electorates: Northland; Te Tai Tokerau

Government
  - Territorial Authority: Far North District Council
  - Regional council: Northland Regional Council
  - Mayor of Far North: Moko Tepania
  - Northland MP: Grant McCallum
  - Te Tai Tokerau MP: TBD

Area
  - Total: 12.91 km^{2} (4.98 sq mi)

Population (June 2025)
  - Total: 450
  - Density: 35/km^{2} (90/sq mi)

Ōmāpere is a settlement on the south shore of Hokianga Harbour in Northland, New Zealand. State Highway 12 runs through Ōmāpere. Opononi is on the shore to the north of Ōmāpere.

The New Zealand Ministry for Culture and Heritage gives a translation of "place of cutty grass" for Ōmāpere.

== History ==
=== European settlement ===
The first European settler in the Ōmāpere area was John Martin, who arrived in the Hokianga Harbour in 1827. In 1832 Martin purchased land on the flat area, along the beach at Ōmāpere. In 1838 Martin extended his land purchase to the Hokianga Harbour's South Head, where he established a signal station to guide ships crossing the challenging harbour entrance. The signal station remained in operation until 1951.

With permission from Ngāti Korokoro, the local hapū (sub-tribe), in 1838 John Whiteley established a Wesleyan mission at Pākanae on land purchased with blankets, tools and tobacco.

In 1869, a bush licence was granted to Charles Bryers at Ōmāpere. In the mid-1870s, a liquor licence was then given to the establishment called the 'Heads'. This later became the 'Travellers Rest'. By 1876 the farm of John Martin had become the township of Pakia. It was home to a hotel, two stores, several houses and a school house. The name Ōmāpere began to be used more frequently and became Ōmāpere by residents agreement in 1874. By the latter 19th century, Ōmāpere became an important location for the kauri gum digging trade.

=== Marae ===
Kōkōhuia or Ōmāpere Marae and Te Whakarongotai meeting house is affiliated with the Ngāpuhi hapū of Ngāti Korokoro, Ngāti Whārara, Te Poukā and Ngāti Te Pou. Waiwhatawhata or Aotea Marae and Te Kaiwaha meeting house is affiliated to Ngāti Korokoro and Ngāti Whārara.

== Demographics ==
Statistics New Zealand describes Ōmāpere as a rural settlement. It covers 12.91 km^{2} (4.98 sq mi) and had an estimated population of 450 as of June 2025, with a population density of 35 people per km^{2}. The settlement is part of the larger Waipoua Forest statistical area.

Historical population
| Year | Pop. | ±% p.a. |
|---|---|---|
| 2006 | 393 | — |
| 2013 | 363 | −1.13% |
| 2018 | 426 | +3.25% |
| 2023 | 447 | +0.97% |

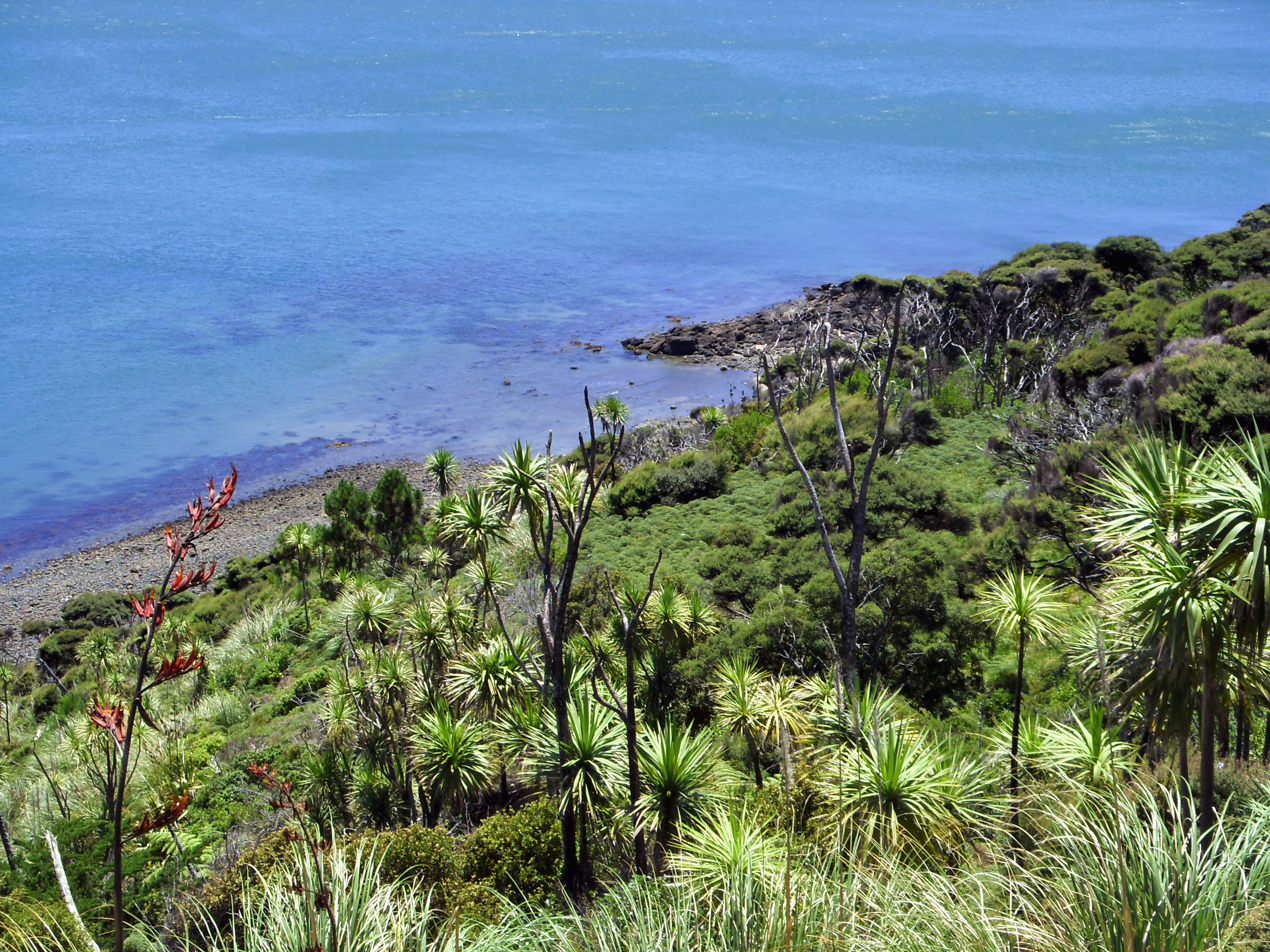
The western coast of Ōmāpere

Ōmāpere had a population of 447 in the 2023 New Zealand census, an increase of 21 people (4.9%) since the 2018 census, and an increase of 84 people (23.1%) since the 2013 census. There were 213 males and 231 females in 183 dwellings. 3.4% of people identified as LGBTIQ+. The median age was 53.6 years (compared with 38.1 years nationally). There were 72 people (16.1%) aged under 15 years, 42 (9.4%) aged 15 to 29, 192 (43.0%) aged 30 to 64, and 144 (32.2%) aged 65 or older.

People could identify as more than one ethnicity. The results were 57.7% European (Pākehā); 60.4% Māori; 3.4% Pasifika; 5.4% Asian; 0.7% Middle Eastern, Latin American and African New Zealanders (MELAA); and 2.7% other, which includes people giving their ethnicity as "New Zealander". English was spoken by 98.0%, Māori language by 28.9%, Samoan by 0.7% and other languages by 8.1%. No language could be spoken by 1.3% (e.g. too young to talk). The percentage of people born overseas was 12.8, compared with 28.8% nationally.

Religious affiliations were 43.6% Christian, 0.7% Hindu, 4.0% Māori religious beliefs, 0.7% Buddhist, and 1.3% other religions. People who answered that they had no religion were 39.6%, and 9.4% of people did not answer the census question.

Of those at least 15 years old, 57 (15.2%) people had a bachelor's or higher degree, 204 (54.4%) had a post-high school certificate or diploma, and 96 (25.6%) people exclusively held high school qualifications. The median income was $25,600, compared with $41,500 nationally. 24 people (6.4%) earned over $100,000 compared to 12.1% nationally. The employment status of those at least 15 was that 126 (33.6%) people were employed full-time, 54 (14.4%) were part-time, and 12 (3.2%) were unemployed.

== Notes ==
Media related to Omapere at Wikimedia Commons
