= Ngā Toki Matawhaorua =

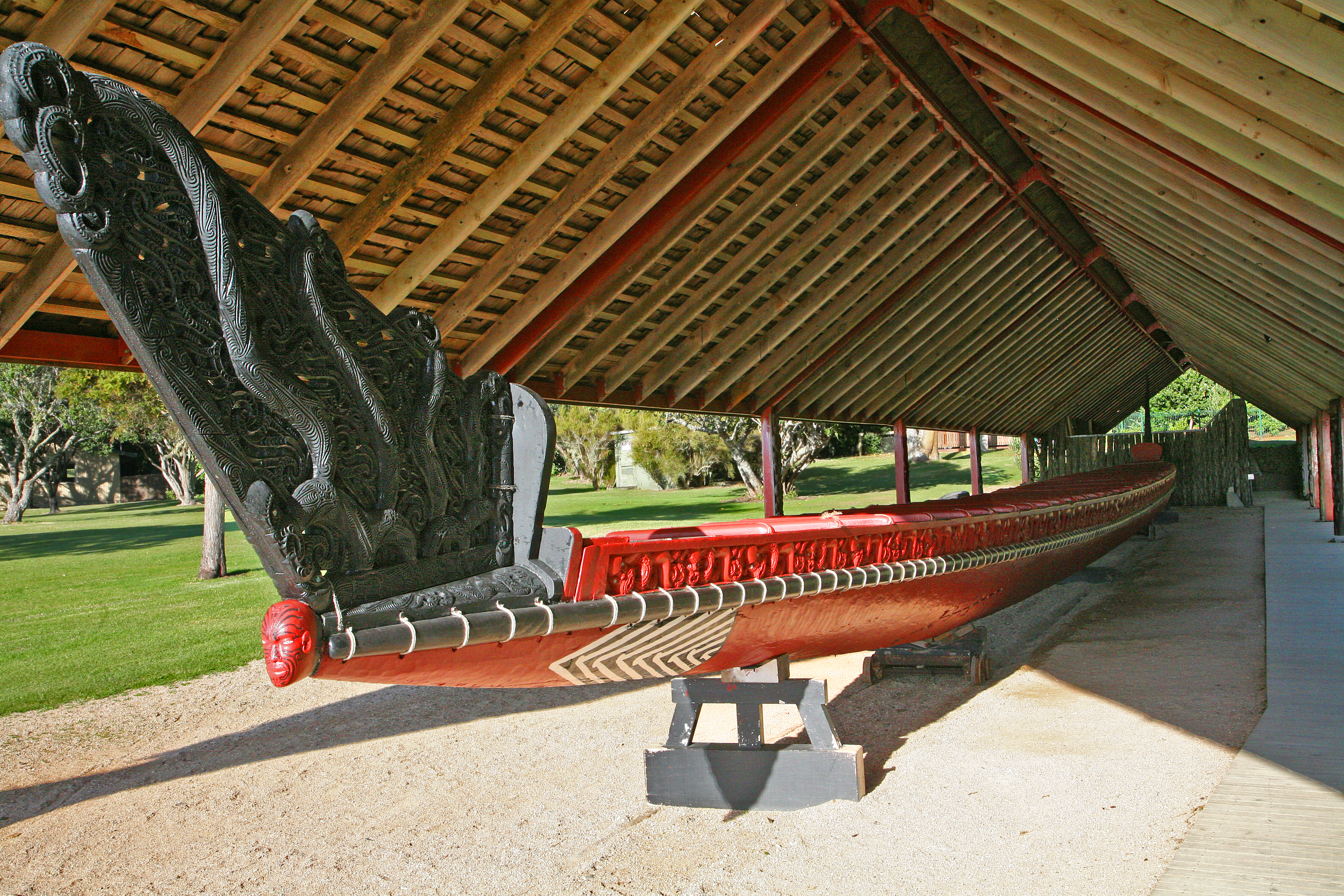
Ngā Toki in its whare waka at Waitangi

Ngā Toki Matawhaorua of Pewhairangi, often simply known as Ngā Toki, is the name of a New Zealand waka taua (large, ornately carved Māori war canoe).

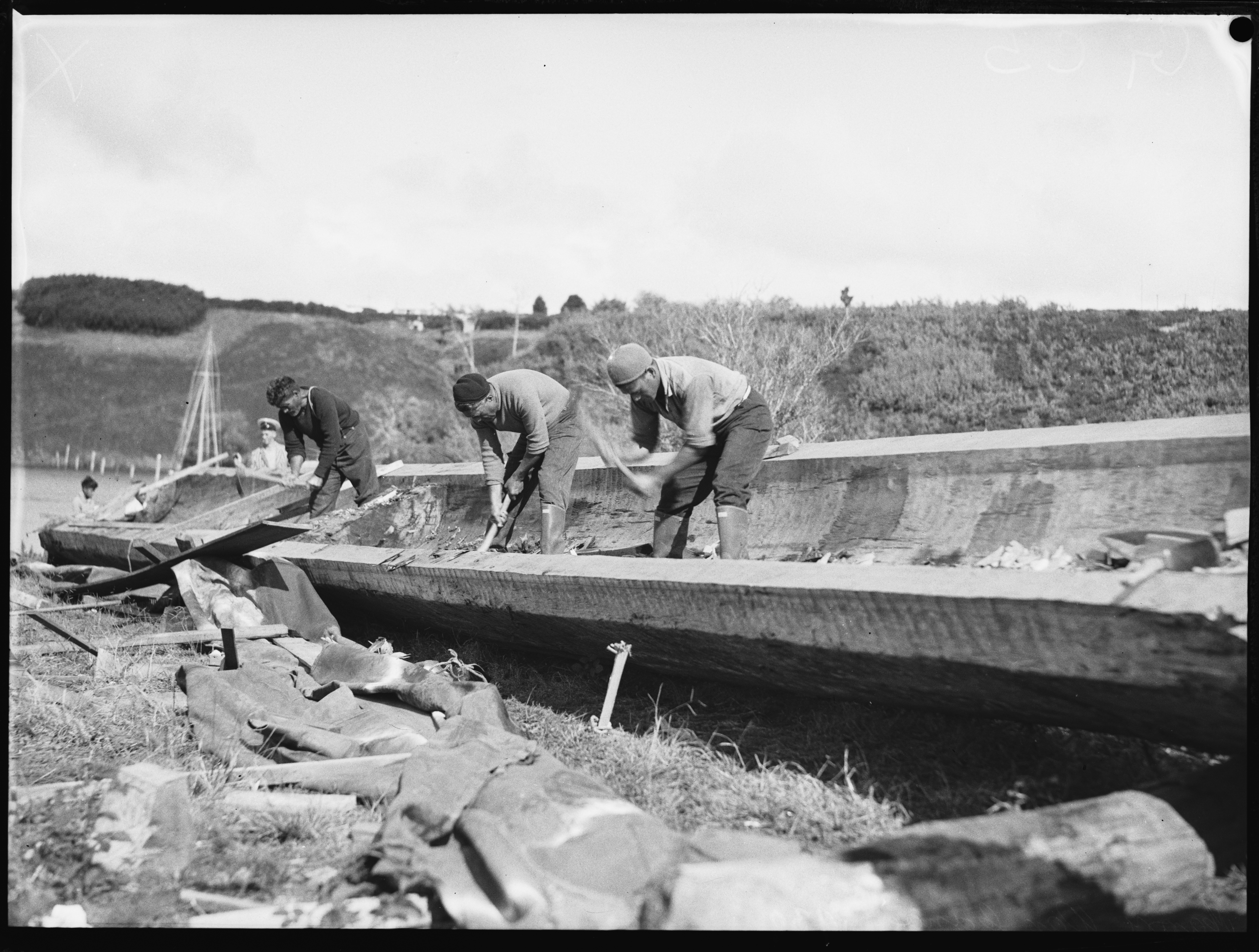
Construction of Ngā Toki Matawhaorua, a 37-metre ceremonial war canoe (waka taua), Kerikeri, Aotearoa-New Zealand, 1939

It is named after Matawhaorua, the waka hourua (double-hulled canoe) of Kupe, the Polynesian discoverer of the islands now known as New Zealand; Kupe's canoe was later re-adzed and renamed Ngātokimatawhaorua. After almost three years of construction, it was completed in 1940 at the instigation of Te Puea Hērangi for the centenary of the signing of the Treaty of Waitangi. It was refurbished by master waka builder and navigator Hekenukumai Ngā Iwi (Hector) Busby in 1974 for relaunching during the Waitangi Day ceremonies at Waitangi, Northland and has been paddled periodically since that time.

Ngā Toki can carry approximately 80 paddlers and 55 other passengers. It is the largest dugout canoe in New Zealand, measuring 35.7 metres (123 ft) long and up to 2 metres (6.56 ft) wide. It held the Guinness World Record for the world's longest canoe until July 12, 2006, when it was supplanted by a canoe built in Newport, Maine.

== See also ==
- Polynesian navigation
- Hokule'a, Hawaiian double-hulled ship and voyages.
- Chundan vallam, Kerala snake boat
