= Ngararatunua =

Coordinates: 35.673107°S 174.265275°E

Ngararatunua or Ngāraratunua is a semi-rural community on the outskirts of Whangārei, in the Northland Region of New Zealand's North Island.

The local Ngāraratunua Marae and Te Paea Soldiers' Memorial Hall is a meeting place of the Ngāpuhi hapū of Ngāti Hau, Ngāti Hine, Te Parawhau and Ngāti Kahu o Torongare.
