= Whirinaki River (Northland) =

River in Northland, New Zealand

Location
- Country: New Zealand

Physical characteristics
- Source: Ngapukehaua
  - location: Waimā Forest
  - coordinates: 35°30′32″S 173°33′04″E
  - elevation: 640 metres (2,100 ft)
- Mouth: Hokianga Harbour
  - location: Tidal estuary near Ōnoke
  - coordinates: 35°25′09″S 173°26′20″E
  - elevation: 0 metres (0 ft)
- Length: 16 km (9.9 mi)

Basin features
- Tributaries
  - left: Falls Creek, Okopako Stream, Wheoki Stream
  - right: Kāruhiruhi Stream

The Whirinaki River is a river of the Northland Region of New Zealand's North Island. It flows northwest from the Waima Forest through the settlement of Whirinaki to the Hokianga Harbour.

== See also ==
- List of rivers of New Zealand
