= Waimamaku =

Coordinates: 35.555844°S 173.476250°E

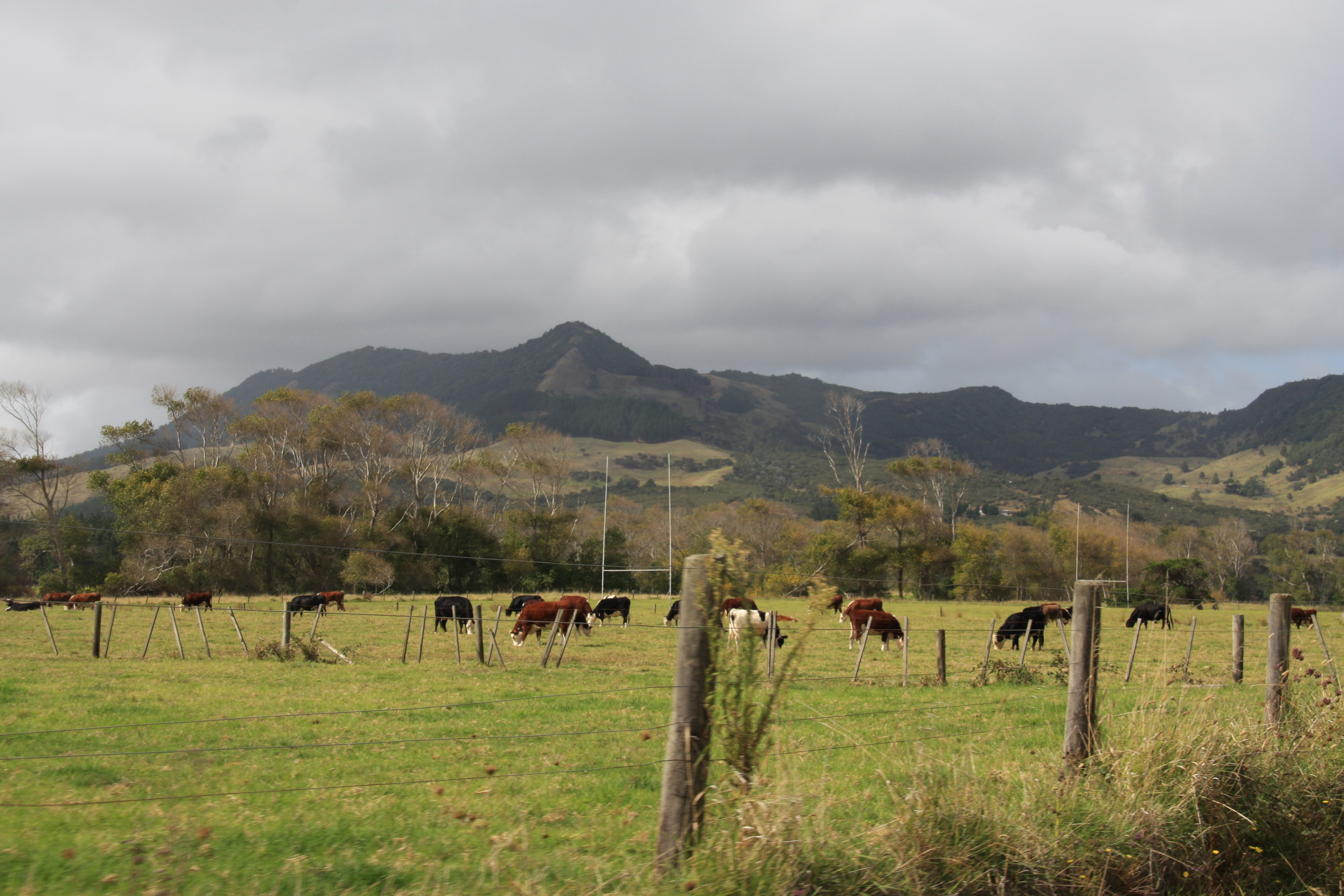
Rural landscape in Waimamaku, showing cattle grazing near rugby goalposts.

Waimamaku is a village and rural community, based along the banks of the Waimamaku River south of the Hokianga Harbour on the west coast of New Zealand's North Island. It is located in the Far North District and Northland Region on State Highway 12, south of Ōmāpere and north of Waipoua.

== Notable people ==
- Marama Russell (c. 1875 – 1952), midwife and tribal leader
