= Ngāpuhi =

Māori tribe in Aotearoa New Zealand

- Iwi (tribe) in Māoridom
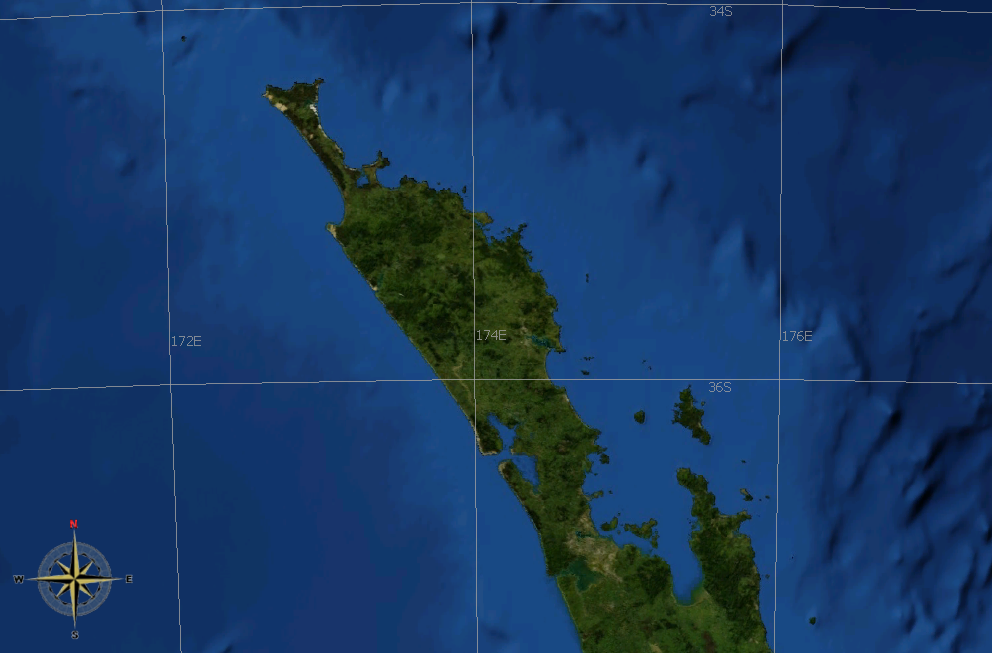
- The Northland Peninsula

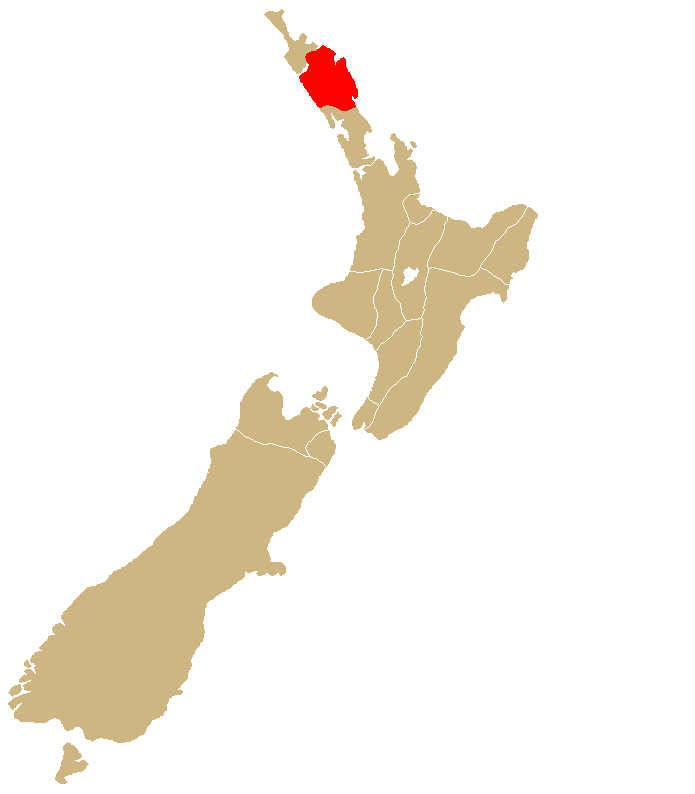
- Rohe (region): Northland
- Waka (canoe): Māmari, Ngātokimatawhaorua, Māhūhū, Ruakaramea, Tainui, Matawhaorua
- Population: 184,470
- Website: http://www.ngapuhi.iwi.nz/

Ngāpuhi (also known as Ngāpuhi-Nui-Tonu or Ngā Puhi) is a Māori iwi associated with the Northland regions of New Zealand centred in the Hokianga, the Bay of Islands, and Whangārei.

According to the 2023 New Zealand census, the estimated population of Ngāpuhi is 184,470. This compares to 125,601 in 2001, 102,981 in 2006, 122,214 in 2013. and 165,201 in 2018. It is formed from 150 hapū or subtribes, with 55 marae.

Despite such diversity, the people of Ngāpuhi maintain their shared history and self-identity. Te Rūnanga ā Iwi o Ngāpuhi, based in Kaikohe, administers the iwi. The Rūnanga acts on behalf of the iwi in consultations with the New Zealand government. It also ensures the equitable distribution of benefits from the 1992 fisheries settlement with the government, and undertakes resource management and education initiatives.

== History ==
=== Origins of Ngāpuhi ===
Ngāpuhi, like most iwi, trace their pre-history back to the land of Hawaiki, most likely from Raiatea. The name Ngāpuhi has many stories about its origin, (Note: As with most oral traditions, there are a number of different variations of stories both within and outside of different iwi. The story given here is not the definitive or "correct" version, but rather a basis from which other stories can be compared and understood.) but the most commonly known version is related to a story of an ariki in Hawaiki who lived many generations before Kupe, known as Kareroaiki. Whilst pregnant, Kareroariki craved a human heart to eat, and as a woman of high status, her request was fulfilled. After eating the heart of another ariki, Kareroariki went on to give birth to three children, known as Puhikaiariki, Puhimoanaariki, and Puhitaniwharau. The name "Ngāpuhi" is said to be taken from these children - literally, Ngā Puhi or "The Puhis". A common misconception is that the name Ngāpuhi comes from Puhi of the waka Mātaatua and maternal grandfather of Rāhiri, however there is little corroborating evidence for this claim.

The kōrero (legends/stories) of Ngāpuhi about Kupe's arrival to Aotearoa also differ from other iwi accounts. The more common version among other iwi is that Kupe was tasked with chasing down and killing Te Wheke-a-Muturangi, the giant pet octopus of Muturangi. He eventually followed the octopus to Aotearoa, where he cornered it and killed it in the Cook Strait, plucking out its eyes and throwing them, becoming Ngāwhatu (lit. "The Eyes") also known as The Brothers island group. The common Ngāpuhi version, however, states that Kupe fled Hawaiki to escape retribution for attempted murder and adultery. Kūrāmarotini, also known as Kura was married to another man, Hoturapa, though she still desired Kupe. Kupe and Kura would meet in secret, with Kura anointing her body with taramea oil so that Kupe could smell the fragrance. As Kura fell out of love with Hoturapa, her and Kupe devised a plan to kill him. Kupe asked Toto, Kuramarotini's father, for permission to go out with Hoturapa in a waka to fish and set traps. After Toto agreed, Kupe and Hoturapa set out for the fishing grounds. After Toto let down the anchor, Kupe secretly gave an incantation to ensure the anchor would become ensnared. After they had fished, Kupe asked Hoturapa to pull back up the anchor. With Hoturapa unable to do so due to Kupe's incantation, Kupe told him to dive down to investigate as to why it was stuck. After freeing the anchor, Hoturapa rose up from the water only to discover Kupe had gone, leaving him behind to drown. However, as Hoturapa came from a priestly dynasty, he was able to utter karakia to help send him back to shore, where he lived in secret. When Kupe arrived back from his fishing trip, he told the people that Hoturapa had been lost at sea and drowned, and eventually went on to marry Kura. However, news later came back that Hoturapa had actually survived, and Kupe and Kura, fearing that their ruse would be discovered, quickly absconded upon Kupe's waka, Matawhaorua, to the island said to have been fished up by Māui, Te-Ika-a-Māui.

After Kupe and Kura's journey to Aotearoa, they landed at the Hokianga, where they lived for a time. When they set off to return to Hawaiki, they were never to come back to Aotearoa again. Kupe left his son Tuputupuwhenua at the spring of Te Puna-o-te-Ao-Mārama, ("The Wellspring of the World of Light") where he said, "Tuputupuwhenua, hei konei rā. E hoki ana tēnei, e kore rā hau e hoki anga nui mai" ("Tuputupuwhenua, farewell. I leave you here on my great journey home, and I will not be returning again"), thus the name Te Hokianga-Nui-a-Kupe (The Great Return of Kupe), commonly shortened to Hokianga.

Kupe's descendant Nukutawhiti (Note: Accounts differ on the length and nature of the connection from Kupe to Nukutawhiti. Some people, such as Ngāpuhi academic Julian Wilcox have suggested that there are actually multiple Kupe and Nukutawhiti who have become consolidated over time.) also desired to travel and explore the world. (Note: Accounts also differ on Nukutawhiti's reason for leaving Hawaiki for Aotearoa. Hōne Sadler gives the reason as being a desire to see Te-Ika-a-Māui, though others such as Julian Wilcox have suggested climate issues or war as alternative theories, sometimes attributing different stories to different Nukutawhiti (see note B).) He asked Kupe if he could have his waka, Matawhaoarua, and Kupe agreed, gifting Nukutawhiti his waka and giving him advice for his travels. Nukutawhiti, seeing that the waka was riding low in the water, decided to re-adze it in order to lighten it, leading to the renaming of the waka to Ngātokimatawhaorua ("Re-adzed Matawhaorua"). As Nukutawhiti travelled to Aotearoa upon his waka alongside Ruanui, captain of the waka Māmari, he gave a karakia in order to summon storm and winds to quicken his journey, now known to Ngāpuhi and Te Rarawa as E kau ki te tai e ("Swim upon the sea"). During his journey, he was accompanied by a number of taniwha, Niniwa (also known as Niwa or Niua), and Āraiteuru being two of these taniwha. Upon Nukutawhiti's arrival to the Hokianga, he gave Niniwa and Āraiteuru each a strand of seaweed, and said to both of them "Ka [w]hakakōhatungia kourua e hau hei kaitiaki o te Hokianga" ("You two shall be cast into stone to be caretakers of the Hokianga"), thus the names of the two edges of the mouth of the Hokianga harbour; Niniwa at the northern end, and Āraiteuru at the southern end. Nukutawhiti and his descendants lived at the Hokianga for a number of generations until the birth of his descendant Rāhiri, at which time the iwi Ngāpuhi as it is known today would begin to take shape.

=== Foundations ===
The main founding ancestor of Ngāpuhi is Rāhiri, the son of Tauramoko and Te Hauangiangi. Tauramoko was a descendant of Kupe, from Matawhaorua, and Nukutawhiti, of the Ngātokimatawhaorua canoe. Te Hauangiangi was the daughter of Puhi, who captained the Mataatua canoe northwards from the Bay of Plenty. Rāhiri was born at Whiria pā, near Opononi in the Hokianga. The early tribes led by Rāhiri's descendants lived in the Hokianga, Kaikohe, and Pouerua areas.

Through intermarriage with other iwi and expansionist land migration, the descendants of Rāhiri formed tribes across the Northland peninsula. These actions also fostered ties with neighbouring iwi. Auha and Whakaaria, for example, led expansion eastward from Kaikohe and Pouērua into the Bay of Islands area, overrunning and often intermarrying with Ngāi Tāhuhu, Ngāti Manaia, Te Wahineiti and Ngāti Miru. These tribes in the east were the first to use the name Ngāpuhi. As the eastern and western groups merged, the name came to describe all the tribes settled in the Hokianga and Bay of Islands. In the late 1700s and early 1800s, the Ngāpuhi tribes pushed further east through the southern Bay of Islands to the open coast, absorbing tribes such as Ngāti Manu, Te Kapotai, Te Uri o Rata, Ngare Raumati, and Ngātiwai.

=== Hosting the first Christian mission ===
Ruatara was chief of the Ngāpuhi from 1812 to his death in 1815. In 1814, he invited the Rev. Samuel Marsden to set up the first ever Christian mission in New Zealand on Ngāpuhi land. The presence of these influential Pākehā secured Ruatara's access to European plants, technology and knowledge, which he distributed to other Māori, thus increasing his mana. After the death of Ruatara, his uncle Hongi Hika became protector of the mission.

Thomas Kendall, John King, and William Hall, missionaries of the Church Missionary Society, founded the first mission station in Oihi Bay (a small cove in the north-east of Rangihoua Bay) in the Bay of Islands in 1814 and over the next decades established farms and schools in the area. In 1823 Rev. Henry Williams and his wife Marianne established a mission station at Paihia on land owned by Ana Hamu, the wife of Te Koki. In 1826, Henry's brother William and his wife Jane joined the CMS mission at Paihia. Marianne and Jane Williams established schools for the Ngāpuhi. William Williams led the CMS missionaries in the translation of the Bible and other Christian literature; with the first chapters of the Māori Bible being printed at Paihia by William Colenso in 1827. The missionaries did not succeed in converting a single Māori until 1830 when Rawiri Taiwhanga (1818–1874), a Ngāpuhi chief, was baptised. Ruatara and Hongi Hika themselves welcomed the missionaries' presence, but did not convert. Hōne Heke attended the CMS mission school at Kerikeri and Heke and his wife Ono, were baptised in 1835.

=== Musket Wars ===
By the early 19th century, the Bay of Islands had become a prominent shipping port in New Zealand. Through increased trade with Europeans, initiated by Ruatara, Ngāpuhi gained greater access to European weapons, including muskets. Armed with European firearms, Ngāpuhi, led by Hongi Hika, launched a series of expansionist campaigns, with resounding slaughters across Northland and in the Waikato and Bay of Plenty.

=== United Tribes of New Zealand and the Declaration of Independence ===
On 28 October 1835, various Northland chiefs, primarily from the Ngāpuhi tribe, met at Waitangi with British resident James Busby and signed the Declaration of the Independence of New Zealand, proclaiming the United Tribes of New Zealand. In 1836, the Crown received and recognized the United Tribes' independence under King William IV. By 1839, 52 chiefs from around Northland and central North Island had signed the Declaration, including most Ngāpuhi chiefs and Pōtatau Te Wherowhero, ariki of the Tainui tribes of the Waikato (iwi).

=== Flagstaff War and re-erection of the flagstaff ===
In 1840, the Ngāpuhi chiefs were all signatories to the Treaty of Waitangi. However, from 1845 to 1846, Ngāpuhi fought against the British Crown over treaty disputes and European encroachment and interference. The Māori forces were led by Te Ruki Kawiti and Hōne Heke, who instigated the war when he chopped down the flagpole at Kororāreka to commence what is sometimes called the Flagstaff War. The British did not fight alone but had Ngāpuhi allies; Tāmati Wāka Nene had given the government assurances of the good behaviour of the Ngāpuhi and he felt that Hōne Heke had betrayed his trust in instigating the Flagstaff War.

The outcome of the Flagstaff War is a matter of some debate. Although the war was widely lauded as a British victory, it is clear that the outcome was somewhat more complex, even contentious. The flagstaff which had proved so controversial was not re-erected by the colonial government. Whilst the Bay of Islands and Hokianga was still nominally under British influence, the fact that the Government's flag was not re-erected was symbolically very significant. Such significance was not lost on Henry Williams, who, writing to E. G. Marsh on 28 May 1846, stated that "the flag-staff in the Bay is still prostrate, and the natives here rule. These are humiliating facts to the proud Englishman, many of whom thought they could govern by a mere name."

The legacy of Kawiti's rebellion during the Flagstaff War was that during the time of Governor Grey and Governor Thomas Gore Browne, the colonial administrators were obliged to take account of opinions of the Ngāpuhi before taking action in the Hokianga and Bay of Islands.

=== Post-Flagstaff War ===
The Waitangi Tribunal in The Te Roroa Report 1992 (Wai 38) stated that "[a]fter the war in the north, government policy was to place a buffer zone of European settlement between Ngāpuhi and Auckland. This matched Ngati Whatua's desire to have more settlers and townships, a greater abundance of trade goods and protection from Ngāpuhi, their traditional foe."

The flagstaff that now stands at Kororareka was erected in January 1858 at the direction of Kawiti's son Maihi Paraone Kawiti, as a signal to Governor Thomas Gore Browne, that Maihi did not follow his father's path. In a symbolic act, the 400 Ngāpuhi warriors involved in preparing and erecting the flagpole were selected from the "rebel" forces of Kawiti and Heke – that is, Ngāpuhi from the hapū of Tāmati Wāka Nene (who had fought as allies of the British forces during the Flagstaff War), observed, but did not participate in the erection of the fifth flagpole. The restoration of the flagpole by Maihi Paraone Kawiti was a voluntary act on the part of the Ngāpuhi that had cut it down on 11 March 1845, and they would not allow any other to render any assistance in this work. The erection of the fifth flagstaff at Kororareka by the Ngāpuhi warriors who had conducted the Flagstaff War, and not by government decree, indicates the colonial government did not want to risk any further confrontation with the Ngāpuhi. The continuing symbolism of the fifth flagpole at Kororareka is that it exists because of the goodwill of the Ngāpuhi.

Notwithstanding the achievements of Te Ruki Kawiti and Hōne Heke in pushing back colonial government control over the Ngāpuhi, in the years after the Flagstaff War over 2,000 km^{2} of Ngāpuhi land was alienated from Māori control. As part of Maihi Paraone Kawiti's erection of the fifth flagpole at Kororareka, he offered the Governor all the lands between Karetu and Moerewa to north of Waiomio and as far south as the Ruapekapeka Pa. Tawai Kawiti described this offer of land as being "a whariki" (or mat) for the flag to repose on. The offer was accepted but was paid for at half the land's value.

=== 20th and 21st centuries ===
Amidst cultural and economic decline, the twentieth century saw a steady migration of Ngāpuhi Māori from Northland into other regions of the North Island, mainly Auckland, Waikato and the Bay of Plenty. In part, this has seen the organisation of Ngāpuhi into large geographic and urban divisions.

Kia tū tika ai te whare tapu o Ngāpuhi.
(May the sacred house of Ngāpuhi always stand firm.)

— Ngāpuhi motto

The whārenui of Ōkorihi marae burned down in 2003.

== Waitangi Tribunal – Te Paparahi o te Raki (Wai 1040) ==
In 2010, the Waitangi Tribunal began hearings into the Ngāpuhi's claim that sovereignty was not given up in their signing of the Treaty of Waitangi. The Tribunal, in Te Paparahi o te Raki inquiry (Wai 1040), considered the Māori and Crown understandings of He Whakaputanga o te Rangatiratanga / The Declaration of Independence 1835 and Te Tiriti o Waitangi / the Treaty of Waitangi 1840.

Many of the arguments used were outlined in Paul Moon's 2002 book Te Ara Ki Te Tiriti: The Path to the Treaty of Waitangi, which argued that not only did the Māori signatories have no intention of transferring sovereignty, but that at the time the British government and James Busby did not wish to acquire it and that the developments and justifications leading to the present state were later developments. A common Ngāpuhi interpretation of the Declaration of the United Tribes is that the British government was simply recognizing Māori independence and putting the world on check, merely re-asserting sovereignty that had existed from "time immemorial".

The Te Paparahi o Te Raki stage 1 inquiry hearings phase was intended to reach conclusions as to the meaning and effect of the treaty for the Crown and Te Raki Māori in 1840. Hearings began in May 2010 and on 14 November 2014, the Te Raki stage 1 report handover took place at Te Tii Marae, Waitangi.

The key conclusion of the stage 1 report was that the treaty signatories did not cede sovereignty in February 1840. "That is, they did not cede authority to make and enforce law over their people or their territories." The rangatira did, however, agree "to share power and authority with Britain".

The consequences of the findings in the stage 1 report were considered in the Te Raki stage 2 inquiry, with the Tribunal hearings considering issues including the immediate aftermath of the Treaty of Waitangi, the Flagstaff War and Crown pre-emption (the right of the Crown to acquire Māori land that is addressed in the treaty).

== Hapū and marae ==
| Name | Takiwā | Marae (meeting grounds) |
|---|---|---|
| Kōhatutaka | Ngāpuhi Hokianga ki te Raki | Mangamuka Marae, Te Arohanui / Mangataipa |
| Māhurehure | Ngā Ngaru o Hokianga | Māhuri Marae, Moehau Marae, Arohamauora, Ōtātara, Tāheke, Tuhirangi Marae |
| Ngā Uri o Puhatahi | Te Takiwā o Ngāpuhi ki Whangārei | Omauri |
| Ngāi Tāwake | Ngāpuhi ki te Hauāuru, Te Rūnanga o Taumārere ki Rākaumangamanga | Pukerātā Marae, Tauwhara |
| Ngāi Tāwake ki te Moana | Ngāpuhi Hokianga ki te Raki | Mokonuiārangi Marae, Puketawa, Tauratumaru |
| Ngāi Tāwake ki te Tuawhenua | Ngāpuhi Hokianga ki te Raki | Piki te Aroha / Rāhiri |
| Ngāi Tāwake ki te Waoku | Ngāpuhi ki te Hauāuru | Kaingahoa Mataraua, Ngāi Tāwake Marae, Paripari Marae, Te Huehue Marae |
| Ngāi Tū Te Auru | Ngāpuhi ki te Hauāuru, west coast | Pukerātā Marae |
| Ngare Hauata | Taiāmai ki te Marangai, Ngāpuhi ki te Hauāuru | Oromāhoe Marae |
| Ngāti Hao | Ngāpuhi Hokianga ki te Raki, Te Takiwā o Ngāpuhi ki Whangārei | Paremata Marae, Piki te Aroha / Rāhiri, Puketawa, Tauratumaru, Pehiaweri, Whakapara |
| Ngāti Hau | Te Takiwā o Ngāpuhi ki Whangārei, Ngā Ngaru o Hokianga | Akerama, Ngāraratunua Marae, Pehiaweri, Whakapara, Te Pīti / Ōmanaia |
| Ngāti Hine | Te Takiwā o Ngāti Hine, Ngāpuhi ki te Hauāuru, Te Takiwā o Ngāpuhi ki Whangārei | Horomanga Marae, Kaikou, Kawiti Marae, Matawaia, Maungārongo, Miria Marae, Mohinui, Mōtatau, Ōtiria, Parakao Marae, Tau Henare Marae, Te Rito Marae, Ngāti Kahu o Torongare, Ngāti Kōpaki, Ngāti Ngāherehere, Ngāti Te Ara, Ngāti Te Tāwera, Te Kau i Mua, Te Orewai, Ngāraratunua Marae, Te Hūruhi, Tereawatea Marae |
| Ngāti Hineira | Te Rūnanga o Taumārere ki Rākaumangamanga | Parawhenua Marae, Rāwhitiroa / Te Ahuahu Marae, Tauwhara |
| Ngāti Hinemutu | Ngāpuhi ki te Hauāuru | Parihaka, Ōkorihi |
| Ngāti Horahia | Pākotai | Parahaki, Parakao Marae, Te Oruoru Marae, Te Tārai o Rāhiri |
| Ngāti Kahu o Torongare | Te Takiwā o Ngāpuhi ki Whangārei, Te Takiwā o Ngāti Hine | Ngāraratunua, Mohinui |
| Ngāti Kairewa | Ngā Ngaru o Hokianga | Mātai Aranui Marae, Mōria, Pā te Aroha Marae |
| Ngāti Kawa | Te Rūnanga o Taumārere ki Rākaumangamanga | Oromāhoe Marae, Te Tii Waitangi, Waitangi Upper Marae |
| Ngāti Kerewheti | Ngā Ngaru o Hokianga | Mātai Aranui Marae, Mōria, Pā te Aroha Marae |
| Ngāti Kiriahi | Te Rūnanga o Taumārere ki Rākaumangamanga | Ngāwhā Marae |
| Ngāti Kōpaki | Te Takiwā o Ngāti Hine | Ōtiria |
| Ngāti Korohue | Te Rūnanga o Taumārere ki Rākaumangamanga | Parawhenua Marae |
| Ngāti Korokoro | Ngā Ngaru o Hokianga | Kōkōhuia / Ōmāpere, Pākanae, Te Whakamaharatanga / Waimamaku, Waiwhatawhata / Aotea |
| Ngāti Kura | Ngāpuhi ki te Hauāuru, Te Rūnanga o Taumārere ki Rākaumangamanga | Kohewhata, Te Kotahitanga Marae, Matuari / Te Tāpui |
| Ngāti Kuta | Taiāmai ki te Marangai | Te Rāwhiti / Omakiwi |
| Ngāti Māhia | Ngāpuhi ki te Hauāuru | Te Hūruhi, Ururangi Marae |
| Ngāti Manu | Taiāmai ki te Marangai | Kāretu Marae |
| Ngāti Mau | Te Rūnanga o Taumārere ki Rākaumangamanga | Ngāwhā Marae, Wharengaere |
| Ngāti Miru | Te Rūnanga o Taumārere ki Rākaumangamanga | Matuari / Te Tāpui |
| Ngāti Moe | Pākotai | Parakao Marae, Te Oruoru Marae, Te Tārai o Rāhiri |
| Ngāti Moerewa | Ngāpuhi ki te Hauāuru | Te Hungāiti, Te Maata, Te Rīngi, Māhūhū ki te Rangi Marae |
| Ngāti Moko | Te Rūnanga o Taumārere ki Rākaumangamanga | Waitangi Upper Marae |
| Ngāti Ngāherehere | Te Takiwā o Ngāti Hine | Matawaia |
| Ngāti Pākau | Ngā Ngaru o Hokianga | Māhuri Marae, Tāheke Marae |
| Ngāti Pare | Taiāmai ki te Marangai | Waikare / Te Tūruki |
| Ngāti Rāhiri | Te Rūnanga o Taumārere ki Rākaumangamanga | Te Tii Waitangi, Oromāhoe Marae |
| Ngāti Rangi | Ngāpuhi ki te Hauāuru, Te Rūnanga o Taumārere ki Rākaumangamanga | Kaingahoa Mataraua, Te Hungāiti, Te Maata, Ngāwhā Marae |
| Ngāti Rauwawe | Ngā Ngaru o Hokianga | Tāheke Marae |
| Ngāti Rēhia | Te Rūnanga o Taumārere ki Rākaumangamanga | Hiruhārama Hou Marae, Korokota, Mātoa, Maungārongo, Tākou Marae, Tauwhara, Whitiora Marae |
| Ngāti Ruamahue | Te Rūnanga o Taumārere ki Rākaumangamanga | Various |
| Ngāti Tautahi | Ngāpuhi ki te Hauāuru, Te Rūnanga o Taumārere ki Rākaumangamanga | Parihaka, Te Kotahitanga Marae, Ōkorihi, Tākou Marae, Te Whetū Marama |
| Ngāti Tawake ki te Tuawhenua | Te Rūnanga o Taumārere ki Rākaumangamanga | Tauwhara |
| Ngāti Te Ara | Te Takiwā o Ngāti Hine | Ōtiria |
| Ngāti Te Pou | Ngā Ngaru o Hokianga | Kōkōhuia / Ōmāpere, Mātai Aranui Marae, Mōria, Pā te Aroha Marae, Te Pīti / Ōmanaia, Te Whakamaharatanga / Waimamaku |
| Ngāti Te Rēinga | Ngāpuhi Hokianga ki te Raki | Waihou / Waimirirangi |
| Ngāti Te Rino | Pākotai | Maungārongo, Parahaki Marae, Parakao Marae, Te Oruoru Marae, Te Tārai o Rāhiri |
| Ngāti Te Tāwera | Te Takiwā o Ngāti Hine | Mōtatau |
| Ngāti Toki | Pākotai | Parahaki Marae, Parakao Marae, Te Oruoru Marae, Te Tārai o Rāhiri |
| Ngāti Torehina | Te Rūnanga o Taumārere ki Rākaumangamanga | Wharengaere |
| Ngāti Toro | Ngāpuhi Hokianga ki te Raki, Ngā Ngaru o Hokianga | Mataitaua, Mokonuiārangi Marae, Paremata Marae, Piki te Aroha / Rāhiri, Puketawa, Rangatahi Marae, Motukiore, Tauratumaru Marae |
| Ngāti Tuapango | Ngā Ngaru o Hokianga, Te Rūnanga o Taumārere ki Rākaumangamanga | Matahuru Papakainga, Mōria, Pā te Aroha Marae, Tākou |
| Ngāti Ueoneone | Ngāpuhi ki te Hauāuru | Ōkorihi |
| Ngāti Wai | Ngā Ngaru o Hokianga | Various |
| Ngāti Whakaeke | Ngāpuhi ki te Hauāuru, Te Takiwā o Ngāti Hine, Te Rūnanga o Taumārere ki Rākaumangamanga | Te Kotahitanga Marae, Mātoa, Tākou, Parahaki Marae |
| Ngāti Whakaminenga | Pākotai | Te Kiore |
| Ngāti Whārara | Ngā Ngaru o Hokianga | Kōkōhuia / Ōmāpere, Pākanae, Waiwhatawhata / Aotea |
| Patukeha | Taiāmai ki te Marangai | Kaingahoa Rāwhiti, Te Rāwhiti / Omakiwi |
| Takoto Kē | Ngāpuhi ki te Hauāuru | Kohewhata, Te Kotahitanga Marae |
| Te Hikutu | Ngā Ngaru o Hokianga | Mātai Aranui Marae, Mōria, Pā te Aroha Marae |
| Te Honihoni | Ngāpuhi Hokianga ki te Raki | Puketawa, Tauratumaru Marae |
| Te Kapotai | Bay of Islands | Kororareka, Waikare / Te Tūruki, Rāwhitiroa / Te Ahuahu Marae, Waikare / Te Tūruki |
| Te Kau i Mua | Te Takiwā o Ngāti Hine | Matawaia |
| Te Kumutu | Pākotai | Parahaki Marae, Te Oruoru Marae |
| Te Māhurehure | Te Rūnanga o Taumārere ki Rākaumangamanga | Te Raukura Marae |
| Te Ngahengahe | Ngāpuhi Hokianga ki te Raki | Mokonuiārangi Marae, Rangatahi Marae |
| Te Orewai | Te Takiwā o Ngāti Hine | Tau Henare Marae |
| Te Parawhau | Te Takiwā o Ngāpuhi ki Whangārei, Te Takiwā o Ngāti Hine | Ngāraratunua, Pehiaweri, Toetoe Marae, Korokota, Maungārongo, Parakao Marae, Tangiterōria Marae |
| Te Patuharakeke | Te Takiwā o Ngāpuhi ki Whangārei | Takahiwai |
| Te Popoto | Ngāpuhi Hokianga ki te Raki, Te Rūnanga o Taumārere ki Rākaumangamanga | Rangatahi Marae, Tauratumaru Marae, Rāwhitiroa / Te Ahuahu Marae |
| Te Poukā | Ngā Ngaru o Hokianga | Kōkōhuia / Ōmāpere, Pākanae, Waiwhatawhata / Aotea |
| Te Rauwera | Taiāmai ki te Marangai | Te Rauwera |
| Te Uri Karaka | Taiāmai ki te Marangai | Kāretu |
| Te Uri Māhoe | Ngāpuhi Hokianga ki te Raki | Mangamuka Marae, Te Arohanui / Mangataipa |
| Te Uri o Hawato | Te Rūnanga o Taumārere ki Rākaumangamanga | Ngāwhā Marae, Kaikou |
| Te Uri o Hua | Ngāpuhi ki te Hauāuru | Kohewhata, Te Kotahitanga Marae |
| Te Uri Ongaonga | Taiāmai ki te Marangai | Waimangaro |
| Te Uri Taniwha | Te Rūnanga o Taumārere ki Rākaumangamanga | Ngāwhā Marae, Parawhenua Marae, Rāwhitiroa / Te Ahuahu Marae |
| Te Uriroroi | Te Takiwā o Ngāpuhi ki Whangārei, Te Takiwā o Ngāti Hine | Pehiaweri, Toetoe Marae, Maungārongo Marae, Tangiterōria |
| Te Whānau Whero | Ngā Ngaru o Hokianga | Mātai Aranui Marae, Mōria, Pā te Aroha Marae |
| Te Whanauwhero | Te Rūnanga o Taumārere ki Rākaumangamanga | Parawhenua Marae |
| Uri o Te Tangata | Te Takiwā o Ngāpuhi ki Whangārei | Te Kotahitanga Marae o Otangarei, Terenga Parāoa |
| Whānautara | Te Rūnanga o Taumārere ki Rākaumangamanga | Tauwhara |

== Media ==
Tautoko FM broadcasts to the people of Ngāpuhi-nui-tonu, and began operating on 28 November 1988. It broadcasts on 99.5 FM in Mangamuka. The Tautoko FM building burnt to the ground on 18 May 2015, cutting power to the small Mangamuka community.

== Religion ==
Most Ngāpuhi, 49.6%, identify as being irreligious, according to data from Te Whata iwi estimates, based on 2018 Census data. 42.2% of Ngāpuhi specify a religious affiliation, larger than the 38.1% of Māori as a whole who specify religious affiliation.

| Religious affiliation | % |
|---|---|
| Irreligious | 49.6 |
| Christian | 33.70 |
| Catholic | 8.6 |
| Anglican | 6.9 |
| Christian nfd | 6.2 |
| Latter-day Saints | 4.5 |
| Pentecostal nfd | 1.8 |
| Presbyterian, Congregational, and Reformed | 1.5 |
| Methodist nfd | 1.4 |
| Jehovah's Witnesses | 0.9 |
| Baptist nfd | 0.4 |
| Evangelical, Born Again, and Fundamentalist | 0.4 |
| Seventh-day Adventist | 0.4 |
| Other Christian | 0.4 |
| Māori Religions | 8 |
| Rātana | 6.8 |
| Ringatū | 0.5 |
| Māori Religions, Beliefs, and Philosophies nfd/nec | 0.7 |
| Spiritualism and New Age religions | 0.5 |
| Jediism | 0.4 |
| Islam | 0.2 |
| Buddhism | 0.2 |
| Hinduism | <0.1 |
| Other | 0.6 |
| Object to answering | 8.2 |

== Notable Ngāpuhi people ==
- Willie Apiata (born 1972), first recipient of the Victoria Cross for New Zealand
- Fred Baker (1908–1958), soldier and leader of the Māori Battalion
- Donna Campbell (born 1959), university teacher, curator, weaver, and textile artist
- Keisha Castle-Hughes (born 1990), actress
- Marama Davidson (born 1973), politician and co-leader of the Green Party
- Kelvin Davis (born 1967), politician and deputy leader of the Labour Party
- Abby Erceg (born 1989), soccer player
- Annabella Mary Geddes (1864–1955), welfare worker and community leader
- James George (born 1962), novelist, short story writer and creative writing lecturer
- Sid Going (1943-2024), rugby union player
- Ana Hamu (died 1848), woman of high rank and Treaty of Waitangi signatory
- Hōne Heke (1808–1850), chief
- Hongi Hika (c. 1772–1828), chief
- Maewa Kaihau (1879–1941), composer, pianist and music teacher
- Te Ruki Kawiti (1770s–1854), chief
- Maihi Paraone Kawiti (1807–1889), chief
- Jason Kerrison (born 1976), singer, songwriter and producer
- Rehutai Maihi (1895–1967), journalist, newspaper publisher and editor and political candidate
- Matt McCarten (born 1959), political organiser and trade unionist
- Anika Moa (born 1980), recording artist and television presenter
- Moetara (died 1838), chief, agriculturalist and trader
- Katerina Nēhua (1903–1948), endurance swimmer
- Pania Newton (born 1990 or 1991), lawyer and political activist
- Tāmati Wāka Nene (1780s–1871), chief
- Tracey Panek, historian and archivist
- Evelyn Patuawa-Nathan (born 1933), poet
- Piripi Patiki (1813–1881), chief, teacher and missionary
- Eruera Maihi Patuone (c. 1764–1872), chief
- Pokaia (died 1807), chief
- Pōmare I (died 1826), chief
- Pōmare II (died 1850), chief
- Diane Prince (born 1952), painter, weaver, installation art practitioner, and set designer
- Rachael Rakena (born 1969), artist
- Ruatara (c. 1787–1815), chief
- Dover Samuels (born 1939) politician, former Minister of Māori Affairs
- Ben Stokes (born 1991), professional cricketer and captain of the England Cricket Team
- Rawiri Taiwhanga (1818–1874), chief, farmer, Anglican missionary, and teacher
- Sam Tanner (born 2000), middle-distance athlete (ie. running)
- Aperahama Taonui (died 1882), chief, prophet, historian, teacher, and assessor
- Ihaia Te Ahu (c. 1820–1895), teacher and missionary
- Parore Te Awha (died 1887), chief
- Moka Te Kainga-mataa (1790s–1860s), chief
- Samuel Te Kani (born 1990), author, artist, and sexpert
- Te Pahi (died 1810), chief and traveller
- Te Whareumu (died 1828), chief
- Tītore (c. 1775–1837), chief
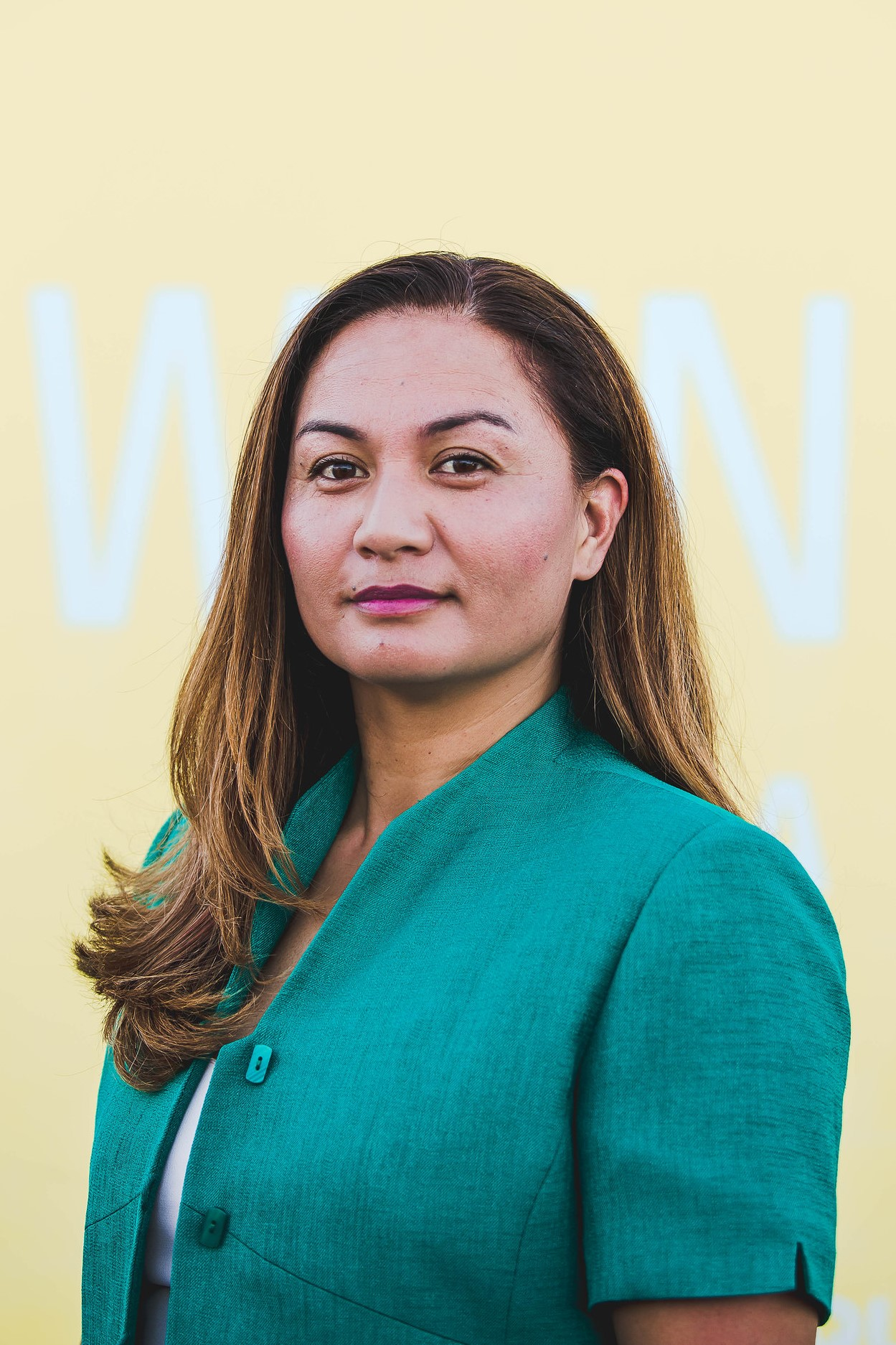
Marama Davidson

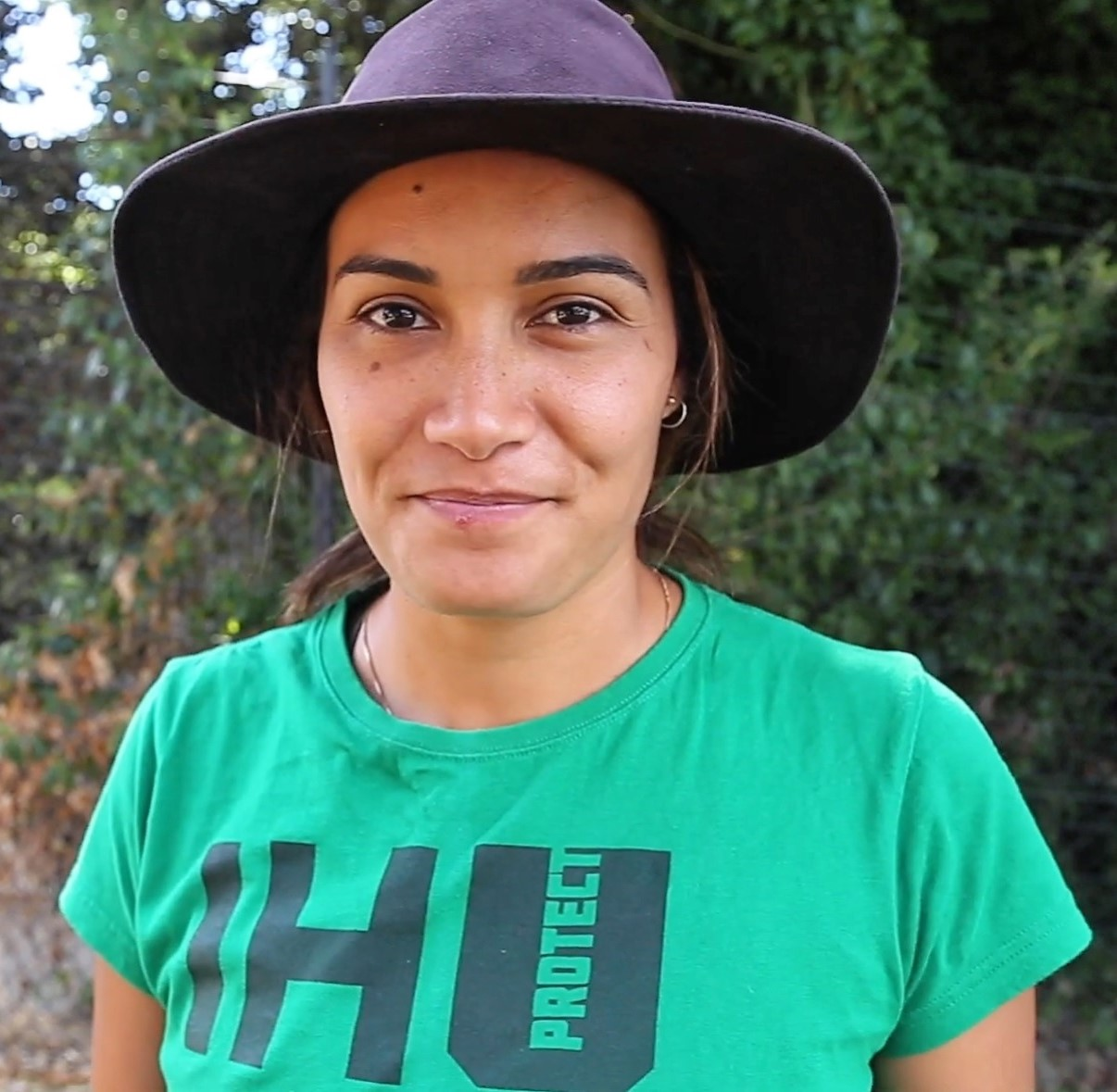
Pania Newton

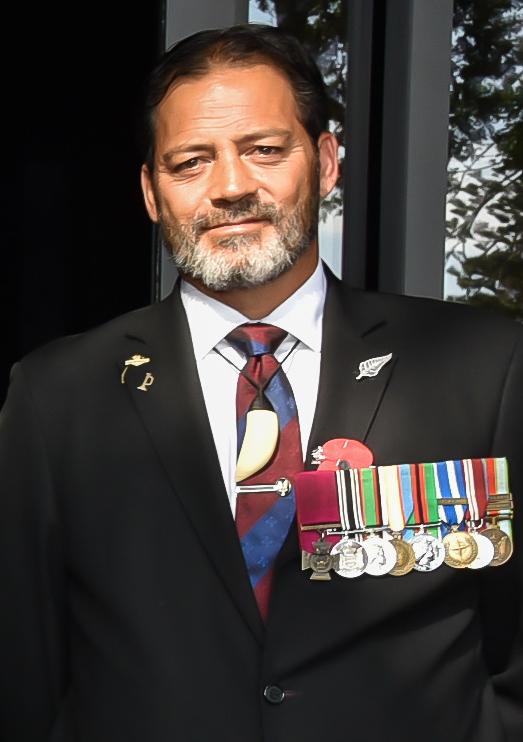
Willie Apiata

== See also ==
- List of iwi
- Ngāti Hine, a subtribe
