= Whakapara =

Village on North Island, New Zealand

Coordinates: 35.547815°S 174.277798°E

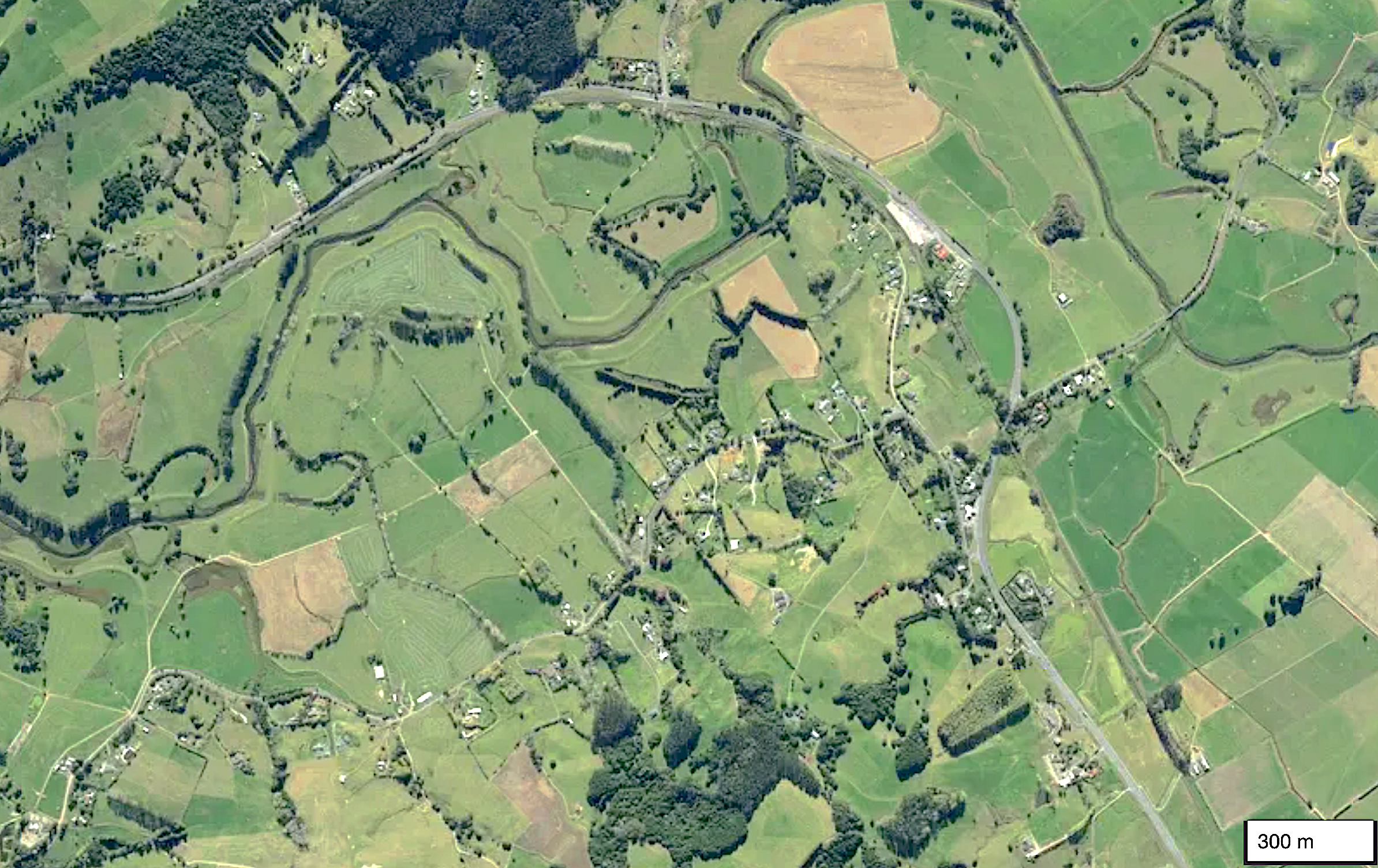
Whakapara aerial view of the village, river, SH1 and railway

Whakapara is a village and rural community in the Whangarei District, six kilometres north of Hikurangi, twenty-two kilometres north of central Whangārei, and eight kilometres south-east of Hūkerenui, in the Northland Region of New Zealand's North Island. State Highway 1 and the North Auckland railway line run through Whakapara.

The village includes the Whakapara Marae and Te Ihi o Nehua meeting house, a meeting place of the Ngāpuhi hapū of Ngāti Hao and Ngāti Hau.
