= Opononi =

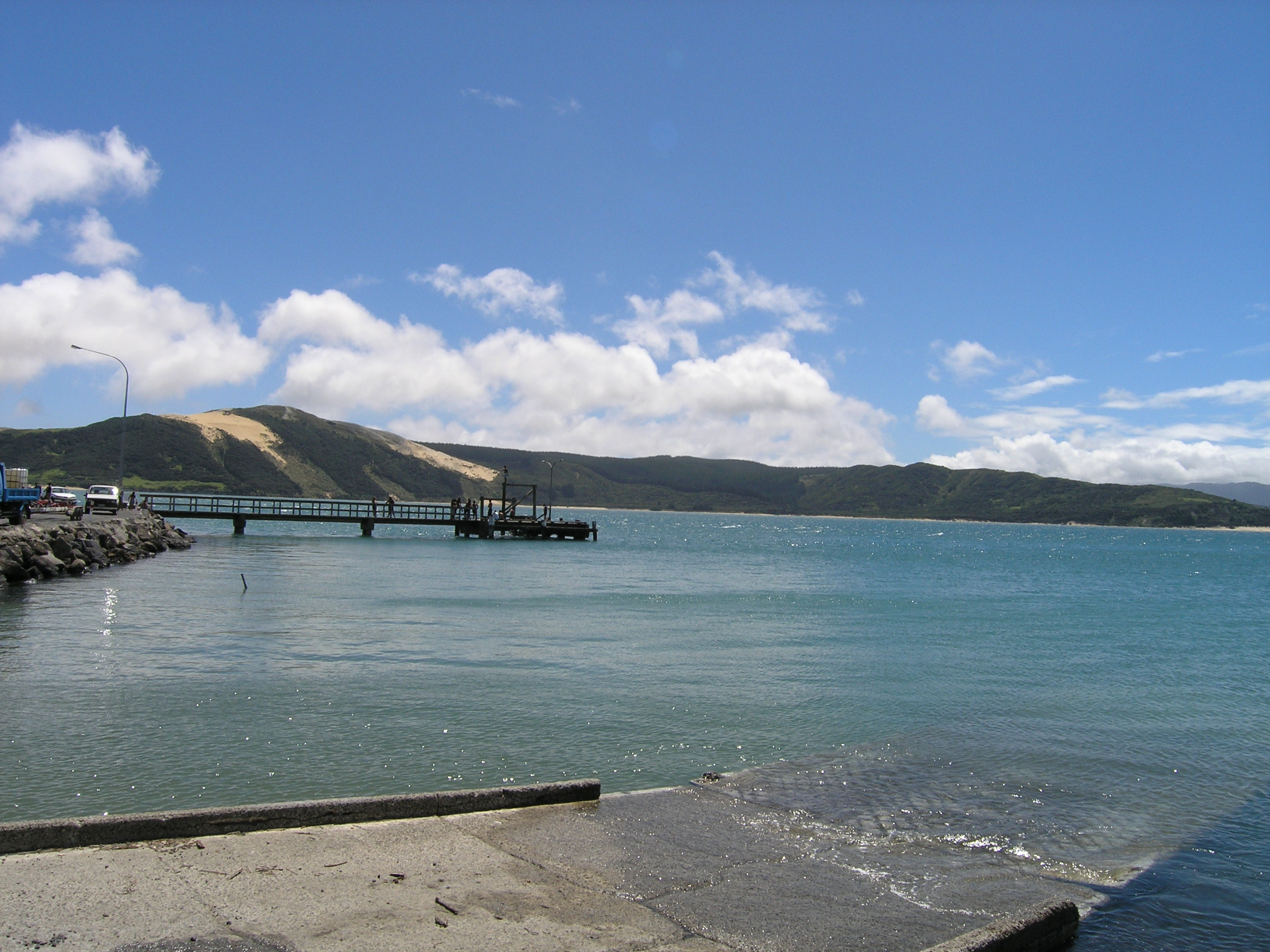
- Boat ramp and wharf
- Interactive map of Opononi
- Coordinates: 35°30′45″S 173°23′25″E
- Country: New Zealand
- Region: Northland Region
- District: Far North District
- Ward: Kaikohe/Hokianga
- Community: Kaikohe-Hokianga
- Subdivision: South Hokianga
- Electorates: Northland; Te Tai Tokerau

Government
  - Territorial authority: Far North District Council
  - Regional council: Northland Regional Council
  - Mayor of Far North: Moko Tepania
  - Northland MP: Grant McCallum
  - Te Tai Tokerau MP: TBD

Area
  - Total: 0.50 km^{2} (0.19 sq mi)

Population (June 2025)
  - Total: 270
  - Density: 540/km^{2} (1,400/sq mi)

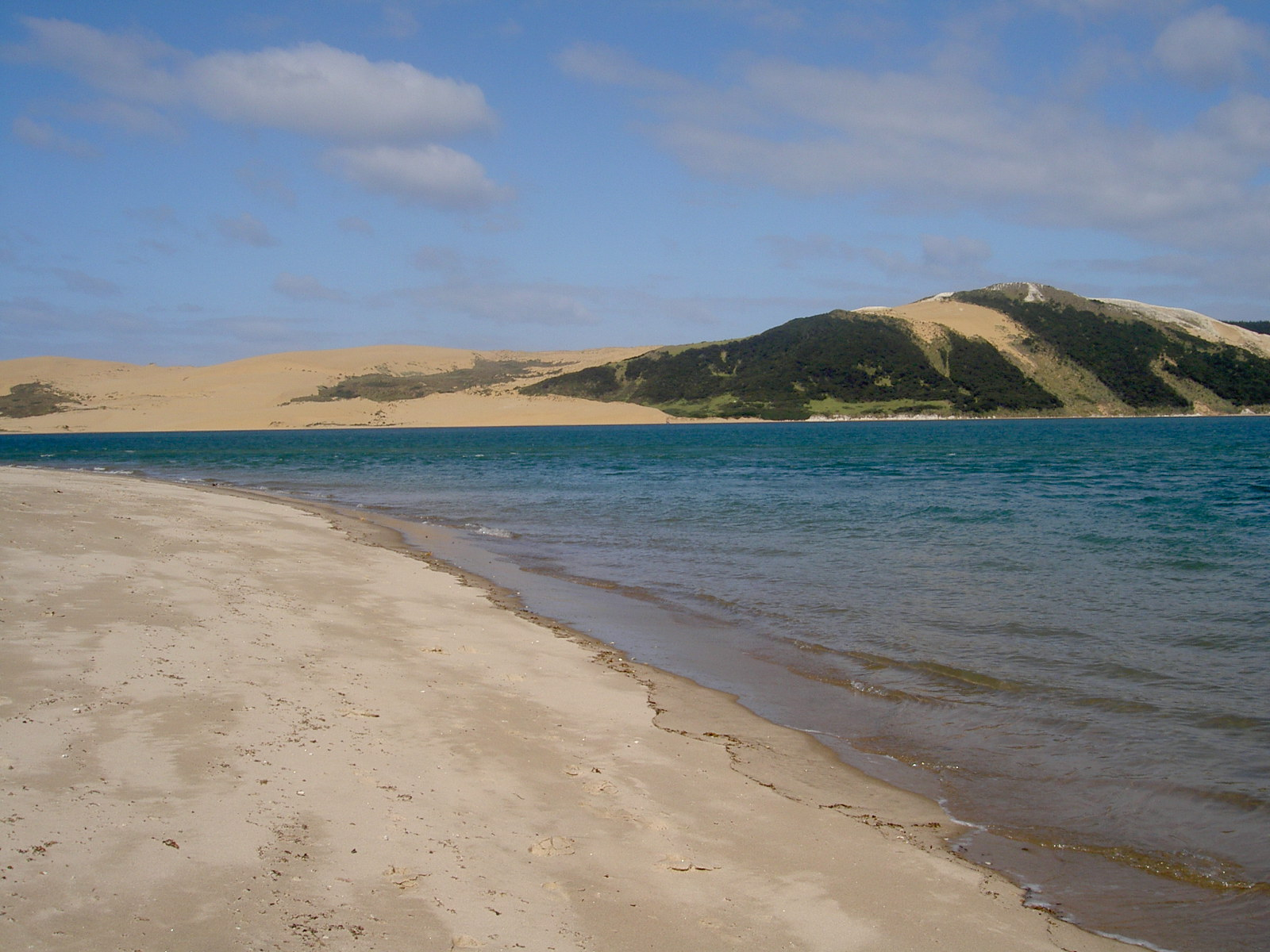
Opononi beach

Opononi is a settlement on the south shore of Hokianga Harbour in Northland, New Zealand. State Highway 12 runs through it. Ōmāpere is a settlement on the shore to the south, and Pākanae is to the north-east.

According to the New Zealand Ministry for Culture and Heritage, the name Opononi roughly translates to "place of crooked fishing post" in Māori.

== History ==
=== European settlement ===
John Webster arrived in New Zealand in 1841. In 1855, he bought 700 acres of rough land at Opononi, and established a homestead and pastoral farm. He developed this into a showplace, entertaining vice-royalty several times. He also built a wharf, gum-store and a trading store. In 1894, Webster put the house and farm on the market. The store and gum store were taken over by Alfred Sprye Andrewes who later converted the gum store into a two storey hotel.

=== 20th century ===
The Opononi Post and Telephone was opened in 1892 and operated until 1989. The road between Opononi and Ōmāpere was developed in the mid 1930s leading to ribbon development. In 1959, a fire destroyed the Opononi Hotel and Opononi Store.

Opononi became famous throughout New Zealand in the summer of 1955 and 1956 due to the exploits of a dolphin called Opo.

== Demographics ==
Statistics New Zealand describes Opononi as a rural settlement. It covers 0.50 km^{2} (0.19 sq mi) and had an estimated population of 270 as of June 2025, with a population density of 540 people per km^{2}. The settlement is part of the larger Waipoua Forest statistical area.

Historical population for Opononi
Year	Pop.	±% p.a.
2006	222	—
2013	204	−1.20%
2018	252	+4.32%
2023	264	+0.93%

Opononi had a population of 264 in the 2023 New Zealand census, an increase of 12 people (4.8%) since the 2018 census, and an increase of 60 people (29.4%) since the 2013 census. There were 123 males, 138 females and 3 people of other genders in 114 dwellings. 2.3% of people identified as LGBTIQ+. The median age was 52.7 years (compared with 38.1 years nationally). There were 51 people (19.3%) aged under 15 years, 30 (11.4%) aged 15 to 29, 99 (37.5%) aged 30 to 64, and 84 (31.8%) aged 65 or older.

People could identify as more than one ethnicity. The results were 60.2% European (Pākehā); 64.8% Māori; 8.0% Pasifika; 4.5% Asian; and 1.1% Middle Eastern, Latin American and African New Zealanders (MELAA). English was spoken by 95.5%, Māori language by 23.9%, Samoan by 1.1% and other languages by 4.5%. No language could be spoken by 2.3% (e.g. too young to talk). The percentage of people born overseas was 6.8, compared with 28.8% nationally.

Religious affiliations were 40.9% Christian, 1.1% Hindu, 3.4% Māori religious beliefs, 1.1% New Age, and 1.1% other religions. People who answered that they had no religion were 48.9%, and 6.8% of people did not answer the census question.

Of those at least 15 years old, 24 (11.3%) people had a bachelor's or higher degree, 117 (54.9%) had a post-high school certificate or diploma, and 66 (31.0%) people exclusively held high school qualifications. The median income was $24,300, compared with $41,500 nationally. 6 people (2.8%) earned over $100,000 compared to 12.1% nationally. The employment status of those at least 15 was that 63 (29.6%) people were employed full-time, 36 (16.9%) were part-time, and 6 (2.8%) were unemployed.

=== Waipoua Forest statistical area ===
Waipoua Forest contains Opononi and Ōmāpere, and covers 277.86 km^{2} (107.28 sq mi). It had an estimated population of 1,310 as of June 2025, with a population density of 4.7 people per km^{2}.

Historical population for Waipoua Forest statistical area
Year	Pop.	±% p.a.
2006	1,119	—
2013	1,035	−1.11%
2018	1,215	+3.26%
2023	1,305	+1.44%

Waipoua Forest had a population of 1,305 in the 2023 New Zealand census, an increase of 90 people (7.4%) since the 2018 census, and an increase of 270 people (26.1%) since the 2013 census. There were 651 males, 651 females and 3 people of other genders in 546 dwellings. 3.0% of people identified as LGBTIQ+. The median age was 52.7 years (compared with 38.1 years nationally). There were 225 people (17.2%) aged under 15 years, 138 (10.6%) aged 15 to 29, 564 (43.2%) aged 30 to 64, and 375 (28.7%) aged 65 or older.

People could identify as more than one ethnicity. The results were 62.1% European (Pākehā); 58.6% Māori; 5.3% Pasifika; 3.7% Asian; 0.5% Middle Eastern, Latin American and African New Zealanders (MELAA); and 2.3% other, which includes people giving their ethnicity as "New Zealander". English was spoken by 97.0%, Māori language by 22.1%, Samoan by 0.7% and other languages by 5.1%. No language could be spoken by 2.1% (e.g. too young to talk). New Zealand Sign Language was known by 0.5%. The percentage of people born overseas was 10.6, compared with 28.8% nationally.

Religious affiliations were 37.9% Christian, 0.7% Hindu, 3.9% Māori religious beliefs, 0.5% Buddhist, 0.9% New Age, and 0.9% other religions. People who answered that they had no religion were 45.7%, and 9.9% of people did not answer the census question.

Of those at least 15 years old, 138 (12.8%) people had a bachelor's or higher degree, 591 (54.7%) had a post-high school certificate or diploma, and 321 (29.7%) people exclusively held high school qualifications. The median income was $23,800, compared with $41,500 nationally. 42 people (3.9%) earned over $100,000 compared to 12.1% nationally. The employment status of those at least 15 was that 339 (31.4%) people were employed full-time, 180 (16.7%) were part-time, and 42 (3.9%) were unemployed.

== Education ==
The first school was the Pakia Native School which opened in 1874 under the Native School Act. In 1912 the school was renamed Omapere. Opononi did not have a school of its own and children either went to Pakia/Omapere School, or after it opened in 1909, to Pakanae School. In 1974, the newly built Opononi Area School replaced both.

Opononi Area School is a coeducational composite (years 1–15) school with a roll of 170 students.
