= List of schools in the Northland Region =

Schools in northern New Zealand

Localities offering secondary education in Northland

Northland is the northernmost region of New Zealand. It contains numerous rural primary schools, some small town primary and secondary schools, and a small number of city schools. Area schools in isolated areas provide complete education from primary to secondary level. Intermediate schools exist in Kaitaia, Kaikohe, Dargaville, Whangārei and Kamo.

All schools are coeducational except for Whangārei Boys' and Girls' High Schools in Whangārei. The only private schools are Springbank School in Kerikeri and Otamatea Christian School in Maungaturoto.

Several Kura Kaupapa Māori schools exist in the region, all but one in the Far North District. These schools teach solely or principally in the Māori language. The name "Te Kura Kaupapa Māori o (placename)" can be translated as "The Kaupapa Māori School of (placename)".

In New Zealand schools, students begin formal education in Year 1 at the age of five. Year 13 is the final year of secondary education. Years 14 and 15 refer to adult education facilities.

State schools are those fully funded by the government and at which no fees can be charged, although a donation is commonly requested. A state integrated school is a state school with a special character based on a religious or philosophical belief. A private school, also known as an independent school, charges fees to its students.

The equity index (EQI) is a measure of the average socioeconomic status of the school's roll: the higher the number, the more socioeconomic barriers students face to achievement. For statistical purposes, schools are banded into seven bands based on their EQI and the barriers faced: fewest, few, below average, average, above average, many, and most. The EQI and band given here are based on figures from 2026. The roll of each school changes frequently as students start school for the first time, move between schools, and graduate. The rolls given here are those provided by the Ministry of Education, based on figures from July 2026. The Ministry of Education institution number, given in the last column, links to the Education Counts page for each school.

== Far North ==
The Far North District includes the towns of Opononi, Kaikohe and Kawakawa, and the areas north of these towns.

Name	Years	Area	Authority	EQI (band)	Roll	Website	MOE
Ahipara School	1–8	Ahipara	State	509 (many)	204		1000
Awanui School	1–6	Awanui	State	544 (most)	44	—	1004
Bay of Islands College	9–15	Kawakawa	State	530 (most)	486		8
Broadwood Area School	1–15	Broadwood	State	558 (most)	126		6
Herekino School	1–8	Herekino	State	532 (most)	23	—	1013
Horeke School	1–6	Horeke	State	565 (most)	29	—	1016
Kaeo Primary School	1–6	Kaeo	State	526 (most)	136		1019
Kaikohe Christian School	1–15	Kaikohe	State integrated	516 (many)	154		1175
Kaikohe East School	1–6	Kaikohe	State	549 (most)	244	—	1021
Kaikohe Intermediate	7–8	Kaikohe	State	555 (most)	119	—	1022
Kaikohe West School	1–6	Kaikohe	State	557 (most)	182		1023
Kaingaroa School	1–8	Kaingaroa	State	490 (above average)	106		1024
Kaitaia College	9–15	Kaitaia	State	522 (most)	732		3
Kaitaia Intermediate	7–8	Kaitaia	State	541 (most)	218	—	1025
Kaitaia Primary School	1–6	Kaitaia	State	544 (most)	284		1026
Karetu School	1–8	Karetu	State	497 (many)	80		1031
Kawakawa Primary School	1–8	Kawakawa	State	531 (most)	236	—	1033
Kerikeri High School	7–15	Kerikeri	State	463 (average)	1,640		5
Kerikeri Primary School	1–6	Kerikeri	State	462 (average)	511	—	1034
Kohukohu School	1–8	Kohukohu	State	543 (most)	24		1035
Mangamuka School	1–6	Mangamuka	State	556 (most)	12	—	1037
Mangonui School	1–6	Mangōnui	State	495 (many)	161		1039
Maromaku School	1–8	Maromaku	State	485 (above average)	20		2102
Matauri Bay School	1–6	Matauri Bay	State	549 (most)	43	—	1044
Te Kura o Mātihetihe	1–8	Matihetihe	State	552 (most)	22	—	1046
Moerewa School	1–8	Moerewa	State	552 (most)	131		2103
Motatau School	1–8	Motatau	State	539 (most)	62	—	1053
Ngataki School	1–8	Ngataki	State	551 (most)	65	—	1055
Northland College	9–15	Kaikohe	State	552 (most)	309		9
Ohaeawai School	1–6	Ōhaeawai	State	491 (above average)	153		1058
Okaihau College	7–15	Ōkaihau	State	516 (many)	263		7
Okaihau Primary School	1–6	Ōkaihau	State	510 (many)	134		1059
Te Kura o Ōmanaia	1–8	Omanaia	State	529 (most)	67	—	1060
Opononi Area School	1–15	Opononi	State	537 (most)	170	—	11
Opua School	1–8	Opua	State	447 (below average)	97		1063
Oromahoe School	1–8	Oromahoe	State	450 (average)	166		1065
Oruaiti School	1–8	Oruaiti	State	467 (average)	162		1066
Oturu School	1–8	Kaitaia	State	569 (most)	119	—	1071
Paihia School	1–8	Paihia	State	497 (many)	148		1072
Pakaraka School	1–8	Pakaraka	State	521 (many)	66		1073
Pamapuria School	1–6	Pamapuria	State	546 (most)	99		1076
Paparore School	1–6	Paparore	State	483 (above average)	163		1078
Peria School	1–8	Peria	State	498 (many)	68		1081
Pompallier School	1–8	Kaitaia	State integrated	462 (average)	161		1082
Pukenui School	1–8	Pukenui	State	484 (above average)	102	—	1086
Pukepoto School	1–6	Kaitaia	State	560 (most)	26		1087
Rawene School	1–8	Rawene	State	523 (most)	67	—	1093
Riverview School	1–6	Kerikeri	State	436 (below average)	406		1594
Russell School	1–8	Russell	State	465 (average)	64	—	1096
Springbank School	1–15	Kerikeri	Private	n/a	197		436
Taipa Area School	1–15	Taipā	State	530 (most)	421		2
Tautoro School	1–8	Tautoro	State	550 (most)	149		2101
Te Hapua School	1–8	Te Hāpua	State	550 (most)	13		1109
Te Kura ā Iwi o Pawarenga	1–8	Rotokakahi	State	537 (most)	17		932
Te Kura o Hato Hohepa Te Kamura	1–8	Whangaroa Harbour	State integrated	543 (most)	3	—	1100
Te Kura o Te Kao	1–8	Te Kao	State	533 (most)	88	—	1
Te Kura o Waikare	1–8	Waikare	State	537 (most)	65		1666
Te Kura Taumata o Panguru	1–15	Panguru	State	542 (most)	112		10
Te Rangi Aniwaniwa	1–15	Awanui	State	519 (many)	180	—	1147
Te Tii School	1–8	Te Tii	State	486 (above average)	57	—	1112
Te Kura Kaupapa Māori o Kaikohe	1–15	Kaikohe	State	521 (many)	243		4227
Te Kura Kaupapa Māori o Pukemiro	1–8	Kaitaia	State	537 (most)	150	—	3114
Te Kura Kaupapa Maori o Taumarere	1–15	Moerewa	State	523 (most)	126	—	2104
Te Kura Kaupapa Māori o Te Tonga o Hokianga	1–8	Whirinaki	State	521 (many)	139	—	3117
Te Kura Kaupapa Māori o Whangaroa	1–8	Matauri Bay	State	540 (most)	29	—	3106
Totara North School	1–6	Whangaroa Harbour	State	487 (above average)	19	—	1116
Umawera School	1–6	Umawera	State	502 (many)	28	—	1119
Waiharara School	1–8	Waiharara	State	561 (most)	17	—	1120
Te Kura O Waima	1–8	Waimā	State	552 (most)	46	—	1122
Whangaroa College	7–15	Kaeo	State	540 (most)	100	—	4

== Whangārei ==
The Whangarei District covers the east and centre of the Northland region. It includes Ruakākā, Tauraroa, and Titoki, but not Kawakawa.

Name	Years	Area	Authority	EQI (band)	Roll	Website	MOE
Blomfield Special School and Resource Centre	–	Whangārei	State	518 (many)	182		1007
Bream Bay College	7–15	Ruakākā	State	482 (above average)	618		20
Excellere College	1–15	Springs Flat	State integrated	452 (average)	360		429
Glenbervie School	1–6	Glenbervie	State	437 (below average)	225		1011
He Mataariki School for Teen Parents	–	Raumanga	State	569 (most)	n/a	—	2757
Hikurangi School	1–8	Hikurangi	State	526 (most)	177	—	1014
Hora Hora Primary School	1–6	Horahora	State	534 (most)	314		1015
Huanui College	7–15	Glenbervie	Private	n/a	358		620
Hukerenui School Years 1-8	1–8	Hūkerenui	State	476 (above average)	166		1017
Hurupaki School	1–6	Kamo	State	436 (below average)	326	—	1018
Kamo High School	9–15	Kamo	State	508 (many)	799		13
Kamo Intermediate	7–8	Kamo	State	482 (above average)	618		1029
Kamo Primary School	1–6	Kamo	State	467 (average)	403		1030
Kaurihohore School	1–6	Kauri	State	439 (below average)	180	—	1032
Kokopu School	1–8	Kokopu	State	461 (average)	123		1036
Manaia View School	1–8	Raumanga	State	565 (most)	187		1648
Mangakahia Area School	1–15	Titoki	State	560 (most)	80		18
Matarau School	1–8	Matarau	State	440 (below average)	280		1043
Maungakaramea School	1–8	Maungakaramea	State	438 (below average)	121	—	1047
Maungatapere School	1–8	Maungatapere	State	430 (below average)	306		1048
Maunu School	1–6	Maunu	State	409 (few)	311		1050
Morningside School	1–6	Morningside	State	490 (above average)	315		1052
Ngunguru School	1–8	Ngunguru	State	427 (few)	233	—	1056
One Tree Point School	1–6	One Tree Point	State	441 (below average)	249		1061
Onerahi Primary School	1–6	Onerahi	State	489 (above average)	403		1062
Otaika Valley School	1–6	Otaika	State	470 (above average)	163	—	1068
Pakotai School	1–8	Pakotai	State	562 (most)	23	—	1075
Parua Bay School	1–8	Parua Bay	State	432 (below average)	291	—	1080
Pompallier Catholic College	7–15	Maunu	State integrated	424 (few)	650		17
Poroti School	1–8	Poroti	State	501 (many)	40	—	1083
Portland School	1–6	Portland	State	515 (many)	105	—	1084
Purua School	1–8	Purua	State	513 (many)	31	—	1089
Raurimu Avenue School	1–8	Onerahi	State	569 (most)	42	—	1092
Renew School	1–15	Morningside	State integrated	461 (average)	194		1138
Ruakaka School	1–6	Ruakākā	State	485 (above average)	297	—	1094
St Francis Xavier Catholic School	1–6	Whau Valley	State integrated	404 (few)	463		1588
Tauraroa Area School	1–15	Tauraroa	State	477 (above average)	432		12
Te Horo School	1–8	Pipiwai	State	562 (most)	44	—	1110
Te Kura o Otangarei	1–8	Otangarei	State	569 (most)	90		1069
Tikipunga High School	7–15	Tikipunga	State	560 (most)	359		14
Tikipunga Primary School	1–6	Tikipunga	State	548 (most)	337	—	1113
Te Kura Kaupapa Maori o Te Rawhiti Roa	1–15	Tikipunga	State	535 (most)	188	—	1154
Totara Grove School	1–6	Kamo	State	530 (most)	278	—	1028
Waiotira School	1–6	Waiotira	State	465 (average)	28		1124
Waipu Primary School	1–6	Waipu	State	438 (below average)	246		1125
Whananaki School	1–8	Whananaki	State	523 (most)	51	—	1127
Whangarei Adventist Christian School	1–8	Whau Valley	State integrated	474 (above average)	30	—	4154
Whangārei Boys' High School	9–15	Whangārei	State	474 (above average)	1,442		15
Whangārei Girls' High School	9–15	Whangārei	State	471 (above average)	1,522		16
Whangarei Heads School	1–8	Whangārei Heads	State	408 (few)	142		1128
Whangarei Intermediate	7–8	Whangārei	State	506 (many)	529	—	1129
Whangarei Primary School	1–6	Whangārei	State	464 (average)	473		1130
Whangaruru School	1–8	Whangaruru	State	559 (most)	38	—	1667
Whau Valley School	1–6	Whau Valley	State	537 (most)	314		1131

== Kaipara ==
The Kaipara District is based around the northern reaches of the Kaipara Harbour and includes Dargaville, Ruawai and Maungaturoto.

Name	Years	Area	Authority	Decile	Roll	Website	MOE
Aranga School	1–8	Aranga	State	534 (most)	17		1001
Arapohue School	1–8	Arapohue	State	502 (many)	35	—	1002
Dargaville High School	9–15	Dargaville	State	515 (many)	405	—	19
Dargaville Intermediate	7–8	Dargaville	State	514 (many)	169		1008
Dargaville Primary School	1–6	Dargaville	State	492 (above average)	401		1009
Kaihu Valley School	1–8	Kaihu	State	563 (most)	13	—	1020
Kaiwaka School	1–6	Kaiwaka	State	482 (above average)	133	—	1027
Mangawhai Beach School	1–8	Mangawhai	State	430 (below average)	710		1038
Matakohe School	1–8	Matakohe	State	515 (many)	35	—	1042
Maungaturoto School	1–6	Maungaturoto	State	477 (above average)	195	—	1049
Otamatea Christian School	1–15	Maungaturoto	Private	n/a	50		283
Otamatea High School	7–13	Maungaturoto	State	480 (above average)	573		21
Paparoa School	1–6	Paparoa	State	468 (average)	44	—	1077
Pouto School	1–8	Pouto Peninsula	State	521 (many)	12	—	1085
Ruawai College	7–13	Ruawai	State	526 (most)	145		22
Ruawai School	1–6	Ruawai	State	501 (many)	96	—	1095
Selwyn Park School	1–6	Dargaville	State	542 (most)	143	—	1097
St Josephs School	1–8	Dargaville	State integrated	484 (above average)	96		1098
Tangiteroria School	1–8	Tangiteroria	State	485 (above average)	34		1104
Tangowahine School	1–8	Tangowahine	State	513 (many)	13	—	1105
Te Kopuru School	1–8	Te Kōpuru	State	519 (many)	85	—	1111
Tinopai School	1–8	Tinopai	State	534 (most)	19		1114
TKKM o Ngaringaomatariki	1–8	Oruawharo	State	524 (most)	93	—	600

== See also ==
- Closed schools in the Northland region
