= Graham Latimer =

New Zealand Māori leader (1926-2016)

Sir Graham Latimer KBE

Chair of the New Zealand Māori Council
- In office 1973–2013

Personal details
- Born: Graham Stanley Latimer; 7 February 1926 Waiharara, New Zealand
- Died: 7 July 2016 (aged 90) Pamapuria, New Zealand
- Party: National
- Spouse: Emily Moore (m. 1948; died 2015)
- Children: 5

Sir Graham Stanley Latimer KBE (7 February 1926 – 7 June 2016) was a New Zealand Māori leader, chosen in the late 1960s to be a new leader to resolve Māori grievances. He was a member of the New Zealand Māori Council from 1964, and president from 1973. In 1987 he initiated a successful appeal against the State-Owned Enterprises Act leading to actions against the Crown relating to land, forests, fisheries and te reo Māori (mortgaging his farm at Taipuha for the expenses).

== Biography ==
Latimer was born on the Aupouri Peninsula south of Te Kao in Northland, then a depressed area. His mother, Lillian, was Irish-Scottish and his father, Graham, of mixed Anglo-Saxon and Māori ancestry; he was their third son. As well as being a Pākehā–Māori marriage, the bride was Catholic and the groom Anglican, so the couple married in the local police station. The family lived at Pamapuria seven kilometres from Kaitaia. Latimer attended three primary schools, and then went to Kaitaia District High School. He left after two weeks, as he was needed to help hand-milk the small family herd of 14 dairy cows on 48 acres. When the herd was sold because of disputes within his whānau (extended family), he worked on other farms. He enlisted in the Army in 1943, and went to Japan in 1946–47 in Jayforce as part of the army of occupation.

In 1948, Latimer married Emily Moore; the couple would have five children over their own and were parents to more than 20 other children through whāngai adoption. Latimer worked for the New Zealand Railways until 1961, becoming stationmaster at Kaiwaka in 1952. From 1961 he was a farmer on the Kaipara Harbour; to 1979 at Tinopai and from 1979 to 1995 at Taipuha. In 1995 he returned to Pamapuria.

Latimer was made a spokesman for Ngāti Whātua (though his own hapū is Ngāti Kahu from the Aupouri Peninsula) and a Māori warden in 1956. In 1963 he was elected to the Tai Tokerau District Māori Council in 1963 and one of three members representing te Tai Tokerau on the New Zealand Māori Council 1964. On the New Zealand Māori Council he was vice-president 1969 and president from 1973. In 1977 he was appointed one of the first three members of the Waitangi Tribunal. He was chairman of the Crown Forestry Rental Trust from 1990, and a member of the Treaty of Waitangi Fisheries Commission between 1993 and 1998. He retrieved tūpuna Māori from an English auction house in 1988, and stopped the public sale of human remains.

Latimer was active in other organisations, the Anglican General Synod, on the board of the Museum of New Zealand Te Papa Tongarewa, a member of the Alcoholic Liquor Advisory Council and was a director of several commercial enterprises. He was a member of the National Party, and was Māori vice-president from 1981 to 1992. He stood in the Northern Maori electorate in 1969 and 1972, coming second for National both times.

Latimer died on 7 June 2016, at the age of 90, after developing Parkinson's disease. He had been predeceased by his wife, Emily, Lady Latimer, the previous year.

== Honours and awards ==
Latimer was awarded the Queen Elizabeth II Silver Jubilee Medal in 1977. In the 1980 Queen's Birthday Honours, he was appointed a Knight Commander of the Order of the British Empire. In 1990, he received the New Zealand 1990 Commemoration Medal.

Latimer's wife, Emily, Lady Latimer, was awarded both the New Zealand 1990 Commemoration Medal and the New Zealand Suffrage Centennial Medal 1993.
