= Lake Kihona =

- Location within Northland Region
- Location: Northland Region, North Island
- Coordinates: 34.6300°S 172.9067°E
- Type: Dune lake
- Primary outflows: Pukekura Stream
- Basin countries: New Zealand
- Surface area: 7.8 hectares (19 acres)
- Max. depth: 8.3 metres (27 ft)

Lake Kihona is a dune lake in the Northland Region of New Zealand. It is located to the northwest of Te Kao on the Aupouri Peninsula.

The lake was formed from a gully system dammed by sand dunes to the west. There is an inflow stream on the northeastern side of the lake, and the lake discharges to Ninety Mile Beach on the west coast via Pukekura Stream.

The catchment is predominantly pine forestry, with a manuka scrub buffer on the northern side of the lake.

== See also ==
- List of lakes in New Zealand
