= Kaingaroa =

Kaingaroa may refer to several places in New Zealand:

- Kaingaroa, Bay of Plenty, a settlement that is also called Kaingaroa Village or Kaingaroa Forest
- Kaingaroa, Chatham Island, a village on Chatham Island
- Kaingaroa, Northland
- Kaingaroa Forest, a forest in the central North Island
