= Pukenui School =

Pukenui School may refer to:

- Pukenui School in Pukenui, Northland Region
- Pukenui School in Te Kūiti, Waikato Region
