= Pamapuria school sexual abuse cases =

The Pamapuria School Sexual Abuse Cases were cases of child sex abuse perpetrated by the teacher and deputy principal of Pamapuria School, James Parker, between 1999 and 2012. Parker's offending at the small school near the town of Kaitaia made national headlines in New Zealand after his arrest in August 2012. 74 charges were laid spanning a period of offending of 13 years, potentially making Parker New Zealand's most prolific child sex offender.

== Sexual offending ==
Initial concerns were raised about Parker during his work as a student-teacher at Oturu School in 1999 due to issues with his professional boundaries with students. However, no charges were laid against him. Ms Lovatt-Davis, the principal of Oturu school, refused to support Parker's application to become a fully registered teacher due to her concerns about him taking students to his home where his girlfriend noted he would leave the couple's bed to sleep alongside the children “marae style”. Lovatt-Davis warned the principal of Pamapuria School, Mr Hovell, that Parker had taken students onto a marae with him at night, however Hovell believed these concerns were based in violation of Maori cultural practices and not related to sexual offending.

Parker commenced work at Pamapuria school, where he was fully registered as a teacher under the recommendation of Hovell. The bulk of Parker's offending occurred between 2006 and 2012 with Parker abusing pupils aged between 8 and 15. This abuse ranged from touching the boys’ genitals to sexual intercourse on two occasions. Despite this, Parker was able to maintain a positive image of himself in the Kaitaia community, being well-loved for his skill on the guitar (with which he led a kapa haka group for children) and his close friendships with parents and families of his pupils, thus leading to claims of abuse being dismissed by the families of his victims.

== Arrest and trial ==
In 2009, police investigated complaints from two victims about Parker's offending, however during a second interview the victims retracted their allegations and no charges were laid. In light of this, police sent a letter to the school urging that Parker's habit of taking children to his home was inappropriate and of concern. No further action was taken by the school.

Parker continued to target children from vulnerable, impoverished and typically Maori backgrounds at his isolated farm house in Ahipara under the guise of teaching them, only to sexually abuse them. He also slept alongside students during school camps, with one student spotted wearing Parker's underwear one morning. In 2012, one boy came forward to make accusations against Parker to the police, after which he was arrested and put on trial.

Parker initially pleaded guilty to 49 charges of sexual abuse in August 2012, however during the course of police investigations more charges were laid. In April 2013, Parker pleaded guilty to a further 25 offences. These charges included 25 charges of indecent acts with boys under the age of 12 years, 35 of indecent acts on boys aged between 12 and 16 years, four of sexual connection with a child under the age of 12 years, five of sexual connection with a young person aged between 12 and 16 years and five of sexual violation. During his trial, Parker infamously stated that “Those of you who know me well will know that I am not the monster that many will portray me to be.”

Justice Paul Heath sentenced Parker to seven years preventive detention, citing Parker's need for treatment as a factor in relatively short length of the sentence.

== Aftermath ==
Whilst under arrest, the New Zealand Teachers’ Council did not deregister Parker, instead of waiting until his sentencing to permanently cancel his registration as a teacher.

As a consequence of his failure to act on allegations of Parkers’ offending in 2009 and the concerns other teachers had regarding his conduct with pupils, along with the mismanagement of the school which allowed for Parkers’ offending, Pamapuria School principal Hovell was found to have committed misconduct on the grounds of neglect and asked not to renew his registration as a teacher. The school was subsequently put under the control of a New Zealand Ministry of Education commission and the board of trustees for the school resigned.

On the 29th of November, 2023 James Parker was denied parole for the second time at Rolleston prison, where he is currently serving his sentence. It was revealed that Parker has been working as a janitor in the administration building of the prison and has participated in some controlled releases, but still poses a risk to the community. He will next be eligible for parole in September 2024.

In May 2025, Parker again applied for parole albeit unsuccessfully. It was agreed his eventual release would be in the South Island where he could pursue his dream of working outdoors growing plants or caring for animals. That June, it was reported that further victims of Parker had come forward, adding to 300 known criminal acts. Parker's additional offending involved using a taser to force two young boys to do as he instructed while sexually violating them. The presiding judge described his behaviour as having a "sadistic flavour." Thus, despite being described as on the verge of release and after four failed attempts at parole, these further crimes resulted in an increase in his sentence.
