= Tutukaka =

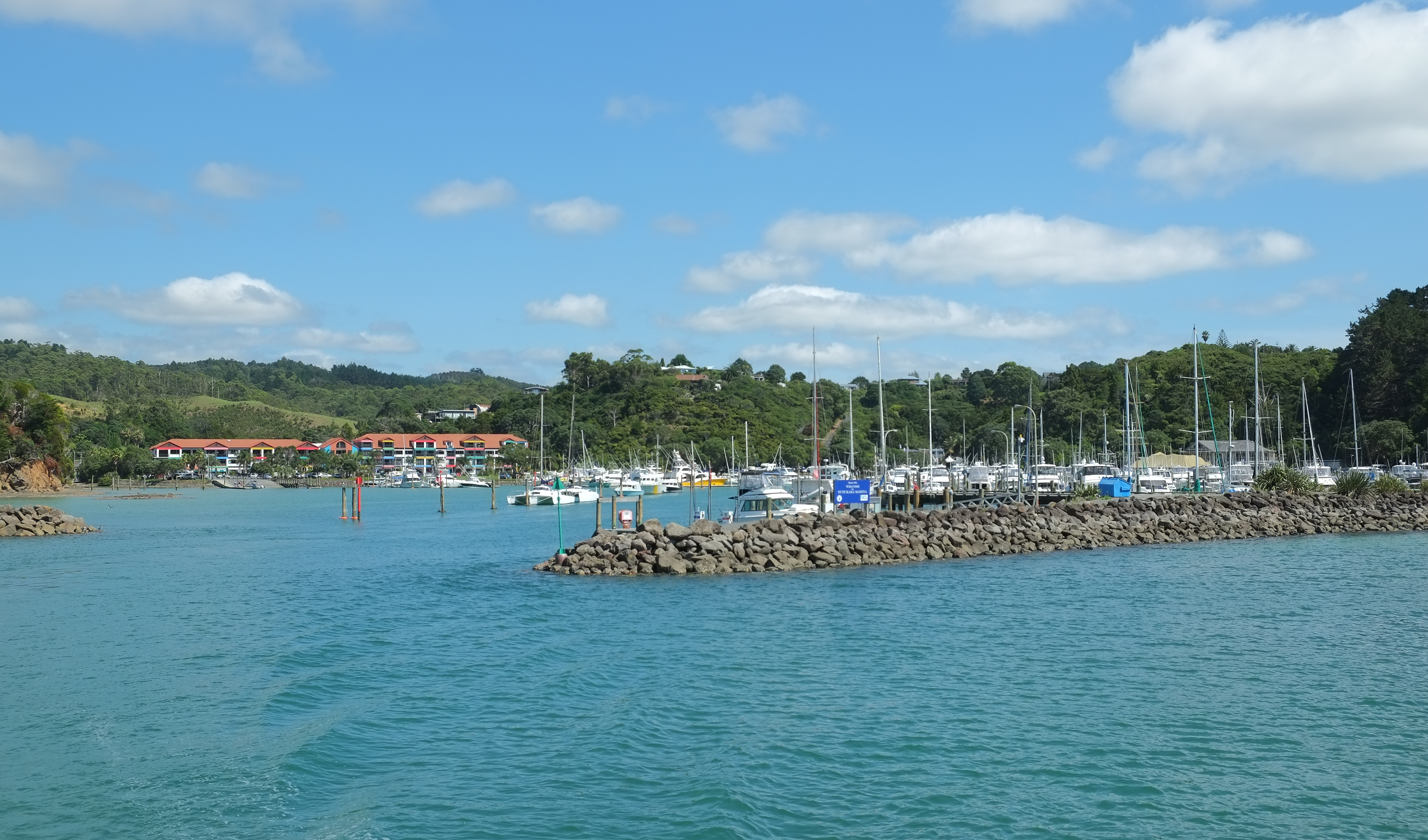
- Tutukaka marina
- Interactive map of Tutukaka
- Coordinates: 35°36′38″S 174°31′28″E
- Country: New Zealand
- Region: Northland Region
- District: Whangarei District
- Ward: Hikurangi-Coastal Ward
- Electorates: Whangārei; Te Tai Tokerau

Government
  - Territorial Authority: Whangarei District Council
  - Regional council: Northland Regional Council
  - Mayor of Whangārei: Ken Couper
  - Whangārei MP: Shane Reti
  - Te Tai Tokerau MP: Mariameno Kapa-Kingi

Area
  - Total: 6.98 km^{2} (2.69 sq mi)

Population (June 2025)
  - Total: 830
  - Density: 120/km^{2} (310/sq mi)

Tutukaka (Māori: Tūtūkākā) is a locality on the east coast of Northland, New Zealand, in an area commonly referred to as the Tutukaka Coast which includes Ngunguru and Matapouri. The city of Whangārei is to the southwest. The residential areas of Tutukaka fringe the hills surrounding Tutukaka Harbour, which has a history as a local fishing port and hosts the Tutukaka marina. The Māori name comes from the term tūtū kākā, which means a parrot (kākā) snaring tree (tūtū).

As the closest marina to the Poor Knights Islands, Tutukaka is the base for boat tours for diving and snorkelling in the waters around these protected marine reserve islands. At the peak of the busy summer months, the population of Tutukaka swells from around 600 permanent residents to over 2,400. A walking track leads from Tutukaka to a small lighthouse at Tutukaka Head (South Gable).

== Demographics ==
Statistics New Zealand describes Tutukaka as a rural settlement. The settlement covers 6.98 km^{2} (2.69 sq mi) and had an estimated population of 830 as of June 2025, with a population density of 119 people per km^{2}. The settlement is part of the larger Matapouri-Tutukaka statistical area.

Historical population
Year	Pop.	±% p.a.
2006	519	—
2013	606	+2.24%
2018	732	+3.85%
2023	798	+1.74%

Tutukaka had a population of 798 in the 2023 New Zealand census, an increase of 66 people (9.0%) since the 2018 census, and an increase of 192 people (31.7%) since the 2013 census. There were 396 males and 405 females in 357 dwellings. 0.4% of people identified as LGBTIQ+. The median age was 54.6 years (compared with 38.1 years nationally). There were 102 people (12.8%) aged under 15 years, 87 (10.9%) aged 15 to 29, 390 (48.9%) aged 30 to 64, and 225 (28.2%) aged 65 or older.

People could identify as more than one ethnicity. The results were 91.7% European (Pākehā); 14.7% Māori; 1.1% Pasifika; 2.6% Asian; 1.1% Middle Eastern, Latin American and African New Zealanders (MELAA); and 2.3% other, which includes people giving their ethnicity as "New Zealander". English was spoken by 98.5%, Māori language by 3.4%, and other languages by 9.8%. No language could be spoken by 1.5% (e.g. too young to talk). The percentage of people born overseas was 23.3, compared with 28.8% nationally.

Religious affiliations were 27.8% Christian, 0.4% Hindu, 0.8% New Age, and 1.1% other religions. People who answered that they had no religion were 62.0%, and 7.5% of people did not answer the census question.

Of those at least 15 years old, 177 (25.4%) people had a bachelor's or higher degree, 363 (52.2%) had a post-high school certificate or diploma, and 99 (14.2%) people exclusively held high school qualifications. The median income was $42,700, compared with $41,500 nationally. 108 people (15.5%) earned over $100,000 compared to 12.1% nationally. The employment status of those at least 15 was that 300 (43.1%) people were employed full-time, 135 (19.4%) were part-time, and 6 (0.9%) were unemployed.
