= Ngunguru River =

Coordinates: 35°38′S 174°31′E

Location
- Country: New Zealand

Physical characteristics
- Mouth
  - location: Ngunguru Bay
- Length: 23 km (14 mi)

The Ngunguru River is a river of the Northland Region of New Zealand's North Island. It initially flows southwest before turning east to flow into a long, wide estuary which empties into Ngunguru Bay to the northwest of Whangārei. The town of Ngunguru sits on the estuary's north bank at its opening to the bay.

== See also ==
- List of rivers of New Zealand
