= Maungakaramea =

- Interactive map of Maungakaramea
- Coordinates: 35°50′38″S 174°12′15″E
- Country: New Zealand
- Region: Northland Region
- District: Whangarei District
- Ward: Bream Bay Ward
- Electorates: Northland; Te Tai Tokerau

Government
  - Territorial Authority: Whangarei District Council
  - Regional council: Northland Regional Council
  - Mayor of Whangārei: Ken Couper
  - Northland MP: Grant McCallum
  - Te Tai Tokerau MP: Mariameno Kapa-Kingi

Area
  - Total: 1.00 km^{2} (0.39 sq mi)

Population (June 2025)
  - Total: 310
  - Density: 310/km^{2} (800/sq mi)

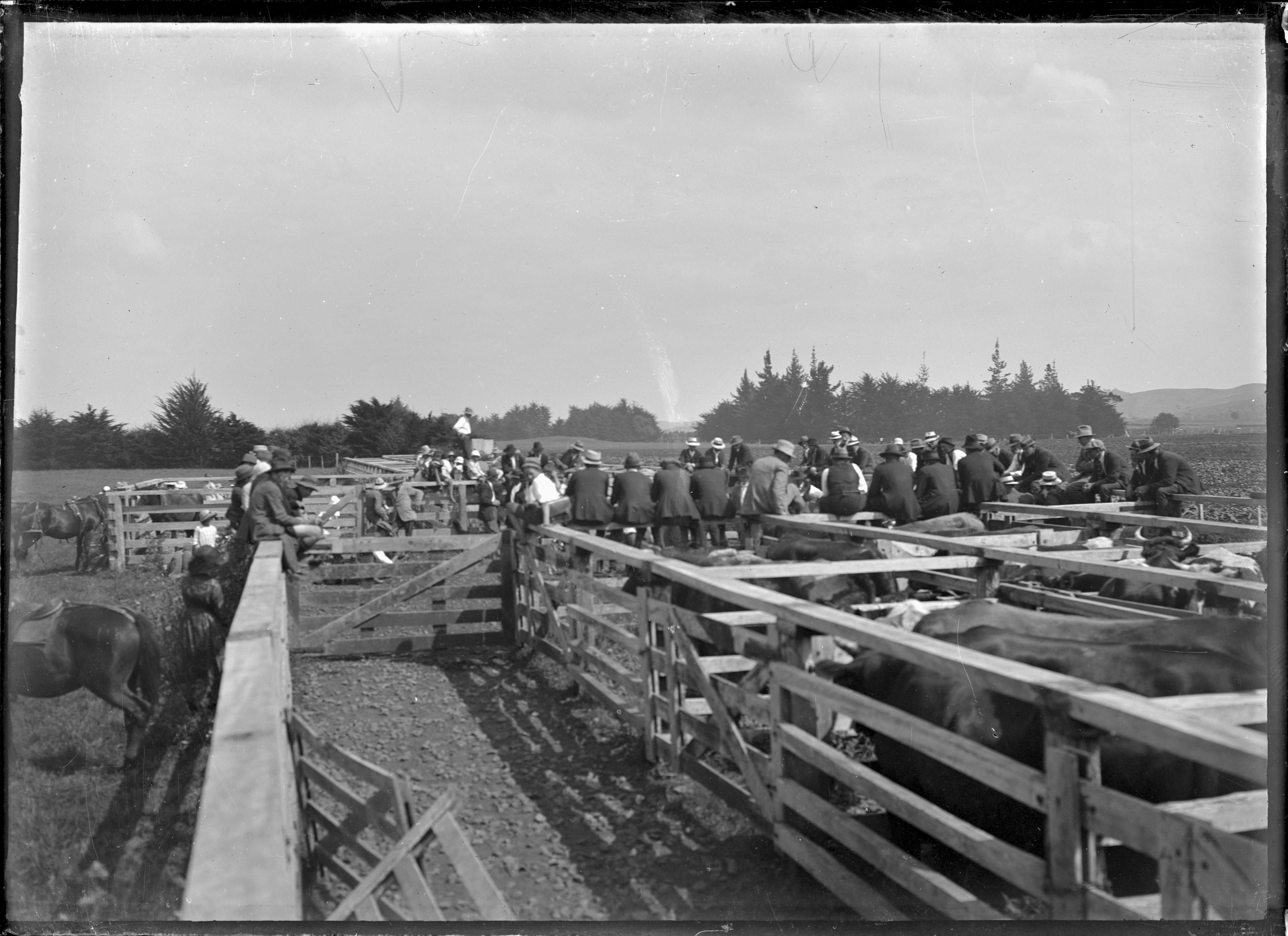
View of farmers at a cattle market at the Maungakaramea saleyards. Photograph taken by Albert Percy Godber in 1923.

Maungakaramea is a locality in Northland, New Zealand. Whangārei is to the northeast.

Local features include Tangihua Forest, Maungakaramea Sports Club and Mid Western Rugby Club.

== History and culture ==
The name Maungakaramea was given to the area by local Māori. There are two interpretations of the meaning of the name, one is that "Karamea" means speargrass (Aciphylla), hence the "speargrass mountain", the other is that Karamea is a coloured clay of a reddish type used for war paint on the face and body. A safe interpretation is "Red Ochre Mountain".

The area from Whangārei to Waipu, Waihonga and Tangihua, was taken from Ngaitahuhu by a Ngapuhi chief, Te Ponaharakeke, who joined with Te Ngarokiteuru to drive all the Ngaitahuhu out in the mid-18th century.

The first record of a European settler in the Maungakaramea area was in 1820 when the Reverend Samuel Marsden encountered a Māori tribe whilst travelling overland via the Kaipara Harbour.

The Maungakaramea blocks were purchased by the government in 1855.

The Eastern part of the Maungakaramea Block (now part of Mangapai) was opened for sale in April 1857, but the area now considered Maungakaramea was not open to selection until May 1859.

Amongst the early settlers were two brothers, Henry Spear Wilson and Daniel Cook Wilson. Also, Jonathan Wigmore Sherlock and his wife Ann arrived in 1859 from Ireland, and took out land orders for 78 acres, being Lots 59 and 60, on 2 May 1859 – the first day this area was open for selection.

The local Maungārongo Marae and meeting house are a traditional meeting place for the Ngāpuhi hapū of Ngāti Hine, Ngāti Te Rino, Te Parawhau and Te Uriroroi.

== Demographics ==
Statistics New Zealand describes Maungakaramea as a rural settlement. The settlement covers 1.00 km^{2} (0.39 sq mi) and had an estimated population of 310 as of June 2025, with a population density of 310 people per km^{2}. The settlement is part of the larger Oakleigh-Mangapai statistical area.

Historical population for Maungakaramea
Year	Pop.	±% p.a.
2006	261	—
2013	306	+2.30%
2018	282	−1.62%
2023	300	+1.25%
The 2006 population is for a smaller area of 0.86 km^{2} Source:

Maungakaramea had a population of 300 in the 2023 New Zealand census, an increase of 18 people (6.4%) since the 2018 census, and a decrease of 6 people (−2.0%) since the 2013 census. There were 147 males, 153 females and 3 people of other genders in 129 dwellings. 3.0% of people identified as LGBTIQ+. The median age was 51.9 years (compared with 38.1 years nationally). There were 51 people (17.0%) aged under 15 years, 33 (11.0%) aged 15 to 29, 129 (43.0%) aged 30 to 64, and 90 (30.0%) aged 65 or older.

People could identify as more than one ethnicity. The results were 92.0% European (Pākehā), 18.0% Māori, 1.0% Pasifika, 5.0% Asian, and 4.0% other, which includes people giving their ethnicity as "New Zealander". English was spoken by 97.0%, Māori language by 4.0%, and other languages by 6.0%. No language could be spoken by 1.0% (e.g. too young to talk). New Zealand Sign Language was known by 1.0%. The percentage of people born overseas was 19.0, compared with 28.8% nationally.

The only religious affiliation was 25.0% Christian. People who answered that they had no religion were 66.0%, and 9.0% of people did not answer the census question.

Of those at least 15 years old, 33 (13.3%) people had a bachelor's or higher degree, 147 (59.0%) had a post-high school certificate or diploma, and 48 (19.3%) people exclusively held high school qualifications. The median income was $32,600, compared with $41,500 nationally. 18 people (7.2%) earned over $100,000 compared to 12.1% nationally. The employment status of those at least 15 was that 108 (43.4%) people were employed full-time, 24 (9.6%) were part-time, and 6 (2.4%) were unemployed.

=== Oakleigh-Mangapai statistical area ===
Oakleigh-Mangapai statistical area, which also includes Oakleigh, Tauraroa and Waiotira, covers 323.77 km^{2} (125.01 sq mi) and had an estimated population of 2,460 as of June 2025, with a population density of 7.6 people per km^{2}.

Historical population for Oakleigh-Mangapai
Year	Pop.	±% p.a.
2006	2,007	—
2013	2,205	+1.35%
2018	2,310	+0.93%
2023	2,409	+0.84%

Oakleigh-Mangapai had a population of 2,409 in the 2023 New Zealand census, an increase of 99 people (4.3%) since the 2018 census, and an increase of 204 people (9.3%) since the 2013 census. There were 1,215 males, 1,185 females and 9 people of other genders in 897 dwellings. 2.1% of people identified as LGBTIQ+. The median age was 44.3 years (compared with 38.1 years nationally). There were 471 people (19.6%) aged under 15 years, 333 (13.8%) aged 15 to 29, 1,140 (47.3%) aged 30 to 64, and 468 (19.4%) aged 65 or older.

People could identify as more than one ethnicity. The results were 91.0% European (Pākehā); 18.6% Māori; 2.5% Pasifika; 2.1% Asian; 0.4% Middle Eastern, Latin American and African New Zealanders (MELAA); and 3.6% other, which includes people giving their ethnicity as "New Zealander". English was spoken by 97.8%, Māori language by 3.0%, Samoan by 0.1%, and other languages by 4.7%. No language could be spoken by 2.0% (e.g. too young to talk). New Zealand Sign Language was known by 0.2%. The percentage of people born overseas was 14.8, compared with 28.8% nationally.

Religious affiliations were 21.2% Christian, 0.1% Hindu, 0.1% Islam, 0.7% Māori religious beliefs, 0.2% Buddhist, 0.7% New Age, 0.1% Jewish, and 0.9% other religions. People who answered that they had no religion were 67.6%, and 8.5% of people did not answer the census question.

Of those at least 15 years old, 240 (12.4%) people had a bachelor's or higher degree, 1,182 (61.0%) had a post-high school certificate or diploma, and 429 (22.1%) people exclusively held high school qualifications. The median income was $42,600, compared with $41,500 nationally. 177 people (9.1%) earned over $100,000 compared to 12.1% nationally. The employment status of those at least 15 was that 1,032 (53.3%) people were employed full-time, 276 (14.2%) were part-time, and 45 (2.3%) were unemployed.

== Education ==
Maungakaramea School is a coeducational full primary (years 1-8) school with a roll of 113 students as of March 2026. The school celebrated its 125th reunion in 2000.

== Geology ==
Maungakaramea is a basaltic volcano that raises to a height of 225 m (738 ft) in country side typical of the Northland Allochthon.
