= Kiripaka =

Settlement in New Zealand

- Interactive map of Kiripaka
- Coordinates: 35.644°S 174.429°E
- Country: New Zealand
- Region: Northland Region
- District: Whangarei District
- Ward: Whangarei Heads Ward
- Electorates: Whangārei; Te Tai Tokerau

Government
  - Territorial Authority: Whangarei District Council
  - Regional council: Northland Regional Council
  - Mayor of Whangārei: Ken Couper
  - Whangārei MP: Shane Reti
  - Te Tai Tokerau MP: Mariameno Kapa-Kingi

Kiripaka is a locality in Northland, New Zealand. The settlement of Glenbervie lies to the southwest, and Ngunguru is to the northeast.

"Kiripaka" means flint, schist or asbestos in the Māori language.

== Demographics ==
Kiripaka statistical area covers 72.02 km^{2} (27.81 sq mi) and had an estimated population of 1,180 as of June 2025, with a population density of 16.4 people per km^{2}.

Historical population
Year	Pop.	±% p.a.
2006	717	—
2013	888	+3.10%
2018	993	+2.26%
2023	1,107	+2.20%

Kiripaka statistical area had a population of 1,107 in the 2023 New Zealand census, an increase of 114 people (11.5%) since the 2018 census, and an increase of 219 people (24.7%) since the 2013 census. There were 519 males and 588 females in 357 dwellings. 1.6% of people identified as LGBTIQ+. The median age was 42.9 years (compared with 38.1 years nationally). There were 234 people (21.1%) aged under 15 years, 156 (14.1%) aged 15 to 29, 528 (47.7%) aged 30 to 64, and 189 (17.1%) aged 65 or older.

People could identify as more than one ethnicity. The results were 82.4% European (Pākehā); 25.7% Māori; 3.5% Pasifika; 2.4% Asian; 0.3% Middle Eastern, Latin American and African New Zealanders (MELAA); and 2.2% other, which includes people giving their ethnicity as "New Zealander". English was spoken by 98.6%, Māori language by 6.5%, and other languages by 7.0%. No language could be spoken by 0.8% (e.g. too young to talk). New Zealand Sign Language was known by 0.5%. The percentage of people born overseas was 13.8, compared with 28.8% nationally.

Religious affiliations were 26.0% Christian, 2.4% Māori religious beliefs, 0.5% Buddhist, 0.5% New Age, and 1.1% other religions. People who answered that they had no religion were 63.4%, and 6.5% of people did not answer the census question.

Of those at least 15 years old, 147 (16.8%) people had a bachelor's or higher degree, 489 (56.0%) had a post-high school certificate or diploma, and 177 (20.3%) people exclusively held high school qualifications. The median income was $39,900, compared with $41,500 nationally. 117 people (13.4%) earned over $100,000 compared to 12.1% nationally. The employment status of those at least 15 was that 417 (47.8%) people were employed full-time, 129 (14.8%) were part-time, and 27 (3.1%) were unemployed.

== Mining ==
A coal mine was opened at Kiripaka in 1893 and produced "first-class steam coal". A second mine was opened across the river in 1899. One of the mines closed in late 1904, as it was no longer profitable. The remaining mine was closed in 1912 in response to miners taking a day off to support the Waihi miners' strike. The mine reopened at the end of 1914 although coal output didn't begin until August 1915. After industrial disputes and flooding, the mine closed permanently in June 1921 although fire clay was extracted from 1923 and there was some further coal mining at the end of the decade.
