= Glenbervie, New Zealand =

Glenbervie
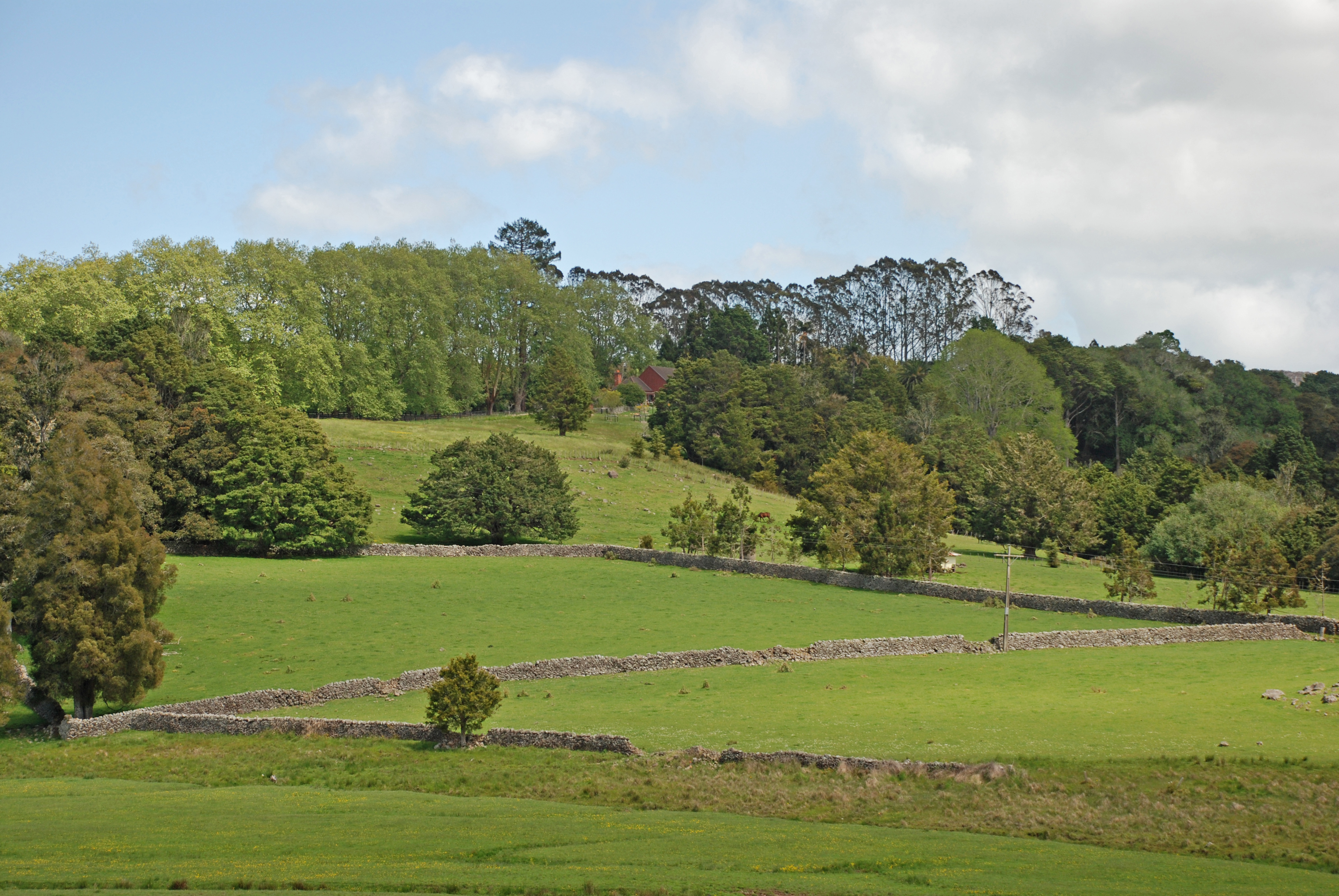
- Stone walls near Glenbervie
- Interactive map of Glenbervie
- Coordinates: 35°40′32″S 174°20′59″E
- Country: New Zealand
- Region: Northland Region
- District: Whangarei District
- Ward: Hikurangi-Coastal Ward
- Electorates: Whangārei; Te Tai Tokerau

Government
  - Territorial Authority: Whangarei District Council
  - Regional council: Northland Regional Council
  - Mayor of Whangārei: Ken Couper
  - Whangārei MP: Shane Reti
  - Te Tai Tokerau MP: Mariameno Kapa-Kingi

Glenbervie is a settlement in Northland, New Zealand. The city of Whangārei lies to the southwest, and the localities of Kiripaka and Ngunguru to the northeast. The Glenbervie Forest is north of the settlement.

== Demographics ==
The statistical area of Abbey Caves-Glenbervie, which includes Mount Parihaka, covers 32.11 km^{2} (12.40 sq mi) and had an estimated population of 1,520 as of June 2025, with a population density of 47 people per km^{2}.

Most residents of Glenbervie live on lifestyle properties, which are loosely defined as semi-rural properties of around 4 hectares. The remaining 19% live in residential housing.

Historical population
Year	Pop.	±% p.a.
2006	1,002	—
2013	1,137	+1.82%
2018	1,329	+3.17%
2023	1,416	+1.28%

Abbey Caves-Glenbervie had a population of 1,416 in the 2023 New Zealand census, an increase of 87 people (6.5%) since the 2018 census, and an increase of 279 people (24.5%) since the 2013 census. There were 720 males, 693 females and 3 people of other genders in 495 dwellings. 1.7% of people identified as LGBTIQ+. The median age was 47.0 years (compared with 38.1 years nationally). There were 255 people (18.0%) aged under 15 years, 201 (14.2%) aged 15 to 29, 669 (47.2%) aged 30 to 64, and 288 (20.3%) aged 65 or older.

People could identify as more than one ethnicity. The results were 90.9% European (Pākehā); 19.7% Māori; 2.8% Pasifika; 3.6% Asian; 0.2% Middle Eastern, Latin American and African New Zealanders (MELAA); and 1.9% other, which includes people giving their ethnicity as "New Zealander". English was spoken by 98.5%, Māori language by 3.0%, Samoan by 0.2%, and other languages by 6.6%. No language could be spoken by 1.1% (e.g. too young to talk). New Zealand Sign Language was known by 0.4%. The percentage of people born overseas was 18.4, compared with 28.8% nationally.

Religious affiliations were 30.1% Christian, 0.4% Hindu, 0.6% Māori religious beliefs, 0.4% Buddhist, 0.4% New Age, and 0.8% other religions. People who answered that they had no religion were 60.6%, and 7.0% of people did not answer the census question.

Of those at least 15 years old, 207 (17.8%) people had a bachelor's or higher degree, 684 (58.9%) had a post-high school certificate or diploma, and 201 (17.3%) people exclusively held high school qualifications. The median income was $42,100, compared with $41,500 nationally. 159 people (13.7%) earned over $100,000 compared to 12.1% nationally. The employment status of those at least 15 was that 594 (51.2%) people were employed full-time, 171 (14.7%) were part-time, and 24 (2.1%) were unemployed.

== History and culture ==
The local Pehiaweri Marae and Te Reo o te Iwi meeting house are a traditional meeting ground of the Ngāpuhi hapū of Ngāti Hao, Ngāti Hau, Te Parawhau and Te Uriroroi.

== Education ==
Glenbervie School is a coeducational contributing primary (years 1–6) school with a roll of 225 students as of July 2026. The school was established in 1893.

== Climate ==
Climate data for Glenbervie (1981–2010 normals, extremes 1947–1987)
Month	Jan	Feb	Mar	Apr	May	Jun	Jul	Aug	Sep	Oct	Nov	Dec	Year
Record high °C (°F)	31.1 (88.0)	29.9 (85.8)	29.4 (84.9)	25.3 (77.5)	23.9 (75.0)	21.4 (70.5)	19.4 (66.9)	20.6 (69.1)	22.4 (72.3)	26.8 (80.2)	29.2 (84.6)	32.8 (91.0)	32.8 (91.0)
Mean daily maximum °C (°F)	23.8 (74.8)	23.6 (74.5)	22.5 (72.5)	19.8 (67.6)	17.8 (64.0)	15.7 (60.3)	14.8 (58.6)	15.3 (59.5)	16.7 (62.1)	18.2 (64.8)	19.9 (67.8)	22.1 (71.8)	19.2 (66.5)
Daily mean °C (°F)	18.2 (64.8)	18.5 (65.3)	17.2 (63.0)	14.6 (58.3)	13.0 (55.4)	10.4 (50.7)	9.7 (49.5)	10.4 (50.7)	11.7 (53.1)	13.0 (55.4)	14.5 (58.1)	16.5 (61.7)	14.0 (57.2)
Mean daily minimum °C (°F)	12.5 (54.5)	13.5 (56.3)	11.9 (53.4)	9.5 (49.1)	8.2 (46.8)	5.1 (41.2)	4.7 (40.5)	5.4 (41.7)	6.8 (44.2)	7.8 (46.0)	9.2 (48.6)	10.9 (51.6)	8.8 (47.8)
Record low °C (°F)	2.2 (36.0)	2.2 (36.0)	1.1 (34.0)	−0.8 (30.6)	−4.3 (24.3)	−4.5 (23.9)	−5.6 (21.9)	−5.4 (22.3)	−5.4 (22.3)	−2.8 (27.0)	−0.1 (31.8)	1.0 (33.8)	−5.6 (21.9)
Average rainfall mm (inches)	122.3 (4.81)	152.8 (6.02)	180.5 (7.11)	146.0 (5.75)	127.0 (5.00)	163.1 (6.42)	142.9 (5.63)	141.0 (5.55)	162.3 (6.39)	117.8 (4.64)	114.1 (4.49)	139.1 (5.48)	1,708.9 (67.29)
Source: NIWA
