= Tauraroa =

- Location within Northland Region
- Coordinates: 35°52′23″S 174°13′46″E
- Country: New Zealand
- Region: Northland Region
- District: Whangarei District

Tauraroa is a locality in Northland, New Zealand. Whangārei is to the northeast. Maungakaramea is about 5 km northwest. Waiotira is about 9 km southwest. The North Auckland railway line passes through Tauraroa, and the Tauraroa River flows past.

The New Zealand Ministry for Culture and Heritage gives a translation of "long rope" for Tauraroa.

== Demographics ==
Tauraroa is part of the Oakleigh-Mangapai statistical area.

== Education ==
Tauraroa Area School is a coeducational composite (years 1–13) school with a roll of 433 students as of March 2026. Before 1958, the school was "Tauraroa Public School". Between 1958 and 1983, it was "Tauraroa District High School".
