= Matapouri =

- Matapōuri
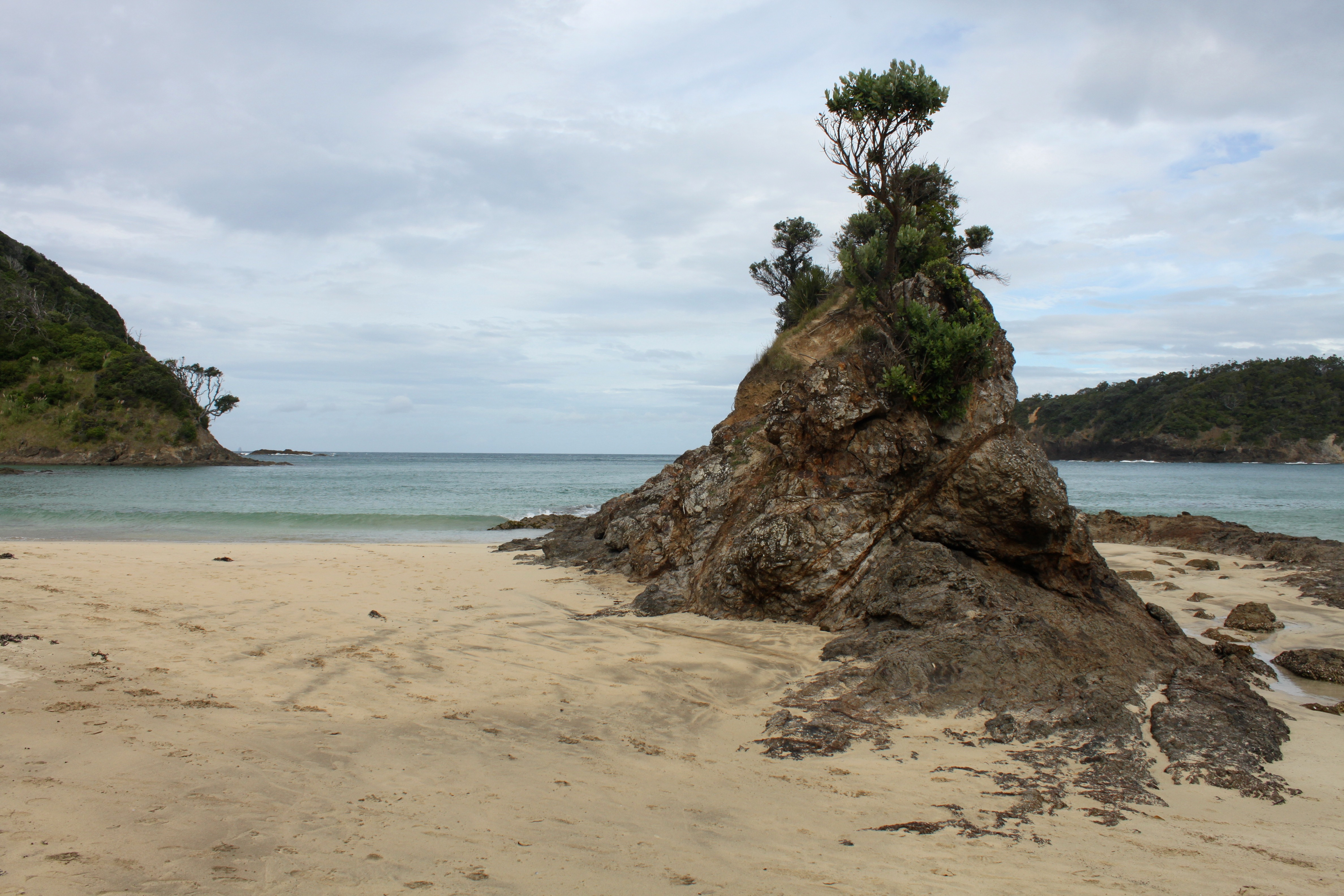
- Matapouri Bay
- Interactive map of Matapouri
- Coordinates: 35°33′55″S 174°30′15″E
- Country: New Zealand
- Region: Northland Region
- District: Whangarei District
- Ward: Hikurangi-Coastal Ward

Government
  - Territorial Authority: Whangarei District Council
  - Regional council: Northland Regional Council
  - Mayor of Whangārei: Ken Couper
  - Whangārei MP: Shane Reti
  - Te Tai Tokerau MP: Mariameno Kapa-Kingi

Area
  - Total: 1.76 km^{2} (0.68 sq mi)

Population (June 2025)
  - Total: 210
  - Density: 120/km^{2} (310/sq mi)

Matapouri (Māori: Matapōuri) is a coastal settlement in the Whangarei District of Northland, New Zealand. It is 7 kilometers north of Tutukaka and 35 km north-east of Whangārei, in an area known as the Tutukaka Coast. Matapouri was described by Whangarei District Council in 2010 as "an archetypal Kiwi bach settlement". Holiday homes make up 90 per cent of the houses and at holiday times the number of residents swells to seven times its permanent population.

== History ==
The early European settlement of Matapouri was based on the milling and transport of timber. The first school was built in 1899 and the first recorded store in 1912.

Te Wai o Te Taniwha, the Mermaid Pools, was an informal tourist attraction, but was closed indefinitely in 2019 by the local Māori authorities, Te Whanau ā Rangiwhakaahu Hapū Trust, due to visitors leaving toilet waste and rubbish.

== Demographics ==
Statistics New Zealand describes Matapōuri as a rural settlement. The settlement covers 1.76 km^{2} (0.68 sq mi) and had an estimated population of 210 as of June 2025, with a population density of 119 people per km^{2}. The settlement is part of the larger Matapouri-Tutukākā statistical area.

Historical population for Matapouri
Year	Pop.	±% p.a.
2006	144	—
2013	147	+0.29%
2018	192	+5.49%
2023	207	+1.52%

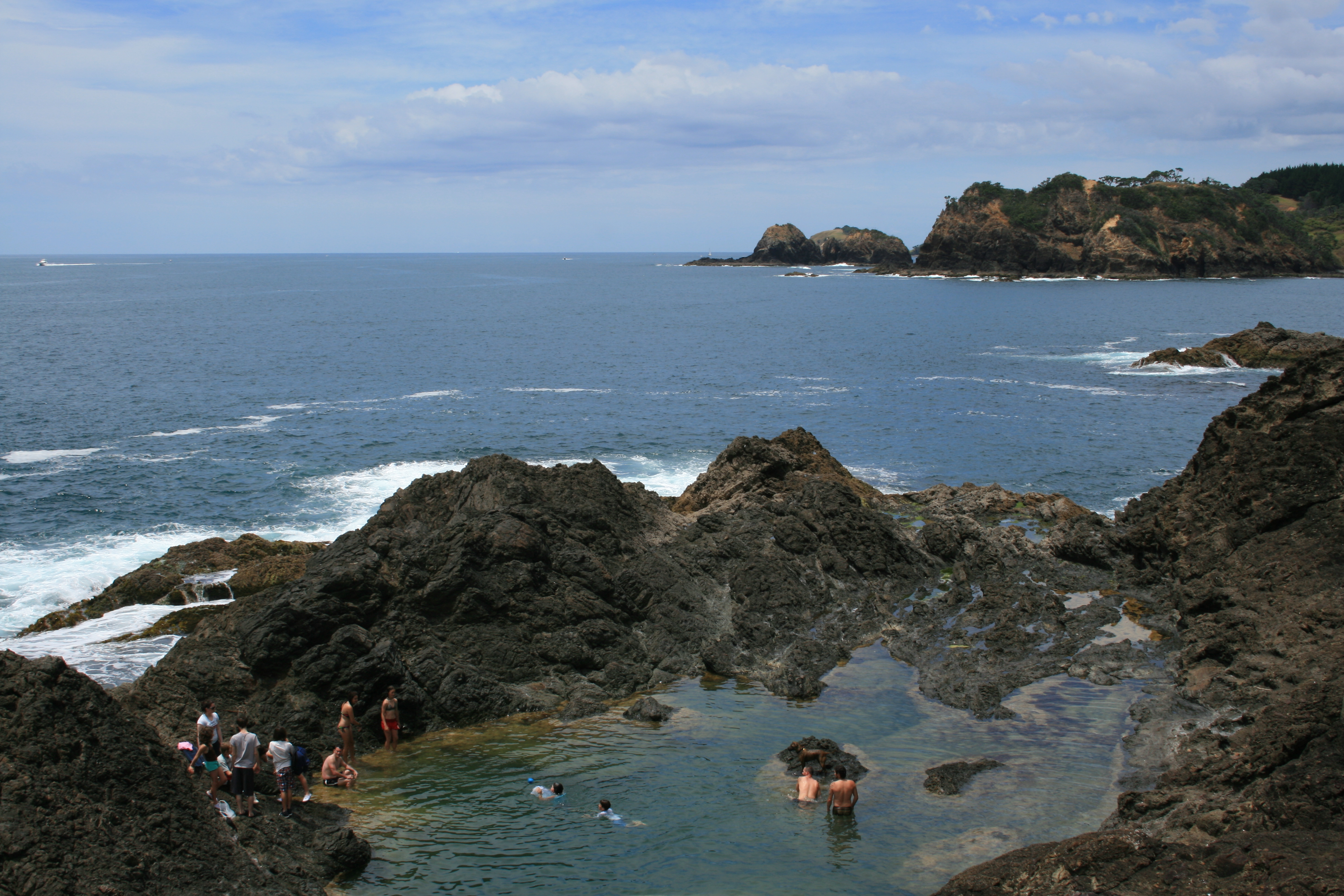
Te Wai o Te Taniwha, also called Mermaid Pool. Access closed since 2019.

Matapōuri had a population of 207 in the 2023 New Zealand census, an increase of 15 people (7.8%) since the 2018 census, and an increase of 60 people (40.8%) since the 2013 census. There were 93 males and 111 females in 102 dwellings. 1.4% of people identified as LGBTIQ+. The median age was 54.4 years (compared with 38.1 years nationally). There were 27 people (13.0%) aged under 15 years, 36 (17.4%) aged 15 to 29, 90 (43.5%) aged 30 to 64, and 57 (27.5%) aged 65 or older.

People could identify as more than one ethnicity. The results were 76.8% European (Pākehā); 37.7% Māori; 7.2% Pasifika; 1.4% Asian; 1.4% Middle Eastern, Latin American and African New Zealanders (MELAA); and 2.9% other, which includes people giving their ethnicity as "New Zealander". English was spoken by 97.1%, Māori language by 17.4%, and other languages by 4.3%. No language could be spoken by 1.4% (e.g. too young to talk). The percentage of people born overseas was 11.6, compared with 28.8% nationally.

Religious affiliations were 40.6% Christian. People who answered that they had no religion were 52.2%, and 4.3% of people did not answer the census question.

Of those at least 15 years old, 33 (18.3%) people had a bachelor's or higher degree, 96 (53.3%) had a post-high school certificate or diploma, and 36 (20.0%) people exclusively held high school qualifications. The median income was $32,000, compared with $41,500 nationally. 18 people (10.0%) earned over $100,000 compared to 12.1% nationally. The employment status of those at least 15 was that 63 (35.0%) people were employed full-time, 39 (21.7%) were part-time, and 3 (1.7%) were unemployed.

=== Matapouri-Tutukākā statistical area ===
Matapouri-Tutukākā, which also includes Tutukaka, covers 78.53 km^{2} (30.32 sq mi) and had an estimated population of 1,910 as of June 2025, with a population density of 24 people per km^{2}.

Historical population for the Matapouri-Tutukaka statistical area
Year	Pop.	±% p.a.
2006	1,203	—
2013	1,371	+1.89%
2018	1,701	+4.41%
2023	1,860	+1.80%

Matapouri-Tutukākā had a population of 1,860 in the 2023 New Zealand census, an increase of 159 people (9.3%) since the 2018 census, and an increase of 489 people (35.7%) since the 2013 census. There were 921 males and 936 females in 768 dwellings. 1.5% of people identified as LGBTIQ+. The median age was 52.1 years (compared with 38.1 years nationally). There were 267 people (14.4%) aged under 15 years, 216 (11.6%) aged 15 to 29, 903 (48.5%) aged 30 to 64, and 471 (25.3%) aged 65 or older.

People could identify as more than one ethnicity. The results were 90.5% European (Pākehā); 17.3% Māori; 2.3% Pasifika; 2.3% Asian; 1.1% Middle Eastern, Latin American and African New Zealanders (MELAA); and 3.2% other, which includes people giving their ethnicity as "New Zealander". English was spoken by 98.2%, Māori language by 4.7%, and other languages by 9.7%. No language could be spoken by 1.6% (e.g. too young to talk). The percentage of people born overseas was 22.9, compared with 28.8% nationally.

Religious affiliations were 25.0% Christian, 0.3% Hindu, 0.3% Māori religious beliefs, 0.2% Buddhist, 0.8% New Age, and 1.1% other religions. People who answered that they had no religion were 65.0%, and 7.3% of people did not answer the census question.

Of those at least 15 years old, 372 (23.4%) people had a bachelor's or higher degree, 843 (52.9%) had a post-high school certificate or diploma, and 246 (15.4%) people exclusively held high school qualifications. The median income was $37,300, compared with $41,500 nationally. 222 people (13.9%) earned over $100,000 compared to 12.1% nationally. The employment status of those at least 15 was that 654 (41.1%) people were employed full-time, 330 (20.7%) were part-time, and 21 (1.3%) were unemployed.

== Amenities ==
Matapōuri Marae is a meeting ground for Ngāti Rehua, Ngāti Toki-ki-te-Moananui of Ngātiwai, and Te Whānau a Rangiwhaakahu of Te Āki Tai. It includes Te Tokomanawa o te Aroha meeting house.

The present Matapouri Hall, based on a Keith Hay Homes design, was constructed on site in the 1970s. The hall has hosted organisations such as the Women's Institute as well as providing a place for church services, polling booths, social gatherings, New Years gala and other community events throughout the years. An earlier hall built in 1912 was demolished in 1970.
