= Umawera =

- Coordinates: 35°17′8″S 173°34′25″E
- Country: New Zealand
- Region: Northland Region
- District: Far North District

Umawera is a community in Northland, New Zealand. State Highway 1 runs through the community. Mangamuka Bridge is to the northwest, and Rangiahua is to the east. Umawera is part of the Omahuta Forest-Horeke statistical area, which covers the upper Hokianga Harbour. For demographics of this area, see Horeke.

== Climate ==
Climate data for Umawera (1970–1985 normals, extremes 1963–1985)
Month	Jan	Feb	Mar	Apr	May	Jun	Jul	Aug	Sep	Oct	Nov	Dec	Year
Record high °C (°F)	30.6 (87.1)	31.0 (87.8)	28.9 (84.0)	26.4 (79.5)	23.6 (74.5)	21.5 (70.7)	20.0 (68.0)	20.8 (69.4)	21.6 (70.9)	23.9 (75.0)	27.0 (80.6)	30.1 (86.2)	31.0 (87.8)
Mean maximum °C (°F)	28.5 (83.3)	28.4 (83.1)	27.4 (81.3)	25.2 (77.4)	21.3 (70.3)	19.8 (67.6)	18.1 (64.6)	19.2 (66.6)	20.2 (68.4)	22.1 (71.8)	24.8 (76.6)	26.6 (79.9)	29.0 (84.2)
Mean daily maximum °C (°F)	24.1 (75.4)	24.7 (76.5)	23.5 (74.3)	20.8 (69.4)	17.6 (63.7)	15.9 (60.6)	15.0 (59.0)	15.7 (60.3)	16.8 (62.2)	18.6 (65.5)	20.6 (69.1)	22.5 (72.5)	19.7 (67.4)
Daily mean °C (°F)	18.9 (66.0)	19.5 (67.1)	18.5 (65.3)	16.3 (61.3)	13.3 (55.9)	11.4 (52.5)	10.6 (51.1)	11.3 (52.3)	12.4 (54.3)	14.2 (57.6)	15.8 (60.4)	17.5 (63.5)	15.0 (58.9)
Mean daily minimum °C (°F)	13.7 (56.7)	14.3 (57.7)	13.4 (56.1)	11.8 (53.2)	9.0 (48.2)	6.9 (44.4)	6.1 (43.0)	6.8 (44.2)	8.0 (46.4)	9.8 (49.6)	10.9 (51.6)	12.4 (54.3)	10.3 (50.4)
Mean minimum °C (°F)	7.7 (45.9)	8.5 (47.3)	7.6 (45.7)	5.4 (41.7)	1.4 (34.5)	−0.3 (31.5)	−0.7 (30.7)	0.5 (32.9)	1.7 (35.1)	3.0 (37.4)	4.4 (39.9)	6.3 (43.3)	−1.6 (29.1)
Record low °C (°F)	4.5 (40.1)	5.0 (41.0)	5.0 (41.0)	2.7 (36.9)	−1.0 (30.2)	−3.0 (26.6)	−2.3 (27.9)	−1.9 (28.6)	−0.7 (30.7)	0.5 (32.9)	2.8 (37.0)	3.5 (38.3)	−3 (27)
Average rainfall mm (inches)	83 (3.3)	130 (5.1)	91 (3.6)	122 (4.8)	144 (5.7)	177 (7.0)	154 (6.1)	169 (6.7)	127 (5.0)	128 (5.0)	100 (3.9)	101 (4.0)	1,526 (60.2)
Source: NIWA (rainfall 1951–1980

== Education ==
Umawera School is a coeducational contributing primary (years 1–6) school with a roll of 28 students as of November 2024.
