= Kokopu, New Zealand =

Kokopu
- Coordinates: 35°42′24″S 174°8′42″E
- Country: New Zealand
- Region: Northland Region
- District: Whangarei District

Kokopu is a locality in Northland, New Zealand. Whangarei lies about 20 km to the east.

== Education ==
Kokopu School is a coeducational full primary (years 1–8) school with a decile rating of 9 and a roll of 95. The school was established in 1914, and for the first twenty years it operated half-time, sharing its teacher with Kara School.
