= Matihetihe =

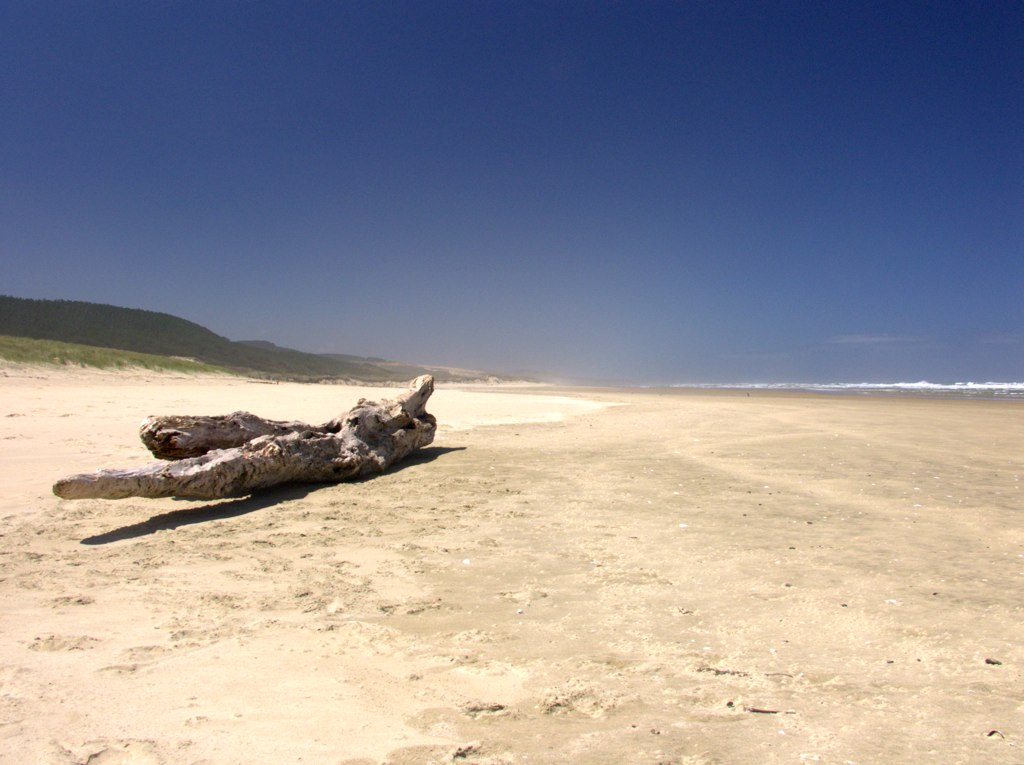
- Mitimiti Beach
- Interactive map of Matihetihe
- Coordinates: 35°26′13″S 173°17′2″E
- Country: New Zealand
- Region: Northland Region
- District: Far North District
- Ward: Kaikohe-Hokianga
- Community: Kaikohe-Hokianga
- Subdivision: North Hokianga
- Electorates: Northland; Te Tai Tokerau

Government
  - Territorial Authority: Far North District Council
  - Regional council: Northland Regional Council
  - Mayor of Far North: Moko Tepania
  - Northland MP: Grant McCallum
  - Te Tai Tokerau MP: Mariameno Kapa-Kingi

Matihetihe is a community in the Hokianga area of Northland, New Zealand. The Warawara Forest lies to the north. The Matihetihe Stream runs into the Tasman Sea to the west. The locality is named for the tihetihe tumbleweed that grows in the local sand dunes.

== Demographics ==
Matihetihe is in an SA1 statistical area which covers 115.61 km^{2} (44.64 sq mi). It is part of the Hokianga North statistical area.

Historical population for the SA1 area
| Year | Pop. | ±% p.a. |
|---|---|---|
| 2013 | 123 | — |
| 2018 | 153 | +4.46% |
| 2023 | 180 | +3.30% |

The SA1 statistical area had a population of 180 in the 2023 New Zealand census, an increase of 27 people (17.6%) since the 2018 census, and an increase of 57 people (46.3%) since the 2013 census. There were 96 males and 87 females in 66 dwellings. 1.7% of people identified as LGBTIQ+. The median age was 39.7 years (compared with 38.1 years nationally). There were 39 people (21.7%) aged under 15 years, 21 (11.7%) aged 15 to 29, 87 (48.3%) aged 30 to 64, and 30 (16.7%) aged 65 or older.

People could identify as more than one ethnicity. The results were 35.0% European (Pākehā), 90.0% Māori, 6.7% Pasifika, 3.3% Asian, and 3.3% other, which includes people giving their ethnicity as "New Zealander". English was spoken by 95.0%, Māori language by 33.3%, and Samoan by 1.7%. No language could be spoken by 1.7% (e.g. too young to talk). The percentage of people born overseas was 5.0, compared with 28.8% nationally.

Religious affiliations were 55.0% Christian, and 1.7% Māori religious beliefs. People who answered that they had no religion were 41.7%, and 1.7% of people did not answer the census question.

Of those at least 15 years old, 6 (4.3%) people had a bachelor's or higher degree, 87 (61.7%) had a post-high school certificate or diploma, and 39 (27.7%) people exclusively held high school qualifications. The median income was $21,400, compared with $41,500 nationally. 3 people (2.1%) earned over $100,000 compared to 12.1% nationally. The employment status of those at least 15 was that 33 (23.4%) people were employed full-time, 21 (14.9%) were part-time, and 9 (6.4%) were unemployed.

== History and culture ==
Matehetihe Marae is affiliated with Te Rarawa iwi.

== Education ==
Matihetihe School is a coeducational full primary (years 1-8) school with a roll of 22 students as of July 2026. The school was founded in 1890, and was initially a part-time Native School taught at the Matihetihe whare. The artist Ralph Hotere attended this school.
