= Ngunguru =

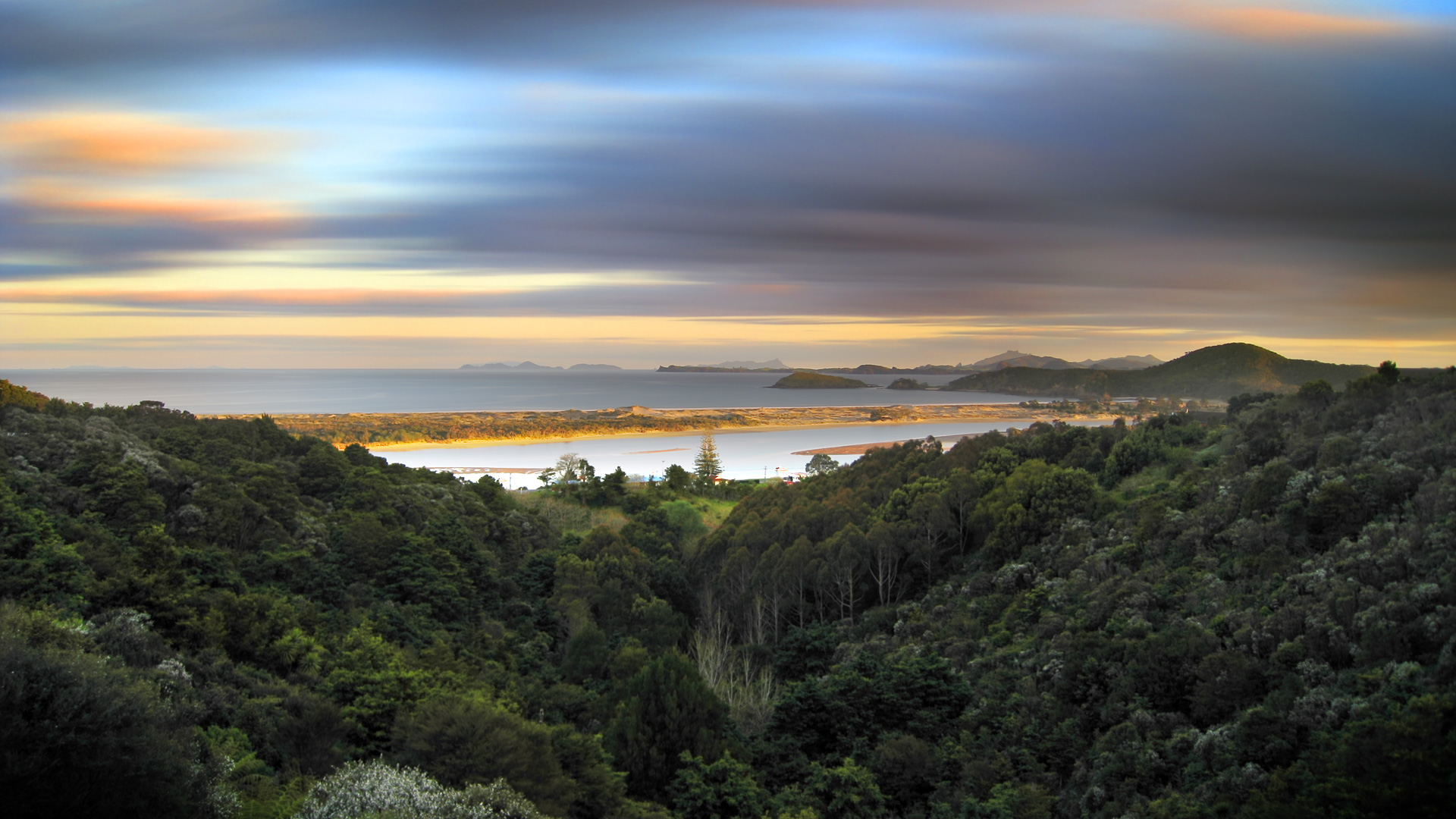
- View down to Ngunguru, across the Ngunguru River estuary and sandspit, and out into Ngunguru Bay
- Interactive map of Ngunguru
- Coordinates: 35°38′04″S 174°30′00″E
- Country: New Zealand
- Region: Northland Region
- District: Whangarei District
- Ward: Whangarei Heads Ward
- Electorates: Whangārei; Te Tai Tokerau

Government
  - Territorial Authority: Whangarei District Council
  - Regional council: Northland Regional Council
  - Mayor of Whangārei: Ken Couper
  - Whangārei MP: Shane Reti
  - Te Tai Tokerau MP: Mariameno Kapa-Kingi

Area
  - Total: 3.57 km^{2} (1.38 sq mi)

Population (June 2025)
  - Total: 1,180
  - Density: 331/km^{2} (856/sq mi)

Ngunguru is a coastal settlement in Northland, New Zealand, 26 kilometres (16 mi) north-east of Whangārei. The Ngunguru River flows between the settlement and a long low sandspit into Ngunguru Bay, which stretches southwards. North of Ngunguru are Tutukaka and Matapouri. Just off the Ngunguru coast are the Poor Knights Islands, a protected marine reserve.

Ngunguru is a Māori-language word meaning "rumbling tides".

== History ==
The waka Tūnui-ā-rangi, which brought Ngāi Tāhuhu to New Zealand according to traditional accounts, visited Ngunguru on its way from the Bay of Islands to Whangarei. The area was named by Puhi, captain of the waka Mataatua. In pre-European times, there was a substantial Māori population in the area. A large battle was fought on the Ngunguru sandspit between the local Te Waiariki and Waikato tribes led by Te Wherowhero in 1832.

The first chart of "Nongodo" was drawn by Captain N. C. Phillips of HMS Buffalo in 1836. James Busby, Gilbert Mair and W. J. Lewington bought 40,000 acres (16,000 ha) at Ngunguru in 1840, although the government disputed the sale for the next 30 years and attempted to buy the land itself from the original Māori owners. They established one of the earliest sawmills in the country at Ngunguru in 1840 to take advantage of the abundant kauri timber. It was water-powered. The mill failed financially in 1844, but others succeeded in the industry and Ngunguru exported timber, particularly roofing shingles, for many years.

The Melanesian Mission ship Southern Cross was wrecked in Ngunguru Bay in 1860. A bullock track to Whangarei was built in the 1860s. In 1892, coal was discovered at Kiripaka, at the headwaters of the Ngunguru River. 620,000 long tons (630,000 t) were mined until 1921.

The beach settlement developed after roading was improved in the 1950s. An attempt to sell the Ngunguru sandspit for property development in 2005 attracted considerable local opposition, and no buyers. In August 2011 the government purchased the spit from the Todd Property Group. The Department of Conservation will administer the reserve, which is one of a small number of sand spits that are relatively intact from an ecological perspective. Four separate assessments have ranked the spit as nationally significant.

In October 2022 the Scotland women's national rugby team visited Ngunguru Marae in what was called a celebration of "the genealogical links between Scotland and Māori" by Te Ao Māori News.

== Demographics ==
Ngunguru covers 3.57 km^{2} (1.38 sq mi) and had an estimated population of 1,180 as of June 2025, with a population density of 331 people per km^{2}.

Historical population
Year	Pop.	±% p.a.
2006	879	—
2013	918	+0.62%
2018	1,164	+4.86%
2023	1,173	+0.15%

Ngunguru had a population of 1,173 in the 2023 New Zealand census, an increase of 9 people (0.8%) since the 2018 census, and an increase of 255 people (27.8%) since the 2013 census. There were 582 males, 588 females and 3 people of other genders in 450 dwellings. 2.0% of people identified as LGBTIQ+. The median age was 46.3 years (compared with 38.1 years nationally). There were 222 people (18.9%) aged under 15 years, 147 (12.5%) aged 15 to 29, 516 (44.0%) aged 30 to 64, and 291 (24.8%) aged 65 or older.

People could identify as more than one ethnicity. The results were 88.0% European (Pākehā); 20.7% Māori; 2.6% Pasifika; 2.8% Asian; 1.5% Middle Eastern, Latin American and African New Zealanders (MELAA); and 2.6% other, which includes people giving their ethnicity as "New Zealander". English was spoken by 98.5%, Māori language by 4.9%, and other languages by 8.4%. No language could be spoken by 1.3% (e.g. too young to talk). New Zealand Sign Language was known by 0.3%. The percentage of people born overseas was 21.7, compared with 28.8% nationally.

Religious affiliations were 22.3% Christian, 0.8% Hindu, 0.3% Islam, 0.5% Māori religious beliefs, 0.3% Buddhist, 0.5% New Age, 1.3% Jewish, and 1.5% other religions. People who answered that they had no religion were 65.7%, and 7.4% of people did not answer the census question.

Of those at least 15 years old, 210 (22.1%) people had a bachelor's or higher degree, 492 (51.7%) had a post-high school certificate or diploma, and 177 (18.6%) people exclusively held high school qualifications. The median income was $39,500, compared with $41,500 nationally. 105 people (11.0%) earned over $100,000 compared to 12.1% nationally. The employment status of those at least 15 was that 414 (43.5%) people were employed full-time, 162 (17.0%) were part-time, and 21 (2.2%) were unemployed.

== Facilities ==
Ngunguru School is a coeducational full primary (years 1–8) school with a roll of 233 students as of July 2026. The school celebrated its centennial in 1970.

Ngunguru has a sports and recreation club, which started in the late 1970s in a leased farm paddock. Then in 1979 the first club committee took over the land lease and started building up the club's facilities. The sports ground was officially opened on 20 March 1982 with a gala and a rugby match "between the Northland Vikings (a virtual Northland side) and a star-studded Ngunguru Invitation side which included three former All Blacks".
