= Waiharara =

- Interactive map of Waiharara
- Coordinates: 34°57′11″S 173°11′18″E
- Country: New Zealand
- Region: Northland Region
- District: Far North District
- Ward: Te Hiku
- Community: Te Hiku
- Subdivision: North Cape
- Electorates: Northland; Te Tai Tokerau

Government
  - Territorial Authority: Far North District Council
  - Regional council: Northland Regional Council
  - Mayor of Far North: Moko Tepania
  - Northland MP: Grant McCallum
  - Te Tai Tokerau MP: Mariameno Kapa-Kingi

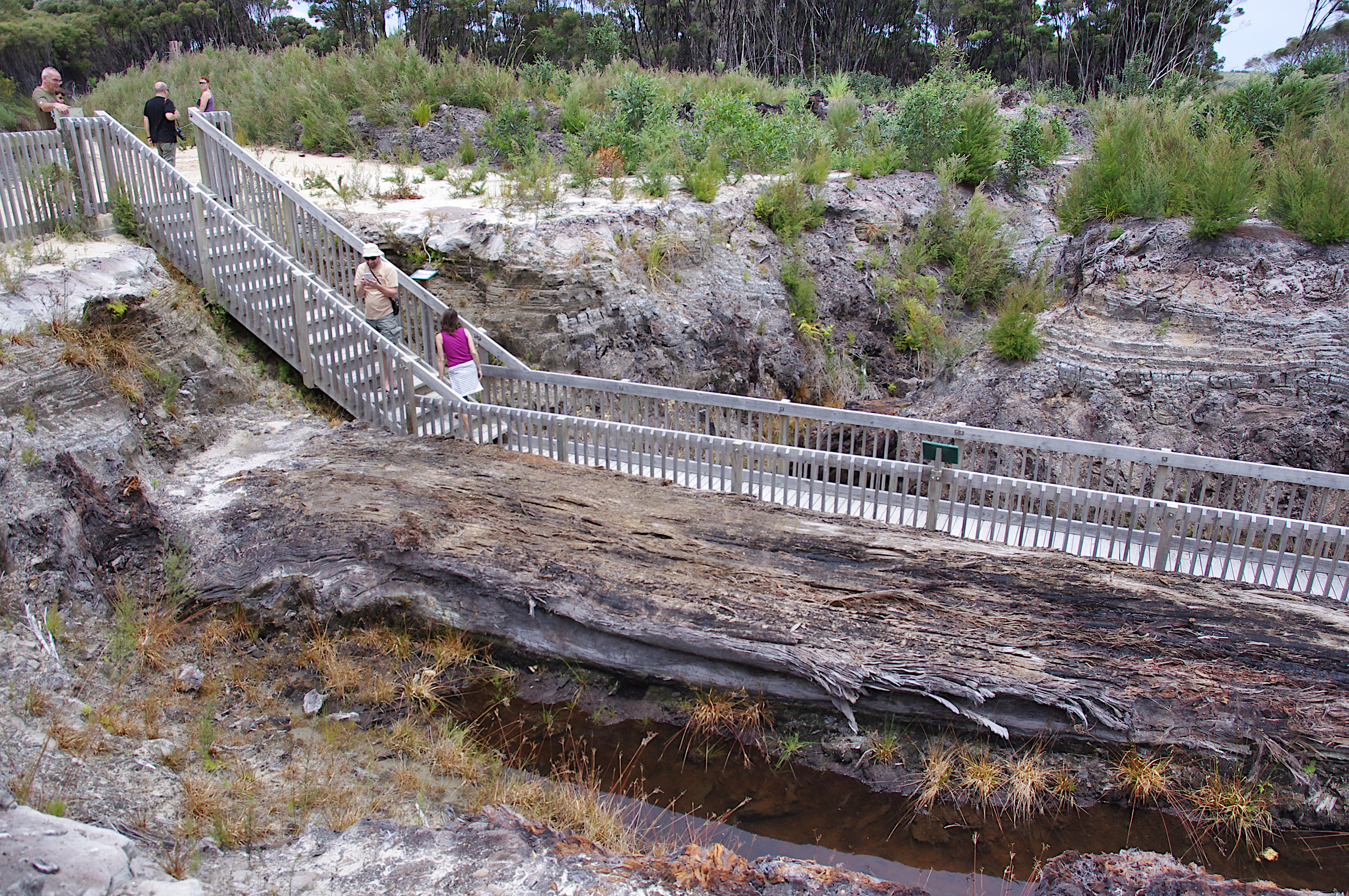
A walkway over the trunk of an ancient Kauri tree at Gumdiggers Park

Waiharara is a community at the base of the Aupōuri Peninsula in Northland, New Zealand. State Highway 1 runs through the community. To the west is Aupouri Forest, and beyond that Ninety Mile Beach. To the east is Rangaunu Harbour. Houhora is 22 km north west, and Awanui is 16 km south east. Lake Waiparera, 35 metres (115 feet) above sea level, is immediately to the north west.

Gumdiggers Park is a commercial guided walk over the site of New Zealand's largest kauri gumfield.

== Demographics ==
Waiharara is in an SA1 statistical area which covers 124.52 km^{2} (48.08 sq mi) and includes the area between Muiata Pa and just north of Paparore, but excludes Kaimaumau. The SA1 area is part of the larger Rangaunu Harbour statistical area.

Historical population
Year	Pop.	±% p.a.
2006	207	—
2013	228	+1.39%
2018	243	+1.28%
2023	285	+3.24%

The statistical area had a population of 285 in the 2023 New Zealand census, an increase of 42 people (17.3%) since the 2018 census, and an increase of 57 people (25.0%) since the 2013 census. There were 141 males, 141 females and 3 people of other genders in 96 dwellings. 1.1% of people identified as LGBTIQ+. The median age was 41.8 years (compared with 38.1 years nationally). There were 63 people (22.1%) aged under 15 years, 48 (16.8%) aged 15 to 29, 111 (38.9%) aged 30 to 64, and 60 (21.1%) aged 65 or older.

People could identify as more than one ethnicity. The results were 82.1% European (Pākehā), 53.7% Māori, 3.2% Pasifika, 1.1% Asian, and 7.4% other, which includes people giving their ethnicity as "New Zealander". English was spoken by 96.8%, Māori language by 9.5%, and other languages by 7.4%. No language could be spoken by 1.1% (e.g. too young to talk). The percentage of people born overseas was 8.4, compared with 28.8% nationally.

Religious affiliations were 35.8% Christian, 2.1% Islam, 3.2% Māori religious beliefs, 1.1% New Age, and 1.1% other religions. People who answered that they had no religion were 48.4%, and 8.4% of people did not answer the census question.

Of those at least 15 years old, 18 (8.1%) people had a bachelor's or higher degree, 120 (54.1%) had a post-high school certificate or diploma, and 72 (32.4%) people exclusively held high school qualifications. The median income was $29,400, compared with $41,500 nationally. 6 people (2.7%) earned over $100,000 compared to 12.1% nationally. The employment status of those at least 15 was that 93 (41.9%) people were employed full-time, 30 (13.5%) were part-time, and 9 (4.1%) were unemployed.

== Education ==
Waiharara School is a coeducational full primary (years 1–8) school with a roll of 17 as of July 2026. The school opened in 1901.
