= Poroti =

- Coordinates: 35°44′17″S 174°08′19″E
- Country: New Zealand
- Region: Northland Region
- District: Whangarei District

Poroti is a locality in Northland, New Zealand. Titoki is about 7 km to the west, and Maungatapere is about 8 km east.

Around Poroti are a large number of orchards growing avocado, and a number of flower growing operations growing Sandersonia, calla lilies, orchids, and hydrangeas for export markets all over the world.

== Education ==
Poroti School is a coeducational full primary (years 1–8) school with a decile rating of 6 and a roll of 37. The school held a 125-year reunion in 2004.
