= Matarau =

- Interactive map of Matarau
- Coordinates: 35°39′15″S 174°13′17″E
- Country: New Zealand
- Region: Northland Region
- District: Whangarei District
- Ward: Hikurangi-Coastal Ward
- Electorates: Whangārei; Te Tai Tokerau

Government
  - Territorial Authority: Whangarei District Council
  - Regional council: Northland Regional Council
  - Mayor of Whangārei: Ken Couper
  - Whangārei MP: Shane Reti
  - Te Tai Tokerau MP: Mariameno Kapa-Kingi

Area
  - Total: 15.31 km^{2} (5.91 sq mi)

Population (2023 Census)
  - Total: 465
  - Density: 30.4/km^{2} (78.7/sq mi)

Matarau is a locality in Northland, New Zealand. Kamo is to the southeast. The area is changing from farmland to lifestyle blocks.

The name "Matarau" means many points or many spears.

== Demographics ==
Matarau is in two SA1 statistical areas which cover 15.31 km^{2} (5.91 sq mi). The SA1 areas are part of the larger Matarau statistical area.

Historical population for Matarau and surrounds
Year	Pop.	±% p.a.
2013	423	—
2018	447	+1.11%
2023	465	+0.79%

The SA2 areas had a population of 465 in the 2023 New Zealand census, an increase of 18 people (4.0%) since the 2018 census, and an increase of 42 people (9.9%) since the 2013 census. There were 237 males and 231 females in 144 dwellings. 1.3% of people identified as LGBTIQ+. There were 102 people (21.9%) aged under 15 years, 87 (18.7%) aged 15 to 29, 210 (45.2%) aged 30 to 64, and 66 (14.2%) aged 65 or older.

People could identify as more than one ethnicity. The results were 92.9% European (Pākehā); 22.6% Māori; 5.2% Pasifika; 1.9% Asian; 1.3% Middle Eastern, Latin American and African New Zealanders (MELAA); and 2.6% other, which includes people giving their ethnicity as "New Zealander". English was spoken by 98.1%, Māori language by 3.2%, and other languages by 4.5%. No language could be spoken by 1.9% (e.g. too young to talk). New Zealand Sign Language was known by 0.6%. The percentage of people born overseas was 10.3, compared with 28.8% nationally.

Religious affiliations were 27.1% Christian, and 1.9% other religions. People who answered that they had no religion were 60.0%, and 11.0% of people did not answer the census question.

Of those at least 15 years old, 45 (12.4%) people had a bachelor's or higher degree, 243 (66.9%) had a post-high school certificate or diploma, and 63 (17.4%) people exclusively held high school qualifications. 48 people (13.2%) earned over $100,000 compared to 12.1% nationally. The employment status of those at least 15 was that 198 (54.5%) people were employed full-time, 63 (17.4%) were part-time, and 9 (2.5%) were unemployed.

=== Matarau statistical area ===
Matarau statistical area covers 104.42 km^{2} (40.32 sq mi) and had an estimated population of 3,120 as of June 2025, with a population density of 30 people per km^{2}.

Historical population for the statistical area
Year	Pop.	±% p.a.
2006	2,277	—
2013	2,337	+0.37%
2018	2,676	+2.75%
2023	2,955	+2.00%
The 2006 population is for a larger area of 108.39 km^{2} Source:

Matarau statistical area had a population of 2,955 in the 2023 New Zealand census, an increase of 279 people (10.4%) since the 2018 census, and an increase of 618 people (26.4%) since the 2013 census. There were 1,509 males, 1,443 females and 3 people of other genders in 957 dwellings. 1.8% of people identified as LGBTIQ+. The median age was 40.6 years (compared with 38.1 years nationally). There were 639 people (21.6%) aged under 15 years, 474 (16.0%) aged 15 to 29, 1,383 (46.8%) aged 30 to 64, and 459 (15.5%) aged 65 or older.

People could identify as more than one ethnicity. The results were 90.8% European (Pākehā); 20.7% Māori; 2.5% Pasifika; 3.2% Asian; 0.7% Middle Eastern, Latin American and African New Zealanders (MELAA); and 3.0% other, which includes people giving their ethnicity as "New Zealander". English was spoken by 98.2%, Māori language by 3.8%, Samoan by 0.1%, and other languages by 5.1%. No language could be spoken by 1.6% (e.g. too young to talk). New Zealand Sign Language was known by 0.3%. The percentage of people born overseas was 14.2, compared with 28.8% nationally.

Religious affiliations were 27.5% Christian, 0.3% Hindu, 0.2% Islam, 0.4% Māori religious beliefs, 0.7% Buddhist, 0.2% New Age, and 1.3% other religions. People who answered that they had no religion were 61.8%, and 7.6% of people did not answer the census question.

Of those at least 15 years old, 357 (15.4%) people had a bachelor's or higher degree, 1,425 (61.5%) had a post-high school certificate or diploma, and 396 (17.1%) people exclusively held high school qualifications. The median income was $45,600, compared with $41,500 nationally. 327 people (14.1%) earned over $100,000 compared to 12.1% nationally. The employment status of those at least 15 was that 1,233 (53.2%) people were employed full-time, 405 (17.5%) were part-time, and 54 (2.3%) were unemployed.

== Education ==
Matarau School is a coeducational full primary school (years 1-8) with a roll of 266 students as of March 2026. The school was founded in 1877 as Ruatangata East School. Otakairanga School amalgamated with Matarau School in 1949, and Ruatangata West School also closed in favour of Matarau in 1973.
