= Dargaville Primary School =

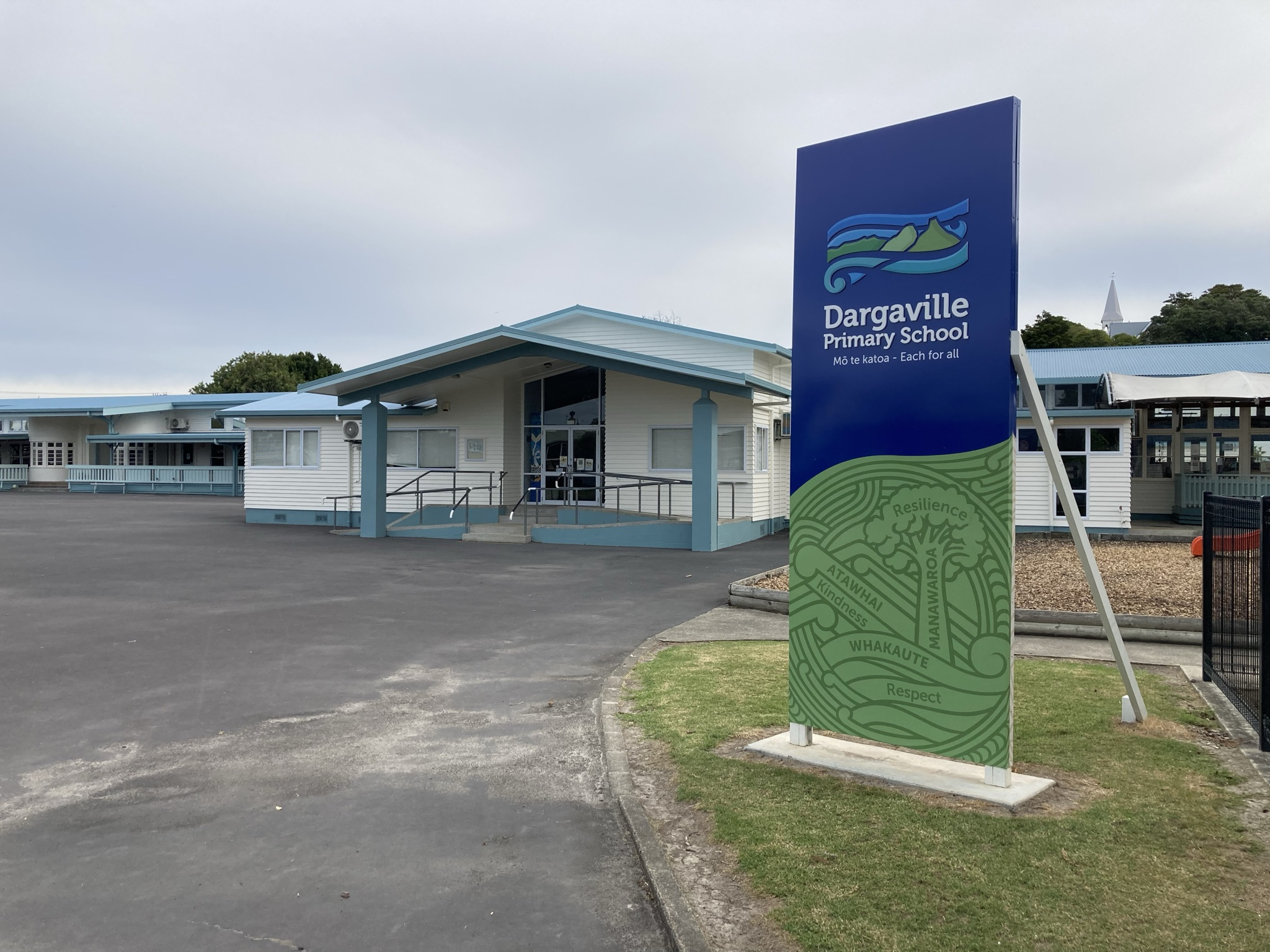

Location
- Gordon St, Dargaville; 35°56′21″S 173°52′00″E

Information
- Type: State coed primary, years 1–6
- Motto: Each for all
- Established: 1877
- Ministry of Education Institution no.: 1009
- Principal: Curtis Gaylor
- Enrolment: 401 (July 2026)
- Socio-economic decile: 4
- Website: dargavilleprimary.school.nz

Dargaville Primary School is the largest primary school in the town of Dargaville, New Zealand. It is situated in the Dargaville Central Business District (CBD). The school takes students from the age of five up to eleven.

It was the original school in Dargaville established by 1877. In 1879, it had a roll of 16, which grew to 155 in 1899, and by 2008 reached just over 400 each year.

The pupils attending the school come from the town and the surrounding rural area. Rural students travel by bus each day. Baylys Beach is a small settlement about 15 kilometres from Dargaville. A bus load of children travel to and from Dargaville Primary School each day.

Dargaville Primary School is the Lead school for the Northern Wairoa Information and Communication Technologies Professional Development Cluster. It is also Lead school for the Northern Wairoa Resource Teachers for Learning and Behaviour cluster.
