= Houhora =

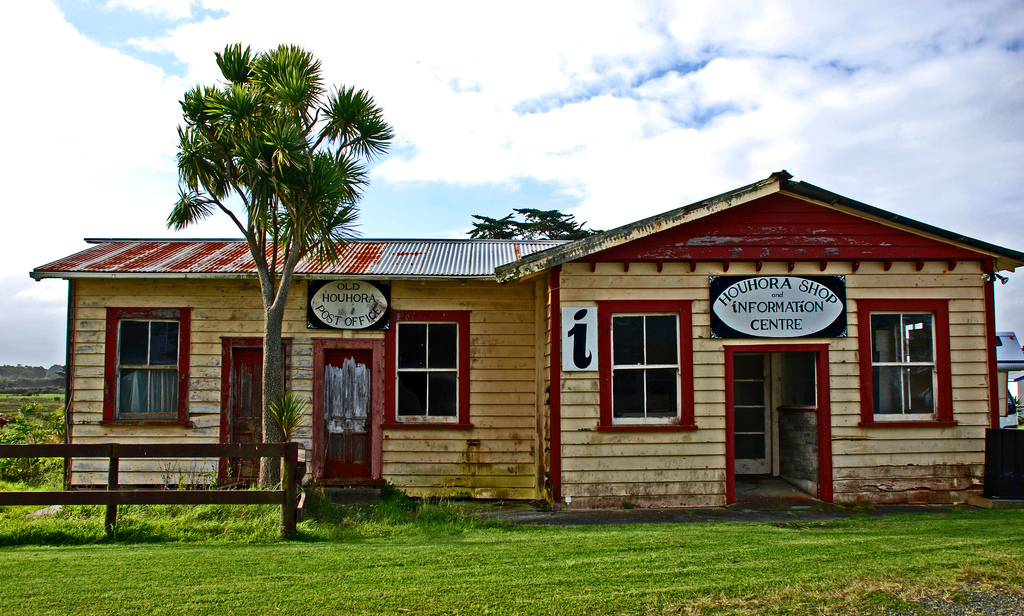
- Houhora post office
- Interactive map of Houhora
- Coordinates: 34°47′47″S 173°6′24″E
- Country: New Zealand
- Region: Northland Region
- District: Far North District
- Ward: Te Hiku
- Community: Te Hiku
- Subdivision: North Cape
- Electorates: Northland; Te Tai Tokerau

Government
  - Territorial Authority: Far North District Council
  - Regional council: Northland Regional Council
  - Mayor of Far North: Moko Tepania
  - Northland MP: Grant McCallum
  - Te Tai Tokerau MP: Mariameno Kapa-Kingi

Area
  - Total: 26.04 km^{2} (10.05 sq mi)

Population (2023 census)
  - Total: 237
  - Density: 9.10/km^{2} (23.6/sq mi)

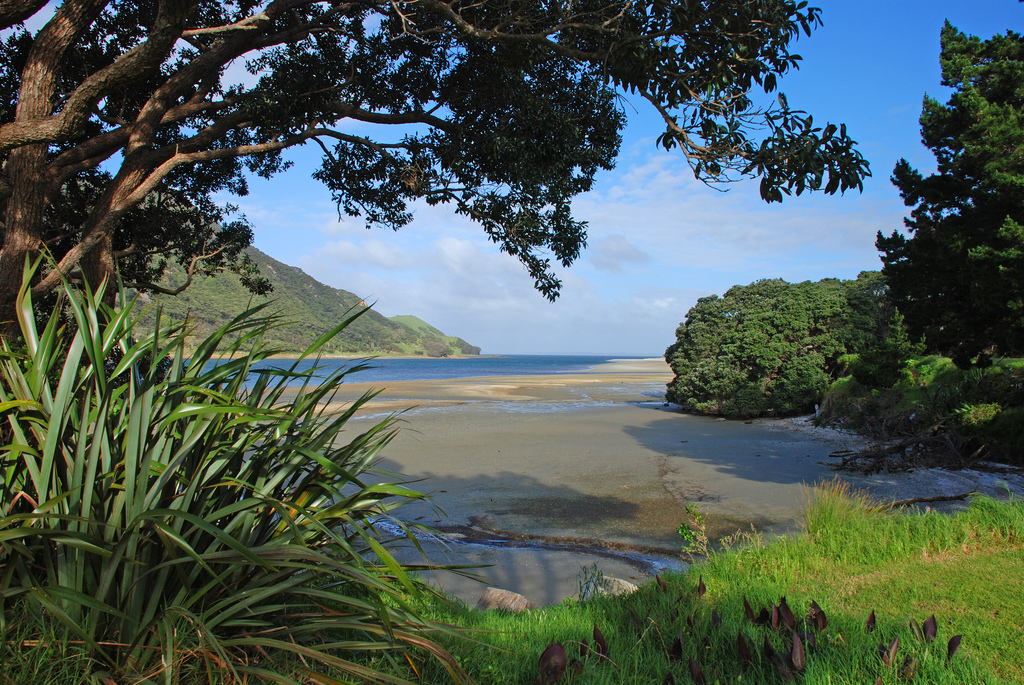
Houhora Heads

Houhora is a locality and harbour on the east side of the Aupōuri Peninsula of Northland, New Zealand. It is 41 km (25 mi) north of Kaitaia. Waihopo, Te Raupo, Pukenui, Raio and Houhora Heads are associated localities on the southern shores of the harbour. State Highway 1 passes through all these localities except for Houhora Heads. Te Kao is 24 km north west, and Waiharara is 22 km south east.

The harbour is long and narrow, mostly sheltered, with exposed sand banks at low tide. There is a deep channel along the southern shore as far as Pukenui Wharf. Tohoraha / Mount Camel (also called Mt Houhora) is a 236-metre hill forming the north head. The south head is flat.

== History ==
Houhora Mountain was the first part of New Zealand that the early explorer Kupe saw, but he thought it was a whale, according to Māori legend. Houhora was a Māori base settlement in the early 14th century. Snapper, seals, dolphins, moa and other birds were food sources.

James Cook named Mt Camel, on the north head of Houhora Harbour, on 10 December 1769. He described it in his log as "a high mountain or hill standing upon a desert shore."

Te Houtaewa was a Te Aupōuri athlete who was killed at Pukenui during the Musket Wars of the early 19th century.

In the 19th century, Houhora Harbour provisioned whalers, and residents mounted their own whaling expeditions in open boats. Three families – Wagener, Subritzky and Yates – settled in the area to farm and trade. The Subritzky family, who arrived near Motueka in 1843, claim to be New Zealand's first Polish settlers. They moved to Australia and then to Houhora Heads. Their homestead there took two years to build in the 1860s. It was sold to a member of the Wagener family in 1897. The homestead, now largely restored, is open to the public. The Wagener Museum at Houhora Heads, built by W. E. Wagener, was built near the homestead. It contained an eclectic collection of artefacts, but closed in 2003 and a substantial part of the collection was sold off.

A lifeboat from SS Elingamite, which was wrecked on the Three Kings Islands on 9 November 1902, arrived in Houhora the following day with 52 survivors. One of the whalers immediately was dispatched to intercept any vessel along the coast to divert it to the Three Kings. This mission was successful.

In the latter 19th century and early 20th century, land around Houhora was used for the kauri gum digging trade. By the 1910s, the kauri gum industry was centred in Houhora and Ahipara.

== Demographics ==
Houhora is in an SA1 statistical area which covers 26.04 km^{2} (10.05 sq mi). The SA1 area is part of the larger North Cape statistical area.

Historical population
Year	Pop.	±% p.a.
2006	111	—
2013	144	+3.79%
2018	174	+3.86%
2023	237	+6.38%

The SA1 statistical area had a population of 237 in the 2023 New Zealand census, an increase of 63 people (36.2%) since the 2018 census, and an increase of 93 people (64.6%) since the 2013 census. There were 111 males, and 126 females in 75 dwellings. 1.3% of people identified as LGBTIQ+. The median age was 39.2 years (compared with 38.1 years nationally). There were 63 people (26.6%) aged under 15 years, 33 (13.9%) aged 15 to 29, 111 (46.8%) aged 30 to 64, and 33 (13.9%) aged 65 or older.

People could identify as more than one ethnicity. The results were 57.0% European (Pākehā); 53.2% Māori, 6.3% Pasifika, 1.3% Asian, and 6.3% other, which includes people giving their ethnicity as "New Zealander". English was spoken by 97.5%, Māori language by 10.1%, and other languages by 1.3%. No language could be spoken by 2.5% (e.g. too young to talk). The percentage of people born overseas was 2.5, compared with 28.8% nationally.

Religious affiliations were 30.4% Christian, 5.1% Māori religious beliefs, 1.3% New Age, and 1.3% other religions. People who answered that they had no religion were 58.2%, and 5.1% of people did not answer the census question.

Of those at least 15 years old, 12 (6.9%) people had a bachelor's or higher degree, 102 (58.6%) had a post-high school certificate or diploma, and 54 (31.0%) people exclusively held high school qualifications. The median income was $26,900, compared with $41,500 nationally. 6 people (3.4%) earned over $100,000 compared to 12.1% nationally. The employment status of those at least 15 was that 63 (36.2%) people were employed full-time, 27 (15.5%) were part-time, and 3 (1.7%) were unemployed.

== Notable people ==
- Lloyd Trigg, a pilot in the RNZAF during World War II, and Victoria Cross recipient.
