= Pukenui =

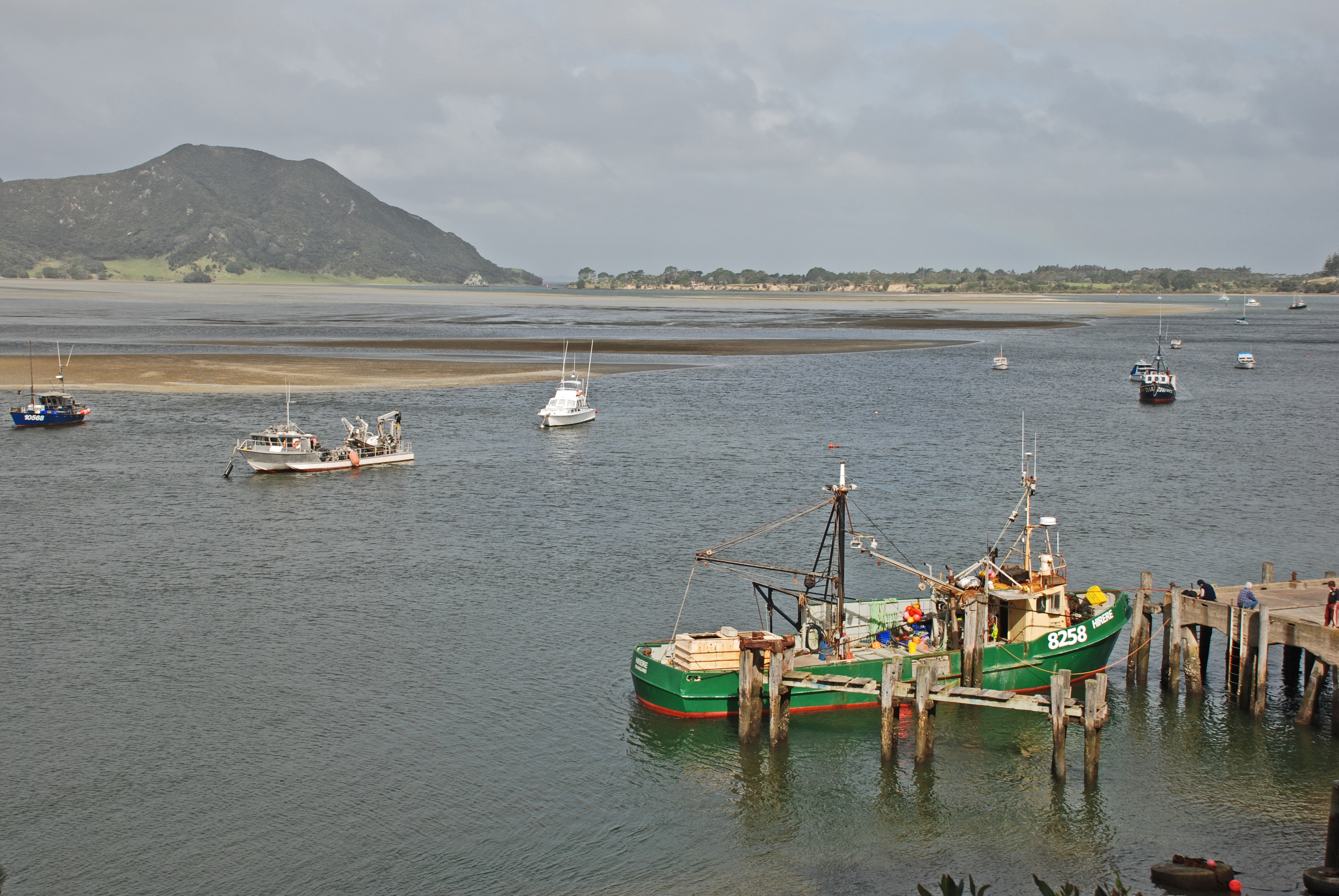
- Pukenui wharf
- Interactive map of Pukenui
- Coordinates: 34.833°S 173.131°E
- Country: New Zealand
- Region: Northland Region
- District: Far North District
- Ward: Te Hiku
- Electorates: Northland; Te Tai Tokerau

Government
  - Territorial Authority: Far North District Council
  - Regional council: Northland Regional Council
  - Mayor of Far North: Moko Tepania
  - Northland MP: Grant McCallum
  - Te Tai Tokerau MP: Mariameno Kapa-Kingi

Area
  - Total: 20.70 km^{2} (7.99 sq mi)

Population (June 2025)
  - Total: 810
  - Density: 39/km^{2} (100/sq mi)

Pukenui is a locality on the southwest side of Houhora Harbour on the Aupouri Peninsula of Northland, New Zealand. State Highway 1 runs through it. The name means "large hill" in the Māori language.

== Demographics ==
Statistics New Zealand describes Pukenui as a rural settlement. It covers 20.70 km^{2} (7.99 sq mi) and had an estimated population of 810 as of June 2025, with a population density of 39 people per km^{2}. Pukenui is part of the larger North Cape statistical area.

Historical population
Year	Pop.	±% p.a.
2006	591	—
2013	615	+0.57%
2018	705	+2.77%
2023	834	+3.42%

Pukenui had a population of 834 in the 2023 New Zealand census, an increase of 129 people (18.3%) since the 2018 census, and an increase of 219 people (35.6%) since the 2013 census. There were 423 males, and 408 females in 333 dwellings. 1.8% of people identified as LGBTIQ+. The median age was 51.4 years (compared with 38.1 years nationally). There were 129 people (15.5%) aged under 15 years, 111 (13.3%) aged 15 to 29, 360 (43.2%) aged 30 to 64, and 234 (28.1%) aged 65 or older.

People could identify as more than one ethnicity. The results were 74.1% European (Pākehā), 43.5% Māori, 5.0% Pasifika, 1.1% Asian, and 2.9% other, which includes people giving their ethnicity as "New Zealander". English was spoken by 96.8%, Māori language by 11.5%, and other languages by 4.7%. No language could be spoken by 1.4% (e.g. too young to talk). New Zealand Sign Language was known by 0.4%. The percentage of people born overseas was 8.3, compared with 28.8% nationally.

Religious affiliations were 29.1% Christian, and 9.4% Māori religious beliefs. People who answered that they had no religion were 54.0%, and 7.2% of people did not answer the census question.

Of those at least 15 years old, 66 (9.4%) people had a bachelor's or higher degree, 414 (58.7%) had a post-high school certificate or diploma, and 207 (29.4%) people exclusively held high school qualifications. The median income was $28,100, compared with $41,500 nationally. 36 people (5.1%) earned over $100,000 compared to 12.1% nationally. The employment status of those at least 15 was that 249 (35.3%) people were employed full-time, 111 (15.7%) were part-time, and 18 (2.6%) were unemployed.

== Education ==
Pukenui School is a coeducational full primary (years 1–8) school with a roll of 102 students as of July 2026. The school first opened in 1896.
