= Purua =

- Coordinates: 35°37′56″S 174°06′26″E
- Country: New Zealand
- Region: Northland Region
- District: Whangarei District

Purua is a locality north west of Whangārei in Northland, New Zealand. A hill also called Purua with a summit 387 m above sea level lies to the east. The area mainly consists of rolling hills and river flats. Farming is Dairy, Sheep and Beef. The local hall is one of the notable buildings.

== History ==
Organised by Belgian Consul Arthur Masy, a party of Walloon settlers would take up former government land in the area in the 1890s, although the settlement did not reach the size that Masy had intended, with only a dozen or so families arriving out of the planned group of about fifty.

== Education ==
Purua School is a coeducational full primary (years 1–8) school with a roll of 27 as of July 2025.

== Climate ==
Climate data for Puketurua (4.5km SW of Purua, 1965–1975)
Month	Jan	Feb	Mar	Apr	May	Jun	Jul	Aug	Sep	Oct	Nov	Dec	Year
Record high °C (°F)	30.6 (87.1)	32.5 (90.5)	30.6 (87.1)	29.2 (84.6)	23.6 (74.5)	21.1 (70.0)	19.9 (67.8)	21.7 (71.1)	23.9 (75.0)	24.1 (75.4)	27.3 (81.1)	29.5 (85.1)	32.5 (90.5)
Mean maximum °C (°F)	29.3 (84.7)	29.7 (85.5)	27.6 (81.7)	24.7 (76.5)	22.1 (71.8)	19.7 (67.5)	18.3 (64.9)	19.3 (66.7)	21.2 (70.2)	22.9 (73.2)	25.5 (77.9)	27.3 (81.1)	30.1 (86.2)
Mean daily maximum °C (°F)	25.1 (77.2)	25.2 (77.4)	23.6 (74.5)	20.8 (69.4)	18.2 (64.8)	15.8 (60.4)	14.9 (58.8)	15.9 (60.6)	17.3 (63.1)	19.0 (66.2)	21.4 (70.5)	23.1 (73.6)	20.0 (68.0)
Daily mean °C (°F)	19.1 (66.4)	19.4 (66.9)	18.4 (65.1)	15.7 (60.3)	13.4 (56.1)	11.4 (52.5)	10.2 (50.4)	11.3 (52.3)	12.6 (54.7)	14.0 (57.2)	15.9 (60.6)	17.5 (63.5)	14.9 (58.8)
Mean daily minimum °C (°F)	13.1 (55.6)	13.7 (56.7)	13.1 (55.6)	10.7 (51.3)	8.6 (47.5)	6.9 (44.4)	5.5 (41.9)	6.7 (44.1)	7.8 (46.0)	9.0 (48.2)	10.5 (50.9)	11.9 (53.4)	9.8 (49.6)
Mean minimum °C (°F)	7.4 (45.3)	7.6 (45.7)	6.4 (43.5)	3.8 (38.8)	1.5 (34.7)	−0.6 (30.9)	−1.5 (29.3)	−0.6 (30.9)	1.5 (34.7)	2.0 (35.6)	3.6 (38.5)	5.9 (42.6)	−2.1 (28.2)
Record low °C (°F)	5.4 (41.7)	5.3 (41.5)	4.8 (40.6)	1.9 (35.4)	−1.7 (28.9)	−2.7 (27.1)	−3.6 (25.5)	−2.9 (26.8)	−1.7 (28.9)	0.0 (32.0)	1.1 (34.0)	3.2 (37.8)	−3.6 (25.5)
Average rainfall mm (inches)	68.9 (2.71)	107.0 (4.21)	95.4 (3.76)	113.2 (4.46)	114.5 (4.51)	165.3 (6.51)	125.4 (4.94)	155.5 (6.12)	117.7 (4.63)	97.0 (3.82)	103.7 (4.08)	104.5 (4.11)	1,368.1 (53.86)
Source: NIWA
