= Waiotira =

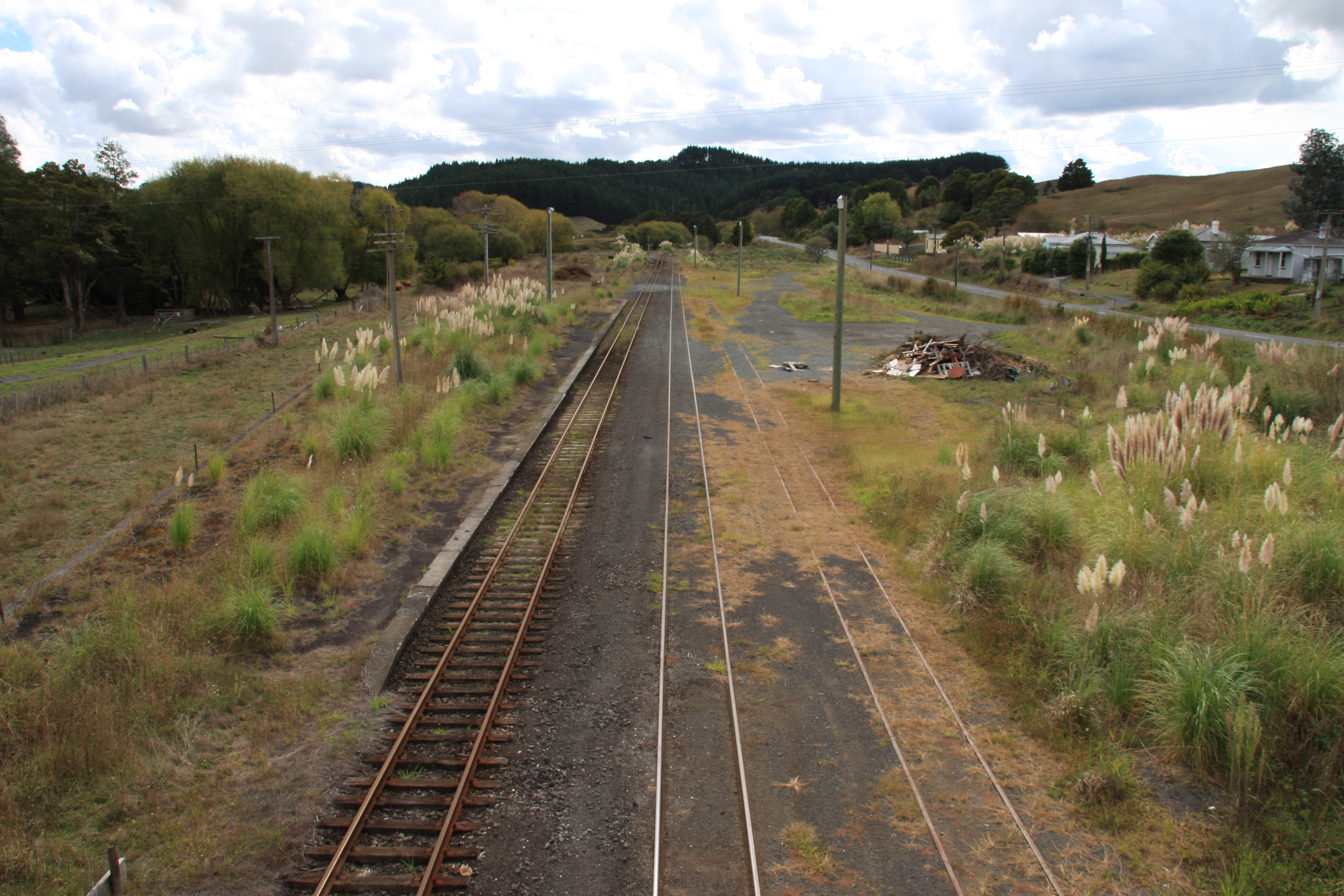
- View of the former Waiotira railway station from the Mititai Road overbridge, with some of the township at right.

- Location within Northland Region
- Coordinates: 35°56′12″S 174°11′56″E
- Country: New Zealand
- Region: Northland Region
- District: Whangarei District

Waiotira is a locality in Northland, New Zealand. Whangārei is to the northeast. Tauraroa is about 9 km northeast, and the Waiotira Stream flows southwest to join with the Omaru River.

== Transport ==
Waiotira is on the North Auckland Line and it is the junction for the Dargaville Branch. The first trains operated in 1921 during construction of the North Auckland Line: they carried schoolchildren between Waiotira and Waikiekie, and allowed residents to visit Portland and Whangārei. The first through trains ran between Auckland and Whangarei in 1923. Waiotira became a junction in 1928 when the first stage of the Dargaville Branch opened to Kirikopuni. Trains from Waiotira could run all the way to Dargaville from 1941.

Waiotira became an important intermediate station on the North Auckland Line. It had an island platform where passengers could transfer between mixed trains to/from Dargaville and the Northland Express or its 88 seater railcar successors. It also had a railway yard and facilities for line maintenance staff. The railcars ceased in 1967, as did the mixed trains to Dargaville; a mixed service between Maungaturoto and Whangarei called at Waiotira until its cancellation on 15 September 1975. Most station facilities were removed in the 1980s. The tracks on the west side of the platform and some of the yard have now been lifted and the Dargaville Branch was mothballed in 2014; goods trains continue to run through Waiotira on the North Auckland Line.

Waiotira is not on the New Zealand state highway network.

== Education ==
Waiotira School is a coeducational contributing primary (years 1–6) school with a roll of 28 students as of July 2026.

== Recreation ==
Waiotira contains a nine-hole golf course and a pony club.
