= Kaingaroa, Northland =

Kaingaroa
- Interactive map of Kaingaroa
- Coordinates: 35°1′35″S 173°19′43″E
- Country: New Zealand
- Region: Northland Region
- District: Far North District
- Ward: Te Hiku
- Community: Te Hiku
- Subdivision: Whatuwhiwhi
- Electorates: Northland; Te Tai Tokerau

Government
  - Territorial authority: Far North District Council
  - Regional council: Northland Regional Council
  - Mayor of Far North: Moko Tepania
  - Northland MP: Grant McCallum
  - Te Tai Tokerau MP: Mariameno Kapa-Kingi

Kaingaroa is a locality in the Far North District of New Zealand. It lies on State Highway 10 north-east of Awanui and Kaitaia, and south-west of Karikari Peninsula.

== Demographics ==
Kaingaroa is in an SA1 statistical area which covers 35.38 km^{2} (13.66 sq mi). The SA1 area is part of the larger Karikari Peninsula statistical area.

Historical population
Year	Pop.	±% p.a.
2006	159	—
2013	189	+2.50%
2018	183	−0.64%
2023	249	+6.35%

The SA1 statistical area had a population of 249 in the 2023 New Zealand census, an increase of 66 people (36.1%) since the 2018 census, and an increase of 60 people (31.7%) since the 2013 census. There were 129 males, and 120 females in 87 dwellings. 1.2% of people identified as LGBTIQ+. The median age was 42.8 years (compared with 38.1 years nationally). There were 48 people (19.3%) aged under 15 years, 48 (19.3%) aged 15 to 29, 111 (44.6%) aged 30 to 64, and 42 (16.9%) aged 65 or older.

People could identify as more than one ethnicity. The results were 81.9% European (Pākehā), 34.9% Māori, 1.2% Pasifika, 1.2% Asian, and 2.4% other, which includes people giving their ethnicity as "New Zealander". English was spoken by 94.0%, Māori language by 8.4%, and other languages by 6.0%. No language could be spoken by 2.4% (e.g. too young to talk). The percentage of people born overseas was 10.8, compared with 28.8% nationally.

Religious affiliations were 25.3% Christian, 1.2% Māori religious beliefs, and 1.2% New Age. People who answered that they had no religion were 60.2%, and 10.8% of people did not answer the census question.

Of those at least 15 years old, 27 (13.4%) people had a bachelor's or higher degree, 114 (56.7%) had a post-high school certificate or diploma, and 54 (26.9%) people exclusively held high school qualifications. The median income was $32,800, compared with $41,500 nationally. 9 people (4.5%) earned over $100,000 compared to 12.1% nationally. The employment status of those at least 15 was that 102 (50.7%) people were employed full-time, 18 (9.0%) were part-time, and 12 (6.0%) were unemployed.

== Education ==
Kaingaroa School is a coeducational full primary (years 1–8) school with a roll of 106 as of July 2026. The school was established in 1873–74 as Mangatete Maori School.
