= Paparore =

- Interactive map of Paparore
- Coordinates: 34.99°S 173.21°E
- Country: New Zealand
- Region: Northland Region
- District: Far North District
- Ward: Te Hiku
- Electorates: Northland; Te Tai Tokerau

Government
  - Territorial Authority: Far North District Council
  - Regional council: Northland Regional Council
  - Mayor of Far North: Moko Tepania
  - Northland MP: Grant McCallum
  - Te Tai Tokerau MP: Mariameno Kapa-Kingi

Area
  - Total: 12.55 km^{2} (4.85 sq mi)

Population (2023 census)
  - Total: 216
  - Density: 17.2/km^{2} (44.6/sq mi)

Paparore is a small coastal settlement near the north of Waipapakauri, adjacent to Rangaunu Harbour. It has a marae and cemetery.

A New Zealand Labour Party branch was formed there in 1936.

== Demographics ==
The SA1 statistical area which includes Paparore covers 12.55 km^{2} (4.85 sq mi). The SA1 area is part of the larger Rangaunu Harbour statistical area.

Historical population
Year	Pop.	±% p.a.
2006	138	—
2013	150	+1.20%
2018	186	+4.40%
2023	216	+3.04%

The SA1 statistical area had a population of 216 in the 2023 New Zealand census, an increase of 30 people (16.1%) since the 2018 census, and an increase of 66 people (44.0%) since the 2013 census. There were 108 males, and 108 females in 66 dwellings. 1.4% of people identified as LGBTIQ+. The median age was 35.6 years (compared with 38.1 years nationally). There were 54 people (25.0%) aged under 15 years, 36 (16.7%) aged 15 to 29, 93 (43.1%) aged 30 to 64, and 36 (16.7%) aged 65 or older.

People could identify as more than one ethnicity. The results were 63.9% European (Pākehā); 70.8% Māori; 5.6% Pasifika; 1.4% Asian; 1.4% Middle Eastern, Latin American and African New Zealanders (MELAA); and 5.6% other, which includes people giving their ethnicity as "New Zealander". English was spoken by 98.6%, Māori language by 15.3%, and other languages by 4.2%. No language could be spoken by 1.4% (e.g. too young to talk). The percentage of people born overseas was 5.6, compared with 28.8% nationally.

Religious affiliations were 30.6% Christian, 13.9% Māori religious beliefs, and 2.8% other religions. People who answered that they had no religion were 44.4%, and 6.9% of people did not answer the census question.

Of those at least 15 years old, 24 (14.8%) people had a bachelor's or higher degree, 90 (55.6%) had a post-high school certificate or diploma, and 42 (25.9%) people exclusively held high school qualifications. The median income was $29,200, compared with $41,500 nationally. 9 people (5.6%) earned over $100,000 compared to 12.1% nationally. The employment status of those at least 15 was that 90 (55.6%) people were employed full-time, 18 (11.1%) were part-time, and 3 (1.9%) were unemployed.

== Education ==
Paparore School is a contributing primary (years 1–6) school. It has a decile rating of 3 and a roll of 169 as of March 2026. There was a native school in the area in 1915.
