= Pamapuria =

- Interactive map of Pamapuria
- Coordinates: 35°7′57″S 173°21′4″E
- Country: New Zealand
- Region: Northland Region
- District: Far North District
- Ward: Te Hiku
- Community: Te Hiku
- Subdivision: Kaitāia
- Electorates: Northland; Te Tai Tokerau

Government
  - Territorial Authority: Far North District Council
  - Regional council: Northland Regional Council
  - Mayor of Far North: Moko Tepania
  - Northland MP: Grant McCallum
  - Te Tai Tokerau MP: TBD

Area
  - Total: 3.72 km^{2} (1.44 sq mi)

Population (2023 Census)
  - Total: 171
  - Density: 46.0/km^{2} (119/sq mi)

Pamapuria is a locality in Northland, New Zealand. It lies on State Highway 1 about 10 km east of Kaitaia.

== Demographics ==
Pamapuria is in an SA1 statistical area which covers 3.72 km^{2} (1.44 sq mi). The SA1 area is part of the larger Rangitihi statistical area.

Historical population for Pamapuria
Year	Pop.	±% p.a.
2006	123	—
2013	135	+1.34%
2018	174	+5.21%
2023	171	−0.35%

The SA1 statistical area had a population of 171 in the 2023 New Zealand census, a decrease of 3 people (−1.7%) since the 2018 census, and an increase of 36 people (26.7%) since the 2013 census. There were 81 males, and 90 females in 54 dwellings. 3.5% of people identified as LGBTIQ+. The median age was 39.5 years (compared with 38.1 years nationally). There were 36 people (21.1%) aged under 15 years, 30 (17.5%) aged 15 to 29, 78 (45.6%) aged 30 to 64, and 30 (17.5%) aged 65 or older.

People could identify as more than one ethnicity. The results were 42.1% European (Pākehā), 78.9% Māori, and 1.8% Pasifika. English was spoken by 96.5%, Māori language by 26.3%, Samoan by 1.8% and other languages by 3.5%. No language could be spoken by 1.8% (e.g. too young to talk). The percentage of people born overseas was 3.5, compared with 28.8% nationally.

Religious affiliations were 35.1% Christian, 10.5% Māori religious beliefs, and 1.8% other religions. People who answered that they had no religion were 40.4%, and 15.8% of people did not answer the census question.

Of those at least 15 years old, 21 (15.6%) people had a bachelor's or higher degree, 81 (60.0%) had a post-high school certificate or diploma, and 39 (28.9%) people exclusively held high school qualifications. The median income was $29,300, compared with $41,500 nationally. 3 people (2.2%) earned over $100,000 compared to 12.1% nationally. The employment status of those at least 15 was that 60 (44.4%) people were employed full-time, 24 (17.8%) were part-time, and 3 (2.2%) were unemployed.

=== Rangitihi statistical area ===
The Rangitihi statistical area covers 84.54 km^{2} (32.64 sq mi) and had an estimated population of 1,050 as of June 2025, with a population density of 12 people per km^{2}.

Historical population for Rangitihi
Year	Pop.	±% p.a.
2006	810	—
2013	819	+0.16%
2018	936	+2.71%
2023	1,008	+1.49%

Rangitihi had a population of 1,008 in the 2023 New Zealand census, an increase of 72 people (7.7%) since the 2018 census, and an increase of 189 people (23.1%) since the 2013 census. There were 513 males, 489 females and 6 people of other genders in 360 dwellings. 2.1% of people identified as LGBTIQ+. The median age was 41.9 years (compared with 38.1 years nationally). There were 198 people (19.6%) aged under 15 years, 174 (17.3%) aged 15 to 29, 447 (44.3%) aged 30 to 64, and 192 (19.0%) aged 65 or older.

People could identify as more than one ethnicity. The results were 67.6% European (Pākehā); 56.0% Māori; 3.6% Pasifika; 2.4% Asian; 0.9% Middle Eastern, Latin American and African New Zealanders (MELAA); and 1.5% other, which includes people giving their ethnicity as "New Zealander". English was spoken by 95.8%, Māori language by 15.5%, Samoan by 0.3% and other languages by 4.8%. No language could be spoken by 1.8% (e.g. too young to talk). New Zealand Sign Language was known by 0.9%. The percentage of people born overseas was 9.2, compared with 28.8% nationally.

Religious affiliations were 35.4% Christian, 5.7% Māori religious beliefs, 0.3% Buddhist, 0.6% New Age, 0.3% Jewish, and 0.9% other religions. People who answered that they had no religion were 46.7%, and 10.7% of people did not answer the census question.

Of those at least 15 years old, 81 (10.0%) people had a bachelor's or higher degree, 471 (58.1%) had a post-high school certificate or diploma, and 231 (28.5%) people exclusively held high school qualifications. The median income was $33,100, compared with $41,500 nationally. 36 people (4.4%) earned over $100,000 compared to 12.1% nationally. The employment status of those at least 15 was that 390 (48.1%) people were employed full-time, 120 (14.8%) were part-time, and 21 (2.6%) were unemployed.

== Education ==
Pamapuria School is a coeducational full primary (years 1–8) school with a roll of 99 as of July 2026. The school was established as a native school in 1884. In 2012, the school's deputy principal, James Parker, was arrested under, and pleaded guilty to, 49 charges of child molestation. As a result of Parker's arrest, the incumbent principal, Stephen Hovell, was dismissed from his position.
