= Te Kao =

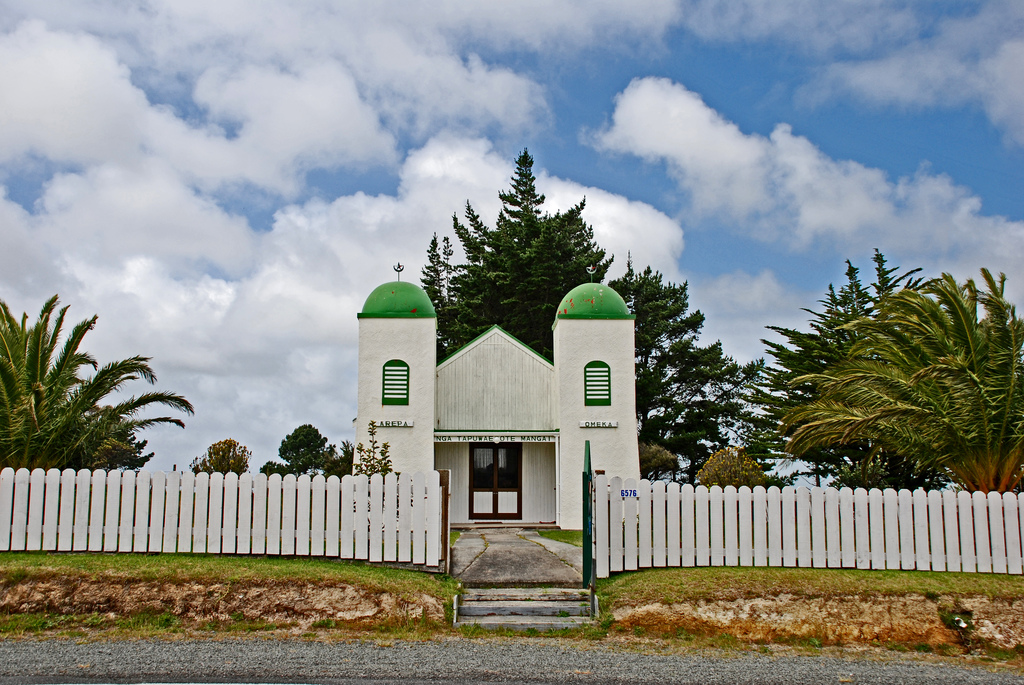
- The Rātana Church at Te Kao is characterised by bell towers at each of the front corners, which bear the words "Arepa" and "Omeka" (Māori transliterations of the Greek words Alpha and Omega – the beginning and the end)
- Interactive map of Te Kao
- Coordinates: 34°39′05″S 172°58′13″E
- Country: New Zealand
- Region: Northland Region
- District: Far North District
- Ward: Te Hiku
- Community: Te Hiku
- Subdivision: North Cape
- Electorates: Northland; Te Tai Tokerau

Government
  - Territorial Authority: Far North District Council
  - Regional council: Northland Regional Council
  - Mayor of Far North: Moko Tepania
  - Northland MP: Grant McCallum
  - Te Tai Tokerau MP: Mariameno Kapa-Kingi

Te Kao is a village on the Aupōuri Peninsula of Northland, New Zealand. Te Aupōuri are mana whenua (tribe with traditional authority over a territory) over Te Kao and the surrounding district, and it is the principal settlement of the iwi (tribe). Te Aupōuri's Post-Settlement Governance Entity, Te Runanga Nui o Te Aupōuri, has an office at Te Kao, along with the iwi's marae and urupa. State Highway 1 passes through the district. Cape Reinga is 46 km to the north, and Houhora is 24 km to the south. The Aupōuri Forest and Ninety Mile Beach are to the west.

The New Zealand Ministry for Culture and Heritage gives a translation of "the dried kūmara" for Te Kao.

The athlete Te Houtaewa, of Te Aupōuri, started his legendary run along Ninety Mile Beach at Te Kao.

== Demographics ==
Te Kao is in an SA1 statistical area which covers 58.95 km^{2} (22.76 sq mi) and includes the area between the mouth of Parengarenga Harbour and Tauwhia Stream. The SA1 area is part of the larger North Cape statistical area.

Historical population
Year	Pop.	±% p.a.
2013	105	—
2018	156	+8.24%
2023	183	+3.24%

The SA1 statistical area had a population of 183 in the 2023 New Zealand census, an increase of 27 people (17.3%) since the 2018 census, and an increase of 78 people (74.3%) since the 2013 census. There were 87 males, and 96 females in 66 dwellings. 1.6% of people identified as LGBTIQ+. The median age was 32.6 years (compared with 38.1 years nationally). There were 48 people (26.2%) aged under 15 years, 39 (21.3%) aged 15 to 29, 69 (37.7%) aged 30 to 64, and 27 (14.8%) aged 65 or older.

People could identify as more than one ethnicity. The results were 24.6% European (Pākehā); 88.5% Māori; 11.5% Pasifika; 4.9% Asian; 1.6% Middle Eastern, Latin American and African New Zealanders (MELAA); and 3.3% other, which includes people giving their ethnicity as "New Zealander". English was spoken by 96.7%, Māori language by 49.2%, and other languages by 3.3%. The percentage of people born overseas was 4.9, compared with 28.8% nationally.

Religious affiliations were 32.8% Christian, and 32.8% Māori religious beliefs. People who answered that they had no religion were 31.1%, and 4.9% of people did not answer the census question.

Of those at least 15 years old, 12 (8.9%) people had a bachelor's or higher degree, 81 (60.0%) had a post-high school certificate or diploma, and 42 (31.1%) people exclusively held high school qualifications. The median income was $33,800, compared with $41,500 nationally. 6 people (4.4%) earned over $100,000 compared to 12.1% nationally. The employment status of those at least 15 was that 66 (48.9%) people were employed full-time, 15 (11.1%) were part-time, and 9 (6.7%) were unemployed.

== Marae ==
Pōtahi Marae, near the centre of Te Kao, is the traditional meeting place for Te Aupōuri, and includes the wharehui (meeting house) Waimirirangi and wharekai (dining hall) Te Rongopātūtaonga.

In October 2020, the Government committed $220,442 from the Provincial Growth Fund to upgrade the marae, creating 9 jobs.

== Education ==
Te Kura o Te Kao is a coeducational full primary (years 1–8) school with a roll of 88 students as of July 2026.

The school started as Te Kao Native School in 1881. It became Te Kao Area School, providing education up to seventh form, but with few secondary students it changed to become a primary school in 1999.

The school celebrated its 125th anniversary during Labour Weekend in 2006. It became a designated character school at the start of 2019, and extended to include years 9 and 10 in 2020.
