= Penetana Papahurihia =

Penetana Papahurihia (died 1875), also called Te Atua Wera ("the fiery God"), was a Māori tohunga, war leader and prophet. He belonged to Ngā Puhi, by way of the Te Hikutu and Ngāti Hau hapū. In 1833, he founded a religious cult called Te Nakahi around the Bay of Islands and Omanaia, and later served as a spiritual advisor to Hone Heke.

== Early life ==
Papahurihia's early life is uncertain, but his parents were allegedly matakite (seers), capable of divination and teleportation. It is possible that he attended the Anglican missions at Rangihoua, where he learned to read and developed his understanding of the Bible. The historical record first attests to him in 1833 when Richard Davis, a missionary from Te Waimate mission, encountered his followers at Taiamai. He was later told by the chief Te Morenga that the people of Taiamai had begun to worship a God called Papahurihia. A year later, Henry Williams gave the first description of their beliefs, which had spread along the Kawakawa river and had adherents at Kororareka, including Tītore and Waikato.

== Nakahi ==
Papahurihia claimed to have been visited by the snake from the Book of Genesis, who demanded to be worshipped. The snake was known as Nakahi (from the Hebrew nahash, meaning "serpent"). He established a religion which incorporated both Māori and Judeo-Christian beliefs; Nakahi was identified as a ngarara, a kind of taniwha, and its followers, believing themselves to be descended from the ten lost tribes of Israel, called themselves Hurai (Jews) and observed the Jewish Sabbath. They were baptised and would gather around a flagpole at night to worship Nakahi, who would appear to them.

The Hurai believed in an abundant heaven, described by Catholic missionary Louis Catherin Servant as "... the land of happiness, the residence of those who are good. You feel there neither the rigours of cold, nor of hunger or thirst; you enjoy unending light. Everything is found in plenty, flour, sugar, guns, ships; there too murder and sensual pleasure reign." The evil, such as the non-believing missionaries and those who slandered Nakahi, would burn in a fire. Papahurihia used the metaphor of a tree: only his followers could ascend the straight tree to the sky, while others would move along curved branches and fall into a fiery abyss, lit by Nakahi. Historian Keith Sinclair characterised his teachings as millenarian, though Judith Binney claimed otherwise.

Papahurihia also communed with the dead, possibly using ventriloquy to make a "whistling sighing" sound. The Wesleyan reverend William Woon, who visited the Hokianga in 1836, said that Papahurihia claimed to be able to raise the dead, but Judith Binney disputes that such a claim was ever made.

== Hokianga ==
In November 1834 he moved to the Hokianga to spread his teachings. He debated the missionary William White on theological matters at Waima in April 1835, but for the next few years, his influence seemed to wane. In 1837, he took the name Te Atua Wera ("the fiery God"). He was sympathetic to the Catholics in the Hokianga, but disliked Protestants.

Several of his followers, acting under the chiefs Kaitoke and Pi, engaged in the ritual killings of Protestant missionaries and converts at Te Hikutu and Te Puna. A popular story circulated that Te Atua Wera had given Kaitoke an enchanted musket that would make him invulnerable, but the British captured him after a number of skirmishes anyway. James Busby blamed chief Waikato for instigating hostilities; he had supposedly given them the muskets to carry out the attacks. To restore utu for the capture of Kaitoke.

== Flagstaff War ==
In 1843, he claimed to be controlling a large comet which had appeared in the sky; this was seen as an omen of war. Two years later, at the outbreak of the Flagstaff War, Te Atua Wera became a spiritual advisor to Hone Heke. Nakahi would speak to Hone Heke through Te Atua Wera, promising Heke his warriors would not be harmed in battle, so long as they observed both the rites of their ancestors and the European god. During a battle at Puketutu, Nakahi blew away the fire of a Congreve rocket, saving Heke's life. Te Atua Wera was also present at the Battle of Ohaeawai, where he made divinations from the scalp of the dead Lieutenant George Phillpotts and composed two songs, one of which foretold victory against the British.

== Later life ==
After the war, Papahurihia lived upriver from Omanaia. He was regularly visited by John Webster, a Scottish settler and businessman, and Maxime Petit, a Catholic priest. In the 1850s his anti-Protestant stance had softened, and he was converted to Christianity by Aperahama Taonui. His baptiser was Thomas Buddle. Thereafter he took the name Penetana and ran a school at Rawene in 1859 alongside Taonui. He was later made a warden of police and an assessor by the government in 1861. A government report in 1866 described him as a minor chief, though highly influential, who was loyal to the government.

He was consulted by Māori during the Taranaki and Waikato wars as to their outcome. After speaking with the dead, he predicted a stalemate.

He died on 3 November 1875, and was buried at Omanaia by William Rowse, a Wesleyan minister. A later tohunga, Hone Riiwi Toia, communed with his spirit during the Dog Tax War in 1898. Toia established a cult known as Whiowhio (literally "whistling"), inspired by the strange whistling voice in which Nakahi would speak to the Hurai.
