= Albert Park Volcano =

Former volcano in New Zealand

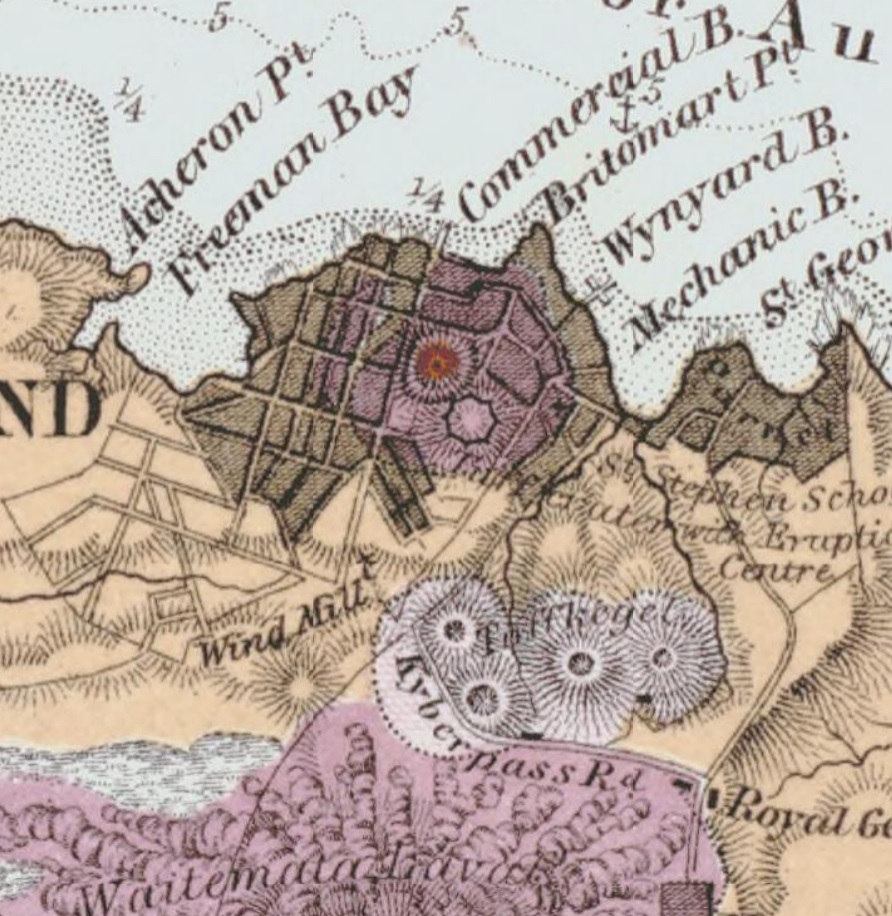
- Ferdinand von Hochstetter's diagram of the Albert Park Volcano, superimposed onto the 1859 township of Auckland

Highest point
- Coordinates: 36°50′55″S 174°46′02″E

Geography
- Location within North Island Location within New Zealand
- Location: Auckland, North Island, New Zealand

Geology
- Volcanic field: Auckland volcanic field

The Albert Park Volcano was one of the volcanoes in the Auckland volcanic field in New Zealand. A small volcano that erupted approximately 145,000 years ago, the volcanic remnants were quarried during the early colonial history of Auckland between 1840 and 1869. The volcano was dwarfed by the pre-volcanic sandstone ridge of Albert Park directly to the south-east, and only recognised as volcanic by Ferdinand von Hochstetter when he visited Auckland in 1859.

== Geology ==
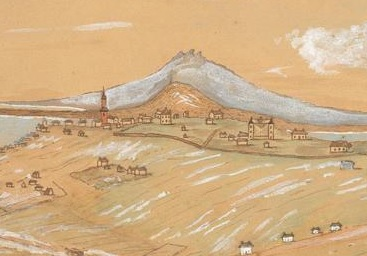
The approximate location of the Albert Park Volcano, to the north-west of the Albert Barracks, depicted in 1849. Maungauika / North Head and Rangitoto Island in background.

The volcano erupted an estimated 145,000 years ago. The initial phase began with wet, explosive eruptions that deposited up to 8 metres of a thick ash layer around the Queen Street Valley area. Later eruptions changed to a dry fountaining style, allowing a small scoria mound to form. A lava flow from the western base of the cone flowed down the Queen Street Valley, which dammed the Waihorotiu Stream and formed a swamp where the stream met the Waitematā Harbour, creating an alluvial flat between Victoria Street and Wellesley Street, near the modern location of Aotea Square.

== History ==
The area to the north-west of Albert Park was known as Rangipuke to Tāmaki Māori, and was the location of the kāinga. European settlers began to live in the Queen Street Valley in 1840, after the signing of the Treaty of Waitangi and Auckland being chosen as the new capital for the colony. Scoria from the volcano began to be used to help build roads in the central city, founded adjacent to the volcano.

Most information about the volcano comes from an early description by surveyor Ferdinand von Hochstetter, who visited Auckland in 1859 and recognised the volcanic nature of the upper Albert Park area. By 1869, almost all surface-level scoria from the cone had been quarried away by early settlers.

In the 1870s, when major sewer work around the Albert Barracks was being undertaken, contractors discovered a Leptospermum scoparium (mānuka) tree stump, imbedded in clay and but covered in stratified layers of volcanic ash. When the Albert Park tunnels were being constructed during World War II, it was noted that scoria was only present at the northern sides of the park and not the southern.

In 2006, a planned extension of the Auckland Art Gallery was temporary halted due to objections made by the Auckland Volcanic Cones Society, however a geological report found that the planned extensions were in ash-blanketed areas, and not the scoria cone remnants itself.
