= Albert Park, Auckland =

Public park in Auckland, New Zealand

Albert Park
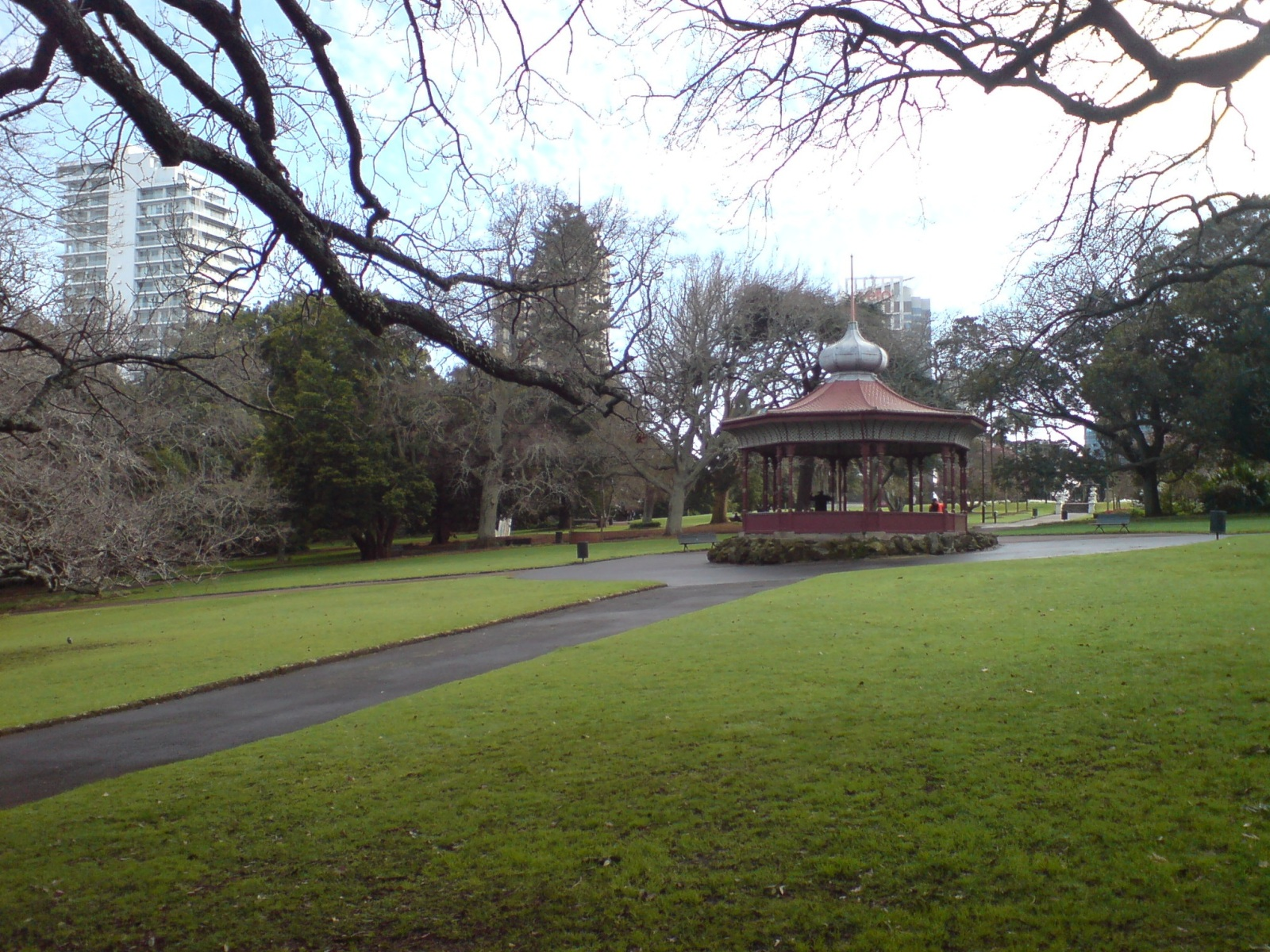
- The band rotunda near the south end of the park
- Interactive map of Albert Park
- Type: Urban park
- Location: Auckland, New Zealand
- Coordinates: 36.8507°S 174.7675°E
- Created: 1880s
- Operator: Auckland Council
- Status: Open all year, 24 hours

Albert Park is a public park in central Auckland, bounded by Wellesley Street East, Princes Street, Bowen Avenue and Kitchener Street. From the entrance at the corner of Bowen Ave and Kitchener St, sealed footpaths climb steeply through a variety of trees to the large flat area at the summit, where a formal layout of paths and flower gardens encircle a fountain. Albert Park is home to many large trees, some dating to the 1800s, including ombú and pōhutukawa of a similar age to those in the nearby Emily Place Reserve.

== History ==
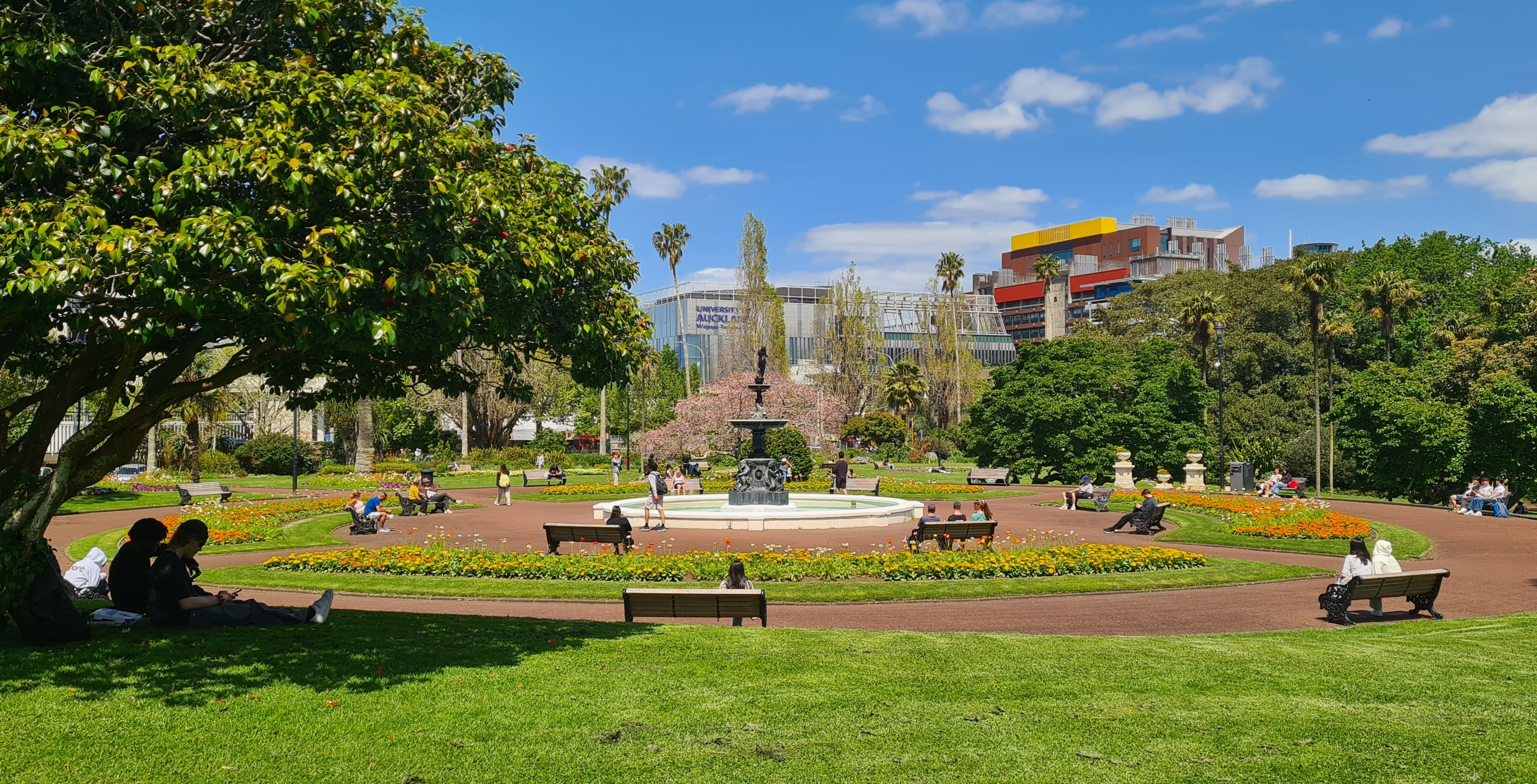
Fountain area viewed from north-west

While Albert Park is formed from sandstone, to the north-west of the park is the Albert Park Volcano, a scoria cone which erupted approximately 145,000 years ago and blanketed much of Albert Park in ash. Albert Park is the location of a Māori kāinga (village) known as Rangipuke, with a defended pā located at the park's northwest named Te Horotiu Pā. Albert Park was the location of a Waiohua settlement called Mangahekea, sacked in the 1740s by Ngāti Whātua.

Albert Park occupies much of the site of the Albert Barracks, one of Auckland's early European military fortifications. In the 1850s and 1860s, Albert Barracks to many soldiers including those of the 58th Regiment. The barracks consisted of a number of wooden and masonry structures standing in an enclosed area surrounded by a rock fortification built of the local volcanic stone. A portion of this wall remains visible in the adjacent University of Auckland grounds, and is registered by Heritage New Zealand as a Category I historic place.

The Park was set aside as a reserve in the 1870s, and developed as a park in the 1880s. It originally had commanding views over the city and harbour. The view now is of modern office blocks, except where mature trees have hidden the buildings. The park contains a number of interesting specimen trees, with over 80 species planted between 1874 and 1908. A caretaker's residence was provided which still stands on the eastern side of the part adjacent to Princes Street. After 1906 this Gothic-styled cottage was occupied by the City Park Superintendent Thomas Pearson, who died here in 1931. It is currently empty.

The park's layout and design have not greatly changed since 1882. Due to the park's proximity to the University of Auckland, it is a popular location for students to relax.

== Features ==
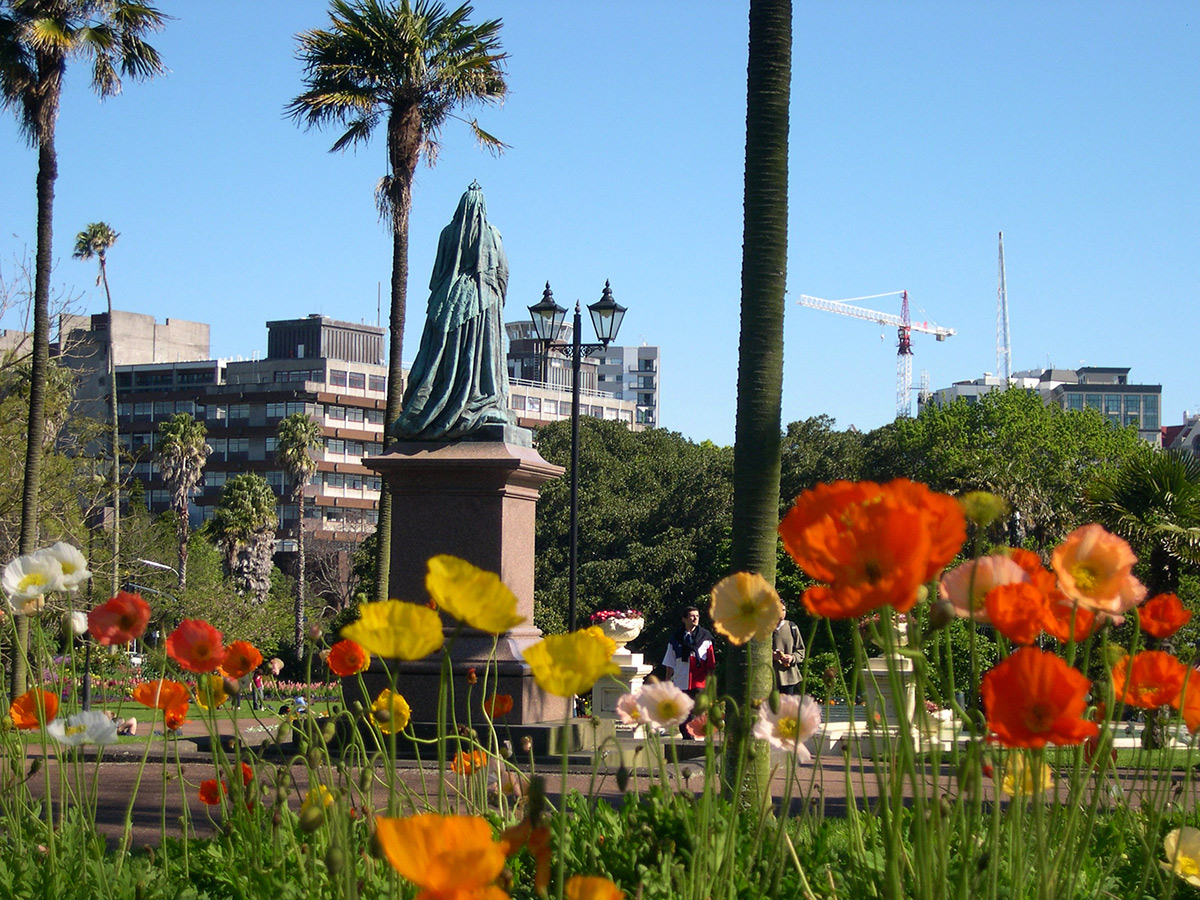
The statue of Queen Victoria

The design of the park was the result of a public competition and follows a formal layout with a main north-south axis. To the north of the axis is a bronze statue by Francis J Williamson of Queen Victoria (1897); to the south is a bandstand. The bandstand is a Category 2 historic place. Built in 1900–1901 it was first used in 1901 for a memorial after the death of Queen Victoria and subsequently used for civic gatherings and brass band concerts. Between the statue and bandstand is a large cast iron fountain imported from Great Britain in 1881 which forms the centrepiece of the park. The fountain is distinguished by statues of dolphins ridden by cherubs blowing horns that spout water. The fountain is surmounted by Aphrodite that also has a horn spouting water.

The statue of Queen Victoria was one of several similar sculptures installed by municipal authorities throughout the British Empire following the monarch's Diamond Jubilee in 1897. This sculpture was cast in London and unveiled with considerable ceremony here as part of the Jubilee celebrations. The red granite pedestal is intact but the ensemble originally included a cast iron ornamental fence that has been removed.

There are several other artworks and memorials in the park, including a marble Boer War memorial, and an over life-size marble statue of Sir George Grey also by F J Williamson that was relocated here from its original site outside the Auckland Town Hall. There are two Edwardian marble edifices near the band rotunda, one being Andrea Carlo Lucchesi's Love breaking the sword of hate (1900) and the other a memorial drinking fountain. Many of these memorials and artworks can be seen in the numerous images of Albert Park printed as postcards since the early 20th century.

Near the flagpole and Boer War Memorial on the north side of the park are two large field guns that were once part of the defence system set up during the Russian Invasion Scare of the 1880s. Near the Princes Street exit in front of the University of Auckland clock tower is a large floral clock that was constructed in 1953 with funds donated by Robert Laidlaw, founder of the Farmers department store chain, (this was intended to commemorate the 1953 visit of Queen Elizabeth the Second). Near the Art Gallery is a large modern sculpture from the 1990s called 'Tilt'. Surprisingly an operating Victorian Gas Lamp survives in the Park, on the stairs leading from Kitchener Street.

Beneath the park are the extensive Albert Park tunnels. They were built in 1941 to be used as air raid shelters, but were decommissioned and sealed up before World War II ended. The tunnels were largely forgotten for many years and, although periodically over the last decades there are calls for them to be opened up, nothing has happened (probably purely for logistical reasons). There were large tunnel entrances at the top of Victoria Street, adjacent to the Art Gallery on Wellesley Street and from Constitution Hill. One can still be seen on Kitchener Street between Courthouse and Bacons Lane.

== Climate ==
Climate data for Albert Park (1981–2010)
Month	Jan	Feb	Mar	Apr	May	Jun	Jul	Aug	Sep	Oct	Nov	Dec	Year
Mean daily maximum °C (°F)	23.8 (74.8)	24.2 (75.6)	23.0 (73.4)	20.3 (68.5)	18.0 (64.4)	15.6 (60.1)	14.9 (58.8)	15.4 (59.7)	16.9 (62.4)	18.3 (64.9)	19.9 (67.8)	22.2 (72.0)	19.4 (66.9)
Daily mean °C (°F)	20.0 (68.0)	20.6 (69.1)	19.2 (66.6)	16.8 (62.2)	14.7 (58.5)	12.4 (54.3)	11.5 (52.7)	12.1 (53.8)	13.5 (56.3)	14.7 (58.5)	16.3 (61.3)	18.5 (65.3)	15.9 (60.5)
Mean daily minimum °C (°F)	16.2 (61.2)	16.9 (62.4)	15.3 (59.5)	13.4 (56.1)	11.4 (52.5)	9.2 (48.6)	8.1 (46.6)	8.8 (47.8)	10.1 (50.2)	11.1 (52.0)	12.7 (54.9)	14.8 (58.6)	12.3 (54.2)
Average rainfall mm (inches)	84.0 (3.31)	61.0 (2.40)	95.6 (3.76)	92.3 (3.63)	91.0 (3.58)	106.3 (4.19)	114.0 (4.49)	126.8 (4.99)	100.1 (3.94)	85.7 (3.37)	90.7 (3.57)	89.3 (3.52)	1,136.8 (44.75)
Source: NIWA

== Gallery ==
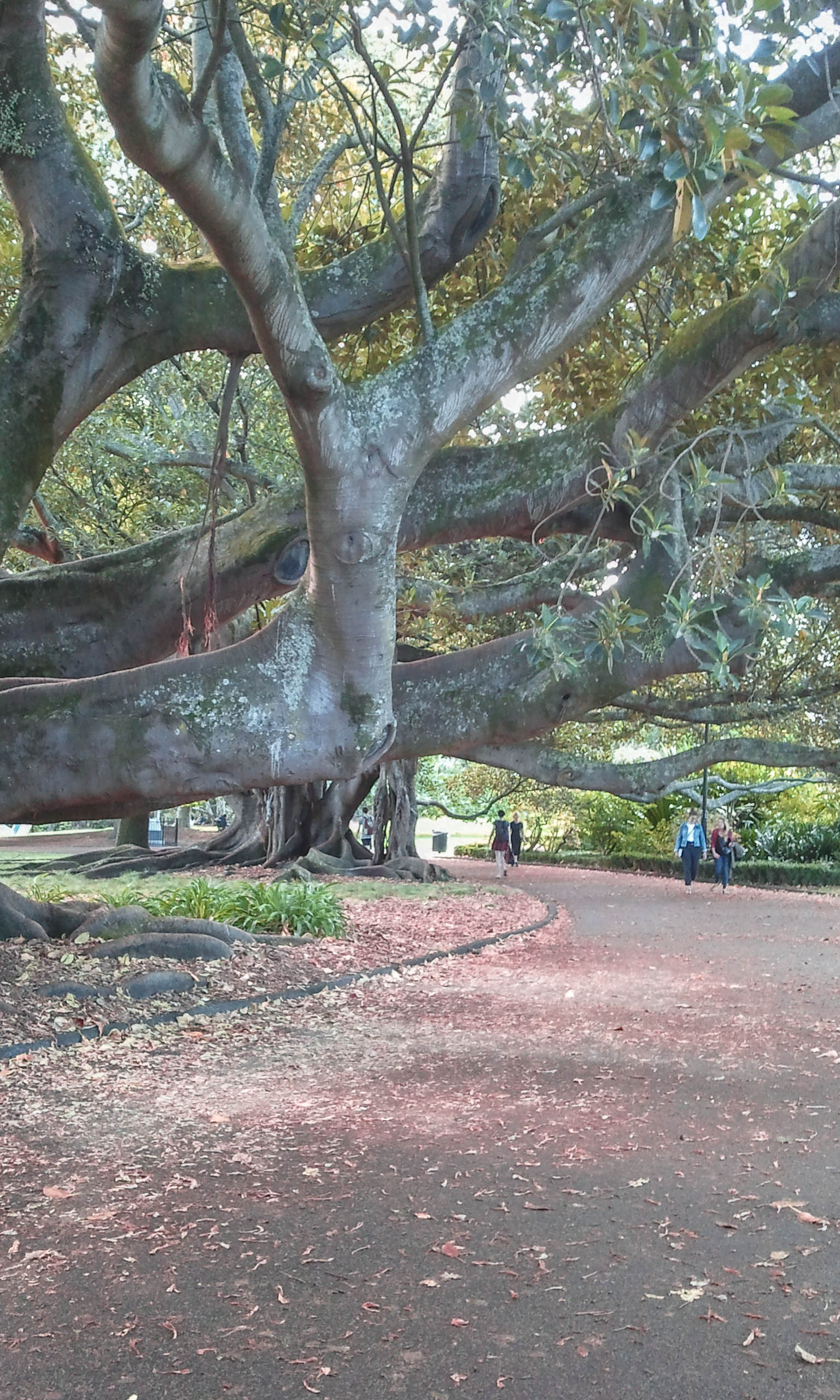
View from Princes Street

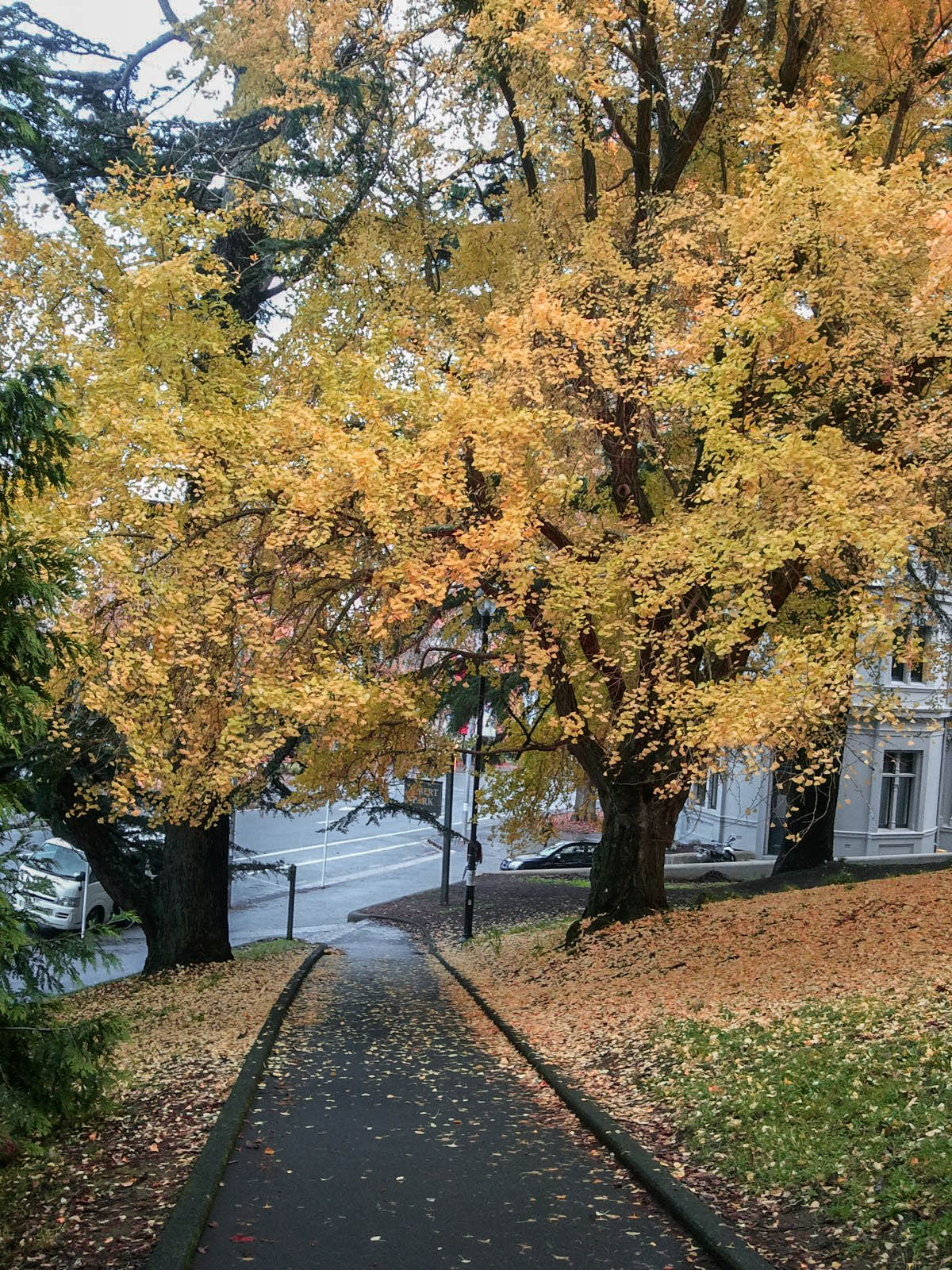
View towards Wellesley Street

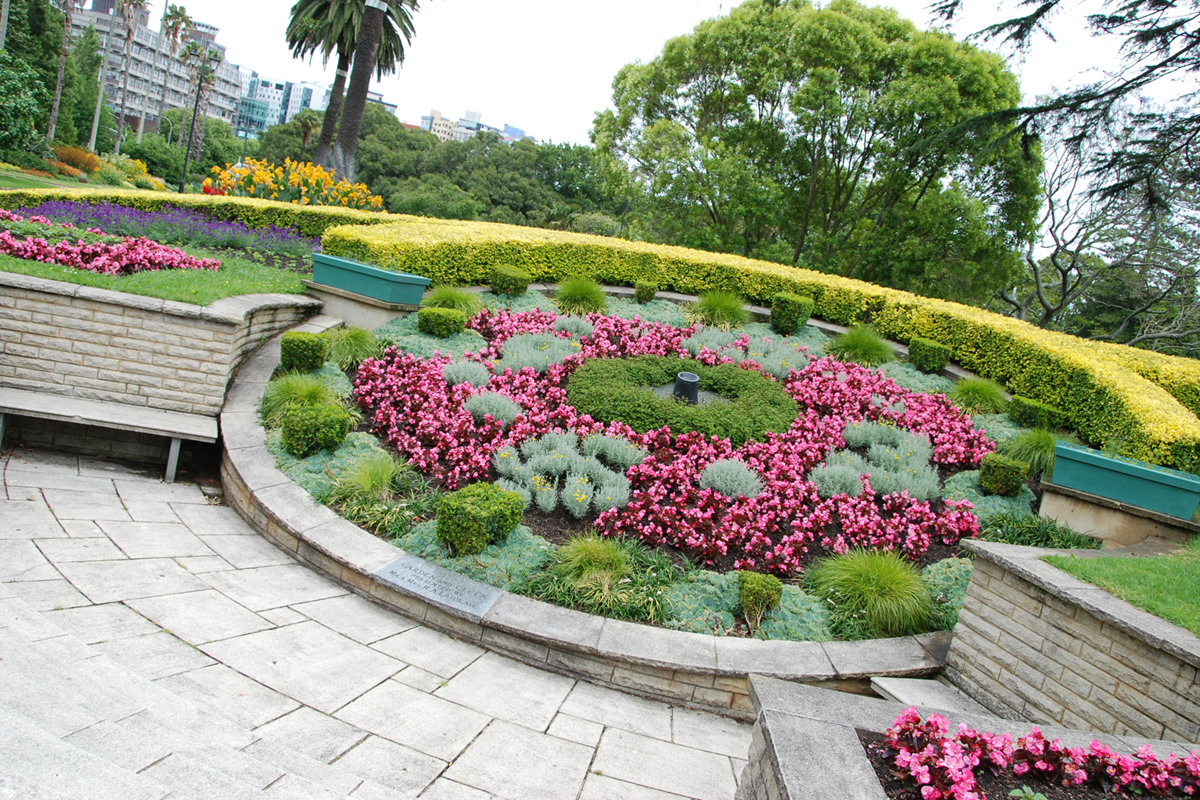
Floral clock

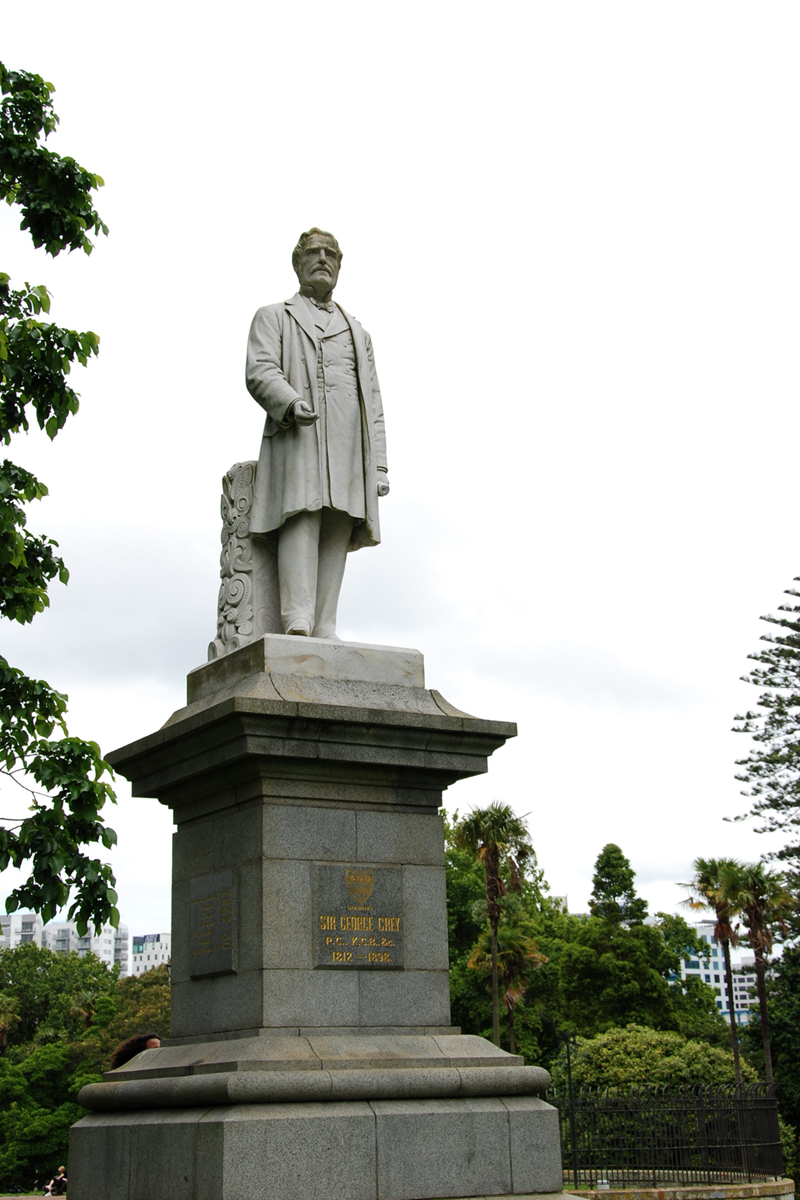
Sir George Grey statue

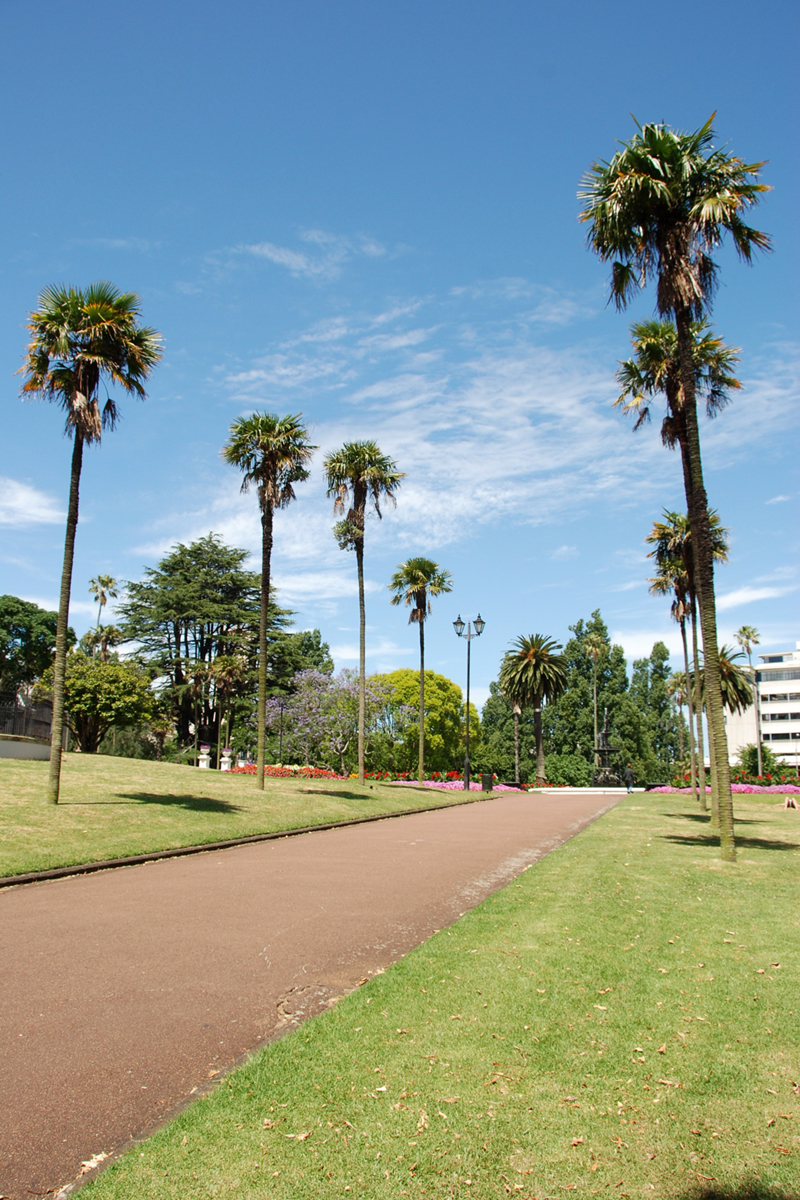
South-east view

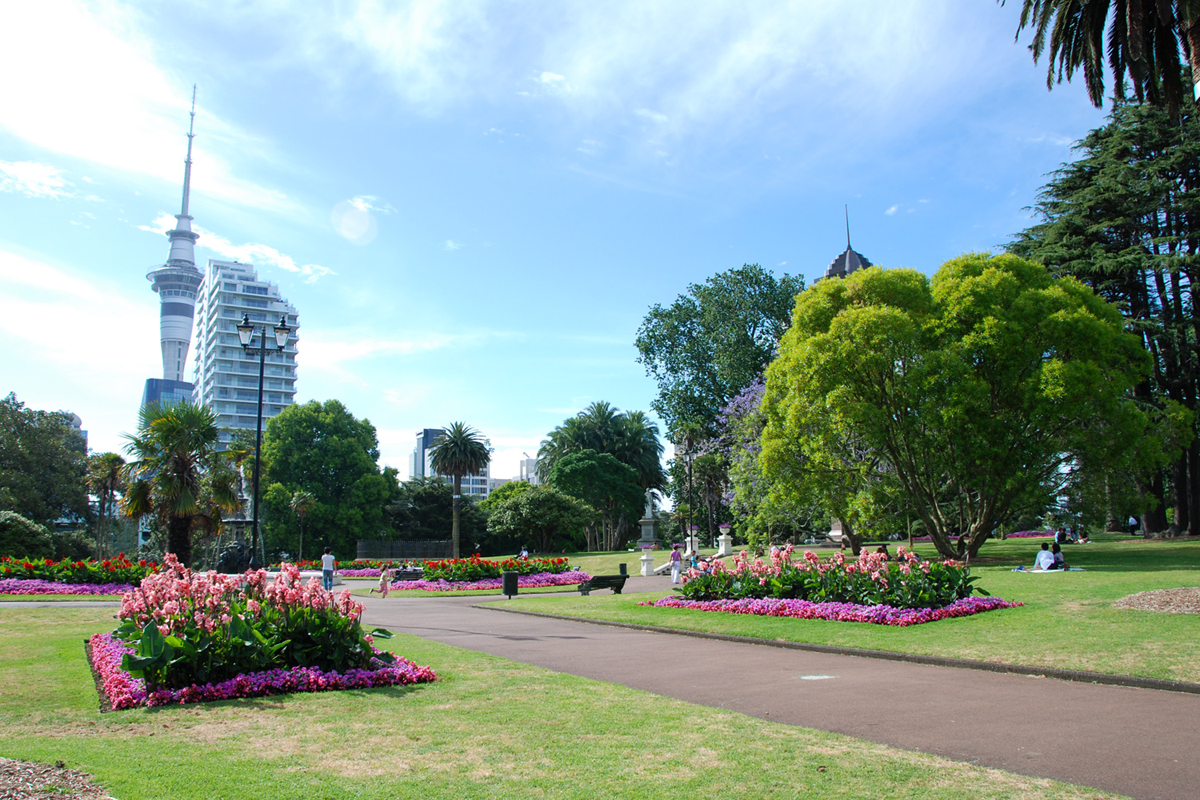
North-west view

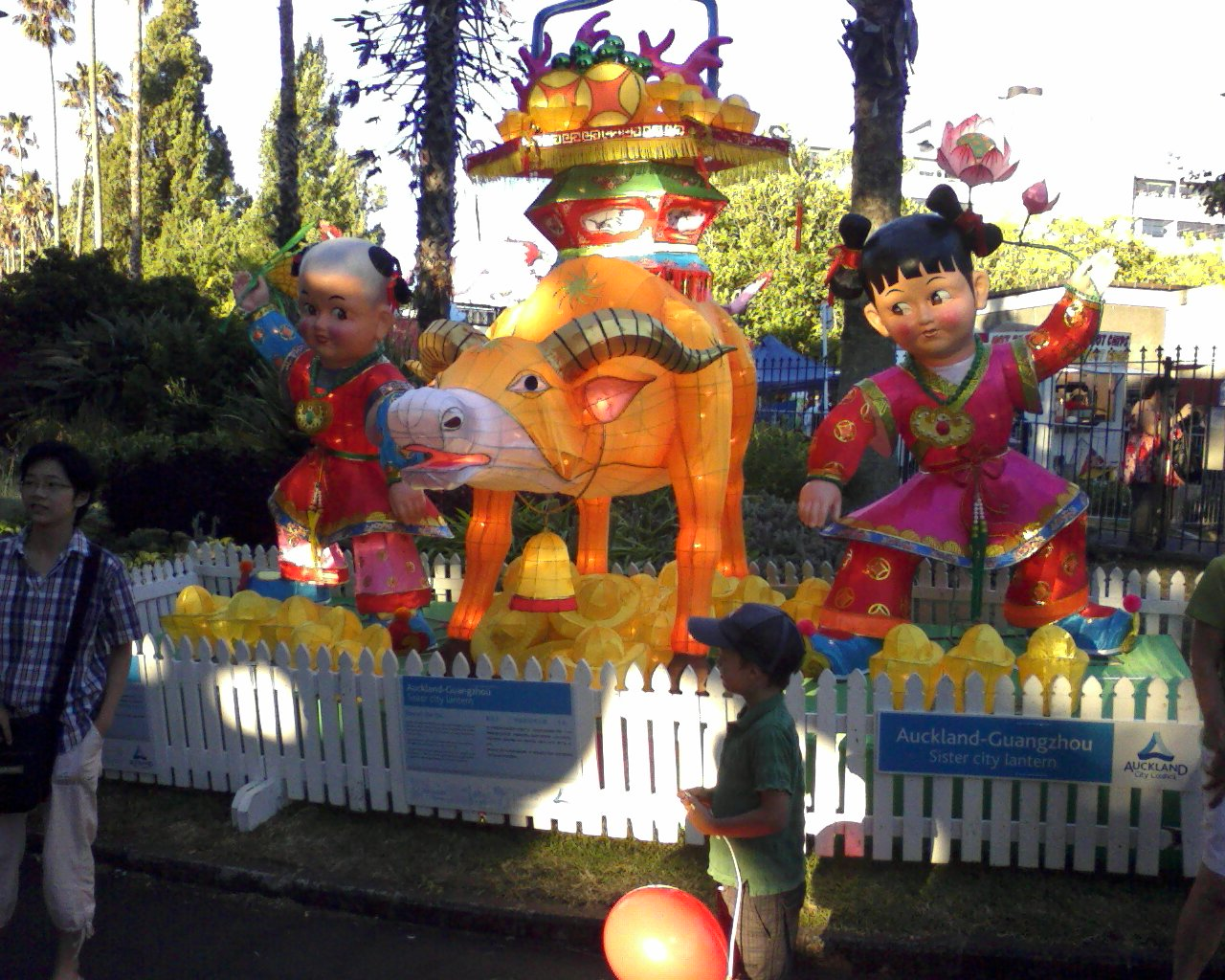
Auckland Lantern Festival 2009

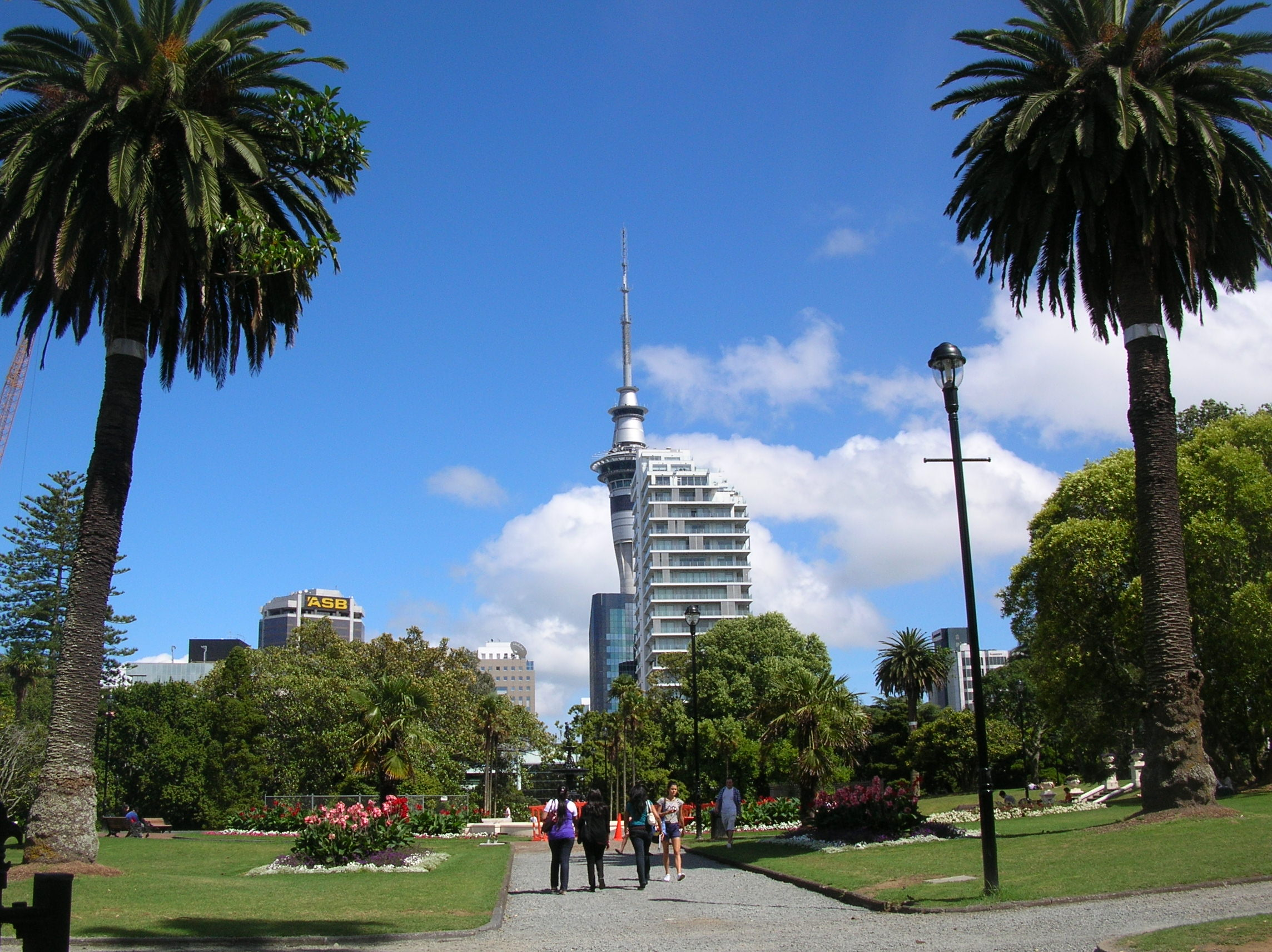
Two phoenix palms frame a view of the Sky Tower

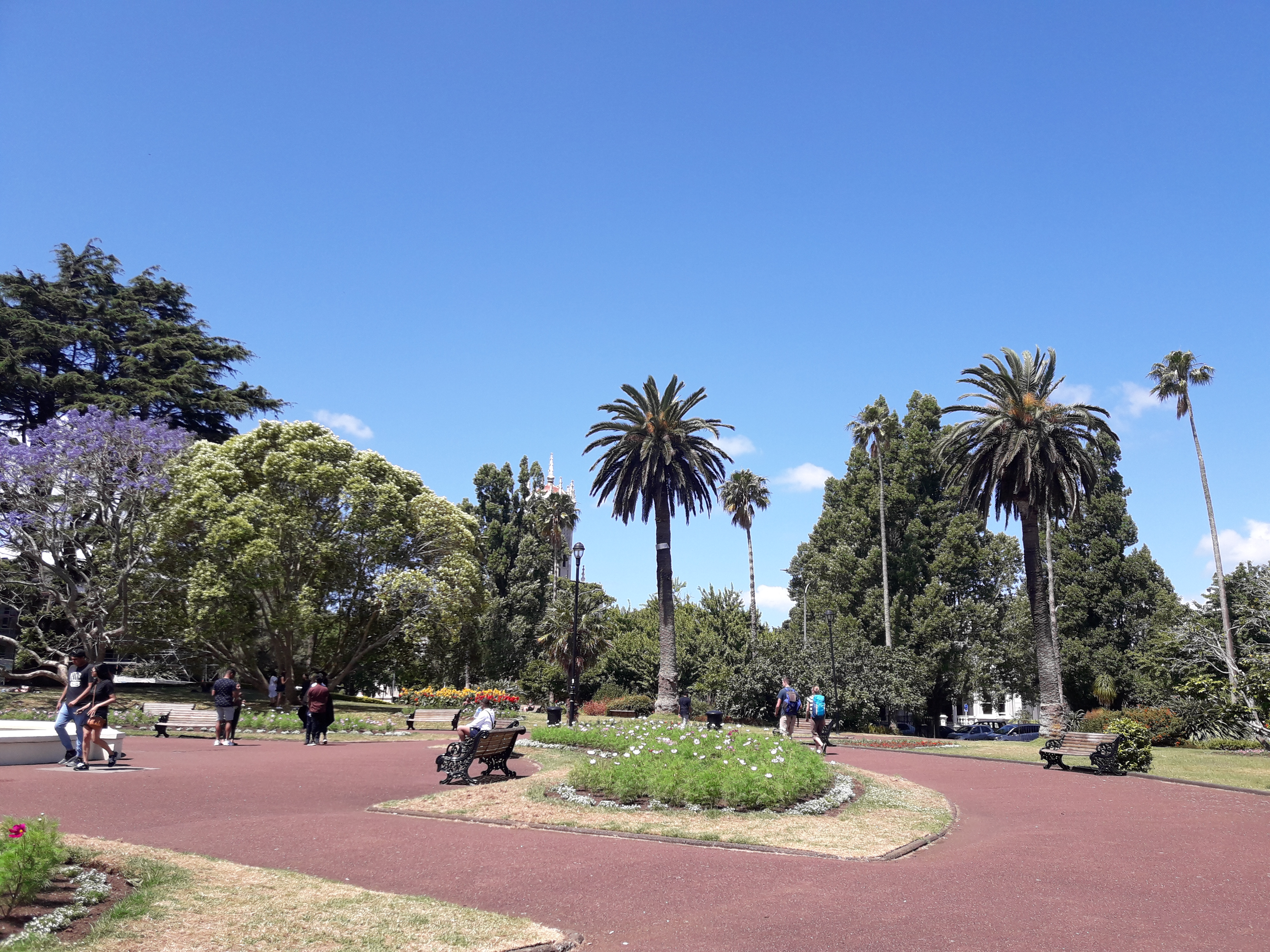
Albert Park in early summer
