= South African War Artillery Memorial =

Commemorative monument in Albert Park, Auckland, New Zealand

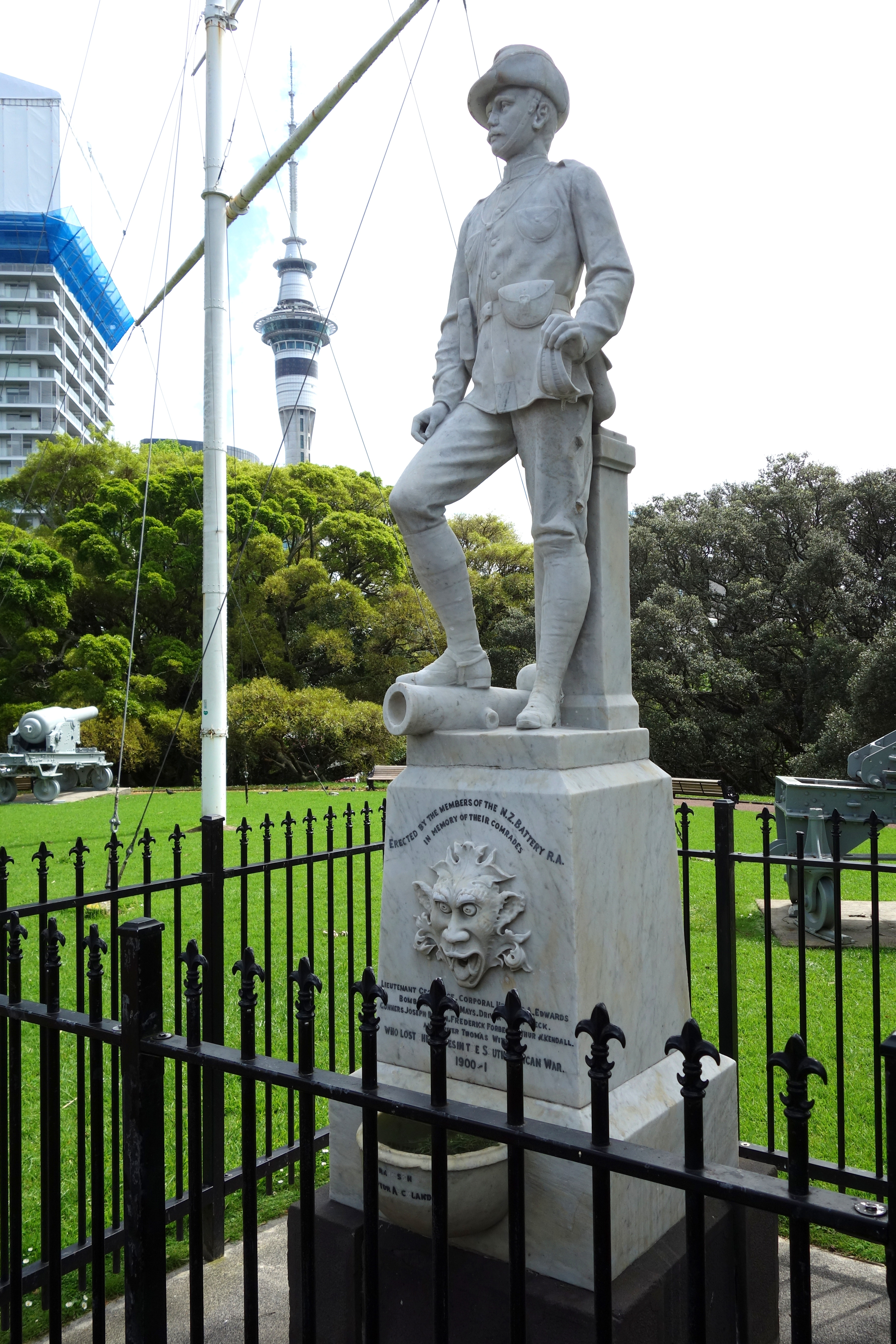
- Interactive map of South African War Artillery Memorial
- Location: Albert Park, 33-43 Princes Street, Auckland
- Coordinates: 36°50′59.64″S 174°46′4.04″E
- Designer: W. Parkinson and Co.
- Type: Statue
- Material: White Marble (Sculpture and Pedestal) Bluestone (Base)
- Inauguration date: 25 October 1902
- Dedicated to: Fallen Members of the 1st NZ Battery in the Rhodesian Field Force Artillery.
- Website: Heritage New Zealand

Heritage New Zealand – Category 2
- Designated: 11 November 1981
- Reference no.: 556

The South African War Artillery Memorial is a commemorative monument located in Albert Park, Auckland. Unveiled on 25 October 1902 by Premier Richard John Seddon, it honours the New Zealand artillerymen who served and died during the South African War (1899–1902). The memorial is unique among New Zealand's South African War monuments as it depicts an artillery trooper rather than the more common representation of mounted riflemen.

Featuring a life-sized marble statue and an inscribed drinking fountain, the memorial was erected by returned soldiers of the Fourth and Fifth Contingents of the 1st New Zealand Battery. The statue was listed on the Heritage New Zealand list of historic sites as a Category 2 place (reflecting places of "historical or cultural heritage significance or value") in 1981.

== Background ==
=== 1st New Zealand Battery of the Fifth Contingent ===
The Fifth New Zealand Contingent, largely composed of reserves enlisted during the early months of 1900, was formed at the request of the British Government. It was distinct from the previous Contingent, known as the Fourth Contingent, and earned the nickname the "New Zealand Imperial Bushmen," as opposed to the Fourth’s "New Zealand Bushmen." This distinction highlighted the Contingent's connection to Imperial forces, and the title "Bushmen" was used to align with Australian units of the same name.

Raised, equipped, and paid entirely by the British Government, the Fifth Contingent sailed from New Zealand on 31 March 1900, with the majority of men departing in the Maori, Waimate, and Gymeric. The Contingent was led by Lieutenant-Colonel Stuart Newall, an experienced officer from the New Zealand Wars.

Once in camp at Marandellas, General Frederick Carrington called for volunteers to form a battery of six 15-pounder guns for the Rhodesian Field Force Artillery. Captain Charles T. Major, who commanded one of the companies within the Fifth Contingent, offered the entire company of Aucklanders to form the core of this artillery unit. The group, supplemented by a few men from other companies of the Fifth Contingent and about twenty men from the Fourth Contingent, came together to form the 1st New Zealand Battery under the command of Major E. W. M. Powell. This new formation marked the beginning of the 1st New Zealand Battery’s service, and it became a distinct and separate unit from the rest of the Fifth Contingent, which was organised into four squadrons (A, B, C, and D) for mounted infantry operations.

Initially, it accompanied General Carrington on an attempt to relieve Lieutenant-Colonel Hore, and it saw its first action in early August 1900 at Elands River. The left section of the Battery joined Lord Methuen's forces on 29 October, remaining at Lichtenburg until May 1901. During the Boer attack on Lichtenburg in March 1901, the Battery fought fiercely and was involved in the movement through Ottoshoop, Lichtenburg, and Rustenburg to Zeerust. At Zeerust, the right section was detached and remained part of the garrison, while the center section continued with Carrington's brigade until reaching Klerksdorp, later being stationed at Koekoemoer on garrison duties.

The Battery along with the wider Fourth and Fifth Contingents recuperated in the town of Worcester and left for Cape Town, where they embarked on the SS Tagus on 12 June. The Tagus arrived at Port Chalmers on 11 July and both Contingents were disbanded on the 21 July 1901.

== Creation of the memorial ==
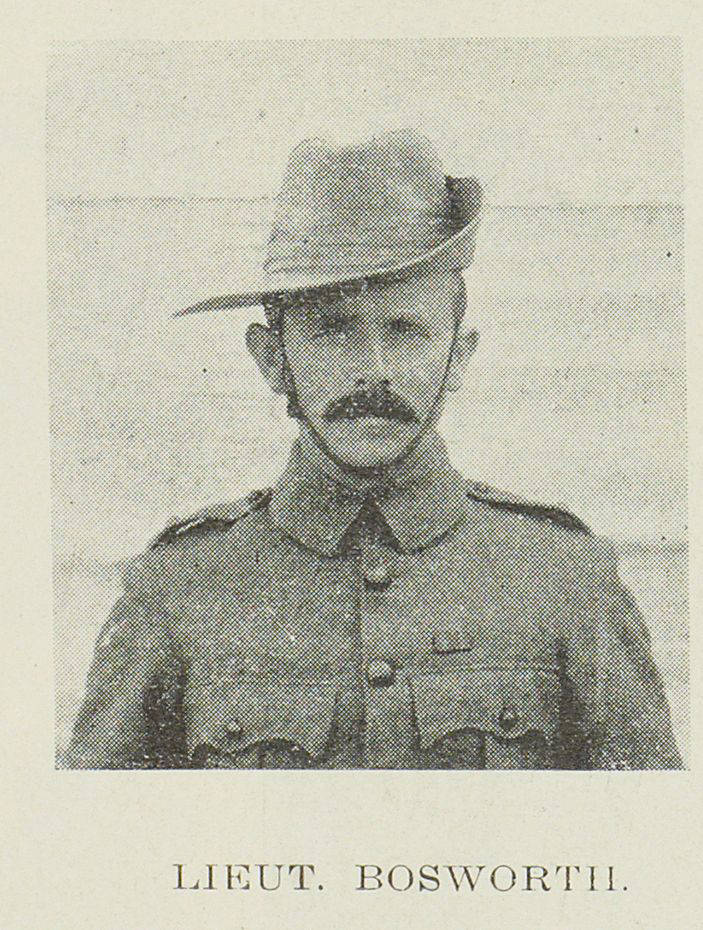
Lieutenant J T Bosworth in full uniform, 1902

=== Conception and Funding ===
The conception of the South African War Artillery Memorial can be traced back to the efforts of the returned soldiers of the 1st New Zealand Battery. These men, primarily from the Fifth Contingent, sought to honour their fallen comrades who had died in action or succumbed to illness during the conflict. The memorial was conceived as a way to remember their service and sacrifice, as well as to recognise the role played by the New Zealand artillery in the war. The memorial was funded entirely by funded by returned members of the Fifth Contingent.

Lieutenant J.T. Bosworth, a veteran of the Fifth Contingent, was instrumental in advocating for the memorial. Upon his return to New Zealand, he led the initiative to have a commemorative monument erected in Auckland, ensuring that it would feature an artilleryman rather than the more typical rifleman that adorned many South African War memorials. Bosworth's vision was to depict the artillery unit’s unique contribution, marking a departure from the more commonly seen representations of mounted soldiers.

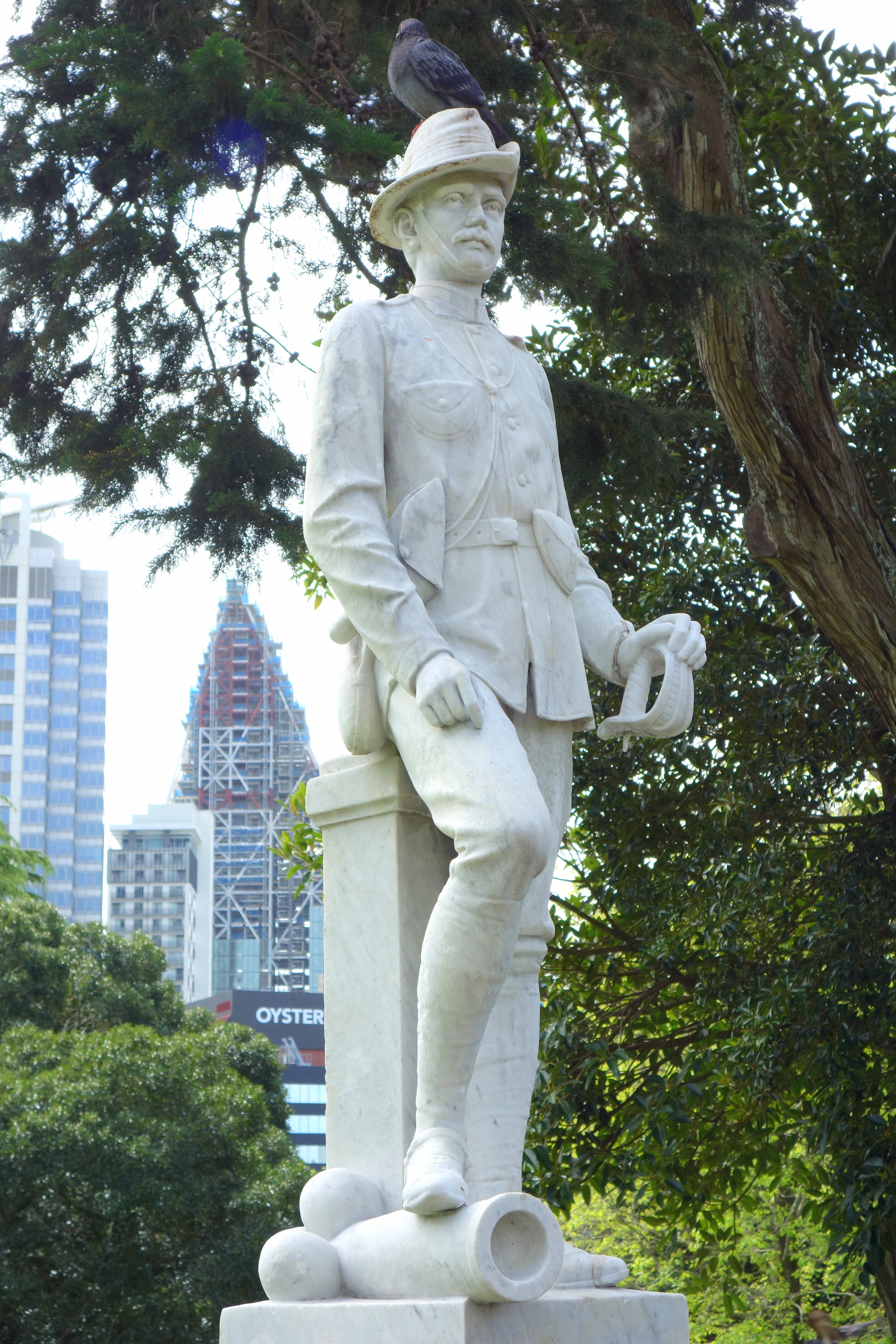
A front-facing view of the war memorial's trooper, atop a cannon in Albert Park, 2024

=== Design and Features ===
The South African War Artillery Memorial is distinguished by its unique design, which deviates from the more common representation of mounted riflemen in New Zealand’s South African War monuments. The life-size statue is situated on a marble pedestal, which itself is placed upon a bluestone base.

The statue depicts a standing trooper in Khaki drill complete with the Australian style slouch hat, representative of the uniform worn by artillerymen during the South African War. The trooper is shown in a relaxed pose, with his left hand holding a sword and his right hand resting on a revolver pouch, reflecting the typical armament of an artilleryman. He is also equipped with a haversack, a water-bottle, and other standard field gear. The trooper stands atop a broken cannon and artillery shells. The base and pedestal also functioned initially as a water fountain. The lion head and the bowl of the drinking fountain remain intact, but the water supply has been disconnected.

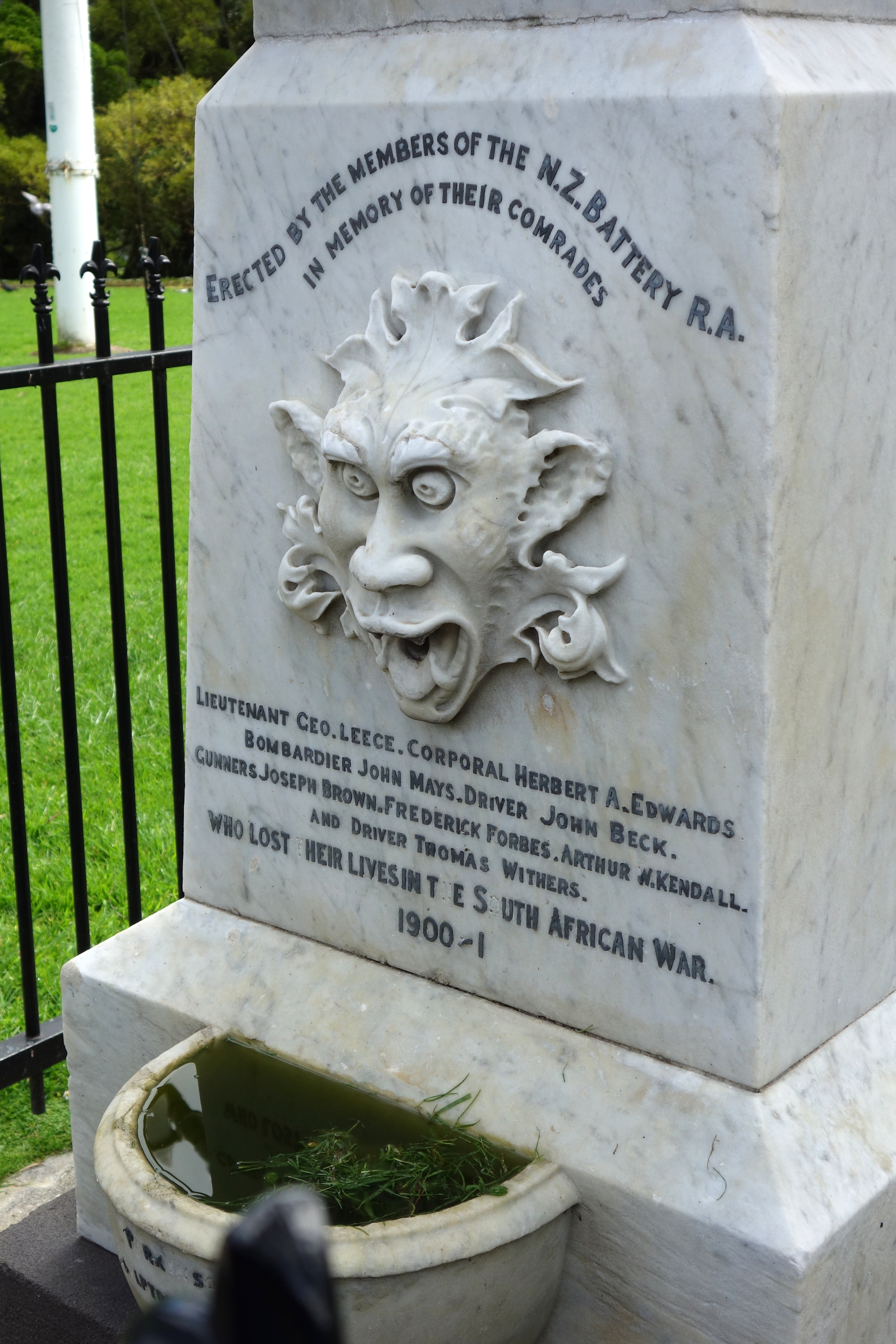
A view of the Lion's face and drinking fountain with inscription, 2024

The Memorial was erected and inscribed by William Parkinson's monumental masonry firm, though the marble Statuary, which had been ordered through a British intermediary, was of Italian origin and likely came from Carrara, Tuscany. Changes to the monument over time include the addition of railings after 1986, and the removal and replacement of the trooper's head, left hand and sword.

The memorial features an inscription that commemorates the bravery and sacrifice of New Zealand soldiers who served and died during the Second Boer War. The primary inscription on the monument reads:

"Erected by members of the NZ Battery R.A., In memory of their comrades, Lieutenant Geo. Leece, Corporal Herbert A. Edwards, Bombardier John Mays, Driver John Beck, Gunners Joseph Brown, Frederick Forbes, Arthur W. Kendall, and Driver Thomas Withers. Who lost their lives in the South African War, 1900-1."

== Unveiling ceremony ==
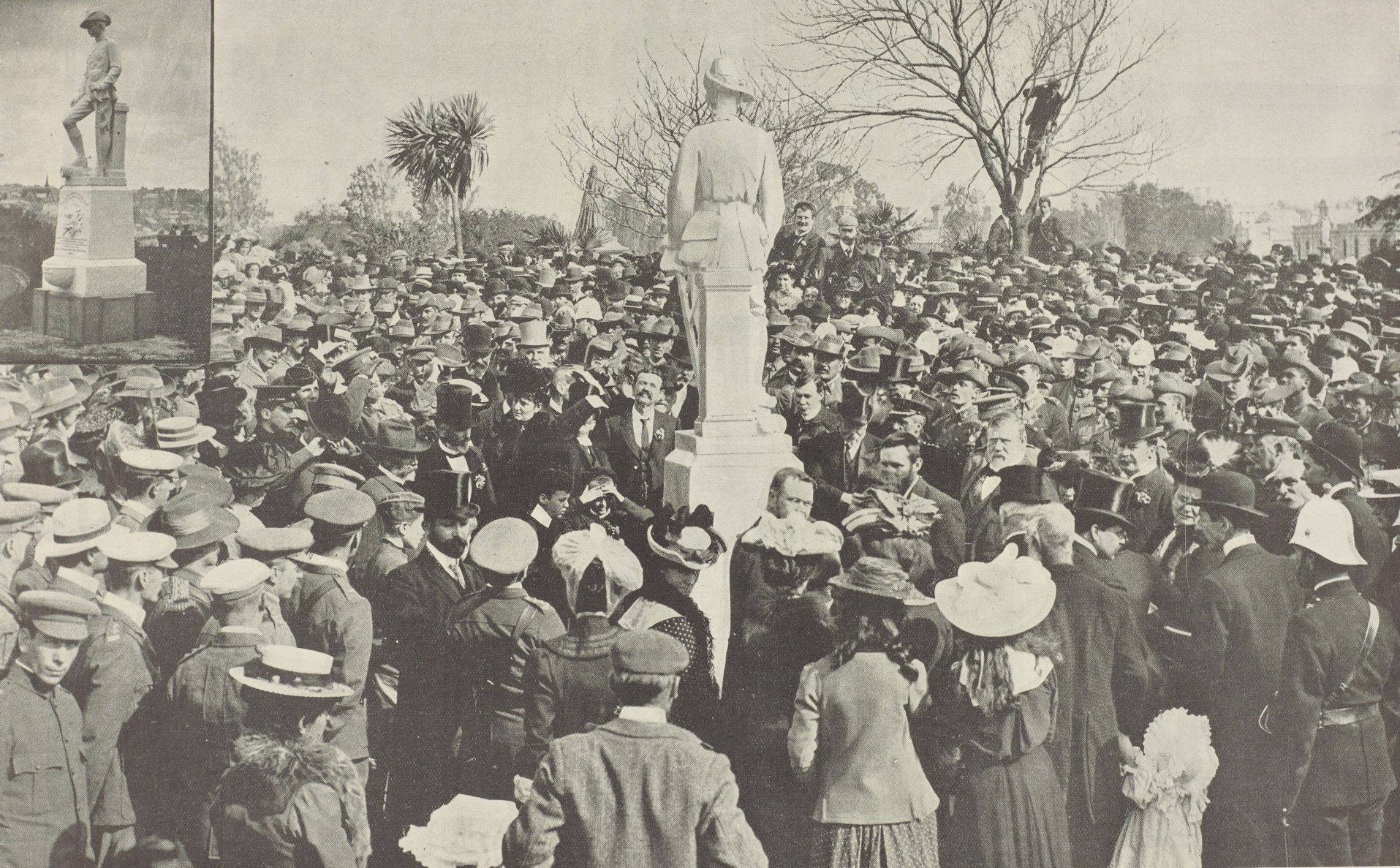
Richard Seddon unveiling the Fifth Contingent Memorial in Albert Park, Auckland, 25 October 1902

On the afternoon of 25 October, 1902, a ceremony was held to unveil the Boer War Memorial in Albert Park, Auckland, commemorating the soldiers of the New Zealand Battery who lost their lives during the conflict. Premier Richard Seddon, and several other notable officials, attended the event. Other dignitaries present included the Mayor of Auckland, Alfred Kidd, Sir Joseph Ward, Colonel Thomas William Porter, and Lieutenant Colonel Richard Hutton Davies, among others. Also in attendance were returned officers from the New Zealand Battery and others who had served in the war.

The ceremony began with the arrival of the Premier's party from Queens Street. Upon reaching the memorial, Lieutenant Bosworth, a prominent figure in the New Zealand Battery and one of the leading forces behind the memorial’s creation, asked Seddon to unveil the monument. Bosworth also recounted the heroism and sacrifices of the soldiers commemorated. He specifically mentioned Lieutenant Leece, who was killed while leading his column into battle, Corporal Edwards, who was killed in an accidental mine explosion, and several others who fell during the conflict, including those who succumbed to illness.

Premier Seddon addressed the gathered crowd, emphasizing the honour and duty of those who had served and died in the Boer War. He highlighted the importance of the memorial as a tribute not only to the fallen soldiers but also to their families and the wider New Zealand community. In his speech, Seddon expressed the nation's gratitude for the soldiers' courage, noting how their contributions were recognised by both King Edward VII and imperial military leaders, including General Kitchener. He stated that the memorial would serve as a lasting reminder of the sacrifices made for the Empire and the nation.

As Seddon finished his speech, he unveiled the memorial, removing the flag that had covered it. A moment followed when an elderly woman, likely the mother of a fallen soldier, pushed through the crowd to kiss the flag that had been draped over the monument. She then quietly withdrew, and the crowd stood in silence, with the volunteers saluting the memorial. A second salute was given in honour of the members of the New Zealand Battery who had organised and funded the monument’s erection, concluding the ceremony.

== Roll of honour ==
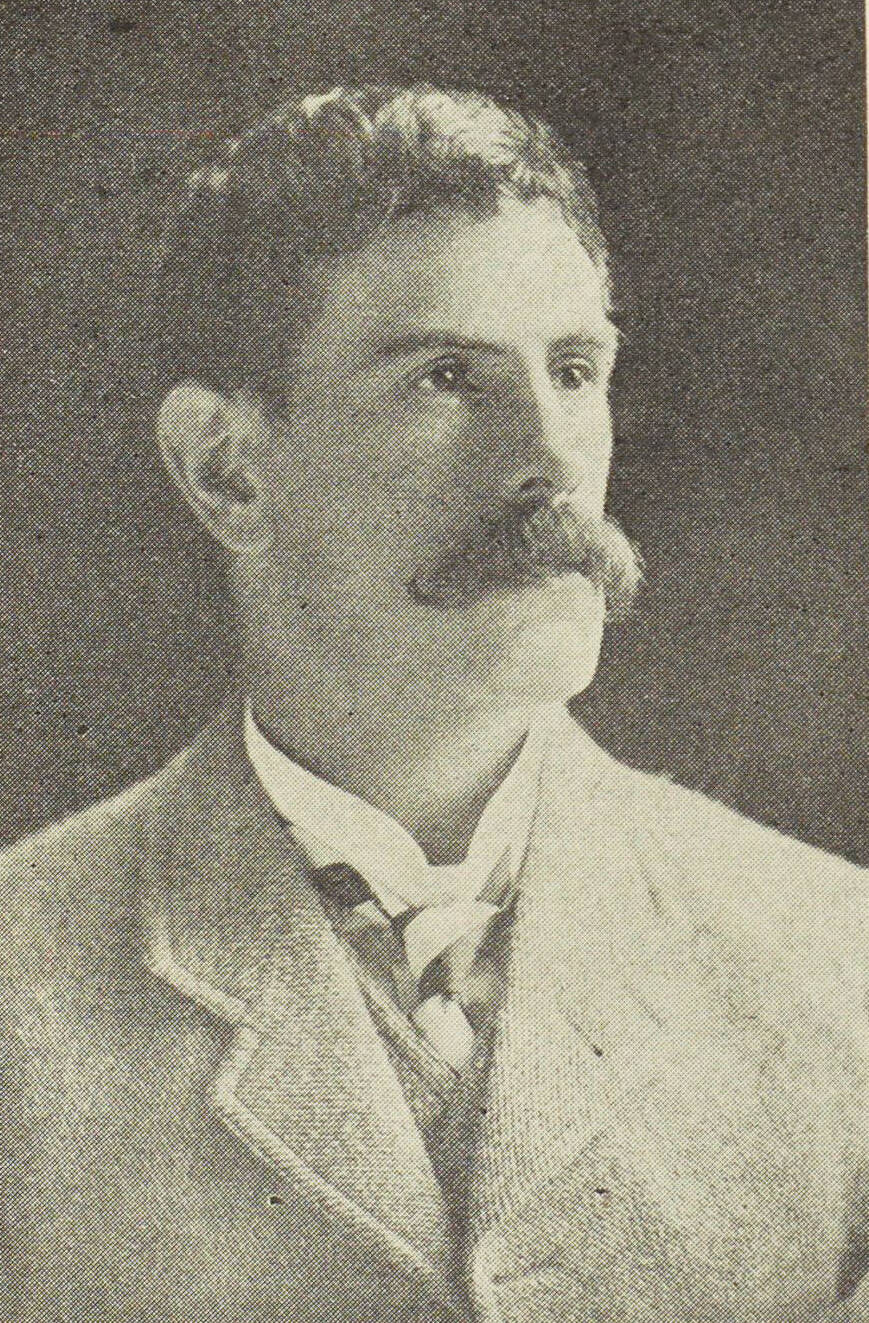
Portrait of G. Leece, circa 1900

=== Lieutenant George Leece ===
George Leece was born at Hothersall Manor, Lancashire, England on 24 November 1865. Leece attended Nelson College and was at the time of his enlistment engaged as a Surveyor, living in Parnell, Auckland. Leece enlisted for service with the Fifth Contingent in early March 1900 at Potters Paddock in the suburb of Epsom. Leece left New Zealand as a Corporal in the Auckland company aboard the steamer Maori on 31 March 1900.

Upon arrival in South Africa, Leece quickly rose to the rank of senior sergeant and, for a time, held the position of quartermaster. However, he resigned this post in order to join the fighting and see active service. After the New Zealand Battery completed its service, Leece chose to remain in South Africa, where he was given commission as a Lieutenant in the 7th Contingent.

In August, the 7th Contingent, joined a column commanded by Lieutenant-Colonel Garrett. On the 24 August, the column engaged an enemy convoy, killing three Boers, capturing eight more, and seizing numerous wagons and Cape carts. Despite being outnumbered by approximately 300 Boers, the Contingent repelled a fierce counterattack to reclaim the convoy after five hours of intense fighting. Lieutenant Leece was killed in the engagement.

Leece was buried at a Police Post 24 miles west of Vereeniging. Leece was awarded Queen's South Africa Medal, with the Cape Colony, Orange Free State, Transvaal, Rhodesia and South Africa 1901 campaign clasps.

=== Corporal Herbert A. Edwards ===
A farmer by trade, Edwards enlisted in Auckland, and was assigned to the New Zealand Battery of Artillery. At the time of his death, he was stationed in Zeerust, South Africa, where he was killed in an accidental mine explosion on 13 January 1901. While covering a trap mine with grass, a weight shifted on the lever used to fire the mines charge, causing an explosion that killed Edwards and Lieutenant A. R. Wallace of the 1st Battalion Loyal North Lancashire Regiment.

According to Lt. Bosworth, Edwards was 30 years old and a native of England, having previously worked as a seafaring man and was described as a "...good soldier, quick, and rough and ready". His military service was recognised with the Queen's South Africa Medal, which was awarded with campaign clasps for Cape Colony, Rhodesia, Transvaal, and South Africa 1901.

=== Bombardier John Mays ===
Born and raised in Devonport, Auckland, John Mays was the fourth son of Oliver Mays. He attended Auckland College and Grammar School before pursuing a career as a carpenter. Mays was known for his athleticism and community involvement in Devonport, excelling in football, rowing, and yachting. He enlisted in the Fifth Contingent, leaving New Zealand on March 31 1900 as a corporal in the Fifth Contingent's Auckland Company. Upon arrival in Rhodesia, the unit transitioned into a Horse Artillery Company, with Mays taking charge of one of the 15-pounder guns.

Mays saw extensive service in South Africa, participating in several significant campaigns, including the relief of Mafeking. He was noted for his bravery and was recommended for recognition following his actions during a cyclone shortly after the siege. At the time of the accident, Mays and his unit were preparing to leave Koekemoer for Cape Town, with plans to return to New Zealand. Mays died from a cerebral compression on 17 April 1901 after falling from his horse during a training jump.

His military service was recognised with the Queen's South Africa Medal, which was awarded with clasps for Cape Colony, Rhodesia, Transvaal, and South Africa 1901.

=== Driver John Beck ===
Beck was born 20 January 1878 in Hawke's Bay as Hans Jebsen Beck. He was the son of Mathias Peterson Beck and Anna Maria Hansen, Danish immigrants who arrived in Napier aboard the Fritz Reuter in 1874. Beck enlisted under the name "John Beck" on March 27, 1900, to serve with the Fifth New Zealand Contingent in South Africa.

Beck sustained a fatal wound during an engagement at Lichtenburg, South Africa, on March 3, 1901. The incident occurred during a Boer attack on the town. Beck had volunteered to cross an open area under fire to bring provisions to his unit stationed near the guns. On his return, he was struck by a bullet that passed through his leg, breaking the bone. Beck was taken to a field hospital where an attempt to save his leg was made. He initially began to make a recovery but died on 23 March from his wounds.

Beck was buried in Lichtenberg Cemetery. For his actions, Beck was awarded the Queen's South Africa Medal, with Cape Colony, Rhodesia, Transvaal, and South Africa 1901 campaign clasps.

=== Gunner Joseph Brown ===
Joseph Brown, listed as a Private on the nominal roll, was a Telegraph instructor from Hamilton and enlisted with the Fifth Contingent. Brown left New Zealand with the Auckland Company aboard the SS Maori on 31 March 1900.

While stationed in Lichtenburg, died from enteric fever after a brief illness lasting three weeks. He died 18 December 1900 and was buried the following morning in Lichtenburg cemetery. His illness was part of a larger outbreak that affected the area, with sixty cases of fever reported in a single week, attributed to the consumption of green peaches.

Brown was awarded the Queen's South Africa Medal, with clasps for the Cape Colony, Rhodesia and Transvaal campaigns.

=== Gunner Frederick Forbes ===
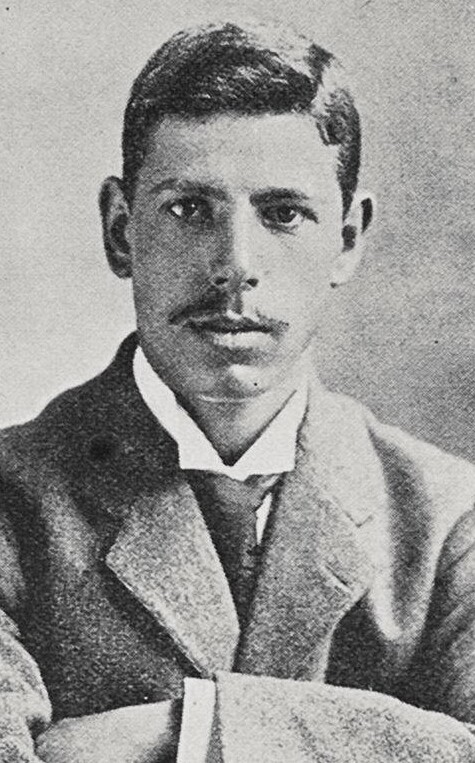
Gunner F. W. D. Forbes, 1901

Frederick William Duncan Forbes was born in Scotland and arrived in Dunedin with his widowed mother via Edinburgh in 1871. Just months after settling in the colony, Forbes mother took ill and died, leaving Forbes an orphan.

Forbes was adopted by his aunt, Mrs. Scott of Kelso, Scotland. Forbes initially pursued a career in law, spending several years working with a firm of solicitors in Kelso. However, a desire to travel and explore the colonies led him to New Zealand, where he took up mining. He worked with Monowai Gold Mining Company for over two years, later contributing to the Alpha and Chelmsford mines, as well as working as a tributer in Thames. Shortly before enlisting in the Fifth Contingent for service in South Africa, he had returned to Monowai.

Following the completion of the Fifth Contingents service in South Africa, Forbes boarded the Tagus. It was aboard the Tagus that Forbes fell ill with Pneumonia, where he died on 13 July 1901.

=== Gunner Arthur W. Kendall ===
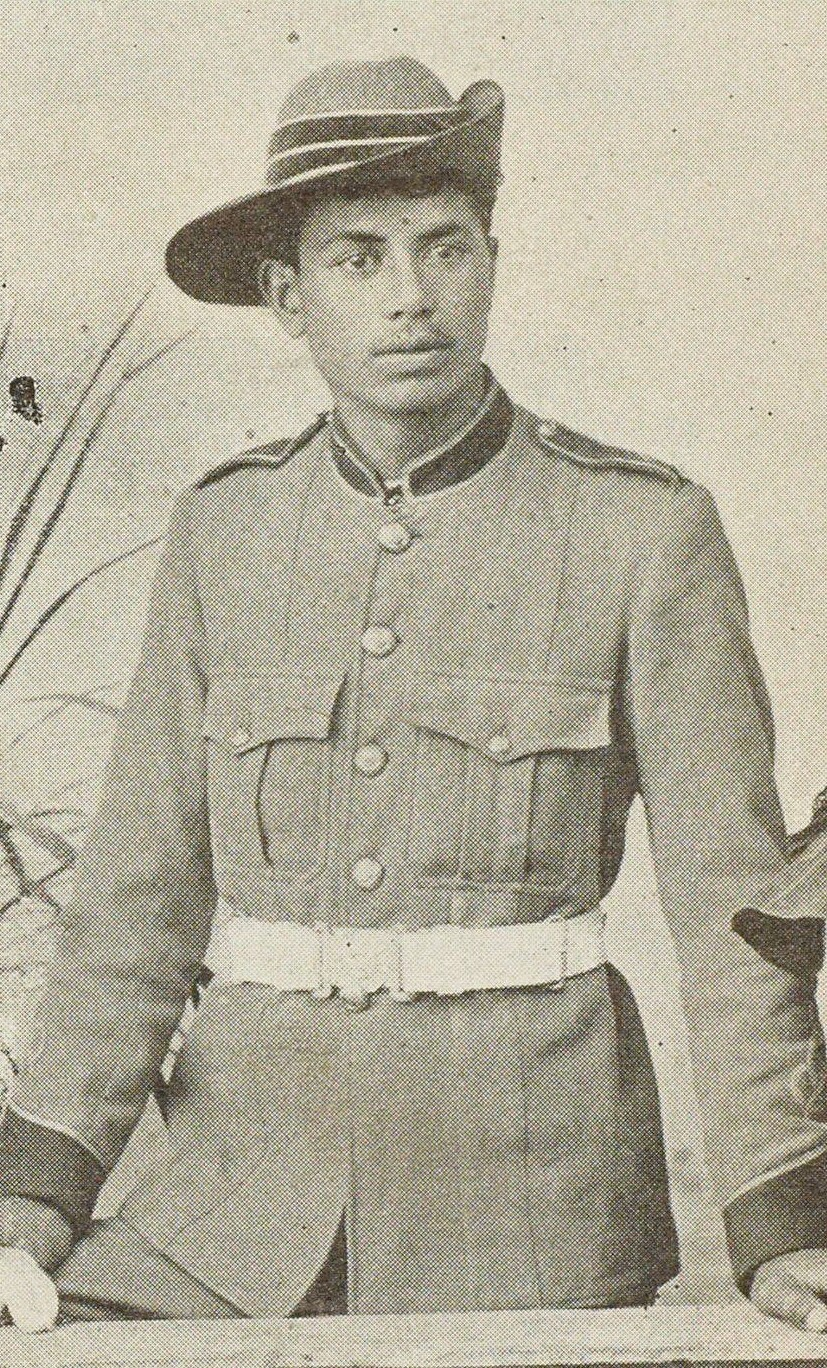
Gunner A. W. Kendall, 1901

Arthur William Kendall, also known as A. Waata Kendall, was born in 1880 in Hokianga, Northland, New Zealand. Prior to enlisting in the military, he worked as a farmer in Mitimiti, where his family lived. Kendall enlisted as a Trooper in the Fifth New Zealand Mounted Rifles. He embarked for South Africa on the Maori from Wellington on 31 March 1900, as part of the Fifth Contingent, 11 Company. His military service saw him posted to Beira, Portuguese East Africa, and he later served with the New Zealand Rhodesia Field Force Artillery.

On 10 July 1901, at the age of 21, Kendall died aboard the S.S. Tagus while at sea, succumbing to enteric fever. For his service in Africa, Kendall was awarded the Queen's South Africa Medal, with clasps for Cape Colony, Rhodesia, Transvaal, and South Africa 1901.

=== Driver Thomas Withers ===
Thomas Withers was a miner native to the town of Whangamata in the Thames-Coromandel District. Withers enlisted as a Private with the Fifth Contingent and sailed to Africa aboard the SS Maori on 31 March 1900. While stationed in Johannesburg, Withers contracted enteric fever and passed on the 5th of January 1901. Withers was buried in Johannesburg cemetery. Withers was posthumously awarded the Queen's South Africa Medal, with clasps for Cape Colony, Rhodesia, Transvaal, and South Africa 1901.

== Bibliography ==
- Phillips, Jock (2016). To the Memory: New Zealand's War Memorials. Nelson, New Zealand: Potton & Burton. ISBN 978-0-947503-02-4.
- Stowers, Richard (2009). Rough Riders at War. Hamilton, New Zealand: Richard Stowers. ISBN 978-0-473-09248-1.
- Hall, David Oswald William (1949). The New Zealanders in South Africa 1899-1902 (PDF) (1st ed.). Wellington, New Zealand: War History Branch, Department of Internal Affairs.
