= Albert Park tunnels =

Tunnels in Auckland, New Zealand

Coordinates: 36.8514°S 174.767°E

The Albert Park tunnels are found largely beneath Albert Park, in central Auckland, New Zealand. The tunnels were constructed as air raid shelters during the Second World War. At the conclusion of the war they were sealed to prevent vandalism or misuse by the public, and as a protection against carbon dioxide build-up or tunnel collapse.

== Conception ==
New Zealand's involvement in the war began in 1939, and with Axis naval activity occurring in New Zealand waters, domestic defence plans were necessary, with much capital being invested. Matters became urgent with the entry of Japan into the war in 1941.

A number of coastal defences were already in place throughout the country, with a concentration in Auckland, and Auckland City Council felt the need for air raid shelters in the central city, in preparation for Japanese attack. Work began in December 1941, and by January 1942, 16,300 feet of slit trenches had been dug around the city. Additional shelters were created in basements, the Domain, Grafton Gully, and the old Parnell railway tunnel.

Auckland city centre had a daytime population of 70,000, but by April 1942 shelter capacity was only 20,000. Furthermore, experience in Britain during the Blitz indicated that deep shelters provided greater protection. Due to its topography and central location, Albert Park – a communal facility built in the 1880s on the site of an 1840s army barracks – was chosen as the site for a major construction. In 1942 a large complex of tunnels and shelters was established under the park, capable of sheltering 20,400 people.

The tunnels were designed by city engineer James Tyler, and were estimated to cost £120,000 (about £6 per head), with £90,000 of the cost met by the government and the rest by Auckland City. With planned shifts running twenty-four hours, the work was expected to take four to six months. Work began in February, with up to 300 men in gangs working three shifts a day six days a week, and the digging was completed in August. Carpentry and plumbing, at additional cost, was added over the following two months. The tunnels were officially opened by Mayor John Allum in October 1942.

== Construction and structure ==
Map of the Albert Park tunnels

There are more than 3.5 kilometres (2.2 mi) of tunnels, reaching from Constitution Hill to Wellesley Street, involving a network of shelters, sanitation facilities and first aid posts, all ventilated by air shafts, with a total of nine entrances. The tunnels run through sandstone and volcanic rock, and were mainly dug by hand by a team of 114 council workers, most of whom were middle-aged men who were unfit for war. The tunnels were lined with over 975 km of New Zealand native timber, including Kauri, Heart Rimu, Larch and New Zealand Stringy Bark. A total of 315 people were involved with this project.

The central, arched access tunnels were 9 ft high (2.7 m), 15 ft wide (4.6 m), and 3,700 ft long (1,100 m); the grid of accommodation galleries – totalling 6,000 ft (1,800 m) – were 7 ft (2.1 m) square and provided with wooden seating. The floors were covered with scoria.

The tunnel complex, unlike many other air raid shelter complexes, does not have blast doors, but instead has baffles. The baffle is a block in a tunnel constructed from wood, lead and stone to absorb the shock wave in the event of a bomb blast. The small tunnels around them allowed passage and reduced the shock with the perpendicular reflections.

A diesel engine from an old meatworks powered the ventilation fans and emergency lighting, as well as a loud-speaker system.

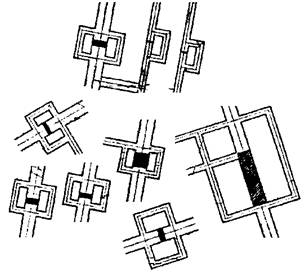
Illustrations of 'baffles'

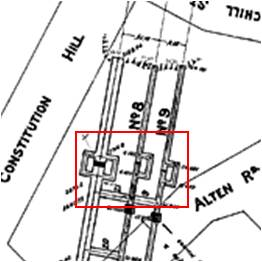
Enlargement of Alten Rd entrance to tunnel complex with three 'baffles' encompassed inside red box

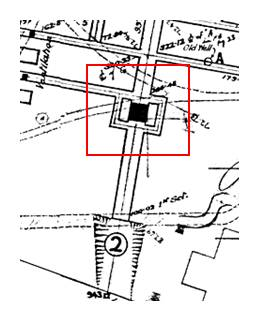
Enlargement of entrance 2 to tunnel complex with 'baffle' isolated in red box

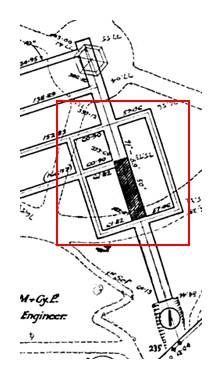
Enlargement of entrance 1 to tunnel complex with 'baffle' isolated in red box

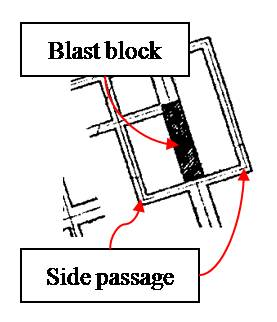
Annotated 'Baffle'

== Postwar history ==
The expected air raids did not happen, and with the tunnels unused, by the end of 1943 the timber supports were beginning to fail. By February 1945, without the money to upgrade or convert the tunnels to other use, plans were made to fill them in. The tunnels were filled in with 8.8 million unfired clay blocks made by Crum Brick and Tile in New Lynn. It took 15 men a total of 12 months to complete the back-filling process and the entrances were sealed and buried by 18 April 1946.

Since then, a number of schemes have been proposed to make use of reopened tunnels. In the 1960s there were newspaper articles proposing ideas, and interest was renewed in the 1990s by two groups: a businessman seeking to open them as a tourism venture, and a group of architecture students with their lecturer who considered the tunnels might offer a solution to Auckland's traffic problems.

In 1996, the city council signed a contract with tourism promotor William Reid, giving him permission to unseal the tunnels and perform an inspection, with a view to developing a tourist attraction. Related legislation was passed in 2001.

In 2005, subsidence occurred within the park, due to the collapse of in-fill soil within the old ventilation shafts. Blocked entrances can be seen at the top of Victoria Street – hidden by a decorative wall – and the steel door present at the foot of Constitution Hill. Three other blocked entrances are located behind the Park's Gateway sculpture.

As of June 2012, two Auckland residents Bill Reid and Mark Howarth, were working on plans to have the first 25m of tunnel five excavated in order to create a museum depicting its history. However, Auckland Council advised that no investigations had been carried out with regards to work required to reopen the tunnels.

In January 2017, Reid was engaged in meetings with Auckland Tourism, Events and Economic Development (ATEED) and campaigning for the tunnels to be reopened as a tourist attraction and as a direct link for walkers and cyclists between Victoria Street and Parnell.
