= Louis Catherin Servant =

French priest and missionary to New Zealand (1808–1860)

Louis Catherin Servant (25 October 1808 – 8 January 1860) was a French priest and missionary to New Zealand.

== Life ==
Servant was born in Grezieu-le-Marché, France on 25 October 1808 to Jean-Antoine and Antoinette Blanchard Servant. He had two sisters, Jeanette and Françoise. In 1829 he entered the seminary of St Irenaeus at Lyons and joined the Society of Mary (Marists) in 1836. He volunteered for the mission to Oceania, and in October was in Paris purchasing supplies for the expedition. While there, he did not wear clerical garb, but dressed as a layman. He put his affairs in order and wrote his parents to console them about his departure.

== Voyage ==
Servant sailed from Le Havre aboard the Delphine on 24 December 1836 along with Bishop J. B. F. Pompallier, three other Marist priests and Brother Michel Colombon, and two members of the Little Brothers of Mary. Father Claude Bret caught a flu-like virus in the Canary Islands and died at sea in March 1837. Contrary winds hampered their voyage to Valparaíso, and Servant himself was ill more than once during the crossing. They arrived at Valparaíso on 28 June and remained there until 10 August 1837, when they embarked on the Europa for Tahiti, which they reached on 21 September.

They left Tahiti on 23 October on the schooner Raiatea. Having nearly been shipwrecked in a storm off Vavaʻu, they were not permitted to land, due to the influence of Methodists, so they proceeded to drop off Father Pierre Bataillon and Brother Joseph-Xavier at Wallis, the main seat of the mission in Tonga. After stocking up on wood and water, the ship continued to Futuna, arriving on 8 November 1837. There Pierre Chanel and lay brother Marie-Nizier Delorme left the group. From there they traveled to Rotuma and then made for Sydney, where the bishop was able to consult with John Bede Polding, Apostolic Vicar of New Holland and Van Diemen's Land.

On 30 December Pompallier, Fr Servant and Brother Michel Colombon sailed for the Hokianga and arrived on 10 January 1838.

== New Zealand ==
The missionaries were based first at Papakauwau on the south side of the Hokianga, near which ships would come and anchor from time to time. There Servant ministered to the Maori, and about fifty English and Irish Catholics who otherwise traveled to Sydney to perform their Easter duty or have children baptized. Servant had made some attempt to learn English on the voyage out, and now undertook the study of Maori as well. He used his three-cornered hat to help explain the Holy Trinity. The Maori leader Papahurihia and his followers were sympathetic to the French Catholics and saw them as natural allies against the Protestant community well established at Hokianga. Father Claude-André Baty arrived in June 1839 and was put in charge of the mission at Papakauwau.

In March 1840 Servant was at the Bay of Islands as Bishop Pompallier had asked for his assistance in writing instructions in the native language. About this time Servant also wrote the motherhouse in Lyon expressing his concern regarding the bishop administration of the mission. He felt that Pompallier was too easily persuaded to overpay for unnecessary expenses, much of which was funded by the Lyon-based Society for the Propagation of the Faith. He also mentioned the bishop's method of dealing with members of the mission, and attempts to restrict what information was communicated to the motherhouse.
