= Stuart Newall =

New Zealand soldier and military leader

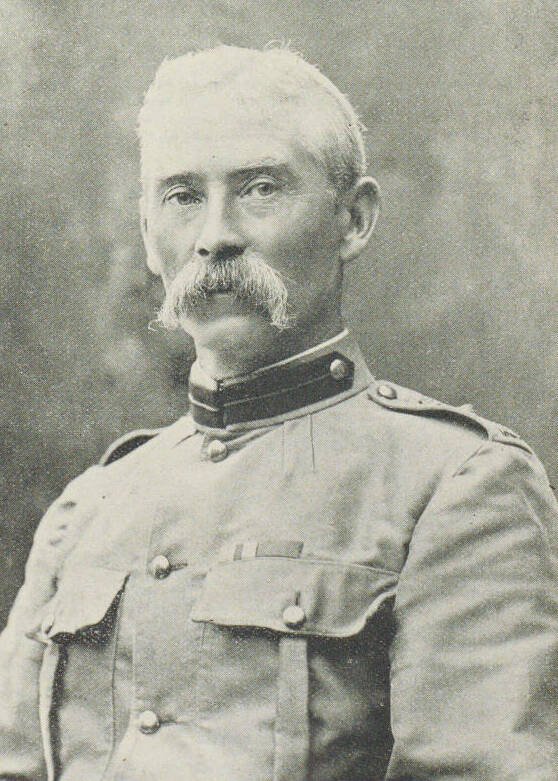
- Born: 9 May 1843; Durrisdeer, Scotland
- Died: 3 August 1919 (aged 76); Waihi, New Zealand
- Burial place: Karori Cemetery, Wellington, New Zealand
- Military career
- Allegiance: British Empire
- Branch: Armed Constabulary; New Zealand Military Forces
- Service years: 1863–1903
- Rank: Colonel
- Commands: 5th Contingent
- Campaigns: New Zealand Wars; Tītokowaru's War; Te Kooti's War; Dog Tax War; Second Boer War
- Awards: Companion of the Order of the Bath; Mentioned in Despatches

Stuart Newall CB (9 May 1843 – 3 August 1919) was a New Zealand soldier and military leader. He served in the New Zealand Wars and also commanded the 5th Contingent that was sent to South Africa in 1900 to serve in the Second Boer War.

Born in Scotland, Newall moved to New Zealand in 1863 to go gold mining. He subsequently joined the militia and served in the Invasion of the Waikato of 1863. A few years later he joined New Zealand's Armed Constabulary and was involved in the New Zealand government's campaigns against prominent Māori warriors Tītokowaru and Te Kooti. He commanded Armed Constabulary posts in the Waikato region for a number of years and was present at the 1881 occupation of Parihaka. In 1883, he joined the Permanent Militia, becoming a professional soldier and holding training and administrative posts. In 1900, he was appointed commander of the 5th Contingent and served for several months in South Africa. He retired from the military as a colonel three years later. During the First World War, he was commandant at the King George V military hospital in Rotorua. He died in 1919 at the age of 76.

== Early life ==
Born in Durrisdeer in Scotland on 9 May 1843, Stuart Newall's given name at his baptism was Stewart. His father was a tailor. Newall moved to Australia in early 1863 but after a few months living in Victoria, moved to the South Island of New Zealand. He mined for gold in the Otago region but was unsuccessful and by the end of the year had enlisted in the Waikato Militia. During the Invasion of the Waikato, he was an escort for supply convoys and was also on garrison duty in South Auckland.

== Armed Constabulary ==
In 1868, the Armed Constabulary was formed as New Zealand's paramilitary force, having both a military and policing function. Newall became a sergeant in the new organisation, which was commanded by Colonel George Whitmore. The following year, Newall served in Whitmore's campaign against the Māori warrior Tītokowaru in the south Taranaki. When that came to a conclusion, he then fought in Te Kooti's War in the Bay of Plenty and was involved some of the engagements of the invasion of the Ureweras. During the campaign he was commissioned as an acting sub-inspector.

From 1870, Newall commanded Armed Constabulary posts in the Waikato, including that at Cambridge where he was also the postmaster. During his time in Cambridge, he married Georgina Roberts, the daughter of one of his superior officers in the Armed Constabulary. In March 1875, he commanded the post at the Ohinemuri goldfield, near the Coromandel Peninsula, policing the mining population there. After a year he returned to the Waikato and over the next few years supervised the road and bridge building in the south of the region.

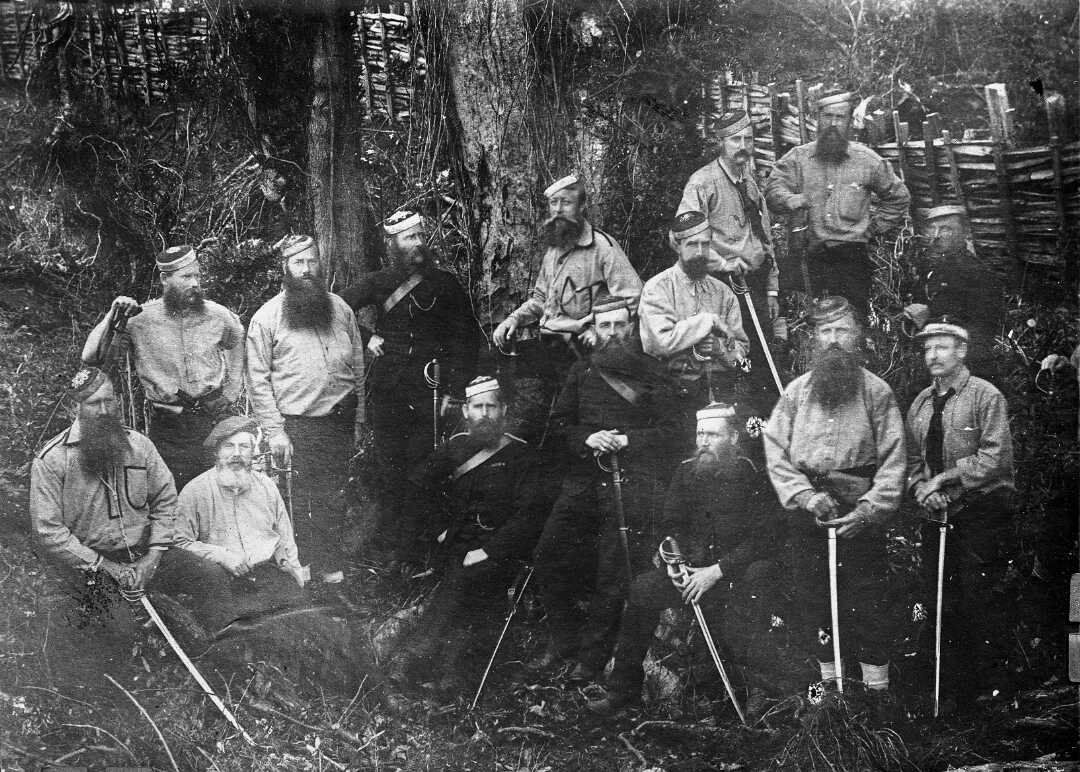
Newell stands in the back row, to the right of the tree, in this group of officers of the Armed Constabulary at Parihaka, November 1881

In early November 1881 a force of over 600 Armed Constabulary, supplemented by 1,000 armed settlers, was called out to the village of Parihaka, in the Taranaki, to deal with peaceful protests against Europeans settling on land confiscated from the local iwi (tribe). The Armed Constabulary entered the village, its population boosted by the presence of protesters, on 5 November and Newall was one of the officers to arrest the ringleaders. For the remainder of the month, the village was occupied while the Armed Constabulary evicted the non-residents.

== Permanent Militia ==
In 1883, Newall transferred to the Permanent Militia with the rank of captain. This was the full-time portion of the New Zealand Military Forces, and amounted to around 350 men. Newall's duties included the training of units of the Volunteer Force., the part-time component of the New Zealand Military Forces. Becoming well regarded for his administration skills he was appointed commander of the Military Districts in Wellington, Taranaki and the Wairarapa in 1891. By this time he held the rank of lieutenant colonel. In April 1898, there was civil unrest amongst Māori in Northland over a tax applied to the ownership of dogs. Colonists were concerned enough to fear for their safety and a party of 120 men, under the commander of Newall, were sent to Waimea, on the Hokianga, in early May. Eventually, what became known as the Dog Tax War was settled with the arrest of the ringleaders and Newall's men were not called upon to take action.

=== Second Boer War ===
In March 1900 Newall led the 5th Contingent to South Africa, where for the next nine months it campaigned as part of New Zealand's contribution to the Second Boer War. His command was organised as four squadrons of mounted infantry and, forming part of the Rhodesian Field Force, was involved in several skirmishes with Boer commandos, including one on 5 September, in which a patrol of troopers led by Newall captured several prisoners of war. He spent the later stages of the year at Klerksdorp as part of the garrison there.

At the end of the year, Newall returned to New Zealand and took up command of the Wellington Military District. Mentioned in despatches during the campaign in South Africa, Newall was subsequently appointed a Companion of the Order of the Bath in recognition of his services there. He retired from the Permanent Militia in 1903, most likely because of his advanced years. He held the rank of colonel at the time.

== Later life ==
Still in good health, Newall was called upon in October 1913 to lead a group of special constables to help maintain order in Wellington during the Great Strike that arose at that time. Many of the constables under his command were, like Newall, veterans of the Second Boer War and called upon to suppress protesters. From December 1915 to June 1918 Newall was commandant of the King George V Military Hospital in Rotorua. He retired to Waihi to live with one of his daughters. He died there of heart failure on 3 August 1919. He was survived by his five children; his wife had predeceased him and he was buried alongside her at Karori Cemetery in Wellington.
