= Omanaia =

- Location within Northland Region
- Coordinates: 35°27′16″S 173°31′37″E
- Country: New Zealand
- Region: Northland Region
- District: Far North District

Omanaia (Māori: Ōmanaia) is a settlement in the Hokianga area of Northland, New Zealand. It is part of the Hokianga South statistical area, which covers the southern side of Hokianga Harbour between Rawene and Koutu. For demographics of this area, see Rawene.

The New Zealand Ministry for Culture and Heritage gives a translation of "place of Manaia" for Ōmanaia.

In the 1830s, the Omanaia Maori chief Papahurihia led a nationalist movement to oppose the spread of Christianity through the Hokianga.

== Marae ==
Te Pīti or Ōmanaia Marae, and Te Piiti meeting house, are a meeting place for the Ngāpuhi hapū of Ngāti Hau and Ngāti Kaharau.

In October 2020, the Government committed $493,685 from the Provincial Growth Fund for an overflow renovation of the marae, to create multipurpose space, creating 5 jobs.

== Education ==
Omanaia School is a coeducational full primary (years 1–8) school with a roll of 67 students as of July 2026.
