= Hōne Riiwi Tōia =

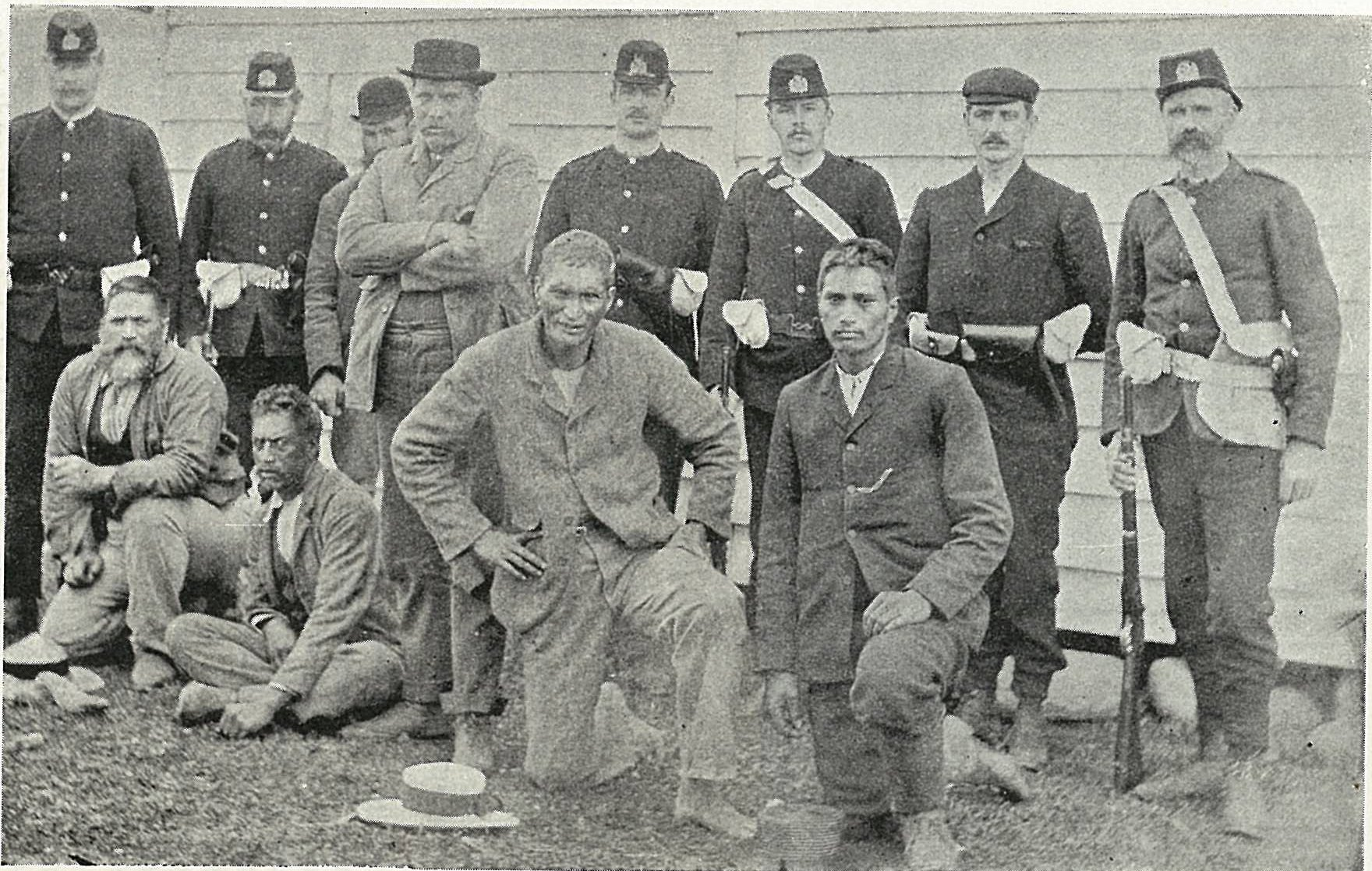
Tōia (standing, civilian dress) and four other Māori after their arrest, May 1898

Hōne Riiwi Tōia (1858 – 9 August 1933) was a notable Māori tribal leader, prophet, religious leader and protester of New Zealand. He identified with the Ngāpuhi iwi.

He was born in Waimate North, Northland, between 1858 and 1860. His paternal grandfather was a Jewish trader named Levy (Riiwi) who visited the Hokianga. Tōia's father was Hīmi Riiwi Tōia and his mother was Maraea, from the Te Māhurehure hapū of Waimā. Tōia was raised as an Anglican, but became influential among Te Māhurehure, who were mostly Wesleyans because of the Wesleyan mission station at Waimā. He became the leader of a religious group who broke away from the Wesleyans.

Tōia led the tax revolt sometimes called the Dog Tax War and was arrested in 1898 and imprisoned for 18 months.
