= Wellesley Street, Auckland =

Street in Auckland city centre, New Zealand

Wellesley Street
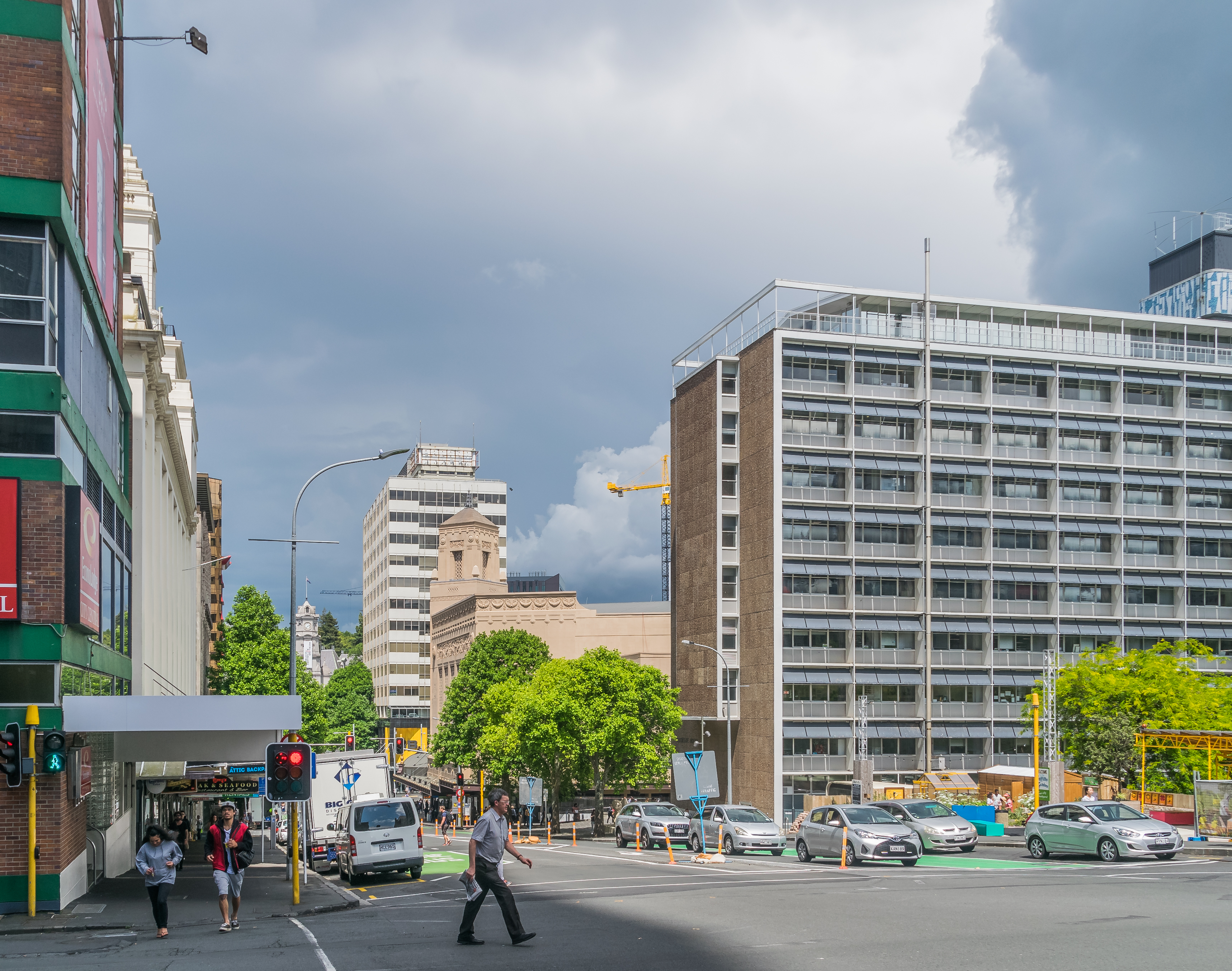
- Wellesley Street in 2017
- Length: 1.5 km (0.93 mi)
- Location: Auckland City Centre, New Zealand
- Postal code: 1010
- Nearest metro station: Wellesley Street Station
- Coordinates: 36.85081°S 174.76420°E
- West end: Halsey Street
- Major junctions: Queen Street
- East end: Grafton Road

Wellesley Street is a street in the Auckland City Centre, New Zealand, located between the south-east corner of Victoria Park and Grafton Road. The street is split into two sections at the junction of Queen Street, Wellesley Street West and Wellesley Street East.

== History ==
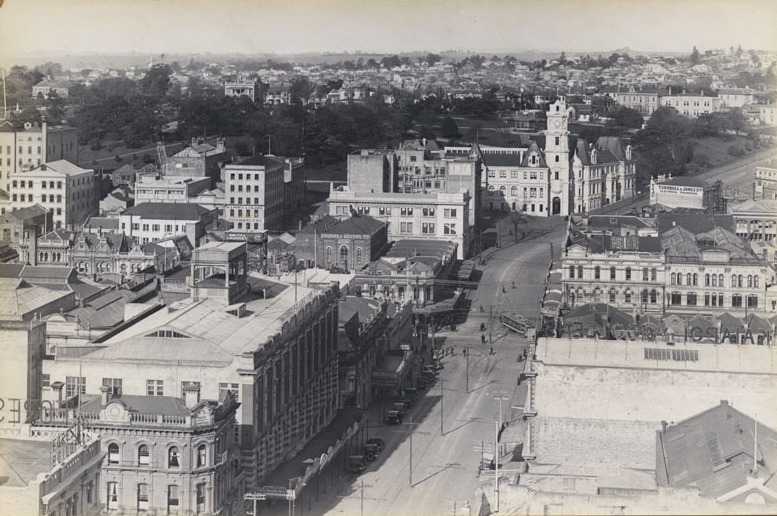
Wellesley Street in 1921

The street was named after Arthur Wellesley, 1st Duke of Wellington.

During the late 1880s, Wellesley Street became the cultural centre for Auckland, after the opening of the Auckland Art Gallery and the Auckland central library. The intersection with Elliott Street was the location of the Fullers Opera House, and the area thrived, with Vaudeville theatres and hotels becoming established around Wellesley Street.

The Wellesley and Queen Street intersection became a transportation hub in the late 19th century, with the first horse-drawn trams linking Wellesley Street to Ponsonby starting operation in August 1884. By the early 20th century, the intersection was a major stop for the Auckland tramway network.

The St James apartments were constructed in 1910 for the YMCA. By 1955, the building had become too small for the YMCA, who relocated, with the building later becoming apartments.

A Rotary automatic telephone exchange system was installed in Auckland in 1924, with the central city telephone exchange (WLT) located on Wellesley Street.

The new Auckland central library opened on Wellesley Street in 1971. The Auckland Art Gallery also expanded in 1971 and 1981.

== Notable locations ==
- The Auckland central library
- Civic Theatre at the junction with Queen Street, which was constructed in 1929.
- Smith & Caughey's, a department store established in 1880
- St Matthew's, a historic neo-Gothic Anglican church.
