= Cable Bay, Northland =

Cable Bay
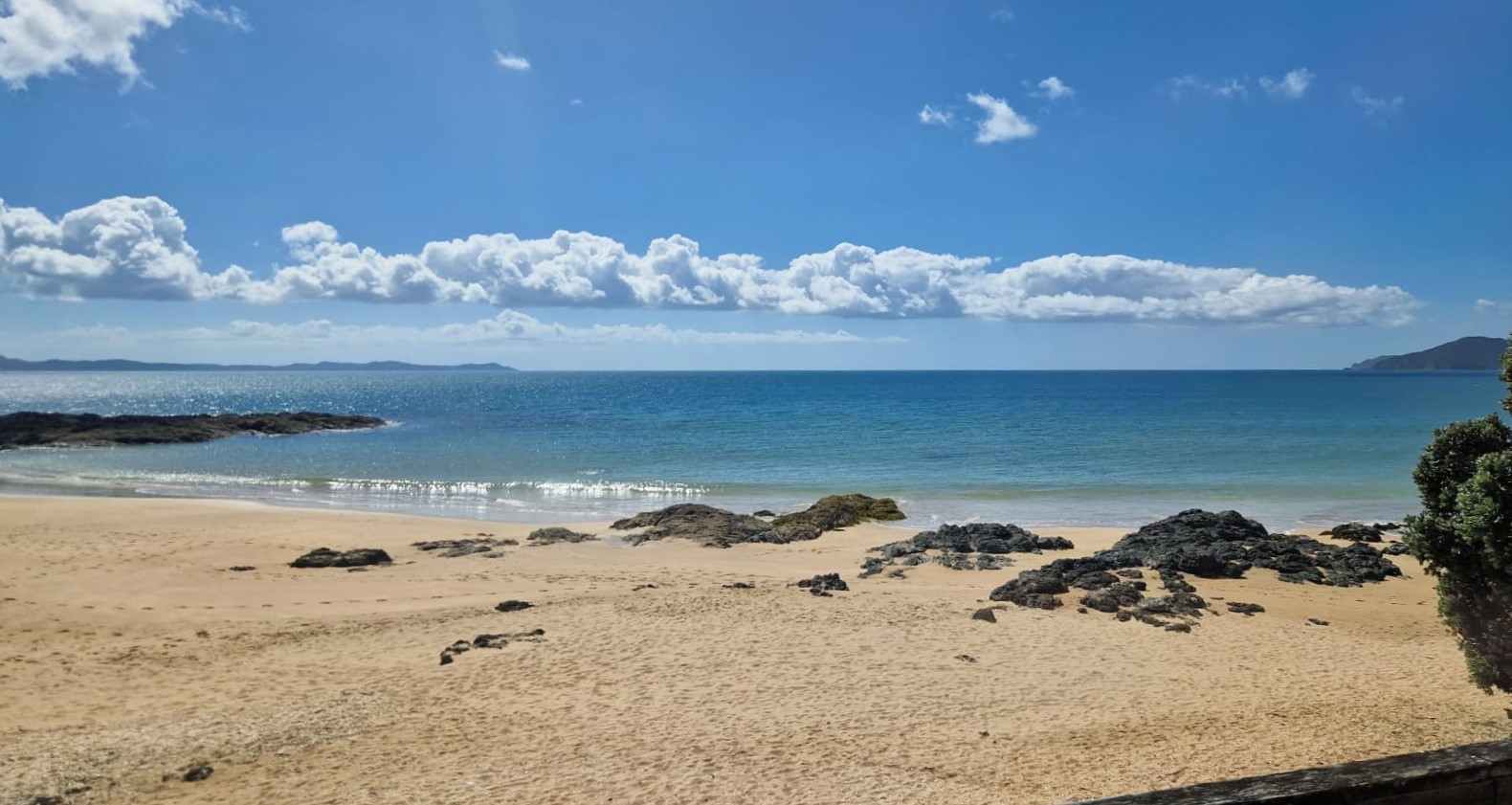
- View of Cable Bay and greater Doubtless Bay
- Interactive map of Cable Bay
- Coordinates: 34.993°S 173.483°E
- Country: New Zealand
- Region: Northland Region
- District: Far North District
- Ward: Te Hiku
- Community: Te Hiku
- Subdivision: Doubtless Bay
- Electorates: Northland; Te Tai Tokerau

Government
  - Territorial Authority: Far North District Council
  - Regional council: Northland Regional Council
  - Mayor of Far North: Moko Tepania
  - Northland MP: Grant McCallum
  - Te Tai Tokerau MP: TBD

Area
  - Total: 3.63 km^{2} (1.40 sq mi)

Population (June 2025)
  - Total: 1,190
  - Density: 328/km^{2} (849/sq mi)

Cable Bay is a settlement on the southern side of Doubtless Bay in Northland, New Zealand. State Highway 10 runs through it. It is one of the Taipā–Mangōnui string of settlements, separated from Taipā on the west by the Taipā River and from Coopers Beach on the east by Otanenui Stream.

The name comes from the Pacific Cable Station which was a terminus of a telegraph cable running between New Zealand and British Columbia as part of the All Red Line. The station was established in 1902 and operated until the terminus was moved to Auckland in 1912.

== Demographics ==
Statistics New Zealand describes Cable Bay as a rural settlement. It covers 3.63 km^{2} (1.40 sq mi) and had an estimated population of 1,190 as of June 2025, with a population density of 328 people per km^{2}. Cable Bay is part of the larger Doubtless Bay statistical area.

Historical population
Year	Pop.	±% p.a.
2006	612	—
2013	696	+1.85%
2018	891	+5.06%
2023	1,158	+5.38%

Cable Bay had a population of 1,158 in the 2023 New Zealand census, an increase of 267 people (30.0%) since the 2018 census, and an increase of 462 people (66.4%) since the 2013 census. There were 546 males and 612 females in 492 dwellings. 2.8% of people identified as LGBTIQ+. The median age was 54.3 years (compared with 38.1 years nationally). There were 183 people (15.8%) aged under 15 years, 111 (9.6%) aged 15 to 29, 501 (43.3%) aged 30 to 64, and 363 (31.3%) aged 65 or older.

People could identify as more than one ethnicity. The results were 81.1% European (Pākehā); 32.4% Māori; 4.9% Pasifika; 3.1% Asian; 0.8% Middle Eastern, Latin American and African New Zealanders (MELAA); and 3.1% other, which includes people giving their ethnicity as "New Zealander". English was spoken by 97.9%, Māori language by 8.5%, Samoan by 0.8% and other languages by 7.3%. No language could be spoken by 1.6% (e.g. too young to talk). New Zealand Sign Language was known by 0.5%. The percentage of people born overseas was 20.2, compared with 28.8% nationally.

Religious affiliations were 32.9% Christian, 0.3% Hindu, 1.8% Māori religious beliefs, 0.5% Buddhist, 0.5% New Age, 0.3% Jewish, and 1.3% other religions. People who answered that they had no religion were 54.1%, and 8.8% of people did not answer the census question.

Of those at least 15 years old, 138 (14.2%) people had a bachelor's or higher degree, 507 (52.0%) had a post-high school certificate or diploma, and 279 (28.6%) people exclusively held high school qualifications. The median income was $30,700, compared with $41,500 nationally. 72 people (7.4%) earned over $100,000 compared to 12.1% nationally. The employment status of those at least 15 was that 357 (36.6%) people were employed full-time, 138 (14.2%) were part-time, and 30 (3.1%) were unemployed.
