= Taipā–Mangōnui =

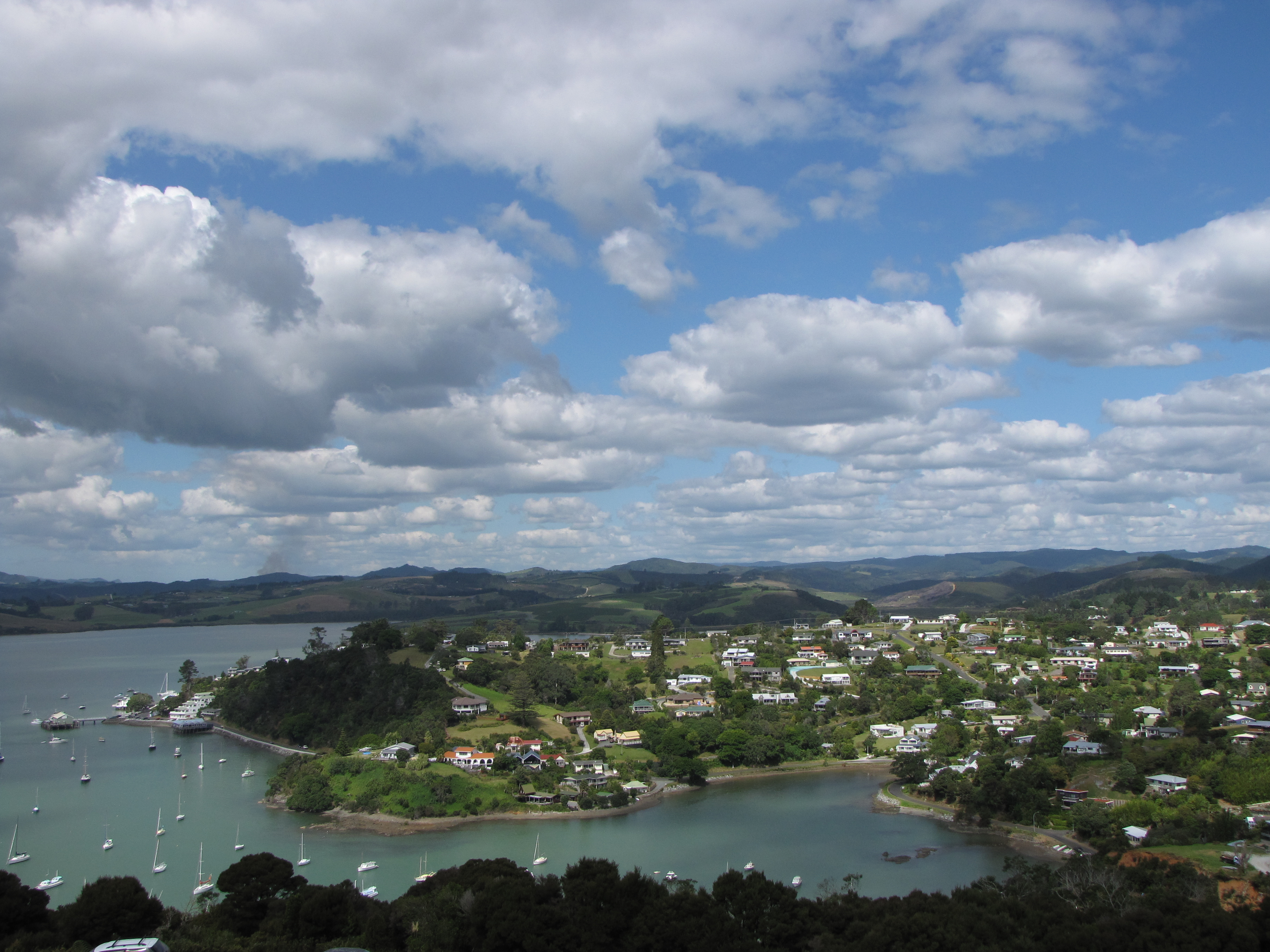
- Mill Bay (centre) and houses of Mangōnui
- Interactive map of Taipā–Mangōnui
- Coordinates: 34°59′44″S 173°27′53″E
- Country: New Zealand
- Region: Northland Region
- District: Far North District
- Ward: Te Hiku
- Community: Te Hiku
- Subdivision: Doubtless Bay
- Electorates: Northland; Te Tai Tokerau

Government
  - Territorial Authority: Far North District Council
  - Regional council: Northland Regional Council
  - Mayor of Far North: Moko Tepania
  - Northland MP: Grant McCallum
  - Te Tai Tokerau MP: TBD

Area
  - Total: 10.28 km^{2} (3.97 sq mi)

Population (June 2025)
  - Total: 2,690
  - Density: 262/km^{2} (678/sq mi)
- Postcode(s): 0420

Taipā–Mangōnui or Taipā Bay–Mangōnui is a string of small resort settlements – Taipā, Cable Bay, Coopers Beach and Mangōnui – that lie along the coast of Doubtless Bay in the Far North District of New Zealand. As they have grown they have run together to form a small conurbation.

Taipā–Mangōnui lies 150 kilometres by road northwest of Whangārei (100 kilometres in a straight line), 20 kilometres northeast of Kaitaia, and nearly 100 kilometres southeast of the northernmost tip of the North Island. It is the fourth largest urban area in the Far North, after the main towns of Kerikeri, Kaitaia and Kaikohe. It is the northernmost centre in New Zealand with a population of more than 1,000.

== Demographics ==
Taipā–Mangōnui, called Taumarumaru for the 2018 census and Doubtless Bay for the 2023 census, covers 10.28 km^{2} (3.97 sq mi) and had an estimated population of 2,690 as of June 2025, with a population density of 262 people per km^{2}.

Historical population
Year	Pop.	±% p.a.
2006	1,680	—
2013	1,812	+1.09%
2018	2,193	+3.89%
2023	2,631	+3.71%

Taipā–Mangōnui had a population of 2,631 in the 2023 New Zealand census, an increase of 438 people (20.0%) since the 2018 census, and an increase of 819 people (45.2%) since the 2013 census. There were 1,251 males, 1,371 females and 6 people of other genders in 1,149 dwellings. 2.6% of people identified as LGBTIQ+. The median age was 55.4 years (compared with 38.1 years nationally). There were 408 people (15.5%) aged under 15 years, 273 (10.4%) aged 15 to 29, 1,065 (40.5%) aged 30 to 64, and 885 (33.6%) aged 65 or older.

People could identify as more than one ethnicity. The results were 78.3% European (Pākehā); 35.0% Māori; 4.8% Pasifika; 3.3% Asian; 0.7% Middle Eastern, Latin American and African New Zealanders (MELAA); and 2.6% other, which includes people giving their ethnicity as "New Zealander". English was spoken by 97.6%, Māori language by 9.4%, Samoan by 0.7% and other languages by 6.4%. No language could be spoken by 1.5% (e.g. too young to talk). New Zealand Sign Language was known by 0.7%. The percentage of people born overseas was 18.7, compared with 28.8% nationally.

Religious affiliations were 34.4% Christian, 0.5% Hindu, 0.1% Islam, 2.4% Māori religious beliefs, 0.6% Buddhist, 0.7% New Age, 0.1% Jewish, and 1.6% other religions. People who answered that they had no religion were 51.2%, and 8.7% of people did not answer the census question.

Of those at least 15 years old, 318 (14.3%) people had a bachelor's or higher degree, 1,155 (52.0%) had a post-high school certificate or diploma, and 636 (28.6%) people exclusively held high school qualifications. The median income was $28,800, compared with $41,500 nationally. 147 people (6.6%) earned over $100,000 compared to 12.1% nationally. The employment status of those at least 15 was that 729 (32.8%) people were employed full-time, 318 (14.3%) were part-time, and 60 (2.7%) were unemployed.

== History ==
=== Before European arrival ===
According to some Māori legends, the great Polynesian explorer and navigator Kupe sailed from Hawaiki in his canoe named Matahourua and landed at Taipā Bay. Others believe that he landed in the Hokianga Harbour around AD 900.

Centuries after Kupe's landing, the chiefs Te Parata and Tu moana, descendants of Kupe, were said to have brought the ancestors of the Ngāti Kahu tribe to the Mangōnui area around AD 1350, returning on the same canoe. Legend has it that they found insufficient fresh water at Otengi Bay and travelled up to the mouth of the Taipā River to land. There they settled and married into the local tribes.

Another canoe led by Moehuri is said to have been guided by a large shark into the Mangōnui Harbour to a landing spot opposite the old post office. He made the shark tapu and called the harbour Mangōnui, meaning 'big shark' in the Māori language. In the 19th century, the spelling Mongonui was more common, and the Mongonui electorate filled one seat in Parliament between 1861 and 1881. Moehuri settled in Mangōnui and married into the local people – remnants of the Ngāti Awa and branch tribes of the Ngāti Whātua. Pā were located all around the area, including one at Mill Bay, called Rangikapiti by Moehuri.

Taumarumaru pā was located on the headland between Mangōnui and Coopers Beach while at the western end of Coopers Beach was Ohumuhumu pā, surrounded at one time by a large village.

=== Since European arrival ===
In 1769 James Cook sailed past and noted that it was "doubtless a bay ...", hence the modern name of Doubtless Bay. Eight days later the first Europeans to land were Jean-François de Surville and his crew aboard Saint Jean-Baptiste. They landed at what he named Lauriston Bay to get fresh vegetables to combat scurvy. Around twenty years later, whalers and sealers from all over the western world arrived, and called the area Coopers Beach – thought to have come from the coopers on the whaleships.

The first European settler is considered to be James David Berghan from Ireland, who arrived in Mangōnui in 1831. By the later half of the 19th century, flax and timber industries were flourishing in the area. Other settlers developed farms and businesses in the area while some married into the native population. The dynamic mix of settlers coming from various parts of Europe and the Maori population provided Mangōnui with a rich heritage.

When Hōne Heke destroyed Kororāreka (Russell), the evacuation saw 40 to 50 ships in the Mangōnui Harbour. The town assumed new importance and was considered the country's second capital. The last visit by a whaling ship was in 1885.

== Education ==
There are two schools in the area, both coeducational. Taipa Area School is a composite (years 1–15) school. Mangōnui School is a contributing primary (years 1–6) school that opened in 1858.

== Gallery ==
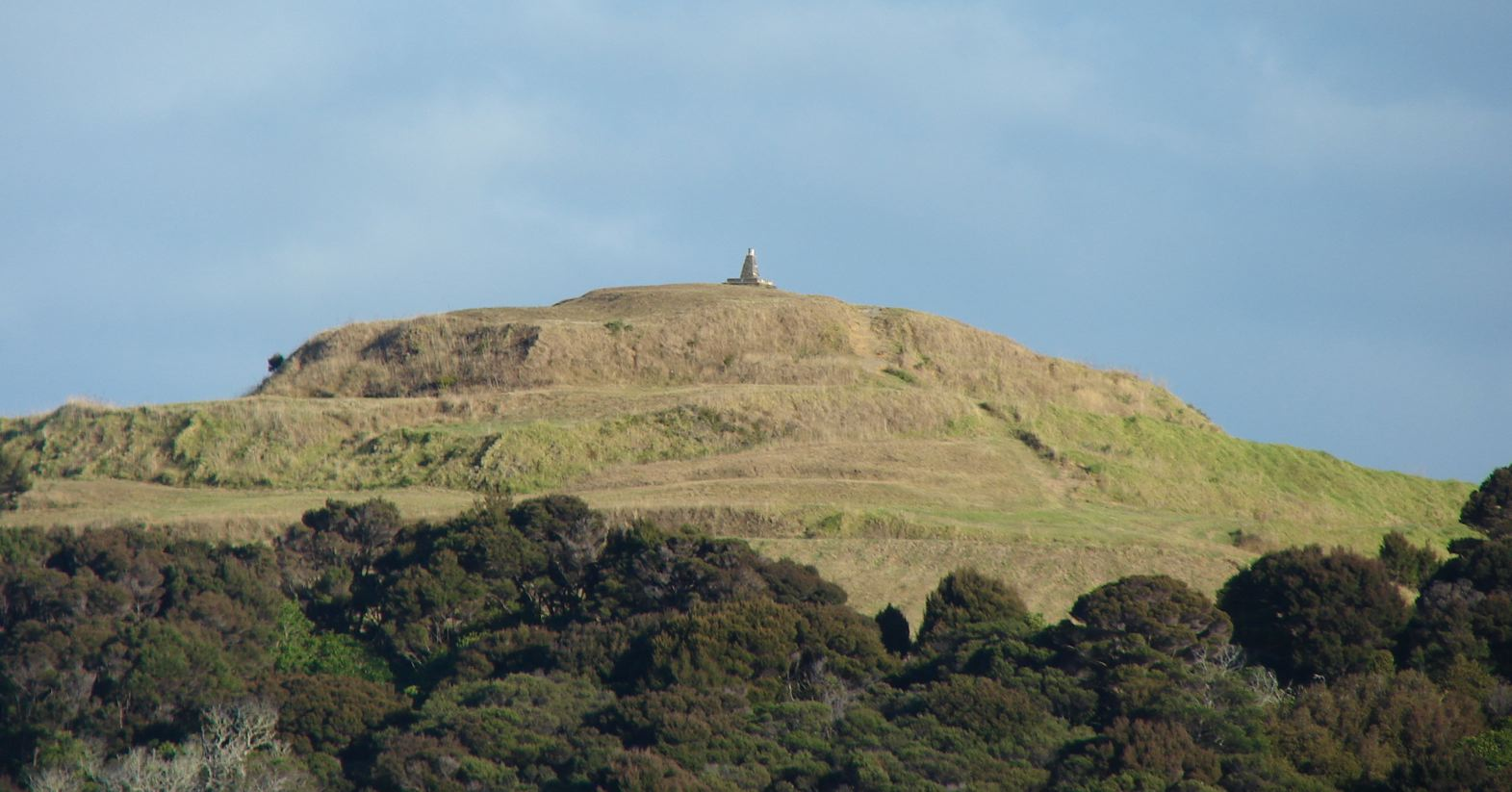
Rangikapiti Pā as seen from George Street, Mangōnui

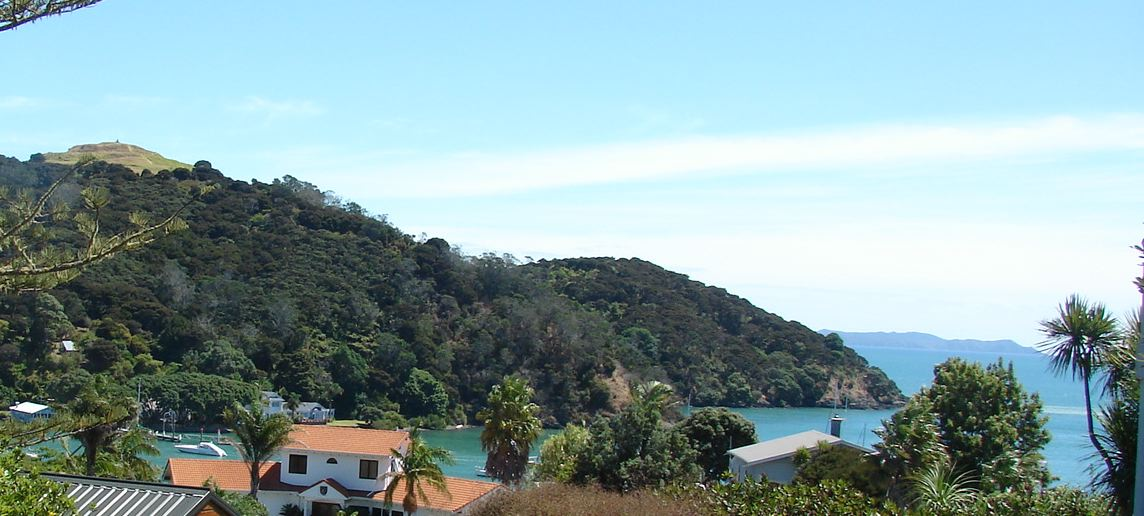
Rangikapiti Pā and the inlet to Mangōnui Harbour

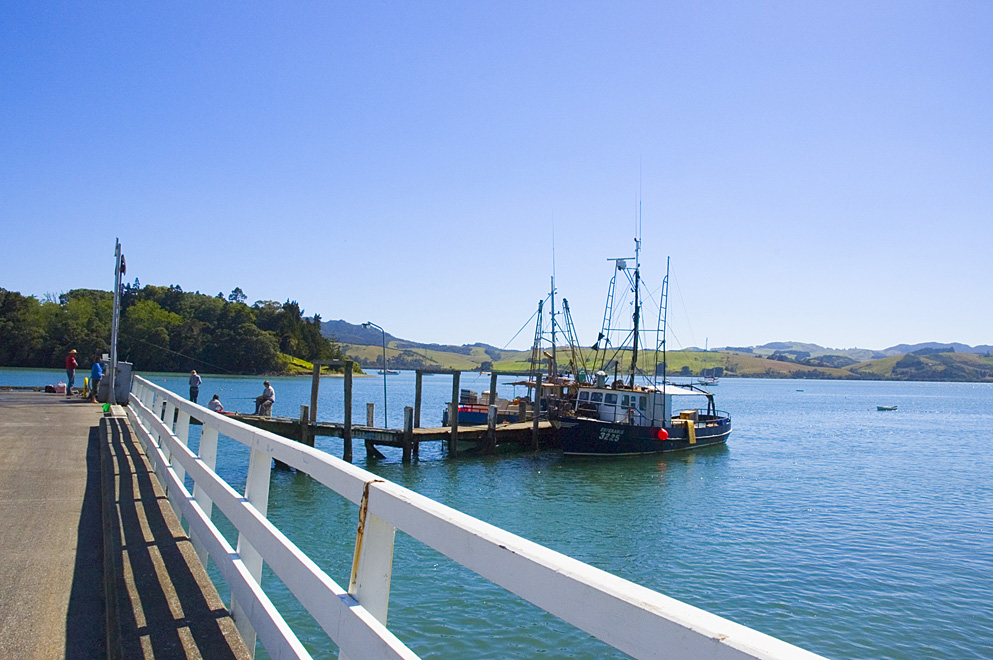
Mangōnui wharf

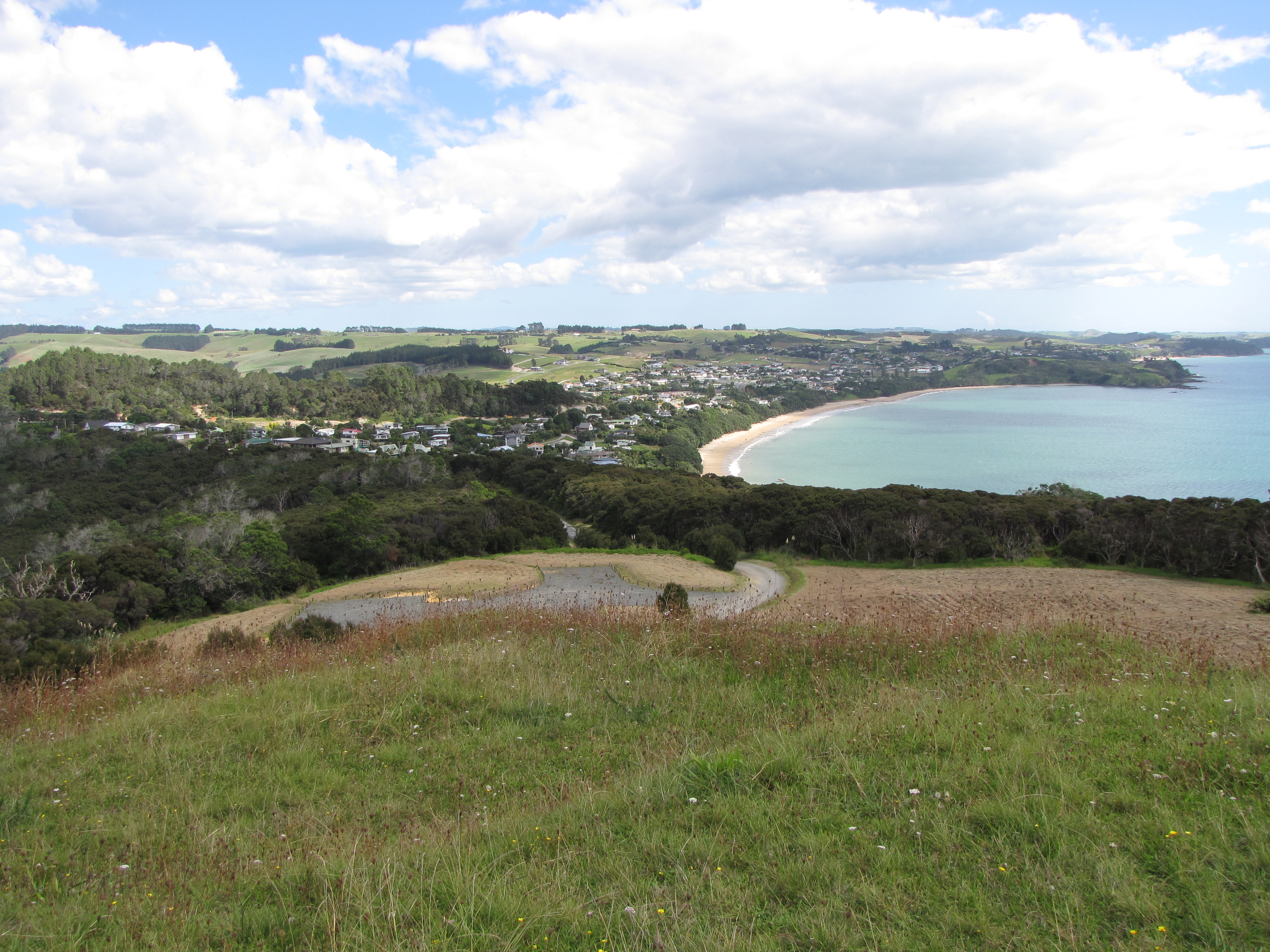
Coopers Beach from Rangikapiti

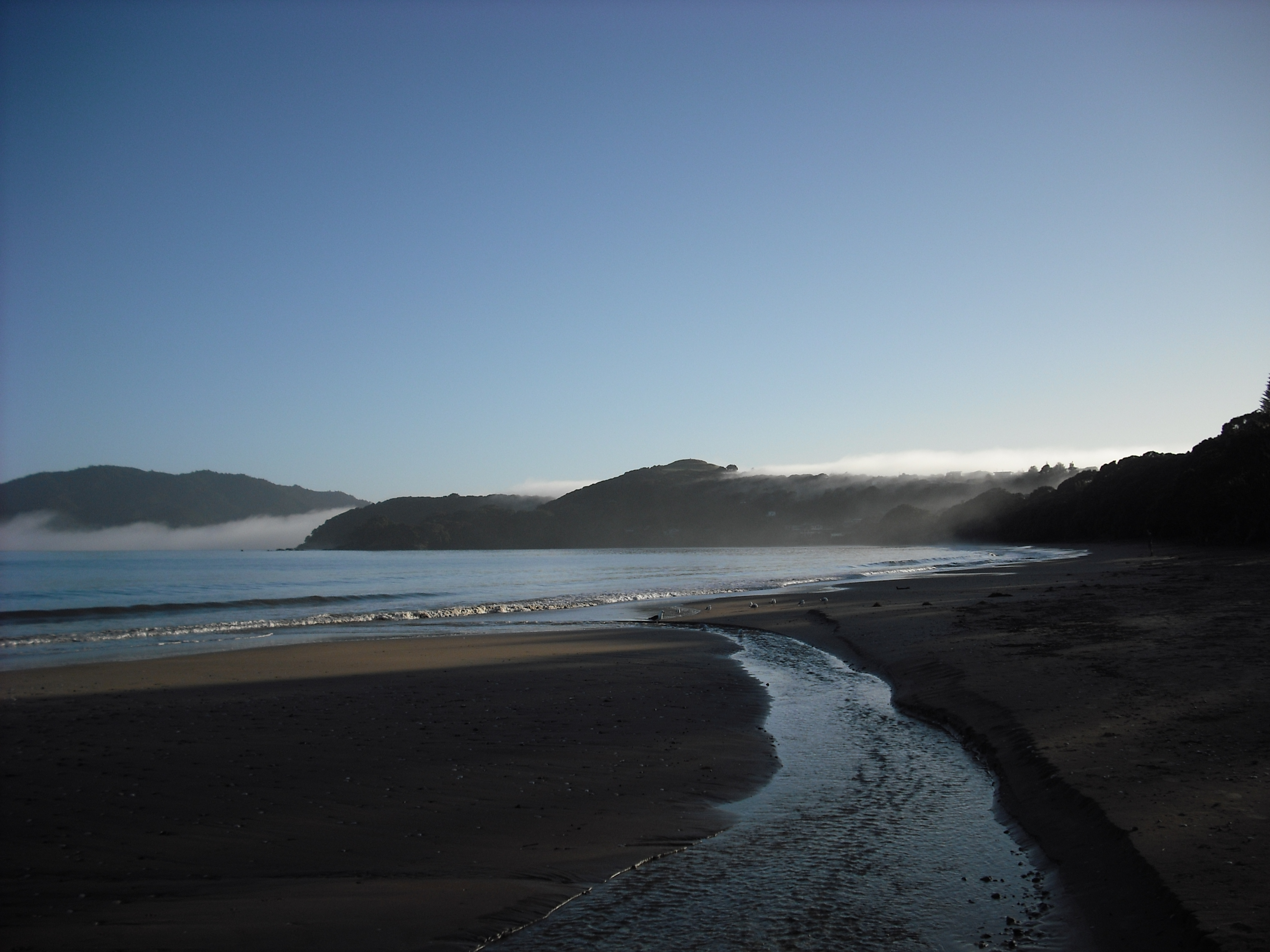
Coopers Beach
