= Mangōnui =

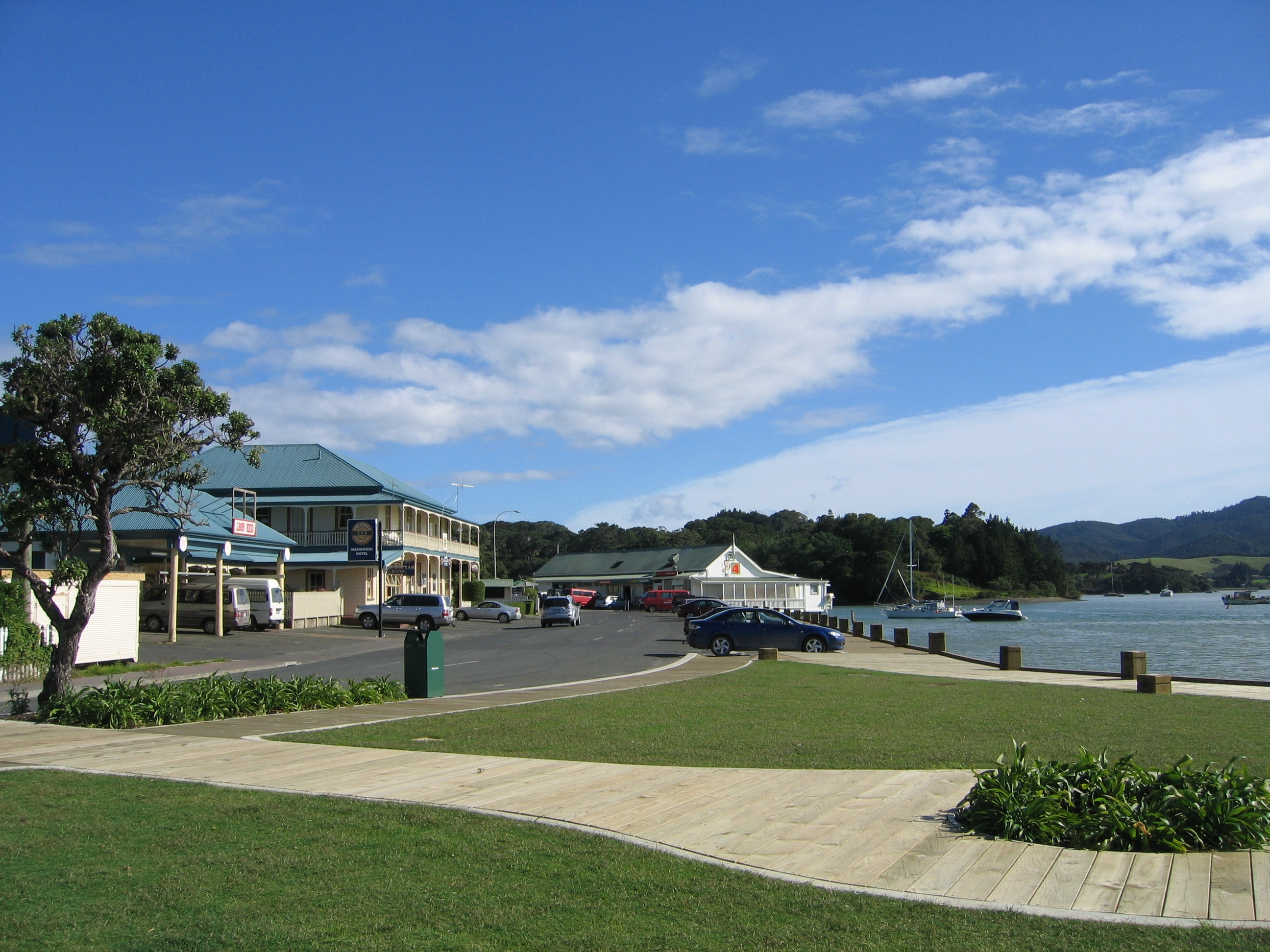
- Mangōnui waterfront in 2009
- Interactive map of Mangōnui
- Coordinates: 34.991°S 173.532°E
- Country: New Zealand
- Region: Northland Region
- District: Far North District
- Ward: Te Hiku
- Community: Te Hiku
- Subdivision: Doubtless Bay
- Electorates: Northland; Te Tai Tokerau

Government
  - Territorial Authority: Far North District Council
  - Regional council: Northland Regional Council
  - Mayor of Far North: Moko Tepania
  - Northland MP: Grant McCallum
  - Te Tai Tokerau MP: TBD

Area
  - Total: 4.39 km^{2} (1.69 sq mi)

Population (June 2025)
  - Total: 670
  - Density: 150/km^{2} (400/sq mi)

Mangōnui is a settlement on the west side of Mangōnui Harbour in Northland, New Zealand. State Highway 10 runs through it. It is the easternmost of the Taipā–Mangōnui string of settlements, separated from Coopers Beach to the northwest by Mill Bay Road.

== Etymology ==
The name Mangōnui means 'great shark' and is taken from a mythical guardian taniwha that had the form of a shark and which accompanied a migratory canoe into the harbour. The name was frequently spelt 'Mongonui' before the 1880s, although attempts were made to correct the spelling. The name became officially Mangōnui in 2020.

== History ==
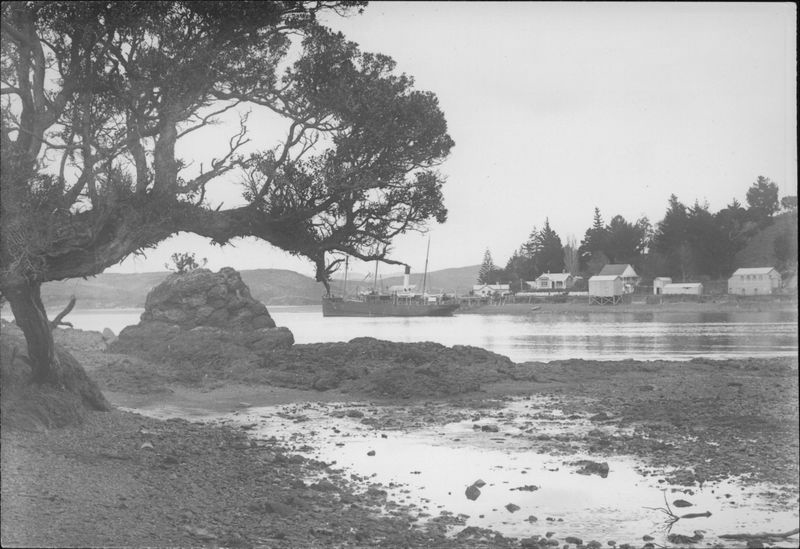
Mangōnui in 1902

The settlement began to serve the whalers at the beginning of the 19th century, and expanded into a trading port with kauri sawmills and farming. It became the main centre for the Far North in the 1860s, with shipping services to Auckland, and a hospital. Kaitaia became the more important centre for the kauri and kauri gum industries in the early 20th century. The government offices moved to Kaitaia in 1918, and the hospital closed in 1934. The port lost importance as roads improved and industries declined in the 1950s. It remains a fishing and farming support centre, and a tourist destination.

The first European settler is considered to be James David Berghan from Ireland, who arrived in Mangonui in 1831. By the later half of the 19th century, flax and timber industries were flourishing in the area. Other settlers developed farms and businesses in the area while some married into the native population. The dynamic mix of settlers coming from various parts of Europe and the Maori population provided Mangonui with a rich heritage. It became the main centre for the Far North in the 1860s, with shipping services to Auckland, and a hospital.

== Demographics ==
Statistics New Zealand describes Mangōnui as a rural settlement. It covers 4.39 km^{2} (1.69 sq mi) and had an estimated population of 670 as of June 2025, with a population density of 153 people per km^{2}. Mangōnui is part of the larger Doubtless Bay statistical area.

Historical population
Year	Pop.	±% p.a.
2006	510	—
2013	522	+0.33%
2018	573	+1.88%
2023	672	+3.24%

Mangōnui had a population of 672 in the 2023 New Zealand census, an increase of 99 people (17.3%) since the 2018 census, and an increase of 150 people (28.7%) since the 2013 census. There were 336 males, 333 females and 6 people of other genders in 279 dwellings. 2.7% of people identified as LGBTIQ+. The median age was 54.5 years (compared with 38.1 years nationally). There were 105 people (15.6%) aged under 15 years, 90 (13.4%) aged 15 to 29, 273 (40.6%) aged 30 to 64, and 207 (30.8%) aged 65 or older.

People could identify as more than one ethnicity. The results were 76.3% European (Pākehā); 39.7% Māori; 2.7% Pasifika; 2.7% Asian; 0.9% Middle Eastern, Latin American and African New Zealanders (MELAA); and 1.8% other, which includes people giving their ethnicity as "New Zealander". English was spoken by 96.9%, Māori language by 7.6%, Samoan by 0.4% and other languages by 6.7%. No language could be spoken by 2.2% (e.g. too young to talk). New Zealand Sign Language was known by 0.9%. The percentage of people born overseas was 17.4, compared with 28.8% nationally.

Religious affiliations were 34.4% Christian, 0.4% Hindu, 0.4% Islam, 2.2% Māori religious beliefs, 0.4% Buddhist, 0.9% New Age, and 0.4% other religions. People who answered that they had no religion were 49.6%, and 10.3% of people did not answer the census question.

Of those at least 15 years old, 72 (12.7%) people had a bachelor's or higher degree, 288 (50.8%) had a post-high school certificate or diploma, and 186 (32.8%) people exclusively held high school qualifications. The median income was $26,400, compared with $41,500 nationally. 30 people (5.3%) earned over $100,000 compared to 12.1% nationally. The employment status of those at least 15 was that 168 (29.6%) people were employed full-time, 96 (16.9%) were part-time, and 15 (2.6%) were unemployed.

== Education ==
Mangonui School is a contributing primary (years 1–6) school with a roll of 161 students as of July 2026. The school opened in 1858, and one of the original buildings is still in use as the school library. The nearest secondary schooling is at Taipa Area School in Taipā.
