= Coopers Beach =

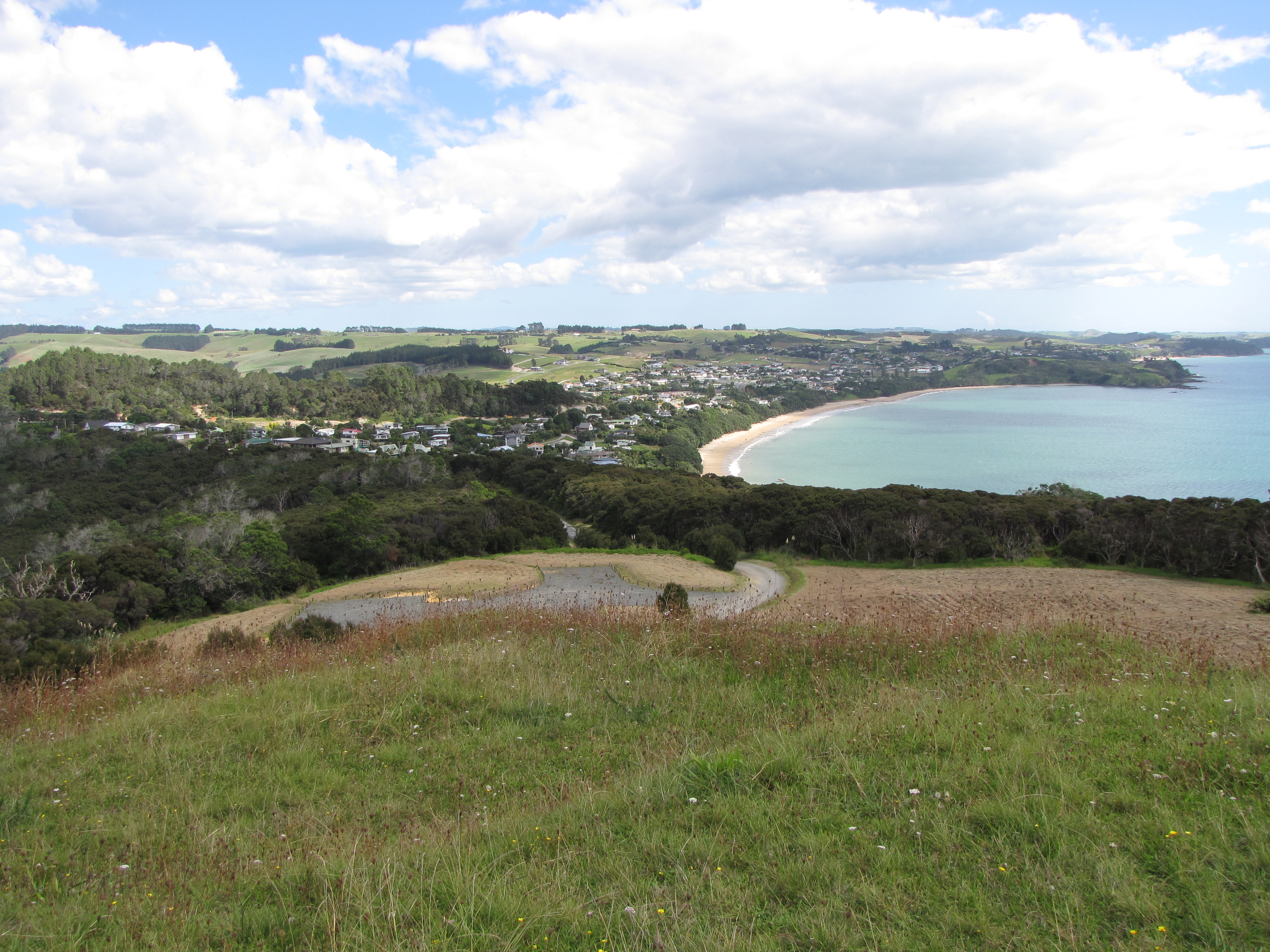
- Coopers Beach from Rangikapiti Pā
- Interactive map of Coopers Beach
- Coordinates: 34.993°S 173.509°E
- Country: New Zealand
- Region: Northland Region
- District: Far North District
- Ward: Te Hiku
- Community: Te Hiku
- Subdivision: Doubtless Bay
- Electorates: Northland; Te Tai Tokerau

Government
  - Territorial Authority: Far North District Council
  - Regional council: Northland Regional Council
  - Mayor of Far North: Moko Tepania
  - Northland MP: Grant McCallum
  - Te Tai Tokerau MP: TBD

Area
  - Total: 1.72 km^{2} (0.66 sq mi)

Population (June 2025)
  - Total: 670
  - Density: 390/km^{2} (1,000/sq mi)

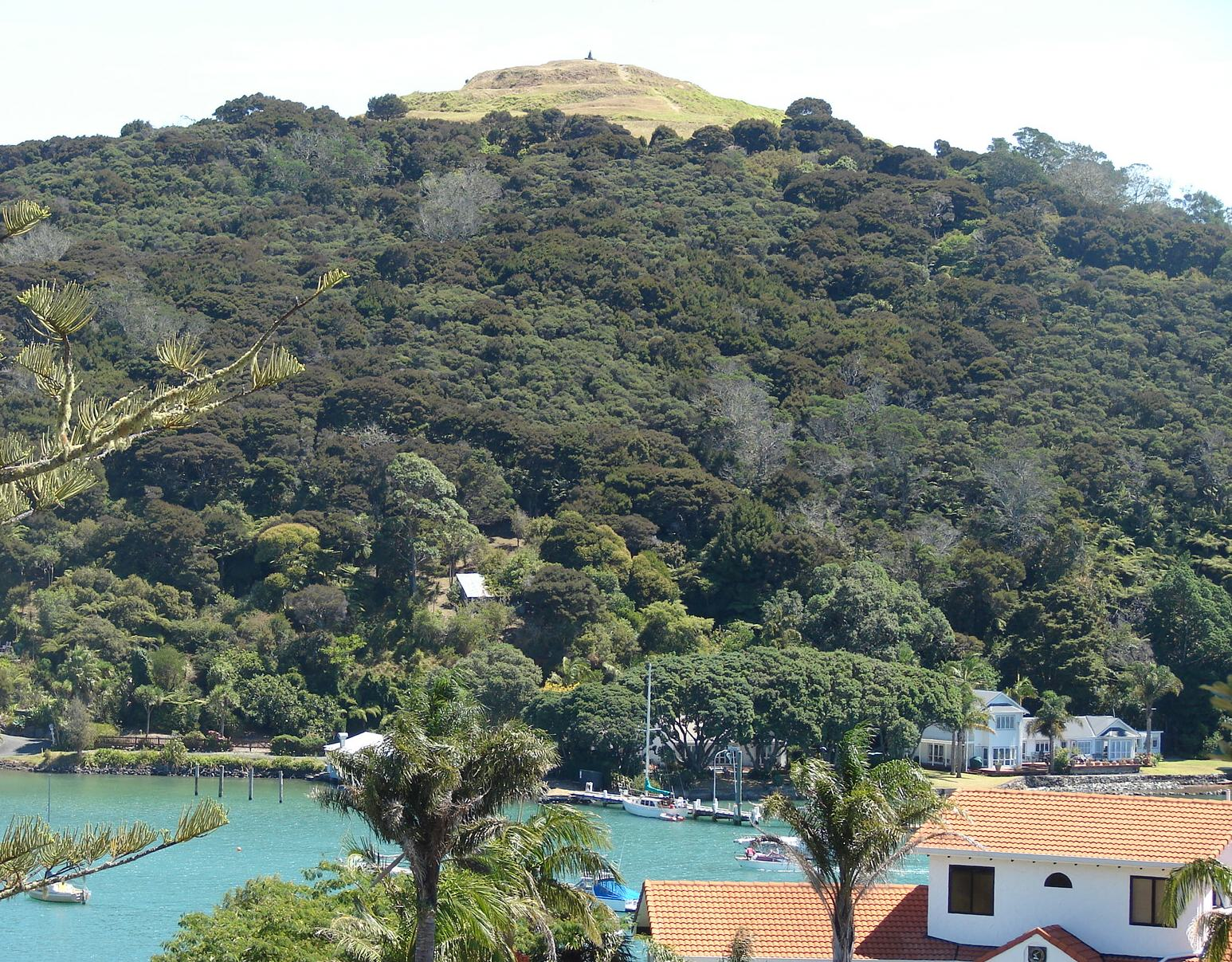
Rangikapiti Pā from Mangōnui

Coopers Beach is a settlement on the southern side of Doubtless Bay in Northland, New Zealand. State Highway 10 runs through it. It is one of the Taipā–Mangōnui string of settlements, separated from Cable Bay on the west by Otanenui Stream and from Mangōnui on the east by Mill Bay Road.

The settlement is named for coopers who build and repair barrels.

Taumarumaru Reserve on the western side of Coopers Beach contains three pā sites. Taumarumaru Pā is on the central ridge, with Ohumuhumu Pā and Otanenui Pā on the headland.

Rangikapiti Pā is a heritage site northeast of Coopers Beach which retains terraces and a defensive ditch around the pā.

== Demographics ==
Statistics New Zealand describes Coopers Beach as a rural settlement. It covers 1.72 km^{2} (0.66 sq mi) and had an estimated population of 670 as of June 2025, with a population density of 390 people per km^{2}. Coopers Beach is part of the larger Doubtless Bay statistical area.

Historical population
Year	Pop.	±% p.a.
2006	432	—
2013	462	+0.96%
2018	573	+4.40%
2023	648	+2.49%

Coopers Beach had a population of 648 in the 2023 New Zealand census, an increase of 75 people (13.1%) since the 2018 census, and an increase of 186 people (40.3%) since the 2013 census. There were 294 males and 351 females in 309 dwellings. 1.9% of people identified as LGBTIQ+. The median age was 59.2 years (compared with 38.1 years nationally). There were 102 people (15.7%) aged under 15 years, 54 (8.3%) aged 15 to 29, 231 (35.6%) aged 30 to 64, and 258 (39.8%) aged 65 or older.

People could identify as more than one ethnicity. The results were 77.8% European (Pākehā); 33.8% Māori; 5.6% Pasifika; 4.2% Asian; 0.9% Middle Eastern, Latin American and African New Zealanders (MELAA); and 4.2% other, which includes people giving their ethnicity as "New Zealander". English was spoken by 97.7%, Māori language by 10.2%, Samoan by 0.9% and other languages by 6.0%. No language could be spoken by 1.4% (e.g. too young to talk). New Zealand Sign Language was known by 0.9%. The percentage of people born overseas was 18.5, compared with 28.8% nationally.

Religious affiliations were 38.4% Christian, 2.8% Māori religious beliefs, 0.5% Buddhist, 0.5% New Age, and 2.8% other religions. People who answered that they had no religion were 46.8%, and 7.4% of people did not answer the census question.

Of those at least 15 years old, 93 (17.0%) people had a bachelor's or higher degree, 297 (54.4%) had a post-high school certificate or diploma, and 135 (24.7%) people exclusively held high school qualifications. The median income was $27,900, compared with $41,500 nationally. 33 people (6.0%) earned over $100,000 compared to 12.1% nationally. The employment status of those at least 15 was that 153 (28.0%) people were employed full-time, 75 (13.7%) were part-time, and 12 (2.2%) were unemployed.
