= Taipa (disambiguation) =

Taipa is an island in Macau, China.

Taipa may also refer to:

- Taipa Beach, Central Sulawesi, Indonesia
- Taipā, a town in New Zealand
- Taipā River, New Zealand
- Taipā–Mangōnui, a conurbation in New Zealand
- Teip, or taipa, a clan organisation of some peoples from the Caucasus
- Rammed earth, or taipa, a building technique

== See also ==
- Rana longicrus, also known as Taipa frog
