= Doubtless Bay =

Bay in the Northland Region, North Island, New Zealand

Coordinates: 34°55′41″S 173°26′34″E

- Bay
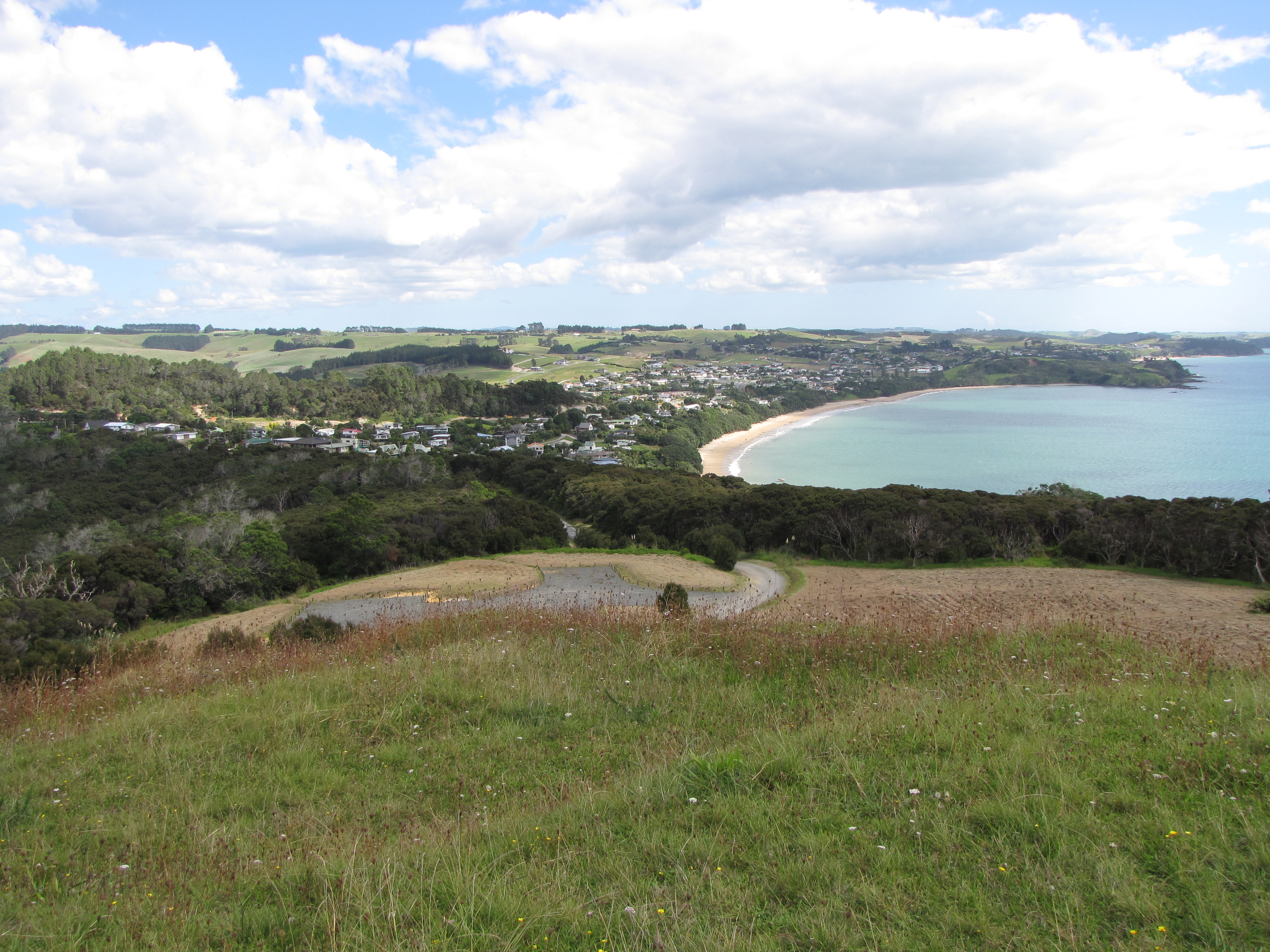
- View of Coopers Beach from Rangikapiti pā
- Interactive map of Doubtless Bay

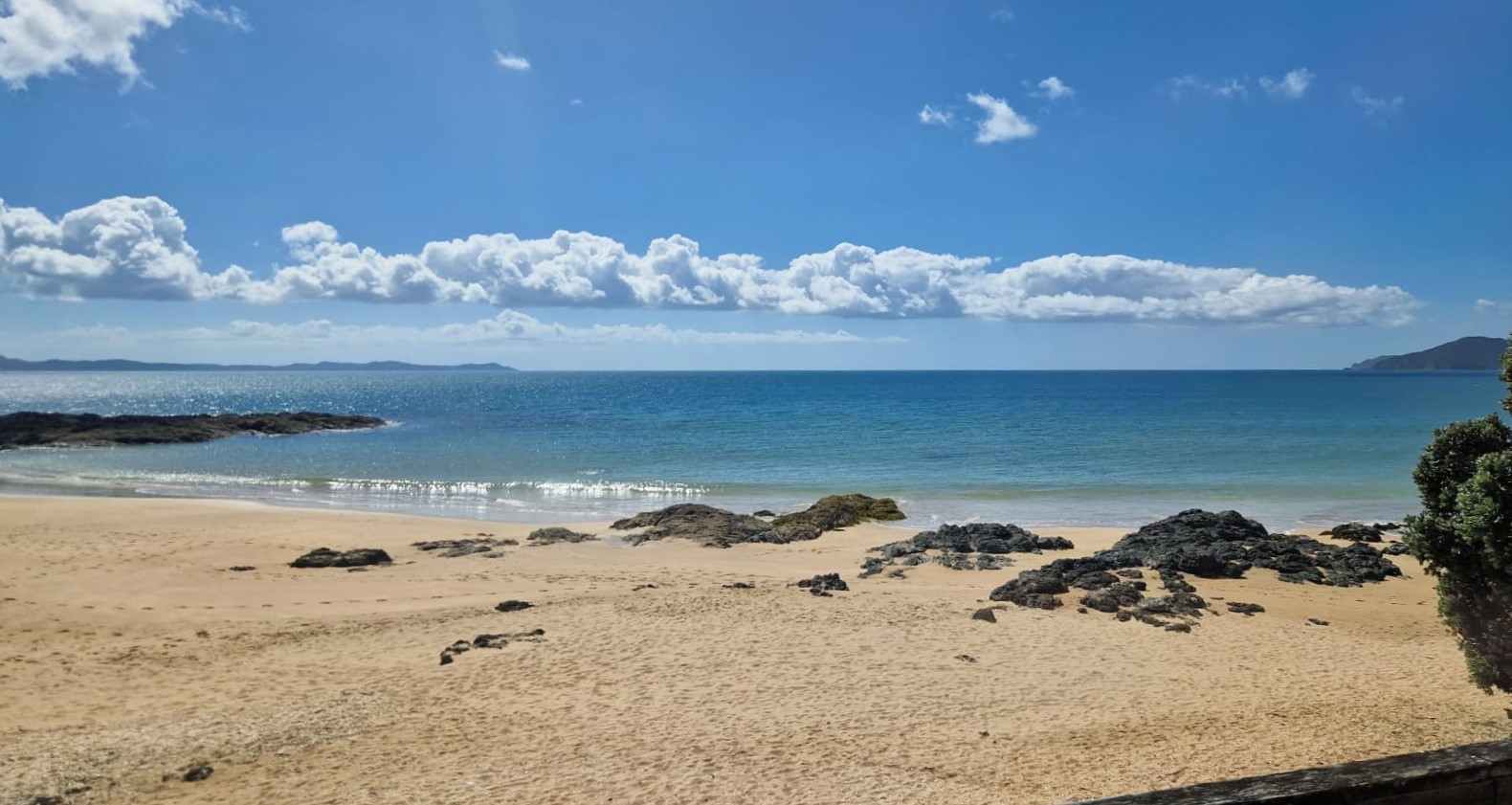
The expanse of Doubtless Bay viewed from Cable Bay

Doubtless Bay is a large inlet on the east coast of the North Island of New Zealand, north-east of the town of Kaitaia, in the Far North District, Northland. It extends from Knuckle Point on Karikari Peninsula in the north to Berghan Point at Hihi in the south. There are rocky headlands, the long Tokerau Beach, smaller beaches such as Taipā, Cable Bay and Coopers Beach, and the largely estuarial Mangonui Harbour. A more-or-less contiguous string of settlements make up Taipā–Mangōnui, which is the largest urban area north of Kaitaia.

== Māori discovery ==
Kupe, the Māori discoverer of New Zealand, is said to have made his initial landfall at Taipā, in Doubtless Bay.

== European contact ==
Doubtless Bay was named by Captain James Cook during his first voyage of Pacific exploration in 1769. When Cook sailed past the entrance to the area, he recorded in his journal "doubtless a bay", hence the name. Poor weather prevented Cook from entering the bay proper, though a number of Māori longboats put out from shore to come alongside Cook's ship Endeavour and sell fish to her crew. Less than two weeks later, Jean-François-Marie de Surville anchored his ship the Saint Jean Baptiste in the bay. In retaliation for the theft of a longboat which had gone adrift after his ship had dragged her anchor in a storm and narrowly escaped destruction, he carried off a Māori chief and set his village on fire. While at Doubtless Bay at Christmas 1769, de Surville's chaplain Father Paul-Antoine Léonard de Villefeix OP conducted the first Christian service in New Zealand.

Doubtless Bay became the first location in New Zealand where a whaling ship visited, when in 1792 the William and Ann visited the bay. Whaling stations operated on the shores of the bay in the 19th century.

The area was a centre of kauri gum extraction.

== Citations ==
- Beaglehole, J.C., ed. (1968). The Journals of Captain James Cook on His Voyages of Discovery, vol. I:The Voyage of the Endeavour 1768–1771. Cambridge University Press. OCLC 223185477.
