= Kaitaia Borough =

Former municipal administrative division of New Zealand

- Borough of New Zealand
- Interactive map of Kaitaia Borough
- Coordinates: 35°6′45″S 173°15′46″E
- Established: 1 September 1945

Government
  - Body: Kaitaia Borough Council

Area
  - Total: 6.95 km^{2} (2.68 sq mi)

Population (1987)
  - Total: 5,070

Kaitaia Borough (also known as the Borough of Kaitaia) was a borough of New Zealand that existed from 1945 until the 1989 reforms to local government, being the administrative division for the town of Kaitaia in Northland. It was governed by the Kaitaia Borough Council.

== History ==
At a meeting of the Kaitaia Town Board on 15 June 1944, the board decided that they should pursue becoming a borough, the town having reached over 1,000 people in the recent census.

Following a poll of residents on 25 July 1945 in which the choice to become a borough succeeded, the borough was proclaimed to exist from 1 September 1945 in the New Zealand Gazette.

Kaitaia Borough Poll
Choice	Votes	%
For a Borough	189	96.92
Against a Borough	4	2.05
Informal	2	1.03
Turnout	195	
Result:	Kaitaia Borough approved	

A competition for the borough's crest and motto was held on 27 September 1950 sponsored by the Kaitaia and District Progressive Society. Twelve entries were received. The Borough Council decided at a meeting on 9 October 1950 from amongst the entries, choosing a design by a Alfred Theed (the County Engineer for Mangonui County). The crest featured inside a belt an image of a kauri tree, a sailing ship and work tools. The motto was "Deo Adjuvante, Non Timendum" which translates from Latin to "With God Assisting, We Fear Nothing".

It ceased to exist from 1 November 1989 as part of nation-wide reforms to local government instituted by the Fourth Labour Government. The town of Kaitaia was incorporated into the Far North District and the borough council's responsibilities were taken over by said district's council.
