= Taipā =

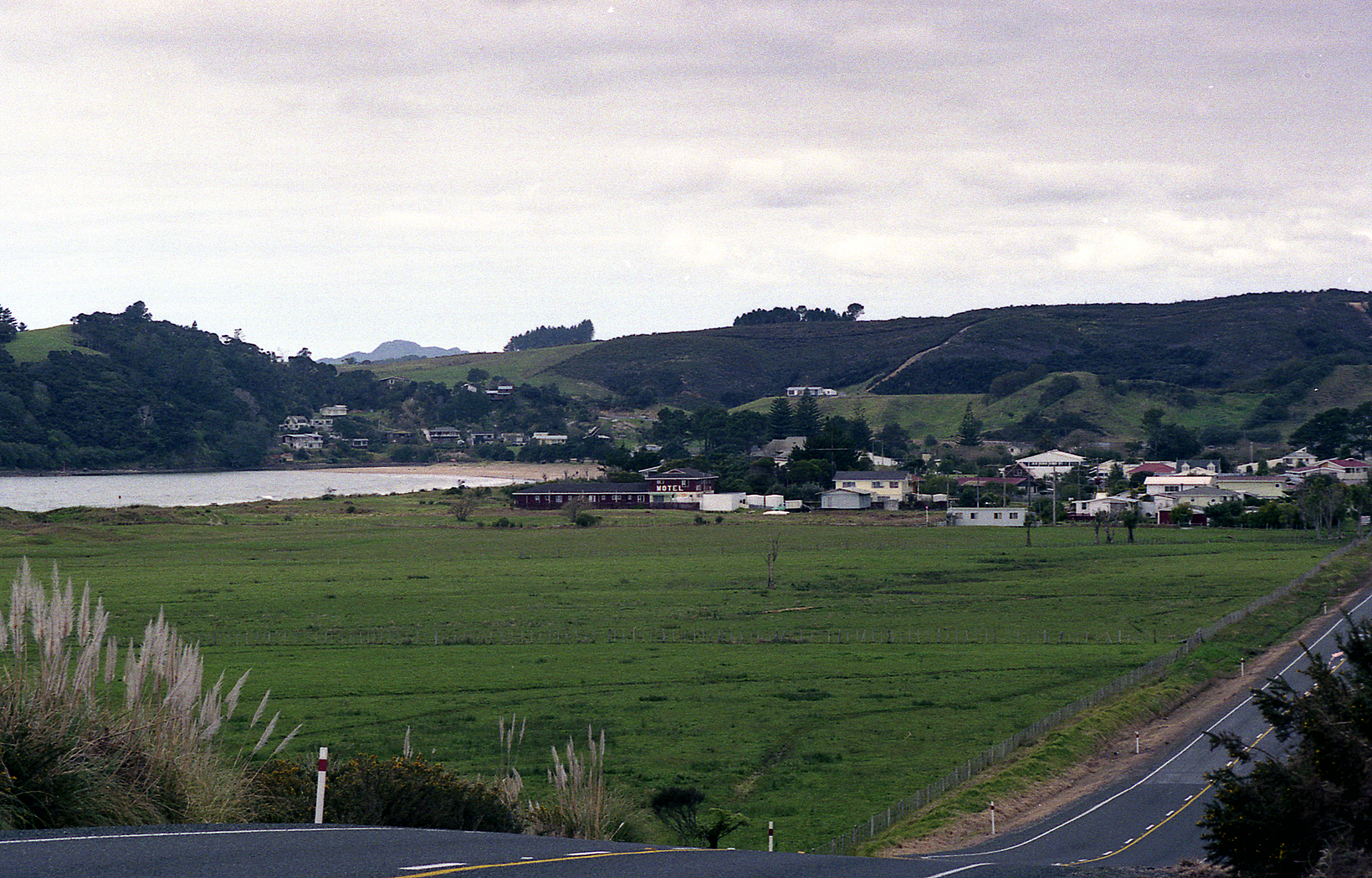
- Taipā in 1992
- Interactive map of Taipā
- Coordinates: 34°59′46″S 173°27′43″E
- Country: New Zealand
- Region: Northland Region
- District: Far North District
- Ward: Te Hiku
- Community: Te Hiku
- Subdivision: Doubtless Bay
- Electorates: Northland; Te Tai Tokerau

Government
  - Territorial Authority: Far North District Council
  - Regional council: Northland Regional Council
  - Mayor of Far North: Moko Tepania
  - Northland MP: Grant McCallum
  - Te Tai Tokerau MP: TBD

Area
  - Total: 0.54 km^{2} (0.21 sq mi)

Population (June 2025)
  - Total: 160
  - Density: 300/km^{2} (770/sq mi)

Taipā (formerly spelled Taipa) is a settlement on the southern side of Doubtless Bay in Northland, New Zealand. State Highway 10 runs through it. It is the westernmost of the Taipā–Mangōnui string of settlements, and separated from the others by the Taipā River.

Taipā is believed to be the landing place of Kupe, the legendary Polynesian explorer, according to Māori tradition. There is a memorial near the bridge over the Taipā River.

The name may have originated as Taiapa, a fence between two disputed shellfish beds. In 2026, the spelling of the settlement's name was officially altered from Taipa to Taipā.

== Demographics ==
Statistics New Zealand describes Taipā as a rural settlement. It covers 0.54 km^{2} (0.21 sq mi) and had an estimated population of 160 as of June 2025, with a population density of 296 people per km^{2}. Taipā is part of the larger Doubtless Bay statistical area.

Historical population
Year	Pop.	±% p.a.
2006	126	—
2013	135	+0.99%
2018	159	+3.33%
2023	153	−0.77%

Taipā had a population of 153 in the 2023 New Zealand census, a decrease of 6 people (−3.8%) since the 2018 census, and an increase of 18 people (13.3%) since the 2013 census. There were 78 males and 78 females in 66 dwellings. 3.9% of people identified as LGBTIQ+. The median age was 53.0 years (compared with 38.1 years nationally). There were 21 people (13.7%) aged under 15 years, 18 (11.8%) aged 15 to 29, 60 (39.2%) aged 30 to 64, and 54 (35.3%) aged 65 or older.

People could identify as more than one ethnicity. The results were 68.6% European (Pākehā), 41.2% Māori, 9.8% Pasifika, and 5.9% Asian. English was spoken by 100.0%, Māori language by 17.6%, Samoan by 3.9% and other languages by 2.0%. The percentage of people born overseas was 13.7, compared with 28.8% nationally.

Religious affiliations were 29.4% Christian, 3.9% Hindu, 5.9% Māori religious beliefs, and 2.0% Buddhist. People who answered that they had no religion were 54.9%, and 3.9% of people did not answer the census question.

Of those at least 15 years old, 15 (11.4%) people had a bachelor's or higher degree, 72 (54.5%) had a post-high school certificate or diploma, and 39 (29.5%) people exclusively held high school qualifications. The median income was $29,600, compared with $41,500 nationally. 12 people (9.1%) earned over $100,000 compared to 12.1% nationally. The employment status of those at least 15 was that 51 (38.6%) people were employed full-time, 12 (9.1%) were part-time, and 6 (4.5%) were unemployed.

== Education ==
Taipa Area School is a coeducational composite (years 1–15) school with a roll of 421 students as of July 2026. The school opened as Taipa District High School in 1956, and became an area school in 1976.

A school existed at Taipā in 1883 and was eventually replaced by the District High School.

== Marae ==
The Taipā area has one Ngāti Kahu marae:

- Taipa Marae and meeting house - Karepori, a meeting place of the hapū of Matakairiri / Pikaahu.
