= Te Paatu =

#REDIRECT Kaitaia

- From a subtopic: This is a redirect from a subtopic of the target article or section.
  - If the redirected subtopic could potentially have its own article in the future, then also tag the redirect with {{R with possibilities}} and {{R printworthy}}.
- With possibilities: This is a redirect from a title that potentially could be expanded into a new article. The topic described by this title may be more detailed than is currently provided on the target page or in a section of that page.
  - When the target page becomes too large, or for any reason a new page would be an improvement, this redirect may be replaced with an article, template or other project page that is carved out of the target page. See also {{R to section}} and use together with this rcat when appropriate.
  - If the topic of the redirect is not susceptible to expansion, then use other rcats such as {{R to section}} or {{R to list entry}} when appropriate.
  - Since a new page may be created, links to this redirect should not be replaced with a direct link to the target page. To make redirects to this page, use {{R avoided double redirect}}.
  - {{R printworthy}} should be used together with this template when applied to a redirect in mainspace.
  - When used on a template redirect, it will automatically populate Category:Template redirects with possibilities.
- From a printworthy page title: This is a redirect from a title that would be helpful in a printed or CD/DVD version of Wikipedia. See Wikipedia:Printability and Version 1.0 Editorial Team for more information.
