= 2019 Far North District Council election =

Local election in New Zealand

The 2019 Far North District Council election took place between September and October 2019 by postal vote in Far North District in New Zealand to elect a mayor of Far North District council, 9 councillors, and 19 community board members.

== Mayoral election ==
There were 11 candidates running for Mayor of Far North District. They are listed below in alphabetical order. The incumbent mayor- John Carter- was re-elected. Carter served since the 2013 New Zealand local elections. Candidates with no listed party affiliation are listed as unaffiliated.

=== Candidates ===
Affiliation	Candidate
Independent	John Edward Bassett
Unaffiliated	Harko Brown
Unaffiliated	John Carter
Unaffiliated	Peter Gill
Unaffiliated	Jay Hepi
Unaffiliated	Dave Bear Hookway
Unaffiliated	Monty Knight
Unaffiliated	John Levers
Unaffiliated	Kuini Matene
Unaffiliated	Tania McInnes
Unaffiliated	JT Tahana

=== Results ===
2019 Far North local elections: Mayor of Far North
Party	Candidate	Votes	%
Unaffiliated	John Carter	5,831	28.97
Unaffiliated	Tania McInnes	3,903	19.39
Unaffiliated	Dave Hookway	3,520	17.49
Unaffiliated	Monty Knight	2,345	11.65
Unaffiliated	Jay Hepi	1,249	6.20
Unaffiliated	Peter Gill	985	4.89
Unaffiliated	Harko Brown	802	3.98
Unaffiliated	John Levers	612	3.04
Unaffiliated	JT Tahana	354	1.76
Independent	John Edward Bassett	291	1.45
Unaffiliated	Kuini Matene	239	1.19
Majority		1,928	9.58

== District council ==
There were 9 councillors in Far North District Council, elected from 3 multi-member wards. The 3 wards are Bay of Islands-Whangaroa, Kaikohe-Hokianga Ward and Te Hiku Ward.

=== Bay of Islands-Whangaroa ===
Bay of Islands-Whangaroa ward elects 4 members to the Far North District Council. It contains, among others, Kerikeri, the eponymous Whangaroa, Paihia and Kawakawa. There were 15 candidates running for Bay of Islands-Whangaroa ward. They are listed below in alphabetical order.

==== Candidates ====
Affiliation	Candidate
Unaffiliated	Harko Brown
Independent	David Clendon
Independent	Rodger Corbin
Unaffiliated	Ann Court
Unaffiliated	Peter Gill
Unaffiliated	Ruth Heta
Unaffiliated	Jane Ellen Johnston
Unaffiliated	Chris Joseph
Unaffiliated	Hone Mihaka
Independent	Frank Owen
Unaffiliated	Maxine Shortland
Independent	Rachel Smith
Unaffiliated	Mike Stevens
Unaffiliated	Kelly Stratford
Unaffiliated	Steve Wilce

=== Kaikohe-Hokianga ===
Kaikohe-Hoikianga ward elects 2 members to the Far North District Council. It contains, among others, the eponymous Kaikohe, Rawene and Oponi. There were 12 candidates running for Kaikohe-Hokianga ward. They are listed below in alphabetical order.

==== Candidates ====
Affiliation	Candidate
Independent	Rawhiti Erstich Coles
Unaffiliated	Jay Hepi
Independent	Babe Kapa
Independent	Sally Macauley
Unaffiliated	Kuini Matene
Unaffiliated	Lily Rawson
Unaffiliated	Marara Rogers
Unaffiliated	Te Arani Angeline Te Haara
Unaffiliated	Moko Tepania
Unaffiliated	Louis Toorenburg
Unaffiliated	John Vujcich
Unaffiliated	Rhondda Zielinski

=== Te Hiku ===
Te Hiku ward elects 3 members to the Far North District Council. It contains, among others, Kaitaia, Awanui, Whatuwhiwhi and Te Kao. There were 15 candidates running for Te Hiku ward. They are listed below in alphabetical order.

==== Candidates ====
Affiliation	Candidate
Unaffiliated	Naomi Austin-Read
Unaffiliated	Ian Bamber
Unaffiliated	Sue Bradford
Unaffiliated	David Collard
Unaffiliated	Felicity Foy
Unaffiliated	Lillian Karaka
Independent	Sacha Kearney-Yanke
Independent	Jason Kerrison
Unaffiliated	Barry Murray
Independent	Mark Osborne
Unaffiliated	Lyle Painting
Unaffiliated	Mate Radich
Unaffiliated	JT Tahana
Unaffiliated	Niki Tauhara
Independent	Hazely Windelborn

== Community boards ==
Elections were required for 3 community boards located in the Far North District. These were the 7-member Bay of Islands-Whangaroa Community Board, the 6-member Kaikohe-Hokianga Community Board, and the 6-member Te Hiku Community Board.

=== Bay of Islands-Whangaroa Community Board ===
The Bay of Islands-Whangaroa Community Board consists of 7 members and contains 4 single-member subdivisions and 1 multi-member subdivision.

==== Kawakawa-Moerewa ====
Kawakawa-Moerewa subdivision elects 1 member to the Bay of Islands-Whangaroa Community Board.

===== Candidates =====
Affiliation	Candidate
Unaffiliated	Lucie Green
Unaffiliated	Manuwai Wells

==== Kerikeri ====
Kerikeri subdivision elects 3 members to the Bay of Islands-Whangaroa Community Board. As the number of nominated candidates was equal to the amount of vacancies, all candidates were elected unopposed.

===== Results =====
Affiliation	Candidate	Votes	%
Unaffiliated	Lane Ayr	Elected unopposed	
Independent	Frank Owen	Elected unopposed	
Independent	Rachel Smith	Elected unopposed	

==== Paihia ====
Paihia subdivision elects 1 member to the Bay of Islands-Whangaroa Community Board.

===== Candidates =====
Affiliation	Candidate
Unaffiliated	Belinda Ward
Unaffiliated	Steve Wilce

==== Russell-Opua ====
Russell-Opua subdivision elects 1 member to the Bay of Islands-Whangaroa Community Board.

===== Candidates =====
Affiliation	Candidate
Unaffiliated	Gray Phillips
Unaffiliated	Wiki Walker

==== Whangaroa ====
Whangaroa subdivision elects 1 member to the Bay of Islands-Whangaroa Community Board.

===== Candidates =====
Affiliation	Candidate
Unaffiliated	Ruth Heta
Unaffiliated	Bruce Mills

=== Kaikohe-Hokianga Community Board ===
The Kaikohe-Hokianga Community Board consists of 6 members and contains 1 single-member subdivision and 2 multi-member subdivisions.

==== Kaikohe ====
Kaikohe subdivision elects 3 members to the Kaikohe-Hokianga Community Board.

===== Candidates =====
Affiliation	Candidate
Independent	David Adams
Unaffiliated	Laurie Byers
Unaffiliated	Mike Edmonds
Unaffiliated	Mara Pickery
Unaffiliated	Lily Rawson
Unaffiliated	Shaun Kavanagh Reilly
Unaffiliated	Moko Tepania
Unaffiliated	Kelly van Gaalen

==== North Hokianga ====
North Hokianga subdivision elects 1 member to the Kaikohe-Hokianga Community Board.

===== Candidates =====
Affiliation	Candidate
Unaffiliated	Emma Davis
Independent	Richard Nahi

==== South Hokianga ====
South Hokianga subdivision elects 2 members to the Kaikohe-Hokianga Community Board. As the number of nominated candidates was equal to the amount of vacancies, all candidates were elected unopposed.

===== Results =====
Affiliation	Candidate	Votes	%
Unaffiliated	Alan Phillip Hessell	Elected unopposed	
Unaffiliated	Louis Toorenburg	Elected unopposed	

=== Te Hiku Community Board ===
The Te Hiku Community Board consists of 6 members and contains 3 single-member subdivisions and 1 multi-member subdivision.

==== Doubtless Bay ====
Doubtless Bay subdivision elects 1 member to the Te Hiku Community Board.

===== Candidates =====
Affiliation	Candidate
Unaffiliated	Sheryl Bainbridge
Unaffiliated	Nuu Ward
Independent	Martin Yuretich

==== Kaitaia ====
Kaitaia subdivision elects 3 members to the Te Hiku Community Board.

===== Candidates =====
Affiliation	Candidate
Unaffiliated	Jaqui Brown
Unaffiliated	Adele Gardner
Unaffiliated	Brownywn Hunt
Unaffiliated	Lyle Richard Painting
Unaffiliated	David Senior
Unaffiliated	John Stewart

==== North Cape ====
North Cape subdivision elects 1 member to the Te Hiku Community Board. As the number of nominated candidates was equal to the amount of vacancies, all candidates were elected unopposed.

===== Results =====
Affiliation	Candidate	Votes	%
Unaffiliated	Darren Carl Axe	Elected unopposed	

==== Whatuwhiwhi ====
Whatuwhiwhi subdivision elects 1 member to the Te Hiku Community Board.

===== Candidates =====
Affiliation	Candidate
Unaffiliated	Lawrie Atkinson
Unaffiliated	Eddie Bellas
Unaffiliated	Whetu Rutene
