= Lake Tairutu =

Lake in New Zealand

- Location within Northland Region
- Location: Far North District, Northland Region, North Island
- Coordinates: 35.4903°S 173.3762°E
- Basin countries: New Zealand

Lake Tairutu is a lake in the Far North District of Northland Region of New Zealand.

== See also ==
- List of lakes in New Zealand
