= Awapoko River =

Coordinates: 34.984089°S 173.424082°E

Location
- Country: New Zealand

Physical characteristics
- Mouth
  - location: Doubtless Bay
- Length: 2 km (1.2 mi)

Awapoko River is an estuary, almost 2 km (1.2 mi) long, where the Aurere and Parapara Streams merge before entering Doubtless Bay in the Northland Region of New Zealand. The small, steep sided Puketu Island is in the bay just to the east of the river mouth.

Ngāti Kahu lived in the area for about 700 years until most of their land was sold under government pressure in the 1850s. The present land use is predominantly a mix of agriculture, forestry, housing along SH10, indigenous vegetation and sand-dunes. Spotless crake, banded rail, bittern and herons live in the estuary. Despite court action in 2011, a 2016 report said the Aurere Stream "stands out in particular as having degraded water quality".

Te Aurere, a recreation of the waka used by Polynesians to settle New Zealand, was built and launched at Aurere in 1991–92. Construction of the Kupe Waka Centre on the banks of the river was begun by Hector Busby in 2014 and it opened in December 2022. It provides education and training for traditional Māori waka construction. The centre is affiliated with the Kaʻiwakīloumoku Cultural Center in Honolulu, Hawaii.
