= Maramataka =

Lunar calendar of the Māori people

The Maramataka (lit. 'moon-turning' in Māori) is the lunar calendar of the Māori people; it is traditionally used to assist in cycles of food gathering, such as fishing, eeling, and planting.

Within the calendar are 12 months, each month takes 30 days represented by their own moon phases from the new moon (whiro) through the full moon (atua) to the full waning (mutu). Linguists suggest that the names of these phases may indicate a split in the Eastern Polynesian language family that separates the Māori language in part of a proximal group with Hawaiian and Tahitian from a distal group that includes Marquesan and Rapa Nui, which could lead to further dating of migration and settlement patterns of Polynesians across the Pacific Ocean.

== Calendar ==
Following the arrival of Christian missionaries in the early 19th century, the Māori loaned English names for the days of the week and months of the Gregorian calendar year. Since about 1990, the Te Taura Whiri i te Reo Māori has puristically promoted traditional sets reflecting Māori ethnoastronomy and seasonal timekeeping.

Māori days of the week
| Day | English loanword | Puristic names | |
| Day | English loanword | Alternative | Other, prescribed |
|---|---|---|---|
| Monday | Mane | Rātahi | Rāhina |
| Tuesday | Tūrei | Rārua | Rātū |
| Wednesday | Wenerei | Rātoru | Rāapa |
| Thursday | Tāite | Rāwhā | Rāpare |
| Friday | Paraire | Rārima, Rāoka | Rāmere |
| Saturday | Rāhoroi/Hāterei | Rāhoroi | |
| Sunday | Rātapu/Wiki | Rātapu | |

Māori lunar calendar
| Corresponding Gregorian period | Traditional period | Name meaning | Description | Anglicisation |
|---|---|---|---|---|
| December–January | Kohi-tātea | "Fruit (tātea) harvest (kohi)" | "Fruits are now ripe, and man eats of the new food of the season." | Hānuere < January |
| January–February | Hui-tanguru | "swarming (hui) of the tanguru" | "The foot of Rūhī (a summer star) now rests upon the earth." | Pēpuere < February |
| February–March | Poutū-te-rangi | Altair | The crops are now harvested. | Māehe < March |
| March–April | Paenga-whāwhā | "Spreading (paenga) of the picking (whāwhā)" | "All straw is now stacked at the borders of the plantations." | Āperira < April |
| April–May | Haratua | "last round (tua) of work" | "Crops are now stored in pits. The tasks of man are finished." | Mei < May |
| May–June | Pipiri | "huddling" in reference to twin stars Hamal and Sheratan | "All things on earth are contracted because of the cold; likewise man." | Hune < June |
| June–July | Hōngongoi | "crouching [in front of the fire]" | "Man is now extremely cold and kindles fires before which he basks." | Hūrae < July |
| July–August | Here-turi-kōkā | "Wrapping (here) one's hands around their knees (turi)" i.e. knee-hugging while sitting | "The scorching effect of fire is seen on the knees of man." | Ākuhata < August |
| August–September | Mahuru | "Rising [of temperature]" | "The earth has now acquired warmth, as have vegetation and trees." | Hepetema < September |
| September–October | Whiringa-ā-nuku | "Warming of the earth (nuku)" | "The earth has now become quite warm." | Oketopa < October |
| October–November | Whiringa-ā-rangi | "Warming of the sky (rangi)" | "It has now become summer, and the sun has acquired strength." | Noema < November |
| November–December | Hakihea | | "Birds are now sitting in their nests." | Tīhema < December |

The two months following the harvest month of Poutū-te-rangi are unremarkable periods with little activity and may be customarily removed from the calendar.

== See also ==
- Matariki
- Rapa Nui calendar
