= Taipā River =

Coordinates: 34°59′S 173°28′E

Location
- Country: New Zealand

Physical characteristics
- Mouth
  - location: Doubtless Bay
- Length: 8 km (5.0 mi)

The Taipā River is a river of the northern Northland Region of New Zealand's North Island. It flows west then north, reaching the south of Doubtless Bay at the township of Taipā.

In 2026, the spelling of the river's name was officially altered from Taipa to Taipā.

== See also ==
- List of rivers of New Zealand
