= Kaitaia =

Town in Northland, New Zealand

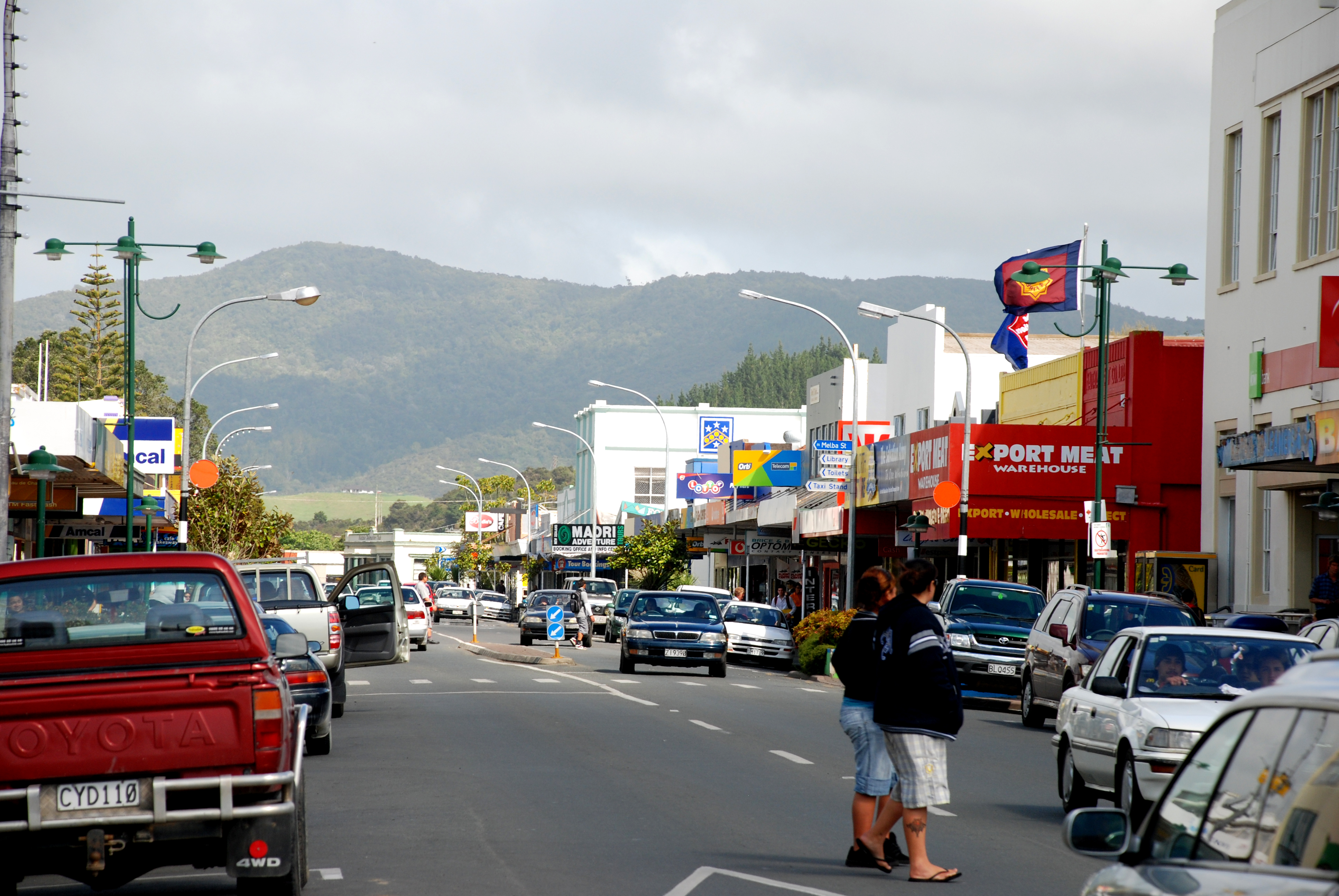
- Interactive map of Kaitaia
- Coordinates: 35°6′45″S 173°15′46″E
- Country: New Zealand
- Island: North Island
- Region: Northland
- Territorial authority: Far North District
- Ward: Te Hiku (General) / Ngā Tai o Tokerau (Māori)
- Community: Te Hiku
- Subdivision: Kaitāia
- Became town district: 1 December 1922
- Became borough: 1 September 1945
- Merged into Far North District: 1 November 1989
- Electorates: Northland; Te Tai Tokerau

Government
  - Territorial Authority: Far North District Council
  - Regional council: Northland Regional Council
  - Mayor of the Far North: Moko Tepania
  - Northland MP: Grant McCallum
  - Te Tai Tokerau MP: TBD

Area
  - Total: 8.48 km^{2} (3.27 sq mi)

Population (June 2025)
  - Total: 6,170
  - Density: 728/km^{2} (1,880/sq mi)
- Time zone: UTC+12 (NZST)
  - Summer (DST): UTC+13 (NZDT)
- Postcode(s): 0410
- Area code: 09

Kaitaia (Māori: Kaitāia) is a town in the Far North District of New Zealand, at the base of the Aupōuri Peninsula, about 160 km northwest of Whangārei. It is the last major settlement on State Highway 1. Ahipara Bay, the southern end of Te Oneroa-a-Tōhē / Ninety Mile Beach, is 5 kilometres (3.1 mi) west.

The main industries are forestry and tourism. The population is 6,170 as of June 2025, which makes it the second-largest town in the Far North District, after Kerikeri.

The name Kaitāia means 'ample food', kai being the Māori word for food.

The Muriwhenua are a group of six northern Māori iwi occupying the northernmost part of the North Island surrounding Kaitaia.

== History and culture ==
=== Pre-European settlement ===
Kaitaia, originally known as Ōrongotea, was the site of 15th century Māori explorer Tamatea Urehaea's pā, Tinotino. It was here where his son, Kahungunu, ancestor of the Ngāti Kahungunu and Te Aitanga-a-Māhaki iwi, was born.

=== European settlement ===
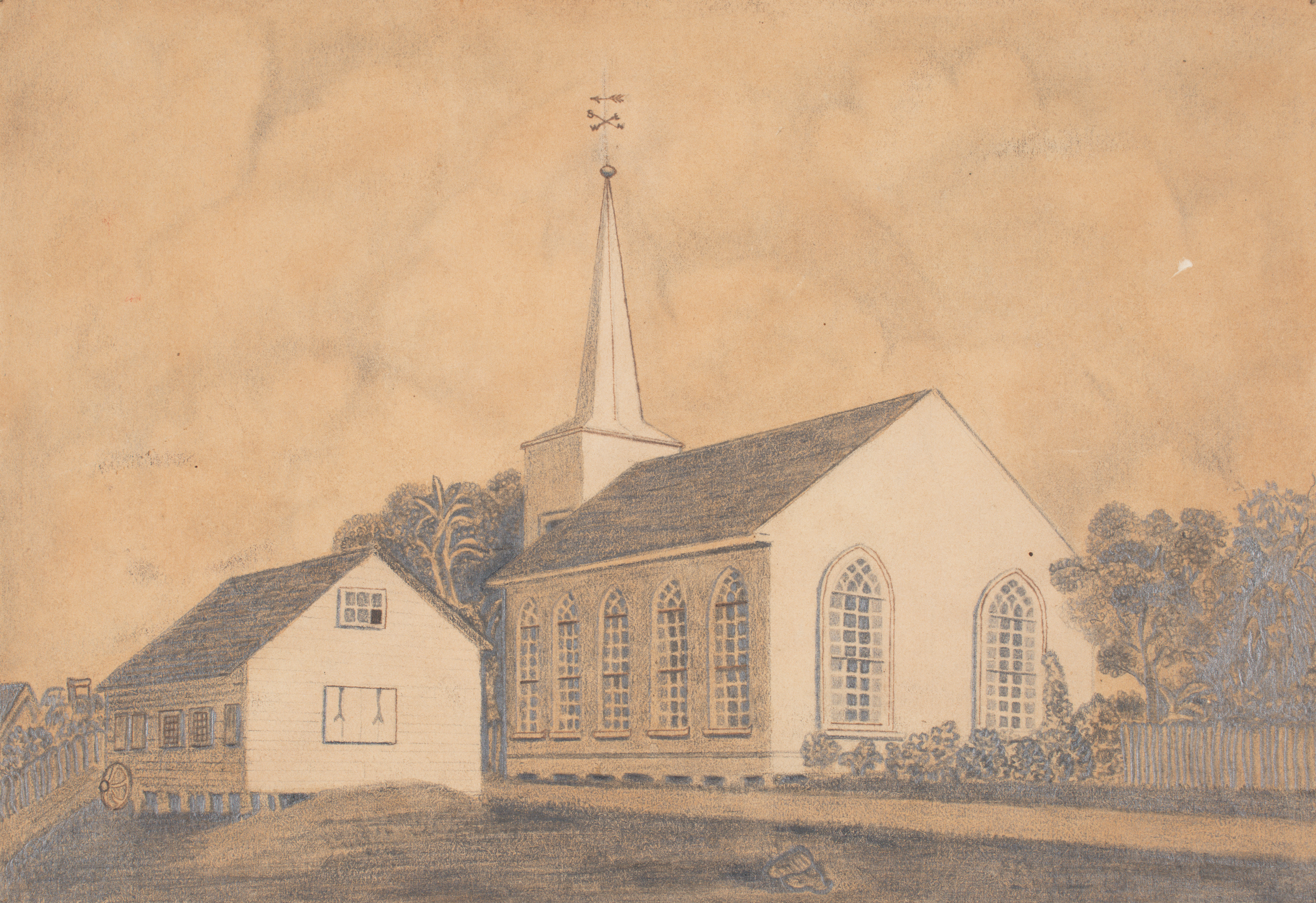
Drawing of the Kaitaia Church and schoolroom in 1862

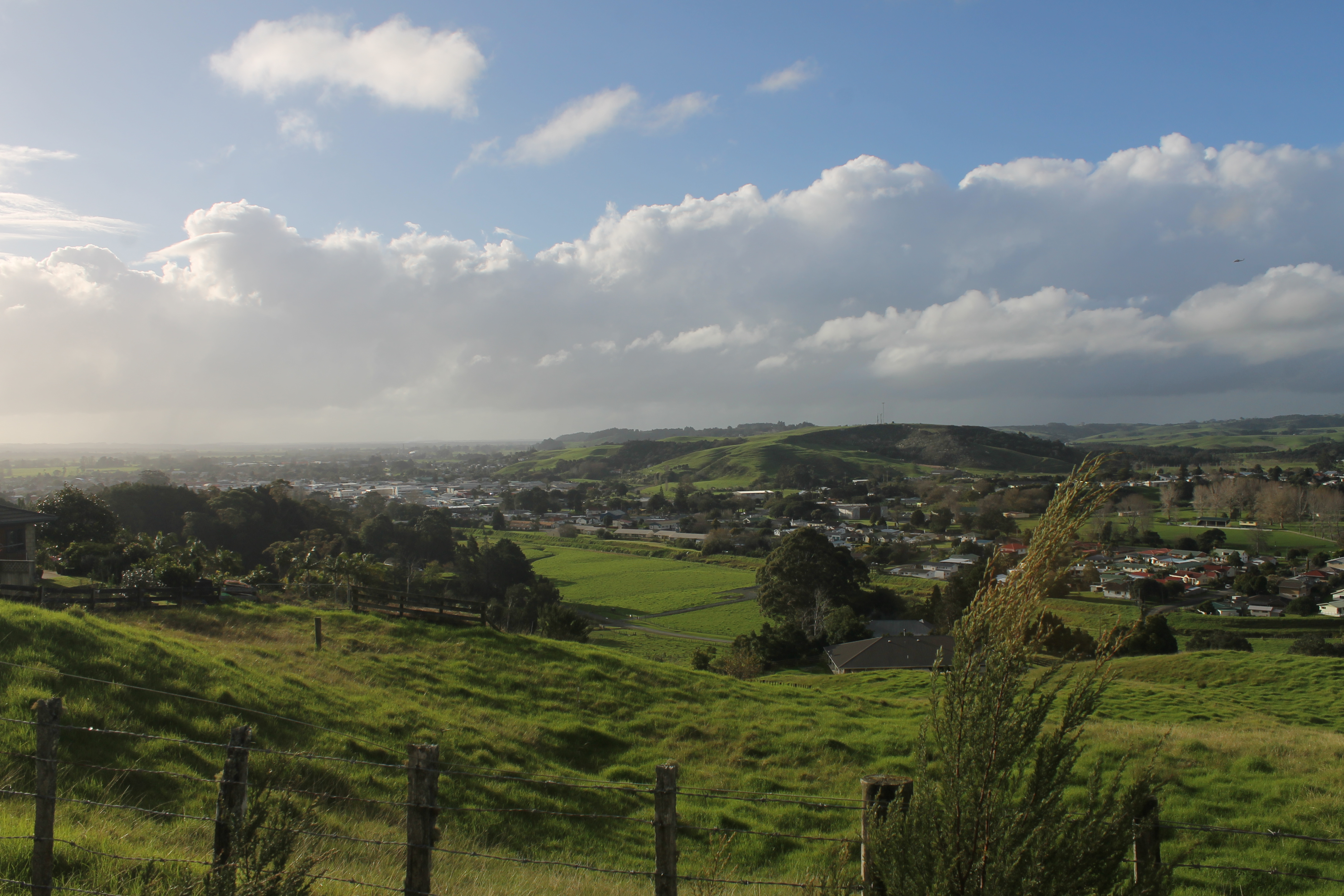
A landscape view of the southern part of Kaitaia taken on Okahu Road, the highest point in the town.

The Kaitaia Mission Station was established between 1833 and 1834 after a series of visits by Church Missionary Society (CMS) representatives including Samuel Marsden, and at different times, Joseph Matthews and William Gilbert Puckey. Puckey and Matthews had married two sisters, Matilda and Mary Ann Davis respectively, (daughters of Richard Davis, a lay missioner based at Waimate North). They formed a tight band, initially living together in raupo huts, and then in houses they built. As Puckey and the sisters were fluent in Māori, (Puckey having arrived in New Zealand in 1819 with his father, William Puckey, and the Davis family in 1823), they spoke Māori when together, to help Joseph Matthews pick up the language. In 1835, Mary-Ann and Matilda opened a school for girls and women, and Puckey and Joseph opened a school for boys and men. Both families grew and intermarried, forming the basis of the early Pākehā settler community. At one point, the Church Missionary Society decided that either Puckey or Matthews should move to a new location to the south to facilitate the spread of the word, but Nōpera Panakareao wrote a heartfelt letter to the CMS committee, pleading not to take away 'one of the two candlesticks'.

On 28 April 1840 Lieutenant Willboughby Shortland arrived in Kaitaia for the signing of the Treaty of Waitangi, held at Puckey's home. Shortland explained the Treaty, translated by Puckey into Māori. Those attending were told that British laws would not interfere with Māori customs but protect them from illegal land sales and lawless Pākehā. 61 Te Rarewa signed, having been urged by Nōpera Pana-kareao to do so. Less than a year later, Pana-kareao and the chiefs' meaning of the Treaty was reversed, as described by Richard Taylor in his journal, written on 25 January 1841, when it became clear to them that the substance of the land would go to the Queen, leaving just 'the shadow' as their portion.

In February 1841, about 500 Māori were present at a CMS service. In 1852 arguments developed between one chief and his tribe, however the impact of the missionaries meant that the old ways of settling disputes had passed.

Richard Matthews, the brother of Rev. Joseph Matthews, arrived in the Bay of Islands in December 1835 and for a time, joined his brother in Kaitaia. Richard Matthews had been a lay missionary on the second voyage of HMS Beagle with Charles Darwin. Richard Matthews served the CMS as a lay catechist at Kaitaia. In 1838 he married Johanna Blomfield, the sister of Mrs Martha Blomfield Clarke, whose husband George was a CMS missionary at Te Waimate mission. In 1840 Richard and Johanna Matthews helped set up a missionary station at Whanganui.

There were plans to extend the Okaihau Branch railway to Kaitaia and construction was started in the 1920s, but with the line nearly complete to Rangiahua, a review in 1936 determined that the line would not be viable and construction was abandoned. The line terminated in Okaihau until it was closed on 1 November 1987. D 221, a steam tank locomotive, has been on static display at Centennial Park since 1967.

=== 21st century ===
In October 2020, a fire occurred at the former Kaitaia Bowling Club on Matthews Avenue. Alarms were raised at 6:01 am on Friday. The fire was caused by an electrical fault that had sparked in the kitchen area on the upper floor, causing the northern half of the building to burn. The building, prior to the blaze, was used as a residential dwelling.

A few months later in March 2021, the building was set on fire again, causing the entire building to set ablaze. Alarms were raised at around 2:30 pm. Police suspected that the blaze was 'deliberately lit'. The building was demolished upon the closing of the property.

== Demographics ==
Statistics New Zealand describes Kaitāia as a small urban area. It covers 8.48 km^{2} (3.27 sq mi) and had an estimated population of 6,170 as of June 2025, with a population density of 728 people per km^{2}.

Historical population
Year	Pop.	±% p.a.
2006	5,202	—
2013	4,887	−0.89%
2018	5,868	+3.73%
2023	5,955	+0.29%

Kaitāia had a population of 5,955 in the 2023 New Zealand census, an increase of 87 people (1.5%) since the 2018 census, and an increase of 1,068 people (21.9%) since the 2013 census. There were 2,871 males, 3,069 females and 18 people of other genders in 1,962 dwellings. 2.0% of people identified as LGBTIQ+. The median age was 33.0 years (compared with 38.1 years nationally). There were 1,506 people (25.3%) aged under 15 years, 1,239 (20.8%) aged 15 to 29, 2,250 (37.8%) aged 30 to 64, and 960 (16.1%) aged 65 or older.

People could identify as more than one ethnicity. The results were 48.2% European (Pākehā); 70.4% Māori; 9.3% Pasifika; 4.1% Asian; 0.4% Middle Eastern, Latin American and African New Zealanders (MELAA); and 1.4% other, which includes people giving their ethnicity as "New Zealander". English was spoken by 95.6%, Māori language by 22.1%, Samoan by 0.9% and other languages by 4.2%. No language could be spoken by 2.4% (e.g. too young to talk). New Zealand Sign Language was known by 0.7%. The percentage of people born overseas was 9.2, compared with 28.8% nationally.

Religious affiliations were 38.3% Christian, 0.7% Hindu, 0.1% Islam, 10.6% Māori religious beliefs, 0.3% Buddhist, 0.3% New Age, 0.1% Jewish, and 0.7% other religions. People who answered that they had no religion were 41.2%, and 8.6% of people did not answer the census question.

Of those at least 15 years old, 330 (7.4%) people had a bachelor's or higher degree, 2,478 (55.7%) had a post-high school certificate or diploma, and 1,566 (35.2%) people exclusively held high school qualifications. The median income was $28,500, compared with $41,500 nationally. 105 people (2.4%) earned over $100,000 compared to 12.1% nationally. The employment status of those at least 15 was that 1,746 (39.2%) people were employed full-time, 471 (10.6%) were part-time, and 372 (8.4%) were unemployed.

Individual statistical areas
Name	Area (km^{2})	Population	Density (per km^{2})	Dwellings	Median age	Median income
Kaitāia East	5.27	2,478	470	807	31.5 years	$28,800
Kaitāia West	3.20	3,477	1,087	1,155	34.0 years	$28,400
New Zealand					38.1 years	$41,500

== Climate ==
Kaitaia has a humid subtropical climate (Cfbl) according to the Trewartha climate classification system or an oceanic climate (Cfb) according to Köppen system. Summers are usually warm, while winters are usually wet and mild. Precipitation is heavy year round in the form of rain, which peaks during the months of May–September.

Climate data for Kaitaia (1991–2020 normals, extremes 1948–present)
Month	Jan	Feb	Mar	Apr	May	Jun	Jul	Aug	Sep	Oct	Nov	Dec	Year
Record high °C (°F)	31.2 (88.2)	31.0 (87.8)	29.1 (84.4)	29.6 (85.3)	24.2 (75.6)	21.6 (70.9)	21.0 (69.8)	21.5 (70.7)	23.0 (73.4)	24.5 (76.1)	26.4 (79.5)	28.3 (82.9)	31.2 (88.2)
Mean daily maximum °C (°F)	23.6 (74.5)	24.5 (76.1)	23.0 (73.4)	20.9 (69.6)	18.4 (65.1)	16.2 (61.2)	15.4 (59.7)	15.6 (60.1)	16.7 (62.1)	17.9 (64.2)	19.4 (66.9)	21.7 (71.1)	19.4 (66.9)
Daily mean °C (°F)	19.2 (66.6)	20.0 (68.0)	18.6 (65.5)	16.9 (62.4)	14.8 (58.6)	12.8 (55.0)	12.0 (53.6)	12.2 (54.0)	13.1 (55.6)	14.2 (57.6)	15.6 (60.1)	17.7 (63.9)	15.6 (60.1)
Mean daily minimum °C (°F)	14.8 (58.6)	15.6 (60.1)	14.3 (57.7)	12.9 (55.2)	11.2 (52.2)	9.4 (48.9)	8.5 (47.3)	8.8 (47.8)	9.6 (49.3)	10.6 (51.1)	11.7 (53.1)	13.8 (56.8)	11.8 (53.2)
Record low °C (°F)	7.0 (44.6)	7.3 (45.1)	6.2 (43.2)	3.8 (38.8)	0.3 (32.5)	−0.9 (30.4)	−1.2 (29.8)	0.3 (32.5)	−0.3 (31.5)	2.6 (36.7)	4.0 (39.2)	5.0 (41.0)	−1.2 (29.8)
Average rainfall mm (inches)	75.0 (2.95)	86.0 (3.39)	84.7 (3.33)	98.8 (3.89)	130.5 (5.14)	149.9 (5.90)	168.1 (6.62)	137.0 (5.39)	121.7 (4.79)	90.4 (3.56)	76.3 (3.00)	101.6 (4.00)	1,320 (51.96)
Average rainy days (≥ 1.0 mm)	6.1	6.5	7.6	10.1	13.2	14.7	15.9	15.5	12.8	10.4	9.2	9.9	131.9
Average relative humidity (%)	80.1	83.5	83.3	82.0	85.3	87.0	87.1	84.3	81.4	82.0	78.9	79.5	82.9
Mean monthly sunshine hours	233.8	199.6	200.0	163.9	146.5	127.4	139.5	161.3	169.7	194.7	193.7	202.2	2,132.3
Mean daily daylight hours	14.2	13.4	12.3	11.2	10.3	9.8	10.1	10.8	11.9	13.0	14.0	14.5	12.1
Percentage possible sunshine	53	53	52	49	46	43	45	48	48	48	46	45	48
Source 1: NIWA Climate Data
Source 2: Weather Spark

== Transport ==
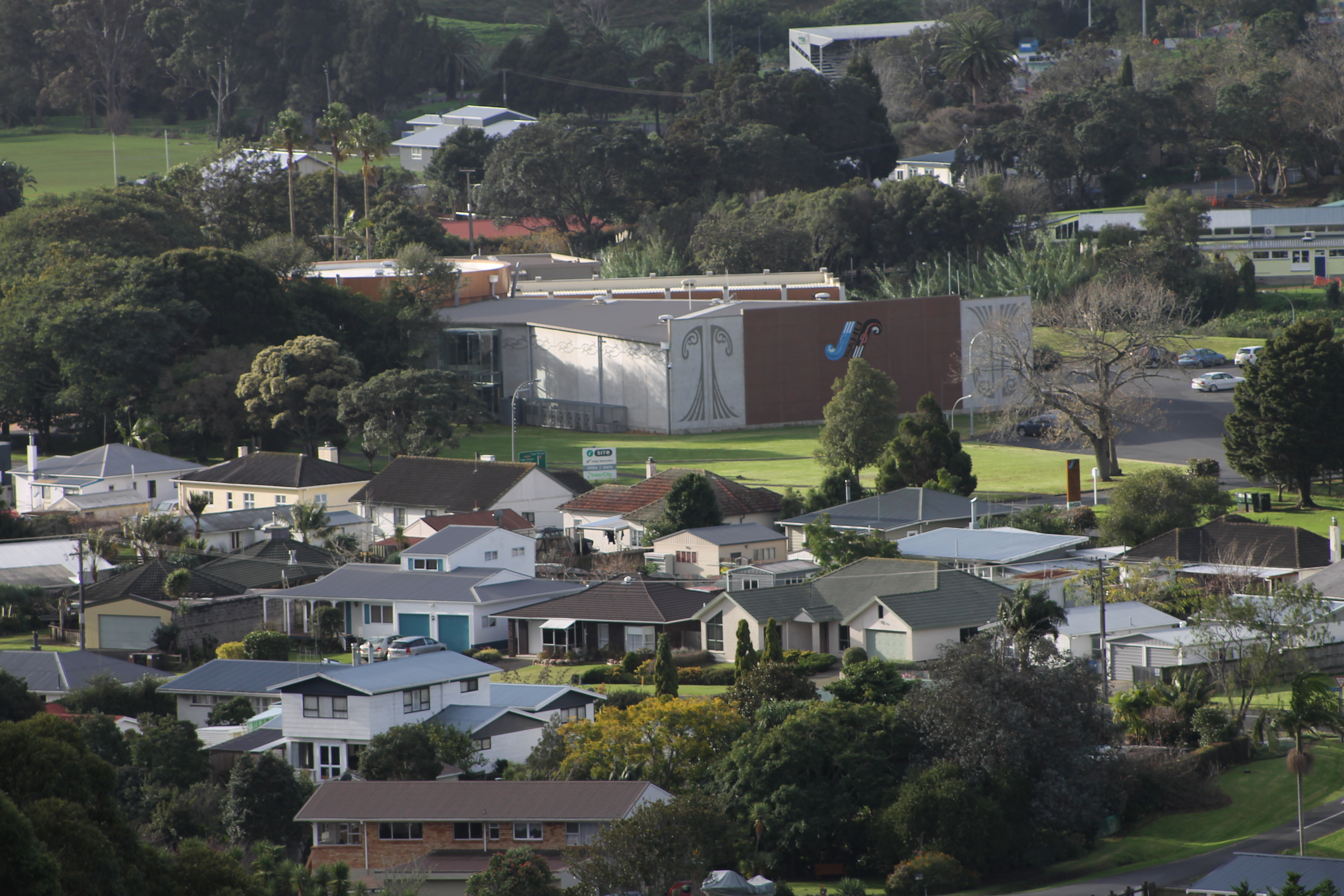
A photograph of the Te Ahu Centre, where the town library, information sites, and InterCity bus stops are.

InterCity operates a daily bus service to and from Auckland via Kerikeri. Community Business & Environment Centre (CBEC) runs a service called Busabout to Ahipara, Mangōnui and Pukenui.

Kaitaia Airport has services from Auckland and is the only airport in the upper Far North District. Air New Zealand discontinued their services in April 2015. Barrier Air has since taken over services to Auckland.

== Economy ==
=== Tourism ===
Kaitaia is one of the main centres in the Far North of New Zealand. It is near to popular tourist destinations such as Ahipara and is on State Highway 1 which leads up to Cape Reinga. The town's slogan is "Where journeys begin".

An annual Snapper Surf Casting Competition is held in March, on Te Oneroa-a-Tōhē (Ninety Mile Beach) Snapper Bonanza Surf Casting Competition.

=== Forestry ===
The Aupōuri Forest, to the North of Kaitaia, provides pine logs which are processed at the Juken Nissho Mill in Kaitaia.

Extraction of ancient swamp Kauri (Agathis australis), is a contentious industry.

=== Agriculture, horticulture and viticulture ===
Kaitaia lies within the Awanui River catchment. The area supports dairy and dry stock farming, predominantly sheep and beef. Further north of Kaitaia, the avocado industry flourishes, with orchards dispersed throughout the immediate area.

Wine is a growing commodity. One of the largest vineyards in the area is the Karikari Estate.

Mānuka honey is another industry experiencing growth.

== Education ==
Kaitaia Primary School, Kaitaia Intermediate and Kaitāia College are the main primary, intermediate and secondary schools. The rolls are 284, 218, and 732, respectively. Kaitaia Primary opened in 1875 on the site of the 1834 Anglican mission, which had run its own mission school. Kaitaia Intermediate separated from Kaitaia Primary in 1968. Kaitāia College started as the Secondary Department of Kaitaia School, establishing its own site in the 1930s and becoming a separate school in 1951.

Te Kura Kaupapa Māori o Pukemiro is a full primary (years 1–8) school with a roll of 150. It is a Kura Kaupapa Māori school which teaches fully in the Māori language.

Pompallier School is a Catholic full primary (years 1–8) school with a roll of 161.

Kaitaia Abundant Life School was a Christian composite school (years 1–13). It was established in 1988 as a private primary school, and extended to secondary students in 1992. It became a state integrated school in 1996. The school closed and exited the state system at the end of Term 2, 2023. The school's Trust believed that it was no longer possible to offer an education determined by their beliefs due to government and Ministry legislation, policy, and curriculum initiatives. These include: Gender neutral requirements, the Conversion Practices Prohibition Legislation Act 2022, and the curriculum's requirements around relationship and sexuality guidelines.

Oturu School is a primary school to the north east serving years 1–8, with a roll of 119.

All these schools are co-educational. Rolls are as of July 2026.

NorthTec polytechnic also has a campus in Kaitaia.

== Notable people ==
Notable people who have lived in Kaitaia:

- Nōpera Panakareao (?–1856) tribal leader, evangelist and assessor
- Margaret MacPherson née Kendall (1895–1974), journalist
- Sophia Taylor née Davis (1847–1930), hostess, suffragist and landowner in Mount Albert, Auckland
- Mike Burgoyne (rugby union), All Black – born in Kaitaia
- Peter Jones (New Zealand rugby union), All Black – born in Kaitaia
- Victor Yates (rugby), All Black – born in Kaitaia
- Shelley Kitchen, squash player, commonwealth and world championship medalist – born in Kaitaia
- Meighan Desmond, actress, noted for her work on Xena: Warrior Princess - born in Kaitāia
- Lance O'Sullivan (doctor) – worked in Kaitaia 2012?–2018
- Ricky Houghton, entrepreneur – worked in Kaitaia 2001–2022
