= Far North District Council =

Territorial authority of New Zealand

Coordinates: 35.409603°S 173.7314873°E

Far North District Council Te Kaunihera o Te Hiku o te Ika
- Coat of arms

- Brand logo

History
- Established: 1 November 1989; 37 years ago
- Preceded by: Bay of Islands County Council; Kaikohe Borough Council; Kaitaia Borough Council; Hokianga County Council; Mangonui County Council; Whangaroa County Council
- New session started: 19 October 2025

Leadership
- Mayor: Moko Tepania, Ind. since 19 October 2025
- Deputy: Chicky Rudkin, Ind. since 24 October 2025
- CEO: Guy Holroyd since 26 June 2023

Structure
- Seats: 11 (including mayor)
- Political groups: Independent (10); Your Voice Our Community (1); ACT Local (1)
- Length of term: 3 years

Elections
- Voting system: First-past-the-post
- First election: 14 October 1989
- Last election: 11 October 2025
- Next election: 14 October 2028

Meeting place
- Kaikohe Service Centre

Website
- fndc.govt.nz

Far North District Council (abbr. FNDC; Māori: Te Kaunihera o Te Hiku o te Ika) is the territorial authority for the Far North District of New Zealand. It serves as the district's local government alongside the Northland Regional Council as the regional council. The current entity has existed since 1989, prior to which local government in the area was split between six local authorities.

The governing body of the council has 11 councillors and is chaired by the mayor of the Far North (currently Moko Tepania since October 2022). There also three community boards.

== History ==
The council was formed in 1989, replacing the Bay of Islands County Council, Kaikohe Borough Council (1947–1989), Kaitaia Borough Council (1922–1989), Hokianga County Council, Mangonui County Council and Whangaroa County Council (1876–1989).

In 2020, the council had 384 staff, including 55 earning more than $100,000. According to the right-wing Taxpayers' Union think tank, residential rates averaged $2,428.

== Governing body ==
=== Mayor ===
One mayor is elected at-large; they chair meetings of the governing body and act as the head of local government in the district.

=== Current council ===
The current members of the governing body of council are:

Far North District Council, 2025–2028
Role	Portrait	Name	Affiliation	Ward
Mayor		Moko Tepania	Independent	Elected at-large
Deputy mayor		Chicky Rudkin	Independent	Ngā Tai o Tokerau
Councillor		Arohanui Allen	Independent	Ngā Tai o Tokerau
Councillor		Hilda Halkyard-Harawira	Independent	Ngā Tai o Tokerau
Councillor		Tāmati Rākena	Independent	Ngā Tai o Tokerau
Councillor		Ann Court	Your Voice Our Community	Bay of Islands-Whangaroa
Councillor		Davina Smolders	ACT Local	Bay of Islands-Whangaroa
Councillor		Kelly Stratford	Independent	Bay of Islands-Whangaroa
Councillor		Rachel Baucke	Independent	Te Hiku
Councillor		Felicity Foy	Independent	Te Hiku
Councillor		John Vujcich	Independent	Kaikohe-Hokianga

== Community boards ==
The Far North District currently has 3 community boards, Bay of Islands-Whangaroa, Kaikohe-Hokianga and Te Hiku. Geographically they cover the entire district and are synonymous with the general ward boundaries.

=== Bay of Islands-Whangaroa ===
The Bay of Islands-Whangaroa Community Board has seven members representing six subdivisions: Kawakawa-Moerewa (1 member), Kerikeri (2 members), Paihia (1 member), Russell-Ōpua (1 member), Waipapa (1 member), and Whangaroa (1 member).

=== Kaikohe-Hokianga ===
The Kaikohe-Hokianga Community Board has 6 members representing 3 subdivisions: Kaikohe (3 members), North Hokianga (1 member), and South Hokianga (2 members).

=== Te Hiku ===
The Te Hiku Community Board has 6 members representing 4 subdivisions: Doubtless Bay (1 member), Kaitāia (3 members), North Cape (1 member), and Whatuwhiwhi (1 member).

== Elections ==
=== List ===
==== Mayoral ====
- 1989
- 1992
- 1995
- 1998
- 2001
- 2004
- 2007
- 2010
- 2013
- 2016
- 2019
- 2022
- 2025

==== Council ====
- 1989
- 1992
- 1995
- 1998
- 2001
- 2004
- 2007
- 2010
- 2013
- 2016
- (2018)
- 2019
- 2022
- 2025
