= Moko Tepania =

New Zealand educator and mayor

His Worship Moko Tepania
- Tepania in 2026

6th Mayor of the Far North
- Incumbent
- Assumed office 2022
- Preceded by: John Carter

Personal details
- Occupation: Teacher, councillor

Daryl "Moko" Tepania (born 1991) is a New Zealand politician who has served as Mayor of the Far North since 2022. He is the first Māori person to have served as the Mayor of the Far North.

== Early life and teaching career ==
Tepania is Maori, with ties to Te Rarawa and Ngāti Kahu ki Whangaroa. He was named Daryl after his father Daryl Sr but was better known by his Māori nickname Moko. He grew up in Hikurangi with his parents and younger siblings.

He grew up in the Northland Region and attended St Francis Xavier School in Whangārei during his primary school years. For secondary school, Tepania attended Pompallier Catholic College, where he also learnt the Māori language. Tepania later studied secondary school teaching and the Māori language at the University of Waikato, graduating with a conjoint Bachelor of Teaching and Bachelor of Arts in 2014. Tepania subsequently taught the Māori language at his former high school before becoming a secondary teacher at the Māori immersion school Te Kura Kaupapa Māori o Kaikohe in Kaikohe.

== Local government career ==
=== District councillor, 2019–2022 ===
During the 2019 New Zealand local elections, Tepania was elected as a councillor in the Far North District Council (FNDC). During his first term, Tepania became the first FNDC councillor to submit a council report in Māori and spoke the language during a council meeting to mark Māori Language Week. In mid-July 2022, Tepania announced his intention to run for the position of Mayor of the Far North at the 2022 New Zealand local elections. He ran on a platform of championing the Far North District, community engagement and teamwork.

=== First mayoral term, 2022–2025 ===
During the 2022 local elections held on 8 October, Tepania succeeded the outgoing incumbent Mayor John Carter. He won 7,805 votes, defeating the former Deputy Mayor Ann Court by a margin of 442 votes based on final results. Tepania became the first Māori individual to be elected as Mayor of the Far North. During the 2022 Far North District Council election, he also contested the new Ngā Tai o Tokerau Māori ward.

When Cyclone Gabrielle struck the North Island in February 2023, Tepania used social media to communicate with constituents about the FNDC's disaster preparation efforts. In late May 2023, the FNDC's chief executive resigned following conflict with Tepania. In June 2023, Tepania was shortlisted for the 2023 One Young World Politician of the Year Award due to his support for the Make It 16 campaign to lower the voting age and his efforts to boost youth employment and educational oportunities through his position on the Mayors Taskforce For Jobs's national committee. On 6 October 2023, he became one of five recipients of One Young World Politician of the Year award ceremony in Belfast.

During his first mayoral term, the Far North District Council implemented a Māori language and tikanga policy, updated the FNDC's logo, and restored its Māori name Te Kanuhihera o Te Hiku o te Ika. Other policies included incorporating the Māori lunar calendar into the FNDC's governance schedule (shifting from six weeks to four weeks meetings), establishing new transport committee in July 2023 to deal with roading issues, establishing a tikanga-based te kuaka/te ao Māori liaison committee in October 2023, and exploring an iwi (tribal) participation agreement with Ngāpuhi's Rūnanga's (tribal council) Te Runanga-Ā-Iwi-O-Ngāpuhi.

In March 2025, a New Zealand Taxpayers' Union-Curia poll ranked Tepania as New Zealand's most popular Mayor out of 51 polled councils. The poll awarded him a 39% approval rating, with a margin of error of 4.7%. The poll results were based on 24,000 monthly responses across a randomly selected pool of 1,000 people surveyed between January and November 2023 and February 2024 and February 2025. Only cities and districts with 100 or more accumulated responses during that period were reported in polling results.

=== Second term, 2025–present ===
After consulting with whanau (family), Tepania ran for a second term as Mayor of the Far North. During the 2025 Far North District Council election, he retaining the Mayoralty with 10,502 votes based on preliminary results, defeating his competitor Ann Court by a margin of 3,600 votes. In addition, the FNDC voted to retain its Māori ward by a majority of 52.9% (10,980) during the 2025 New Zealand local referendums on Māori wards and constituencies. As Mayor, Tepania had advocated retaining Māori wards and constituencies. On 31 October 2025, Tepania confirmed that he would not be running for a third term as Mayor at the 2028 New Zealand local elections.

In February 2026, ACT Local councillor Davina Smolders incorrectly claimed on her Facebook page that Tepania had become the Labour Party's Northland candidate for the 2026 New Zealand general election. Far North District Council (FNDC) group manager for community and engagement Ruben Garcia described the post as false and said that Smolders would be subject to disciplinary action. Tepania subsequently confirmed that he would be serving the rest of his term as Mayor and ruled out running as a Labour candidate at the 2026 election.

During his second State of the Far North address on 1 March 2026, Tepania confirmed that the FNDC would use NZ$5 million from its commercial arm Far North Holdings to help keep rates increases in the Far North District down to 4.5% for the 2026/27 financial year. In addition, Tepania called for the central Government to tighten dog control legislation in response to a spate of dog attacks in the Far North district. He also confirmed that the FNDC intended to spend $151 million in capital work including a major roading programme for the 2026/27 financial year.

In mid-April 2026, the FNDC under Tepania's leadership proceeded with plans to establish a contentious Māori liaison committee despite opposition from Councillor Smolder and broadcast Duncan Garner, who contended that the council's appointment of unelected members to its committees was illegal and "undemocratic." After Smolders discussed the matter on Garner's "Editor in Chief" podcast, Tepania declined an invitation to appear on Garner's show and swore at him. He also took issue with what he considered as Smolder's "false, misleading, and unfounded" statements on Garner's show. Tepania subsequently apologised to Garner for his hostile remarks.

In May 2026, Tepania submitted a proposal on behalf of the FNDC calling for local councils to have the final say in place naming decisions. Under the present system, the central government has the power to veto place name change proposals by local councils. Tepania submitted the proposal in response to cabinet minister Chris Penk's decision to veto a proposal by the New Zealand Geographic Board to rename Russell to Kororāreka or give both names equal standing. While Tepania's proposal was supported by the Northland Regional Council, Porirua City Council, Kāpiti and Rangitīkei District Councils, Councillor Smolders disagreed with the proposal, contending that devolving place naming decisions to local authorities would open the risks of "political influence, inconsistency between regions, and community division from identity-based naming debates."

== Views and positions ==
While serving as Mayor of the Far North, Tepania expressed concern about the environmental impact of the Sixth Labour Government's Three Waters reform programme in April 2023.

Tepania has also opposed the ACT Party's proposed Treaty Principles Bill and took part in the 42,000 strong Hīkoi mō te Tiriti (March for the Treaty) in November 2024.

== Personal life ==
Tepania's father Daryl is from Ngāti Kahu ki Whangaroa while his mother Aroha is from Te Rarawa. He has a younger sister and a younger brother. Tepania also had a younger brother who died when he was six months old. Tepania also has two grandparents named Damien and Wero Kāmira, the latter whom he credited with encouraging him to study the Māori language. As of February 2023, Tepania was single. Raised in a Māori Catholic family, Tepania has said that he worshipped both the Christian God and the Māori sky father Ranginui.

During his first term as Mayor of the Far North, Tepania also completed a Master of Education with First Class Honours in Māori Medium Education at the University of Waikato in April 2024. His MA thesis explored the potential benefits of learning the Māori language using the Māori lunar calendar.

In October 2026, Tepania narrated the Northland tour of the music The Rocky Horror Picture Show.
