= Mayor of the Far North =

Heads of a municipal government in New Zealand

- Te Kahika o Te Hiku o te Ika
- Coat of arms of the Far North District

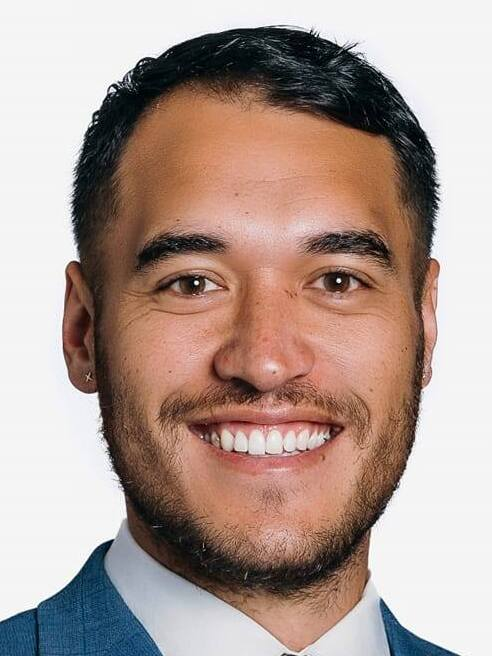
- Incumbent; Moko Tepania since 2022
- Style: His/Her Worship
- Seat: Kaikohe
- Term length: 3 years, renewable
- Formation: 1989
- First holder: Millie Srhoj
- Deputy: Chicky Rudkin
- Salary: $162,879
- Website: Official website

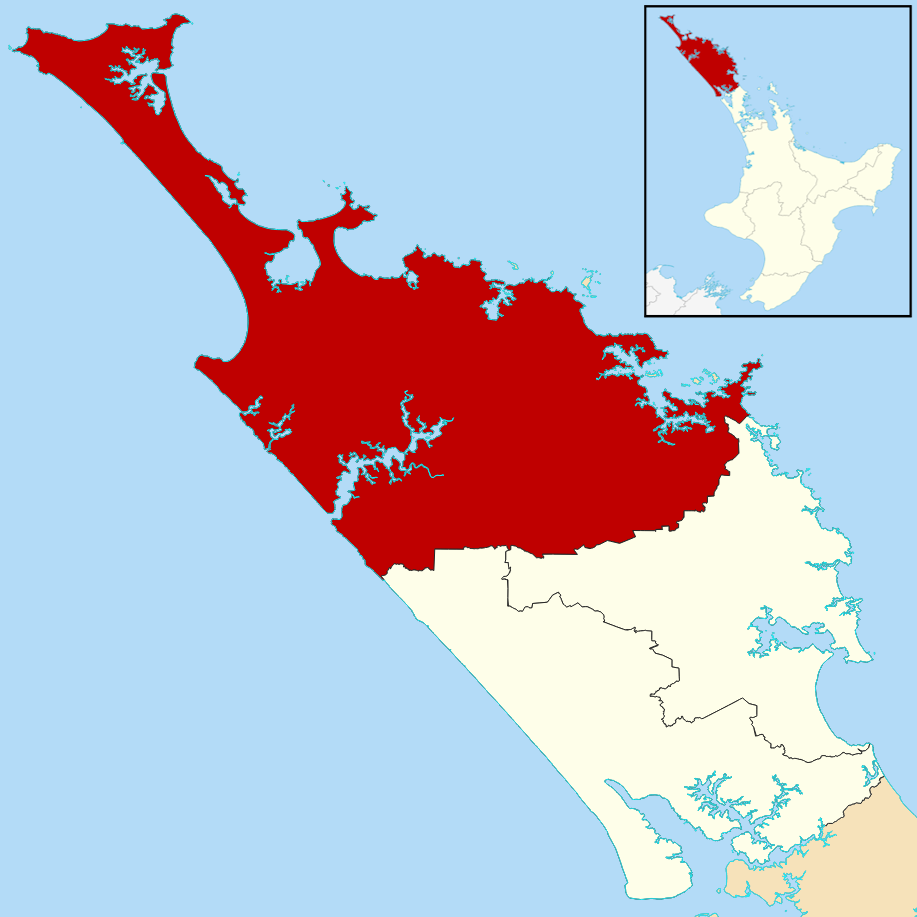
Map of the Far North District within Northland

The mayor of the Far North is the elected head of local government in the Far North District of New Zealand's North Island; one of 67 mayors in the country. The largest town in the district is Kerikeri and the council is based in Kaikohe. The mayor presides over the Far North District Council and is directly elected using the single transferable vote method.

The current mayor is Moko Tepania, first elected in October 2022 during that year's local elections. He is a member of the Te Rarawa and Ngāti Kahu ki Whangaroa Māori iwi.

== Method of election ==
In August 2020, Far North District councillors unanimously voted to use the single transferable vote (STV) system in future elections. Then mayor John Carter abstained from voting on the issue. A non-binding survey of local residents on the issue received 637 submissions, resulting in 231-to-406 in favour of adopting STV. The council previously used a first-past-the-post system. This change of electoral system will be reconsidered following the 2025 local elections.

== List of office holders ==
=== Mayors ===
	Name	Portrait	Term
1	Millie Srhoj		1989–1992
2	Sue James		1992–1998
3	Yvonne Sharp		1998–2007
4	Wayne Brown		2007–2013
5	John Carter		2013–2022
6	Moko Tepania		2022–present

=== Deputy mayors ===
	Name	Portrait	Term	Mayor
1	Dover Samuels		1989–1992	Srhoj
2	?		1992–1998	James
3	John Klaricich		1998–2004	Sharp
4	Laurie Byers		2004–2007	Sharp
5	Sally Macauley		2007–2010	Brown
6	Ann Court		2010–2013	Brown
7	Tania McInnes		2013–2019	Carter
(6)	Ann Court		2019–2022	Carter
8	Kelly Stratford		2022–2025	Tepania
9	Chicky Rudkin		2025–present	Tepania
