= Far North District =

Coordinates: 35.225°S 173.505°E

Far North District Te Hiku o te Ika
- Territorial authority district
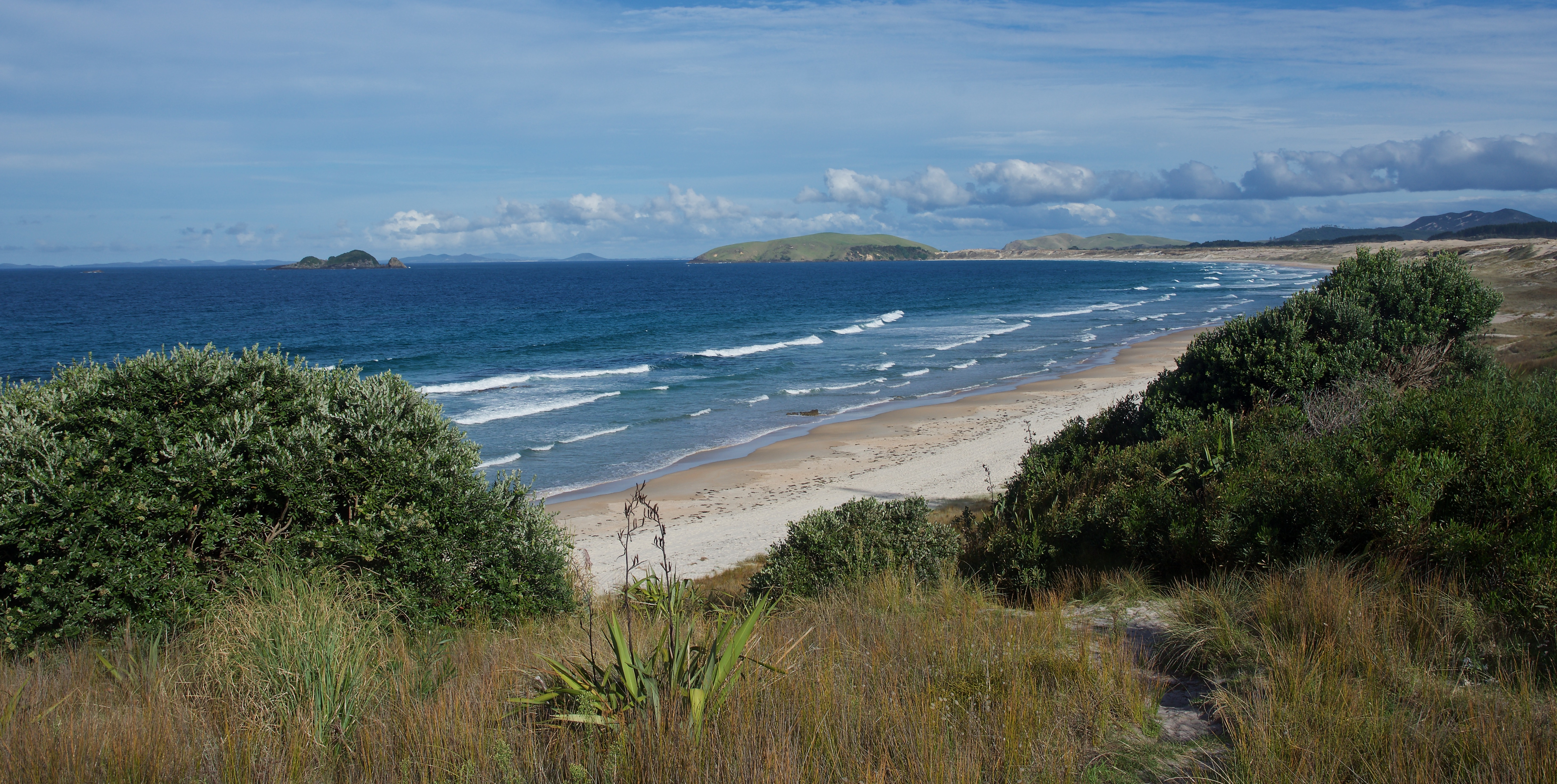

- Far North district within the North Island
- Country: New Zealand
- Region: Northland Region
- Wards: Te Hiku; Bay of Islands-Whangaroa; Bay of Islands-Whangaroa; Ngā Tai o Tokerau (Māori)
- Seat: Kaikohe

Government
  - Mayor: Moko Tepania
  - Territorial authority: Far North District Council

Area
  - Total: 7,323.86 km^{2} (2,827.76 sq mi)
  - Land: 6,686.61 km^{2} (2,581.71 sq mi)

Population (June 2025)
  - Total: 73,700
  - Density: 11.0/km^{2} (28.5/sq mi)
- Time zone: UTC+12 (NZST)
  - Summer (DST): UTC+13 (NZDT)
- Postcode(s): Map of postcodes
- Area code: 09
- Website: FNDC.govt.nz

The Far North District is the northernmost territorial authority district of New Zealand, consisting of the northern part of the Northland Peninsula in the North Island. It stretches from North Cape / Otou and Cape Reinga / Te Rerenga Wairua in the north, down to the Bay of Islands, the Hokianga and the town of Kaikohe.

The Far North District Council is based in Kaikohe, and has ten ward councillors representing four wards: Te Hiku (in the north), Kaikohe-Hokianga (in the west), Bay of Islands-Whangaroa (in the east) and the district-wide Ngā Tai o Tokerau Māori ward. The council is led by the current mayor of the Far North, Moko Tepania, who entered the role in 2022.

== Geography ==
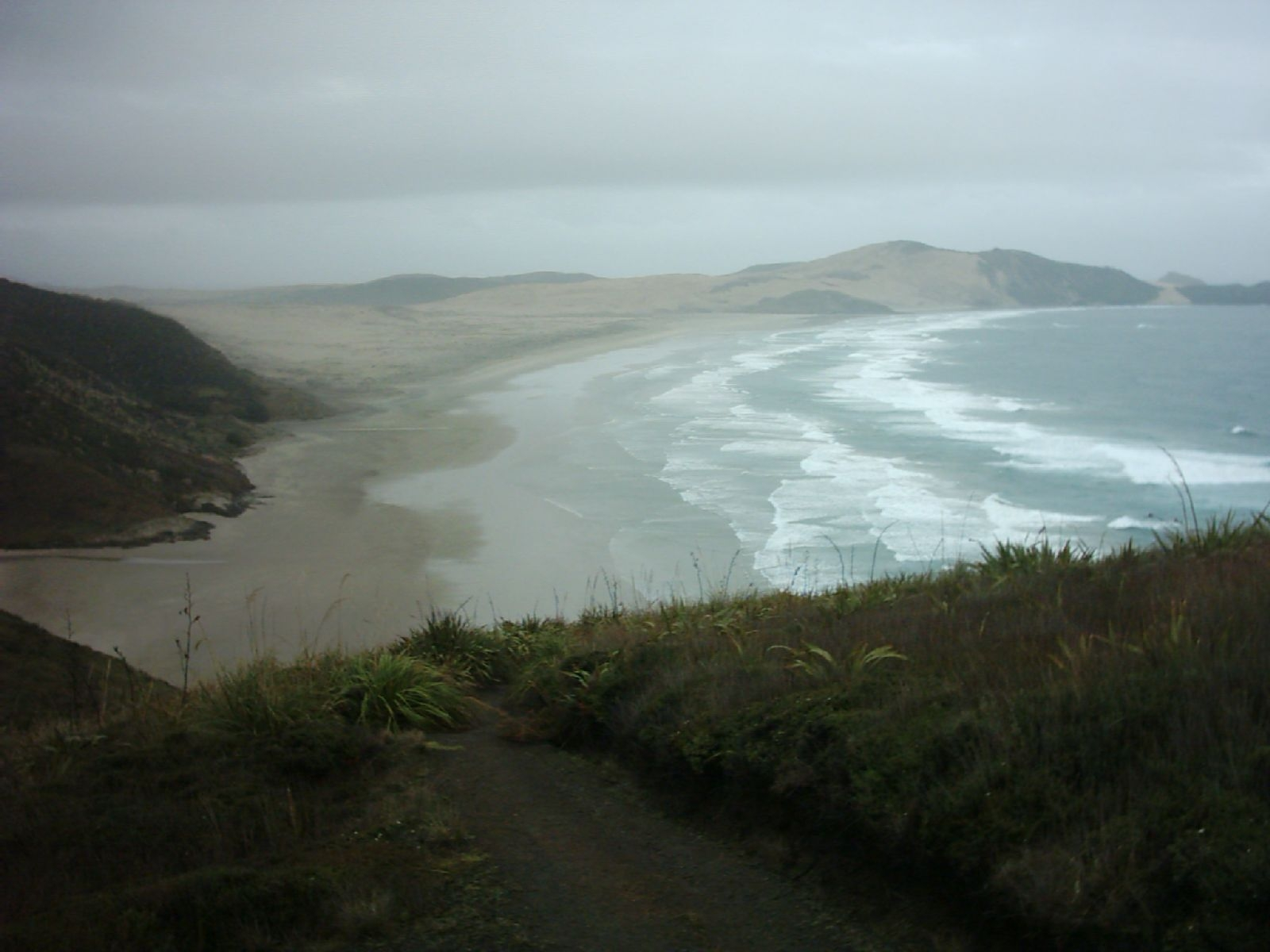
The Far North, while generally a pleasant climate, can also be affected by the sometimes stormy maritime weather of the country, especially at places like Cape Reinga.

The Far North District is the largest of three territorial authorities making up the Northland Region. The district stretches from the capes and bays at the northern tip of the Aupōuri Peninsula past Te Oneroa-a-Tōhe / Ninety Mile Beach to the main body of the Northland Peninsula, where it encompasses the Parengarenga Harbour, Whangaroa Harbour and Bay of Islands (on the east coast) and Hokianga (on the west coast).

It borders on the Kaipara and Whangarei Districts, which are the other two territorial authorities in the Northland Region.

== Population ==
Far North District covers 6,686.61 km^{2} (2,581.71 sq mi) and had an estimated population of 73,700 as of June 2025, with a population density of 11.0 people per km^{2}.

Historical population
Year	Pop.	±% p.a.
2006	55,845	—
2013	55,734	−0.03%
2018	65,250	+3.20%
2023	71,430	+1.83%

Far North District had a population of 71,430 in the 2023 New Zealand census, an increase of 6,180 people (9.5%) since the 2018 census, and an increase of 15,696 people (28.2%) since the 2013 census. There were 35,529 males, 35,709 females and 192 people of other genders in 26,049 dwellings. 2.1% of people identified as LGBTIQ+. The median age was 44.3 years (compared with 38.1 years nationally). There were 14,193 people (19.9%) aged under 15 years, 10,914 (15.3%) aged 15 to 29, 30,588 (42.8%) aged 30 to 64, and 15,735 (22.0%) aged 65 or older.

People could identify as more than one ethnicity. The results were 64.6% European (Pākehā); 49.9% Māori; 5.4% Pasifika; 3.2% Asian; 0.6% Middle Eastern, Latin American and African New Zealanders (MELAA); and 2.0% other, which includes people giving their ethnicity as "New Zealander". English was spoken by 96.8%, Māori language by 15.6%, Samoan by 0.4% and other languages by 6.0%. No language could be spoken by 1.9% (e.g. too young to talk). New Zealand Sign Language was known by 0.6%. The percentage of people born overseas was 15.3, compared with 28.8% nationally.

Religious affiliations were 32.4% Christian, 0.5% Hindu, 0.2% Islam, 5.9% Māori religious beliefs, 0.4% Buddhist, 0.5% New Age, 0.1% Jewish, and 1.1% other religions. People who answered that they had no religion were 51.4%, and 7.9% of people did not answer the census question.

Of those at least 15 years old, 6,780 (11.8%) people had a bachelor's or higher degree, 31,995 (55.9%) had a post-high school certificate or diploma, and 16,353 (28.6%) people exclusively held high school qualifications. The median income was $29,700, compared with $41,500 nationally. 3,126 people (5.5%) earned over $100,000 compared to 12.1% nationally. The employment status of those at least 15 was that 22,947 (40.1%) people were employed full-time, 7,950 (13.9%) were part-time, and 2,670 (4.7%) were unemployed.

Individual wards
Name	Area (km^{2})	Population	Density (per km^{2})	Dwellings	Median age	Median income
Te Hiku General Ward	2,326.32	22,740	9.8	8,358	42.6 years	$28,600
Bay of Islands-Whangaroa General Ward	2,088.23	33,045	15.8	12,537	47.2 years	$33,200
Kaikohe-Hokianga General Ward	2,272.06	15,645	6.9	5,154	39.1 years	$26,600
New Zealand					38.1 years	$41,500

=== Urban areas and settlements ===
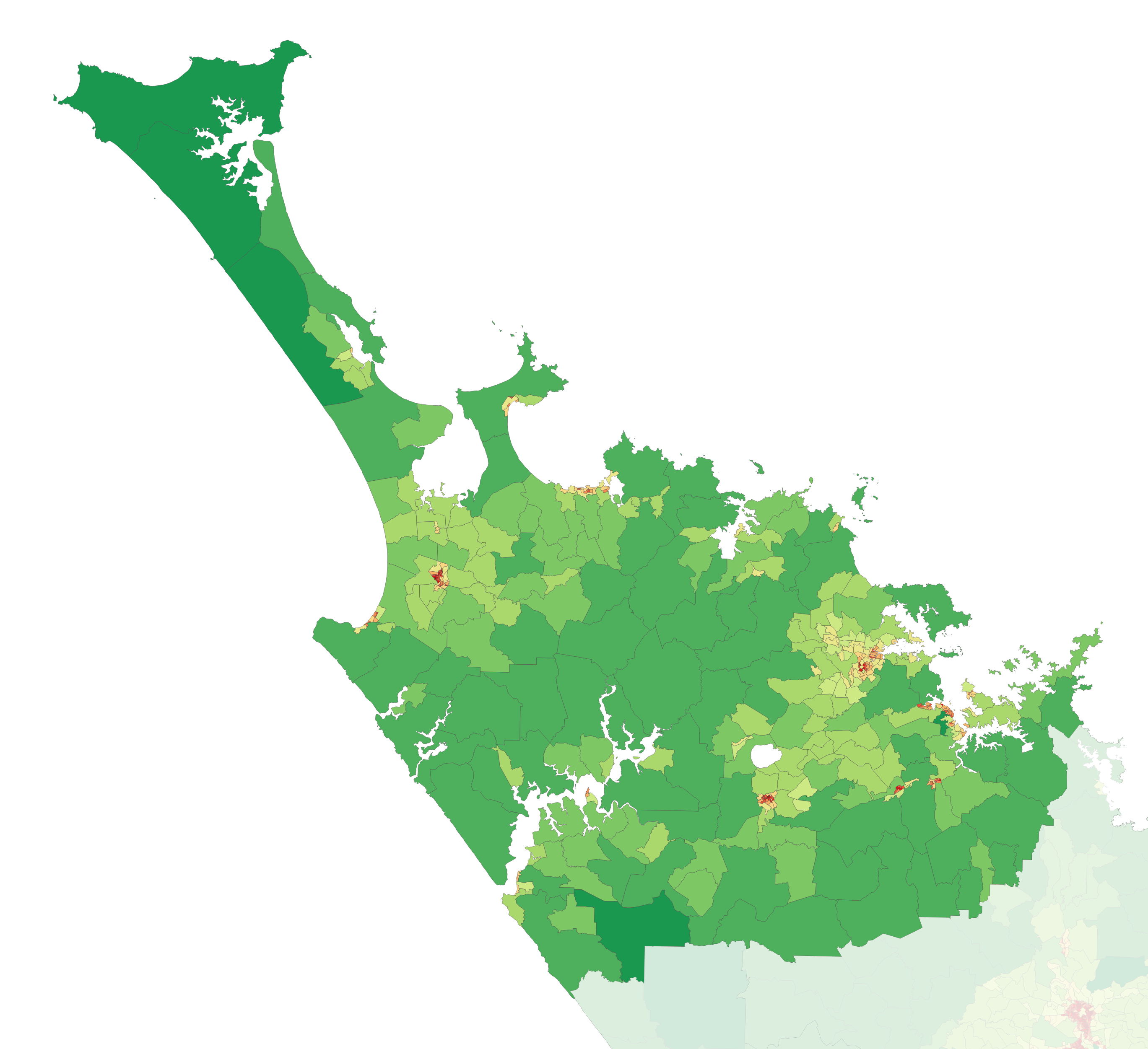
Population density in the 2023 census

The Far North District has eight towns with a population over 1,000. Together they are home to 36.4% of the district's population.

Urban area	Population (June 2025)	% of district
Kerikeri	8,380	11.4%
Kaitaia	6,170	8.4%
Kaikohe	4,720	6.4%
Moerewa	1,930	2.6%
Paihia	1,640	2.2%
Kawakawa	1,500	2.0%
Opua	1,250	1.7%
Haruru	1,210	1.6%

The northernmost town in the district is Kaitaia. Kerikeri, Moerewa, Kawakawa, Paihia, Opua and Russell are clustered on the east coast around the Bay of Islands with Kaikohe centrally situated to their west. Another cluster of small settlements, Ōmāpere, Opononi, Rawene, Panguru, Kohukohu, and Horeke, surrounds the Hokianga Harbour on the west coast.
