= Paul-Antoine Léonard de Villefeix =

Dominican priest (1728–1780)

Paul-Antoine Léonard de Villefeix OP (born 1728 – 1780) was a French Dominican priest. He conducted the first Christian service in New Zealand. He was the chaplain of French navigator and explorer Jean-François-Marie de Surville when de Surville, in his ship, the Saint Jean Baptiste, sighted the North Island of New Zealand in 1769. De Surville remained two weeks in Doubtless Bay, near Whatuwhiwhi, where Villefeix celebrated the first Mass in New Zealand waters on Christmas Day 1769.

== Early life ==
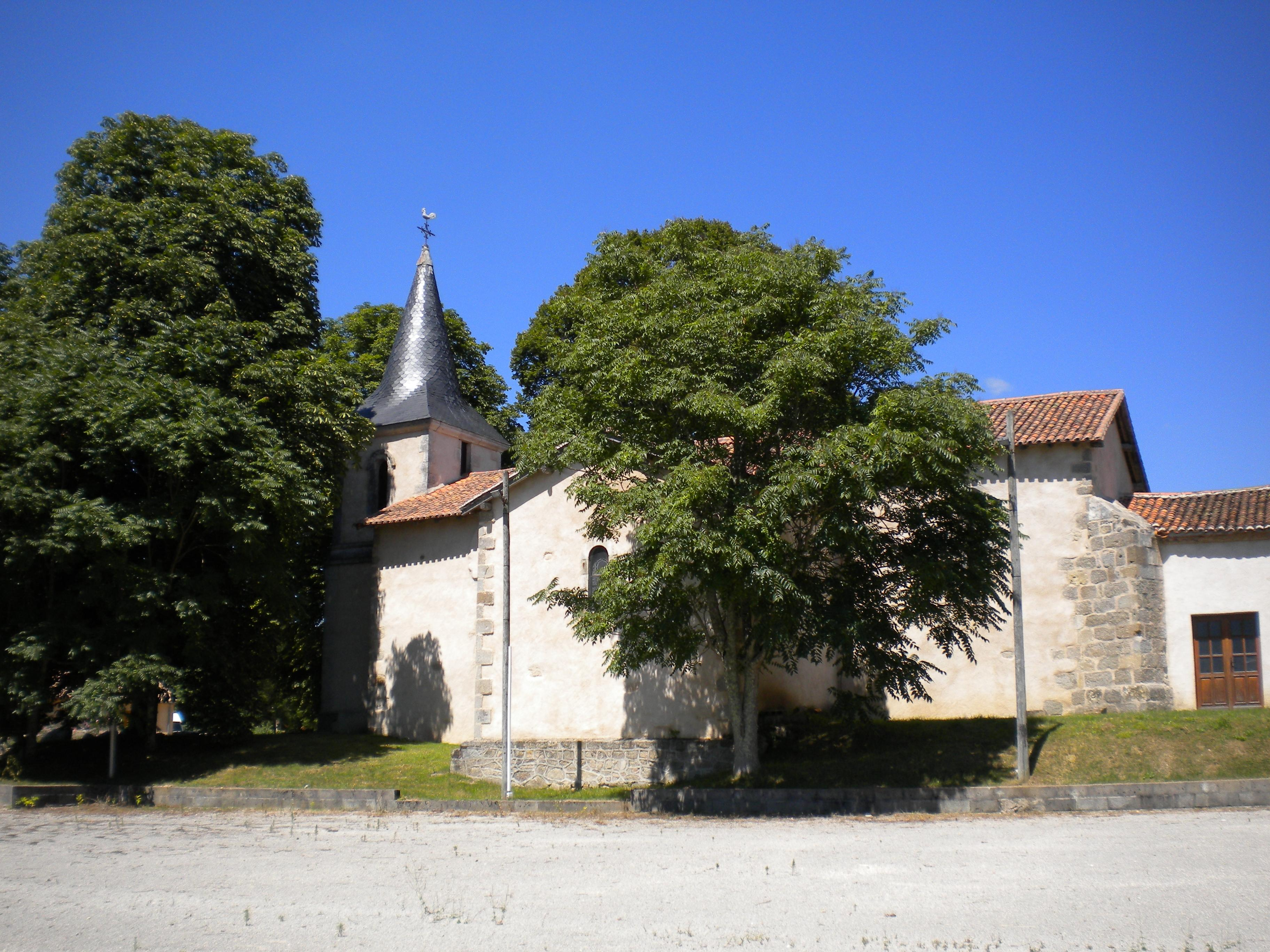
Parish church of Étouars

Villefeix was born near Étouars in Perigord. One of his brothers, Léonard de Lestang, was also a priest, himself becoming parish priest of Étouars.

== Chaplain ==
Villefeix was invited by the Surville family to be the chaplain for an expedition to the South Pacific on the ship Saint Jean Baptiste led by navigator and explorer Jean-François-Marie de Surville. In December 1769, the ship arrived in Doubtless Bay and a landing was made at Rangiaohia on the Karikari Peninsula where Father Villefeix went ashore, unaccompanied by fellow crew members, and wandered through one of the villages. He presided over eight burials in Doubtless Bay. Nearly half of Surville's crew members died on the voyage. Unlike Captain James Cook, he was not able to combat scurvy.

== First Mass in New Zealand ==
Villefeix was the first Christian minister to set foot on New Zealand, pre-dating Samuel Marsden by forty-four years; and he was the first ordained minister to lead a Christian service in New Zealand waters. As a priest, he was required to say Mass on Sundays and holy days of obligation (of which Christmas Day 1769, when Saint John Baptiste was still in Doubtless Bay, was one). Villefeix is also recorded as leading prayers for the sick on Christmas Eve and for burials in Doubtless Bay.

== South America ==
In April 1770, the Surville expedition reached Peru and Captain Surville drowned while trying to land through surf on a beach. Seventeen months later, in 1771, while the Saint Jean-Baptiste was being held by Spanish authorities in Callao, Surville's nephew and Villefeix left the ship to go goldmining up a river.

== Parish priest ==
Villefeix returned to France and he too became parish priest at his home town, Étouars, where he died in 1780, aged 52.
