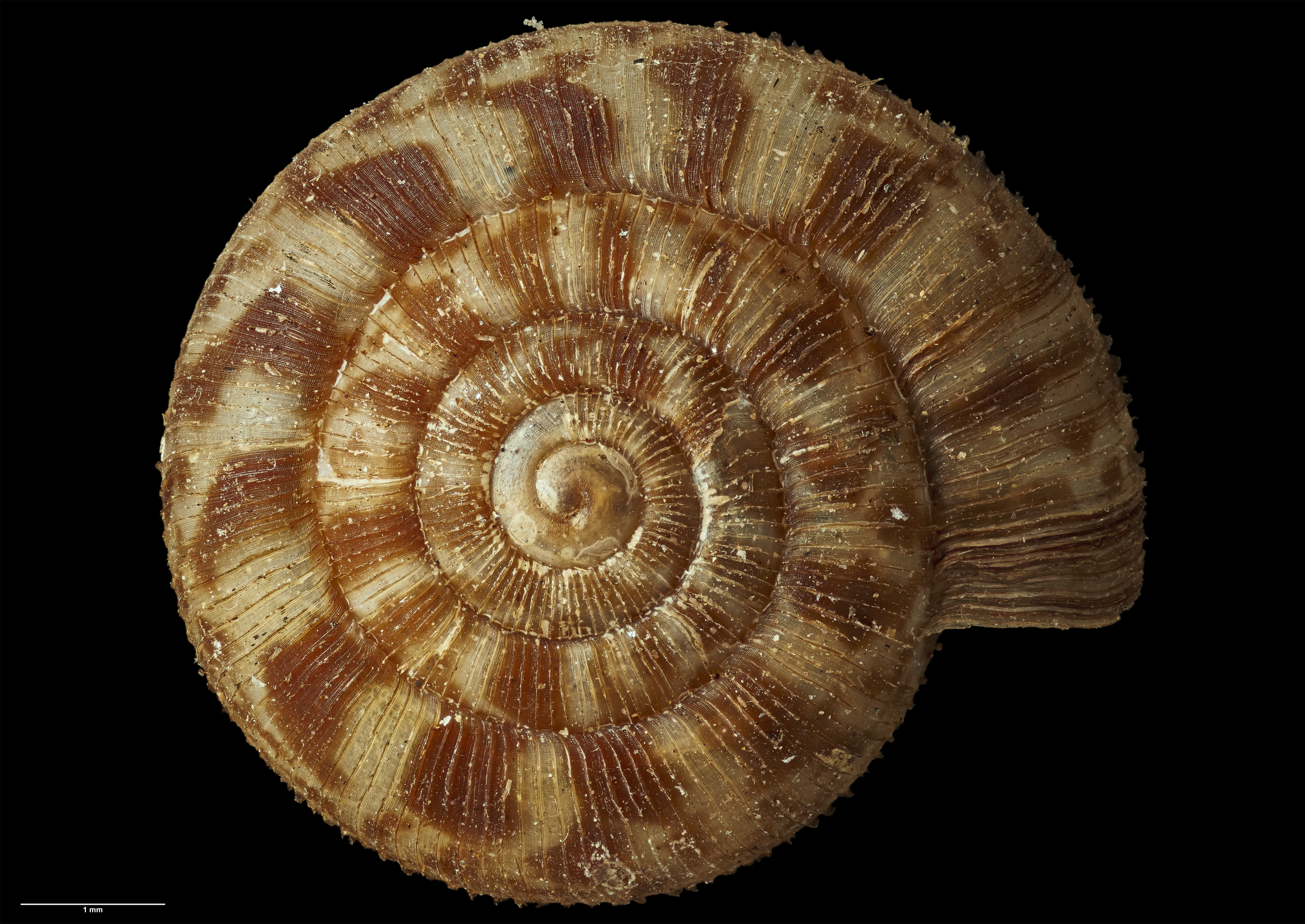
- Holotype from the Auckland War Memorial Museum

Conservation status
- Relict (NZ TCS)

Scientific classification
- Kingdom: Animalia
- Phylum: Mollusca
- Class: Gastropoda
- Order: Stylommatophora
- Family: Charopidae
- Subfamily: Charopinae
- Genus: Allodiscus
- Species: A. spiritus

Binomial name
- Allodiscus spiritus A. W. B. Powell, 1952

= Allodiscus spiritus =

Species of land snail

Allodiscus spiritus is a species of land snail belonging to the family Charopidae. It is endemic to New Zealand, found on the Aupōuri Peninsula, Northland, typically in leaf litter of broadleaf trees and kānuka.

== Description ==
In the original description, Powell described the species as follows:

Shell almost as large as dimorphus, a similar but darker and more clear-cut tessellated pattern, more than twice as many radials, 100-104 on the penultimate and dense distinct spiral threads over all whorls, forming a regular interstitial reticulation with the secondary radials, which number 8 to 10 for each interspace. Whorls 5 1/4, including a depressed protoconch of 1 3/4 whorls, sculptured as in fallax but with the spirals more distinct. The adult whorls are more rounded and not so deep as in dimorphus. Imperforate....Dentition: 32 + 1 + 32. Radula similar to that of dimorphus, central tooth with the base longer than broad, narrower in front and with a single prominent, long cusp with a minute denticle on either side. Laterals similar to the central tooth but with a distinct denticle on the outer side only. Marginals at first longer than broad but broader than long towards the extremities, with bidentate cusps and 3 to 6 denticles on the outer side.

The holotype of the species measures 4.5 mm (0.18 in) in height and 7.0 mm (0.28 in) in diameter, with some individuals reaching a diameter of up to 8.25 mm (0.325 in). The protoconch has 1.15-1.25 convex whorls, and is translucent yellowish to reddish brown. The teleoconch has up to 3.3 broadly convex whorls, and is translucent with a pale buff or white, with irregular red-brown marks. Juveniles have narrowly umbilicate shells, while adults are anomphalous. A. spiritus can be distinguished from most other members of Allodiscus due to having 100-104 primary radials on the penultimate.

While Powell suggested that A. spiritus can be distinguished visually from A. dimorphus, both species have varying colours and colour patterns, and can only be conclusively distinguished due to geographic location and genetic differences.

== Taxonomy ==
The species was first described by A. W. B. Powell in 1952. The holotype was collected from Waterfall Gully near Piwhane / Spirits Bay on the northern coast of the Aupōuri Peninsula, Northland, New Zealand on 29 January 1950, and is held by the Auckland War Memorial Museum.

Powell suggests that A. spiritus may have developed as a distinct species when the North Cape area was an island separated from New Zealand, which occurred during the Pliocene.

== Distribution and habitat ==
The species is endemic to New Zealand, found on the Aupōuri Peninsula, Northland. The species is found in ground litter of broadleaf trees or kānuka and broadleaf shrublands and forests, up to an elevation of 310 m (1,020 ft) above sea-level. The holotype was found in association with Astelia plants, under decaying leaves.

== Gallery ==
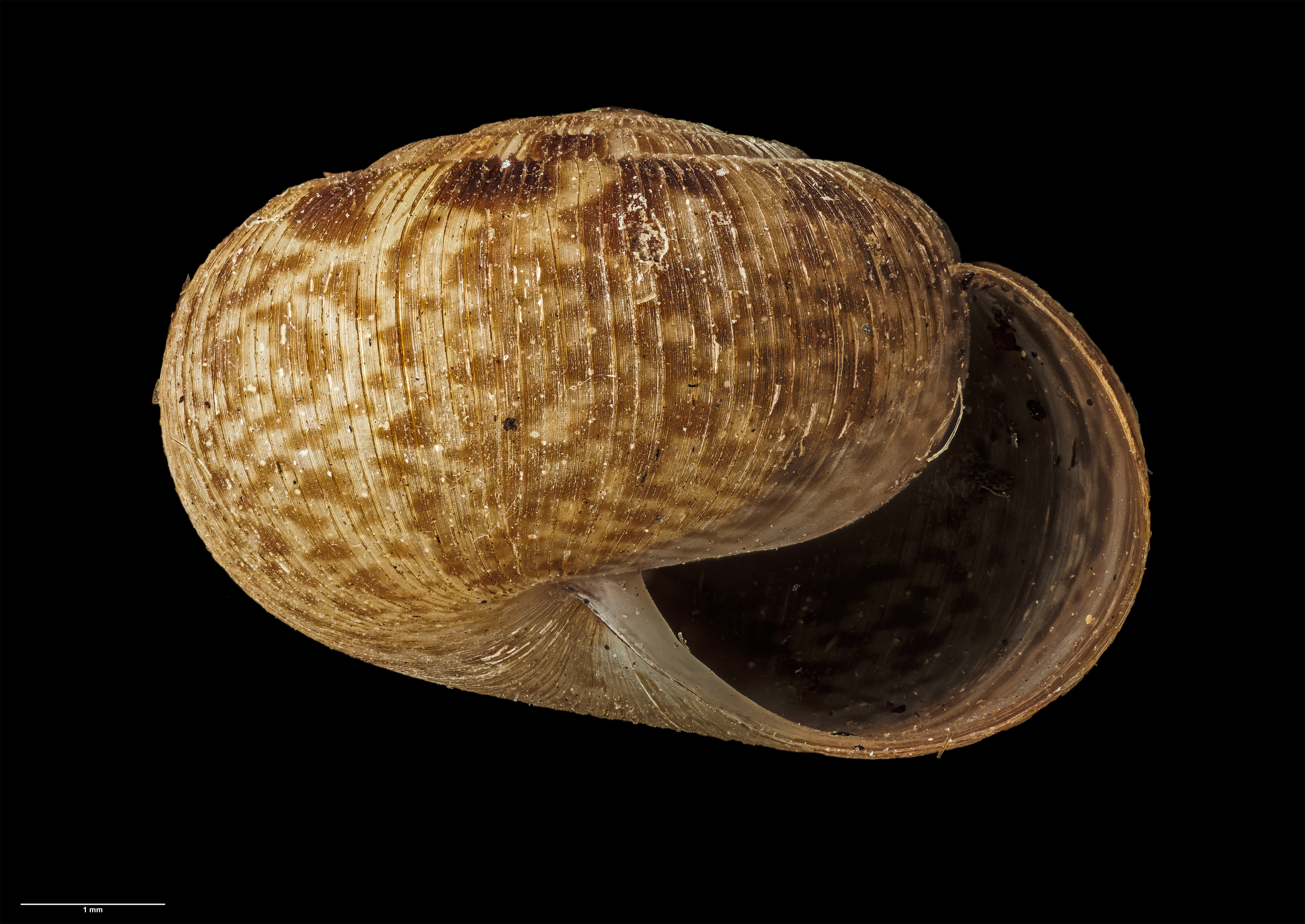
Side view of A. spiritus holotype

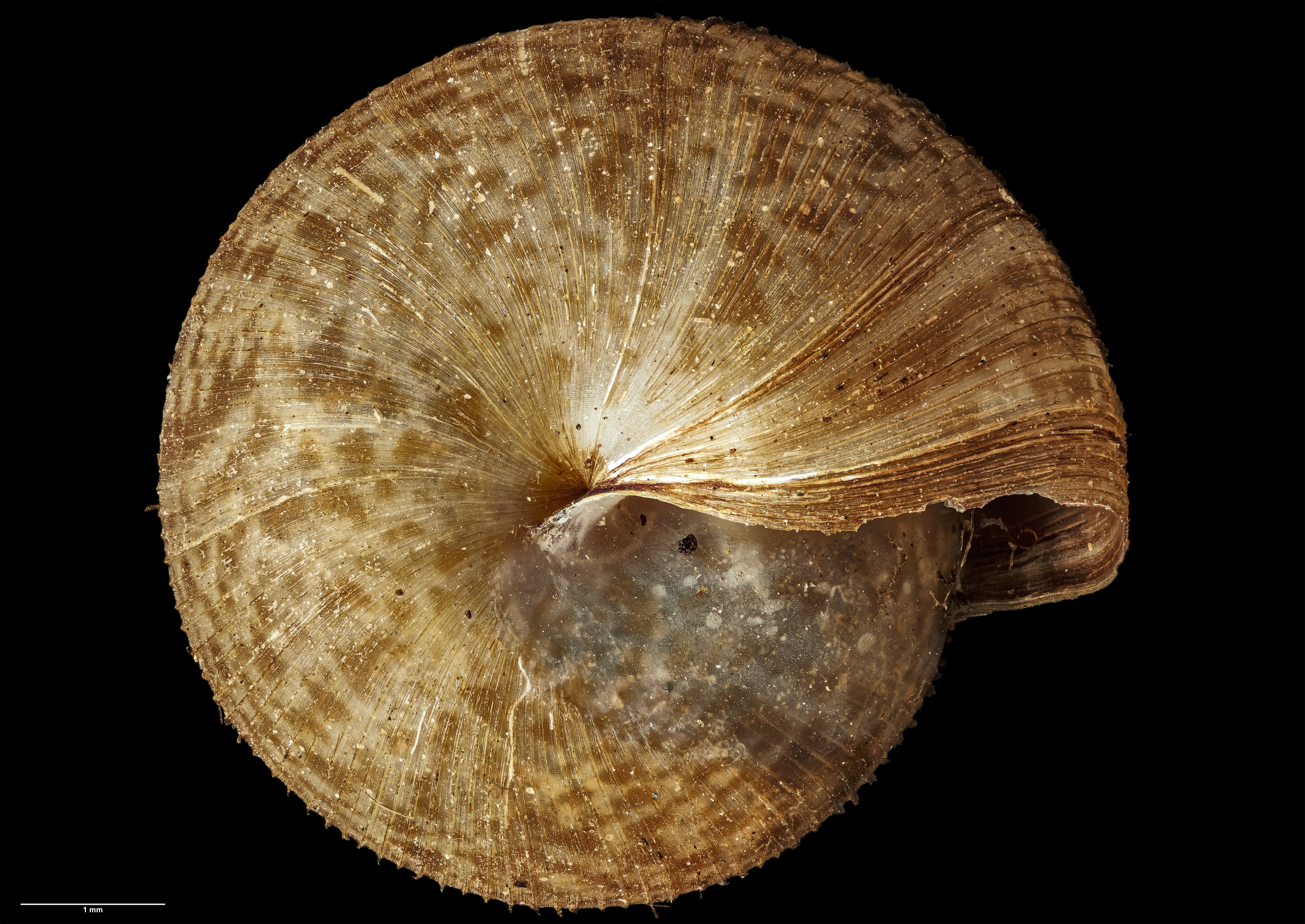
Underside view of A. spiritus holotype
