= Lake Waiporohita =

Lake in the North Island of New Zealand

- Location within Northland Region
- Location: Northland Region, North Island
- Coordinates: 34°54′S 173°21′E
- Catchment area: 52.7 hectares (130 acres)
- Basin countries: New Zealand
- Surface area: 6.8 hectares (17 acres)
- Max. depth: 3.5 metres (11 ft)

Lake Waiporohita is a dune lake in the Northland Region of New Zealand. It is located near Tokerau Beach on the Karikari Peninsula.

The small lake has no inflows or outflows. The lake catchment is primarily fenced pasture, with some Manuka scrub and Pohutukawa.

The lake is monitored by Northland Regional Council, and the environmental information can be viewed on the LAWA website.

== See also ==
- List of lakes in New Zealand
