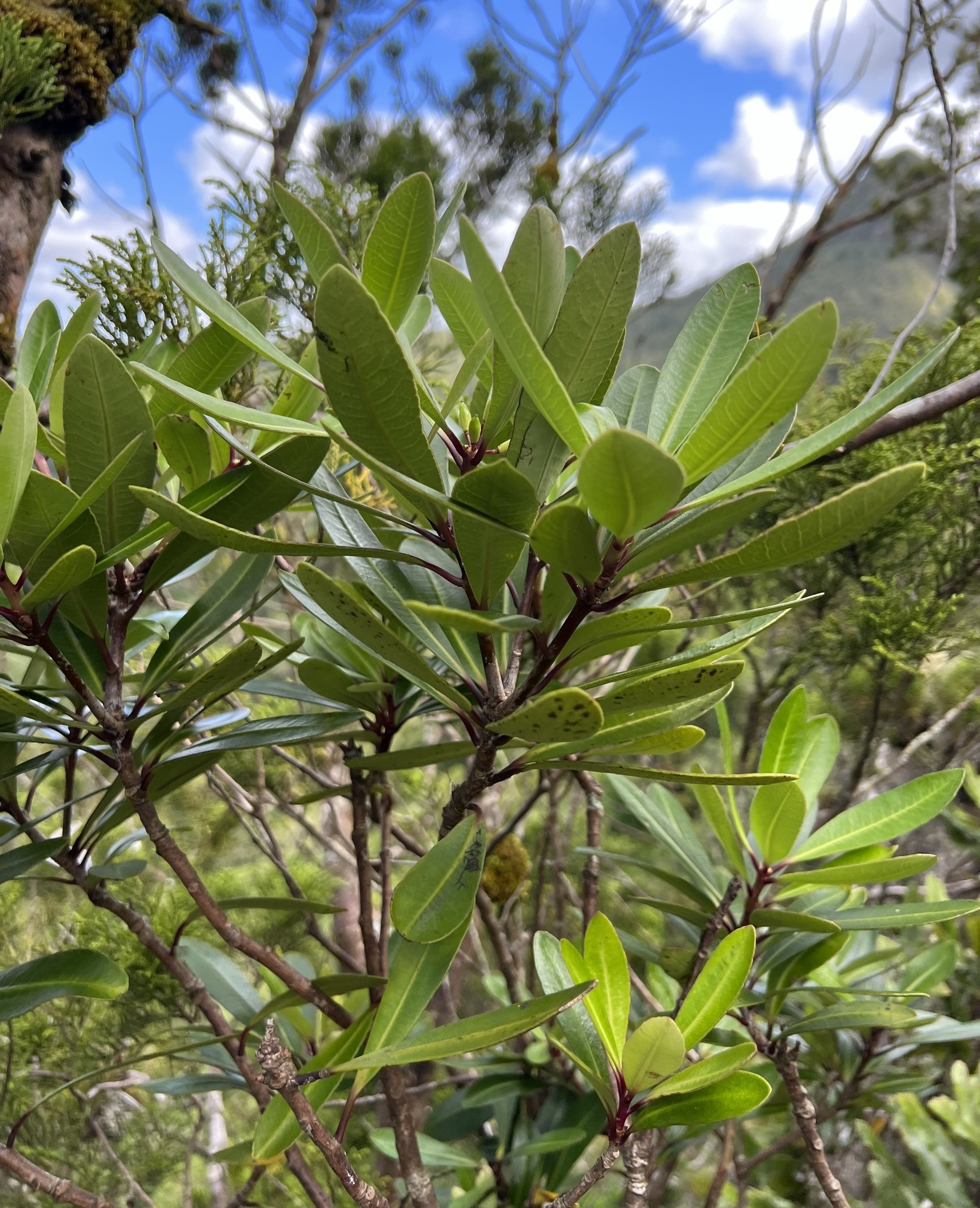
- A Kirk's kōhūhū (P. kirkii) in the Coromandel Peninsula

Conservation status
- Declining (NZ TCS)

Scientific classification
- Kingdom: Plantae
- Clade: Tracheophytes
- Clade: Angiosperms
- Clade: Eudicots
- Clade: Asterids
- Order: Apiales
- Family: Pittosporaceae
- Genus: Pittosporum
- Species: P. kirkii

Binomial name
- Pittosporum kirkii Hook.f. ex Kirk

= Pittosporum kirkii =

Species of shrub endemic to New Zealand

Pittosporum kirkii, commonly known as Kirk's kōhūhū or the thick-leaved kohukohu, is an evergreen perennial shrub in the family Pittosporaceae. It is endemic to New Zealand with a known restricted geographical range in the North Island, extending from the Northland Region to the Whanganui River, in the Manawatū-Whanganui region. It is also found on some of the North Island's offshore islands (such as Great Barrier Island).

P. kirkii was first described in 1869 by Joseph Dalton Hooker from material collected by Thomas Kirk. Hooker named the species in honour of Kirk by applying the specific epithet "kirkii" to the species. P. kirkii is usually epiphytic and grows up to 5 metres (16 ft) in height and has thick and leathery leaves that are widest towards the tip and with yellowish-green coloured capsules. Its trunk can be up to 10 cm (3.9 in) in diameter. Flowering occurs from October to December, producing yellow-coloured flowers. P. kirkii was assessed in 2023 by the New Zealand Threat Classification System as "At Risk – Declining", the decline of P. kirkii has been attributed to forest clearance and the introduction of bushtail possums.

== Description ==
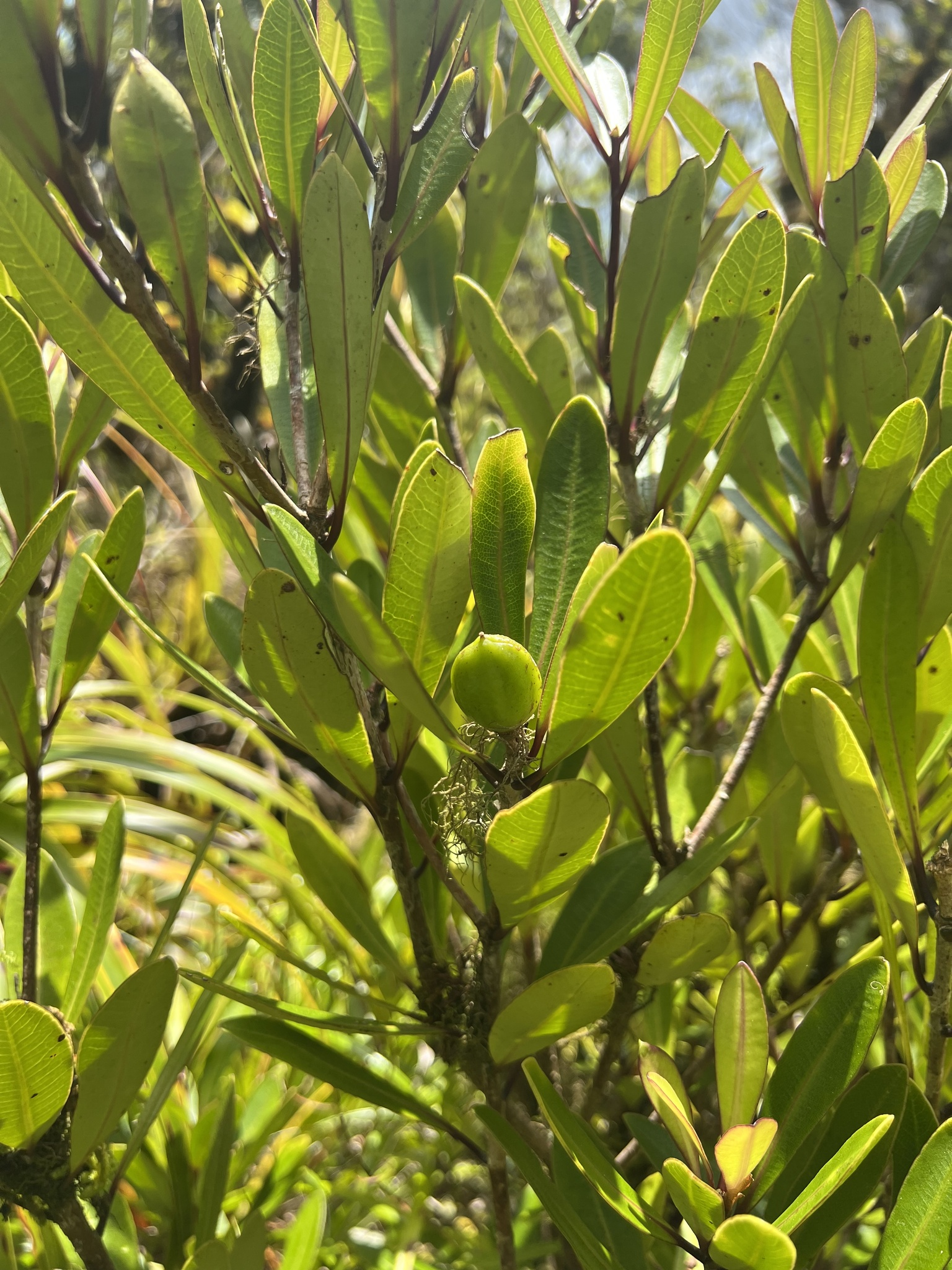
Leafage of Kirk's kōhūhū (P. Kirkii) in Pirongia Forest Park, in the Waikato Region

Pittosporum kirkii is an evergreen perennial shrub in the family Pittosporaceae, endemic to the northern half of the North Island (and some of its offshore islands) of New Zealand. It is usually epiphytic (meaning it often grows on other trees). P. kirkii has thick and leathery leaves that are widest towards the tip and with yellowish-green coloured capsules. Its leaves are 5–10 cm (2.0–3.9 in) long and 2–3 cm (0.79–1.18 in) wide. Flowering occurs from October to December; the flowers are yellow. Fruiting occurs from January to May, with a 2.5–4 cm (0.98–1.57 in) long fruit, which splits into two showing its black seeds inside a yellow pith.

P. kirkii grows to 1–5 m (3 ft 3 in – 16 ft 5 in) in height with a trunk up to 10 cm (3.9 in) in diameter. It is usually epiphytic, though some individuals grow by themselves; rarely, they grow on rock surfaces.

Its trunk holds densely arranged light green-brown coloured branches, with reddish-to-purple coloured branchlets. Its petioles are purple-reddish in colour and are 0.1–0.2 mm broad and short, 0.3–1.6 mm in length. The leaves are egg to oval shaped and are 4–12 cm (1.6–4.7 in) long and 0.7–3.2 cm (0.28–1.26 in) broad. Its leaves are also generally coriaceous and are dark to pale green in colour. Its inflorescences (flower spikes) are pedicellate, complete and pentamerous (except for the gynoecia). The inflorescences have 1–10 flowers and are supported by 5–10 mm pedicels, subtended by numerous bud scales 1–2 mm long.

== Taxonomy ==
Pittosporum kirkii was first described by Joseph Dalton Hooker from material collected by Thomas Kirk, possibly from the Thames Goldfields, and published in 1869. Kirk provided brief descriptions for several unnamed species of the genus Pittosporum in his seminal paper on Great Barrier Island. Kirk's brief description of a new species "Pittosporum n. sp.?" was sent to Hooker along with a herbarium specimen of the species in 1868. Hooker named the species in honour of Kirk by applying the specific epithet "kirkii". Kirk did not designate a holotype specimen, but he mentioned that the species was originally discovered on Great Barrier Island, though he does not give the type locality in his description.

Kirk's original species description (published in 1869) reads:

Pittosporum Kirkii, Hook. f., n. sp., A handsome, laxly-branched shrub, 3–15 feet high, branchlets stout, rigid, ascending; bark reddish-purple, leaves alternate, crowded or whorled, linear-obovate, acute or obtuse, 2–5 inches long, gradually narrowed into rather broad purple petioles, excessively coriaceous, glabrous, pale-green above, lighter below, midrib stout, prominent and cuiously flattened beneath; flowers terminal in 3–7 flowered umbels, peduncles rather stout, decurved; sepals broadly lanceolate with membranous margins; petals ligulate, bright yellow, recurved; capsules erect, clustered, glabrous, elliptic, 1–1 1/2 inches long, obtuse, 2-valved, remarkably compressed, but the valves contract in a curious manner when the capsule bursts.

=== Phylogeny ===
A 2001 thesis on the phylogenetic research of P. kirkii placed the species alongside its sister taxa P. dalli within the primary New Zealand Pittosporum clade, originating with all other New Zealand species approximately 13.5 million years ago. A second clade contains P. pimeleoides subspecies and P. cornifolium, which are believed to have originated from New Caledonia.

=== Etymology ===
The etymology of the name of the genus derives from Latin, Pittosporum, translates to English as 'pitch seed'. The specific epithet, kirkii, is named in honour of the New Zealand botanist, Thomas Kirk. P. kirkii is also commonly referred to as "Kirk's kōhūhū" and the "thick-leaved kohukohu".

== Gallery ==
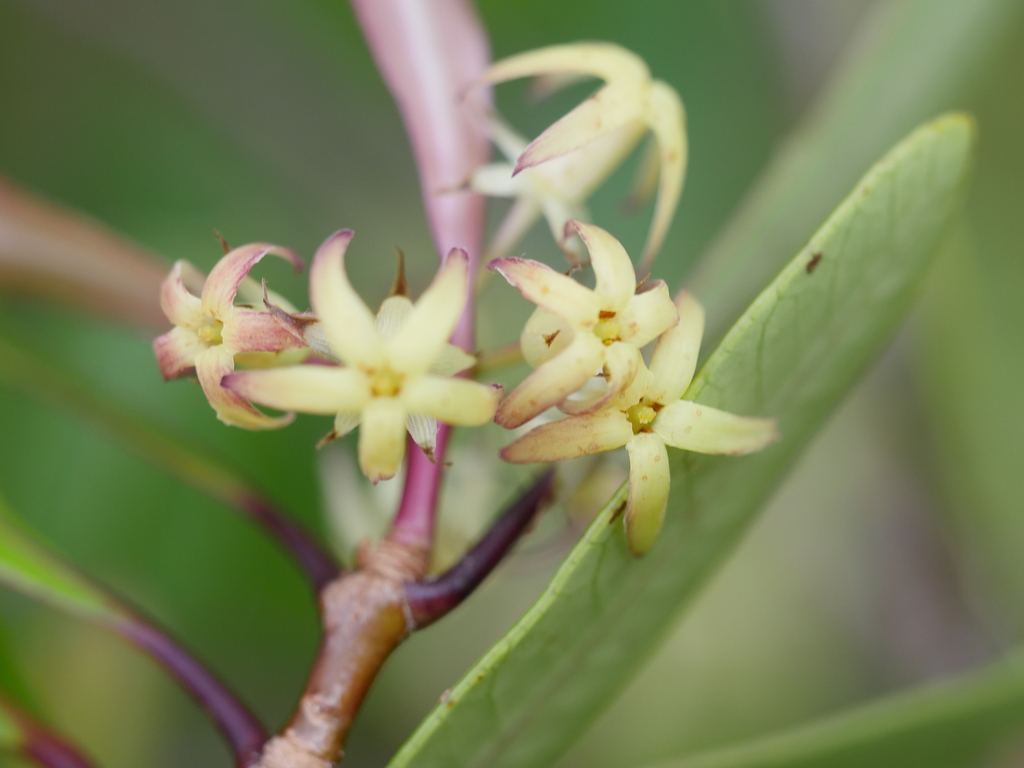
Inflorescence

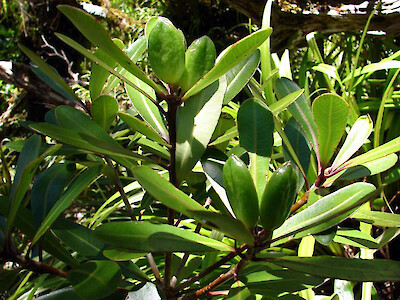
Capsules

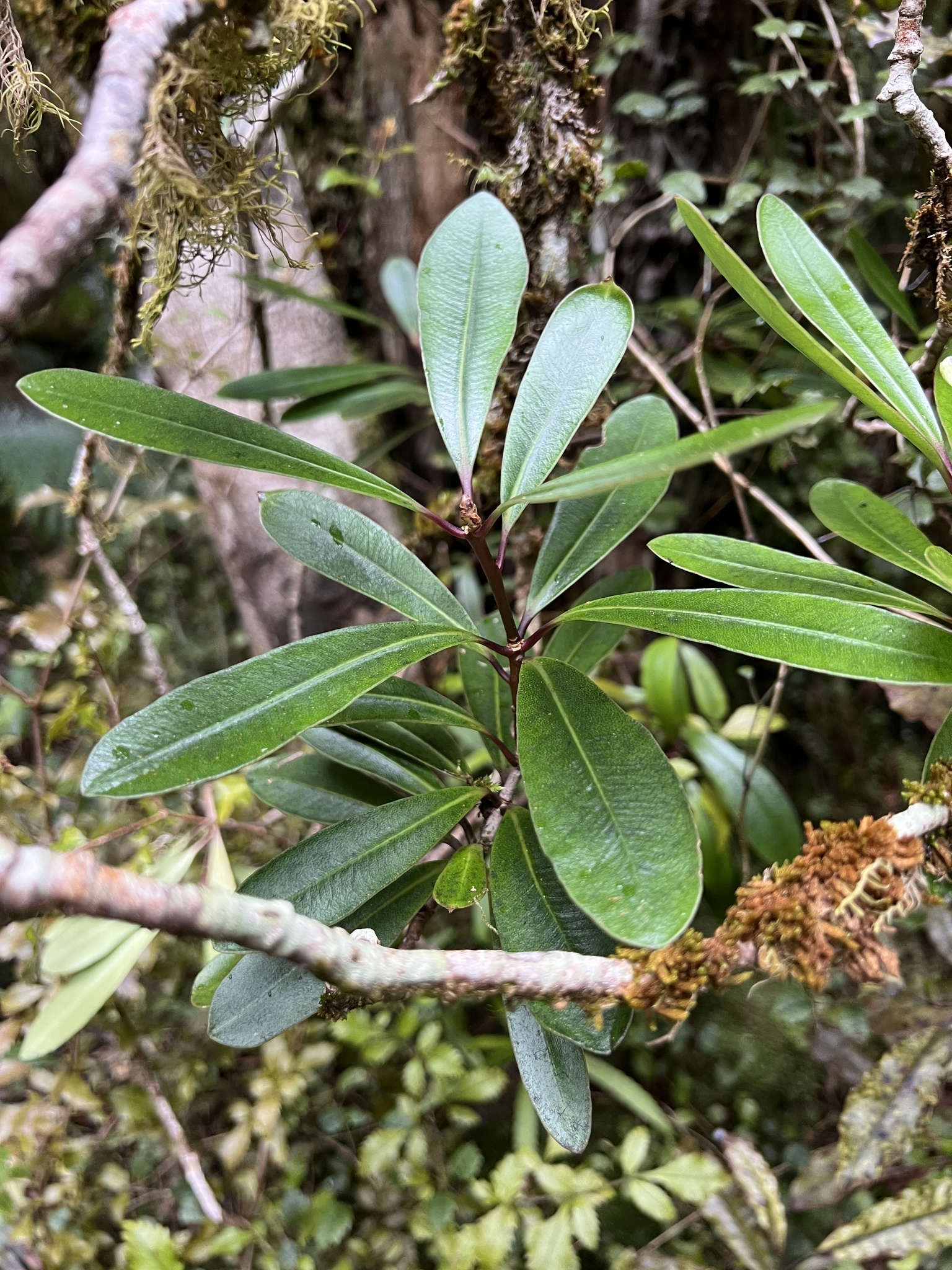
P. kirkii on tāwari

== Distribution ==
Pittosporum kirkii is endemic to New Zealand and has a known restricted geographical range in the North Island, extending from Karikari Peninsula and Mangōnui in the Northland Region and south of the Whanganui River (in the Manawatū-Whanganui region) and west to Mount Taranaki. P. kirkii is also found on some of the North Island's offshore islands such as Great Barrier Island and Little Barrier Island. P. kirkii has an estimated mean altitude range of 50–1,116 m (164–3,661 ft) above sea level.

Pittosporum kirkii is naturally not present in the Taupō Volcanic Zone, because the environmental conditions are unfavourable; though, the vegetation composition has been significantly impacted by the extensive ecological disturbance brought about by the 186 AD eruption in Taupō. P. kirkii's natural habitat is in dense forest usually growing near (or on) other plants in suitable sites with limited browsing animals, it can also be observed to be found on visible rock and rubble slopes.

== Ecology ==
It is unclear what the specific pollinators of P. kirkii are, though the flowers are likely entomophilous, as they have unspecialised structures and are small in size. In the cross-pollination of its flowers, flies likely dominant in the area, because as they were observed on the leaves of P. kirkii individuals. The fruit of P. kirkii and other endemic Pittosporum species, are consumed by introduced brushtail possums (an invasive species in New Zealand).

== Conservation ==
Pittosporum kirkii was assessed in 2023 by the New Zealand Threat Classification System as "At Risk – Declining"; it is also considered naturally uncommon. The decline of P. kirkii has been attributed to forest clearance and the introduction of brushtail possums. It is possible that the habitat of P. kirkii was historically occupied and impacted by the forest clearance of favoured "host trees" within its distribution area. An emerging threat to the northern populations of P. kirkii is kauri dieback. In long-term conservation monitoring strategies, P. kirkii is included as an "indicator species" for healthy old-growth forests. The gradual and continuous population decline of P. kirkii make conservation management crucial.

== See also ==
- Flora of New Zealand
