= Lake Rotopokaka =

Lake in the North Island of New Zealand

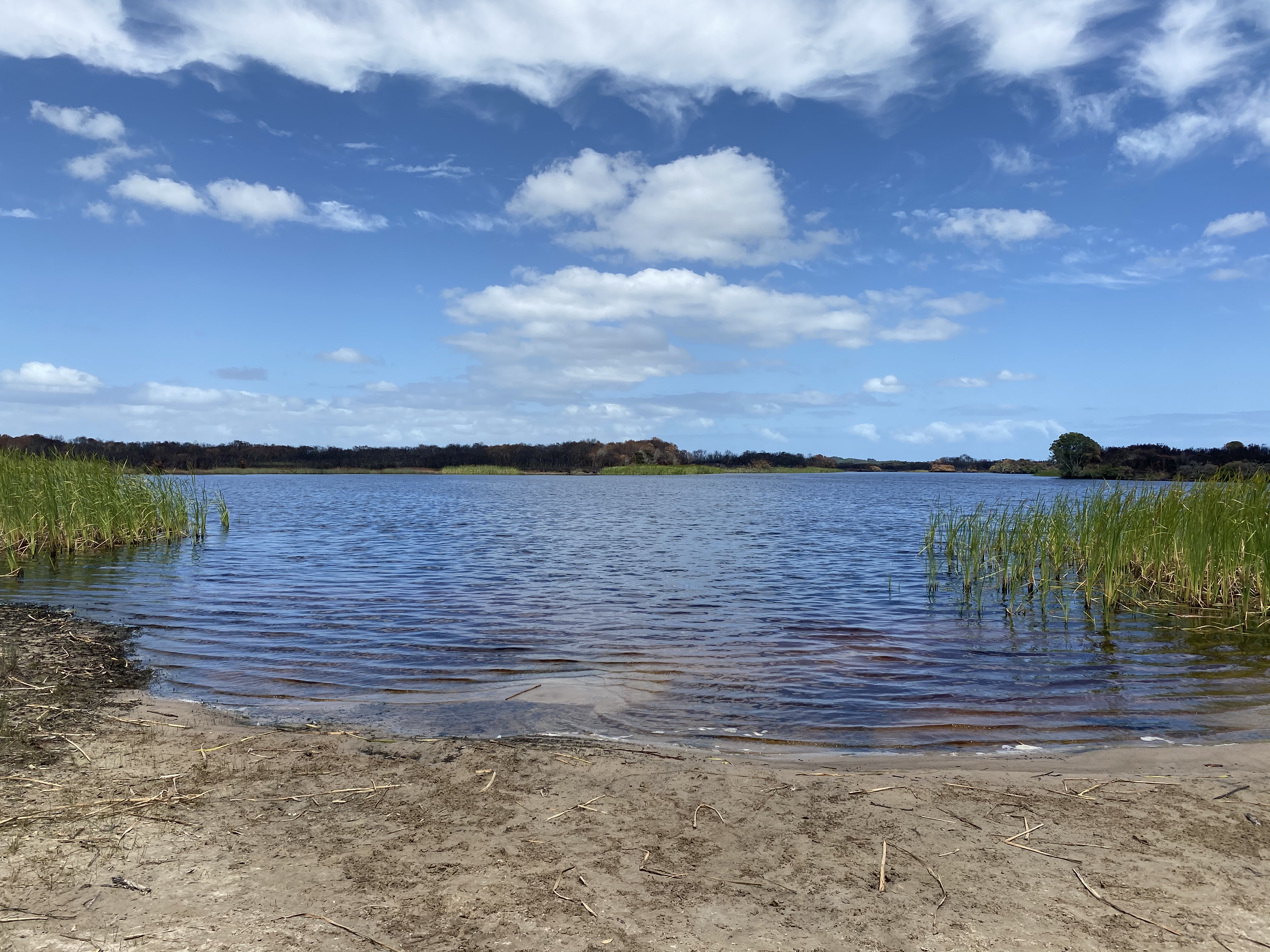
- Lake Rotopokaka in 2020

- Location within Northland Region
- Location: Far North District, Northland Region, North Island
- Coordinates: 34.950°S 173.383°E
- Type: Dune lake
- Basin countries: New Zealand
- Surface area: 11 hectares (27 acres)
- Max. depth: 3.5 m (11 ft)

Lake Rotopokaka is a dune lake in the Far North District of New Zealand. It is adjacent to Tokerau Beach on the east coast of the Karikari Peninsula. The lake is also known as 'Coca Cola lake' as the peat and tannins in the water give the lake a distinct 'cola' colour.

The lake has no inflows or outflows. The surrounding catchment is a mixture of mānuka scrub, pōhutukawa, cabbage trees and flax.

The lake is a popular recreation area and can be accessed off Ramp Road.
