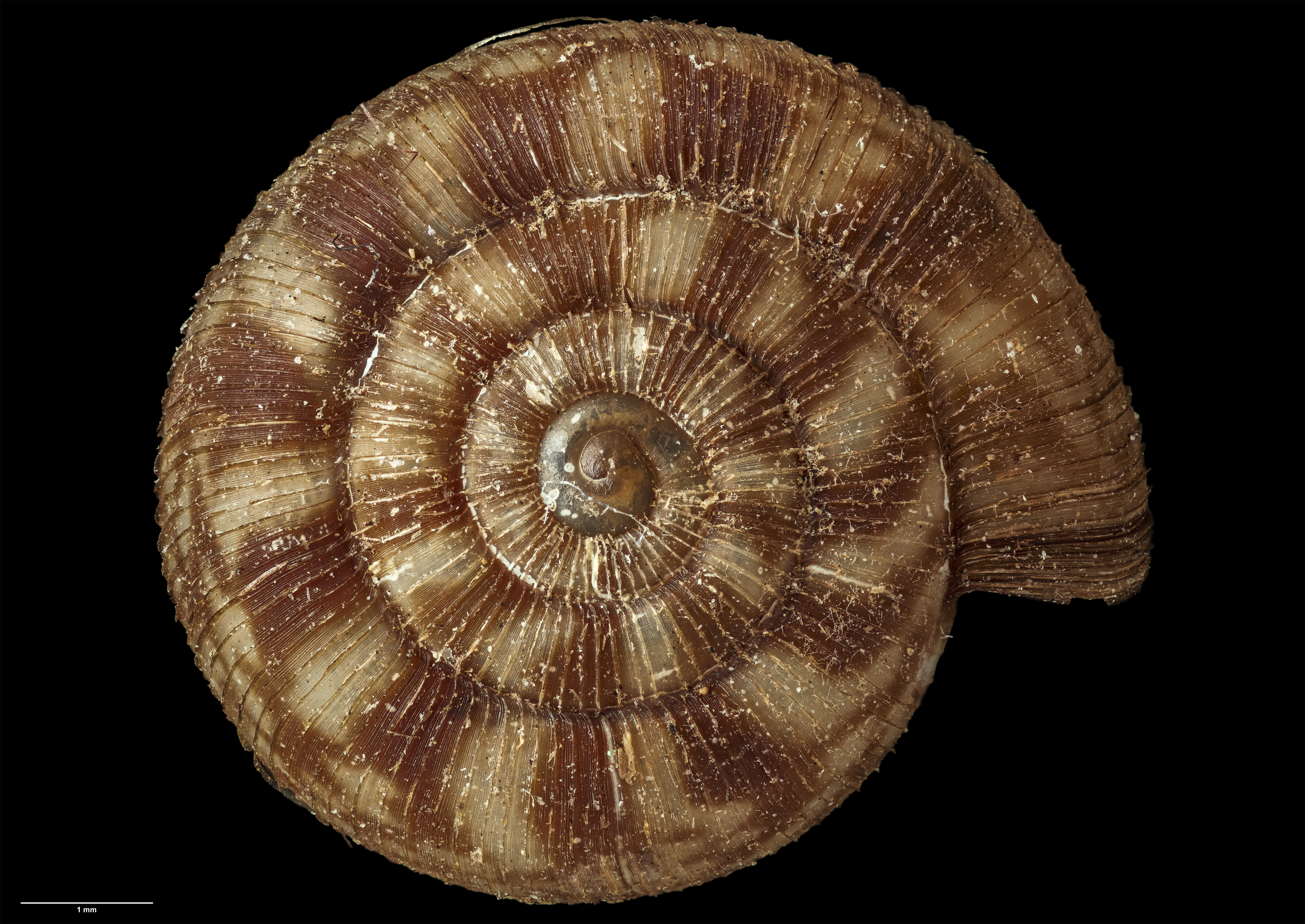
- Holotype

Conservation status
- Nationally Endangered (NZ TCS)

Scientific classification
- Kingdom: Animalia
- Phylum: Mollusca
- Class: Gastropoda
- Order: Stylommatophora
- Family: Charopidae
- Subfamily: Charopinae
- Genus: Allodiscus
- Species: A. fallax

Binomial name
- Allodiscus fallax A. W. B. Powell, 1952

= Allodiscus fallax =

Species of land snail

Allodiscus fallax is a species of land snail belonging to the family Charopidae. The species is endemic to the Karikari Peninsula of Northland, New Zealand, and is known to occur exclusively native coastal forest remnants in an area of only approximately 10 ha (25 acres) in area.

== Description ==
In the original description, Powell described the species as follows:

Shell of similar size and shape to dimorphus but with a darker and more clear-cut tessellated pattern, as well as more numerous axials, 75 to 80 on the penultimate, compared with 45 to 48 in dimorphus. Interstices of radials with 8 to 10 secondary radial threads compared with 10-12 in dimorphus. Very dense and extremely fine spiral threads, only on the latter part of the protoconch, the first post-nuclear whorl and around the closed umbilicus. Whorls 5, including a depressed protoconch of almost two whorls, faintly malleated, with occasional axial growth lines and exceedingly fine dense spirals over the second whorl.

The holotype of the species measures 4.75 mm (0.187 in) in height and 7.25 mm (0.285 in) in diameter, with individuals having shells that reach up to 8.4 mm (0.33 in) in diameter. The protoconch has 1.25 convex whorls, and is translucent yellow-brown. The teleoconch has up to 3.2 broadly convex whorls, and is translucent with a pale buff and irregular red-brown marks. Juveniles have narrowly umbilicate shells.

The species is similar to Allodiscus austrodimorphus, but can be distinguished due to the spiral sculpture (reticulating secondary radials and fenestrating primary radials). A. fallax can be distinguished from most other members of Allodiscus due to having 75-80 primary radials on the penultimate. While Powell suggested that A. fallax can be distinguished morphologically from A. dimorphus, both species have varying colours and colour patterns, and can only be conclusively distinguished due to geographic location and genetic differences.

== Taxonomy ==
The species was first described by A. W. B. Powell in 1952. The holotype was collected from Oruru Bay near Knuckle Point on the Rangiāwhia Peninsula, Northland, New Zealand on 29 January 1950, and is held by the Auckland War Memorial Museum.

Powell suggests that A. fallax may have developed as a distinct species when the Karikari Peninsula was an island separated from New Zealand, which occurred during the Pliocene.

== Distribution and habitat ==
The species is endemic to New Zealand, found on the Karikari Peninsula, Northland, in an area approximately 10 ha (25 acres) in size. The holotype was found under leaf mould in coastal scrub on steep cliff face, in a native coastal forest remnants.

== Conservation status ==
Under the New Zealand Threat Classification System, A. fallax is a Nationally Endangered species, due to the species only being known from a single location.

== Gallery ==
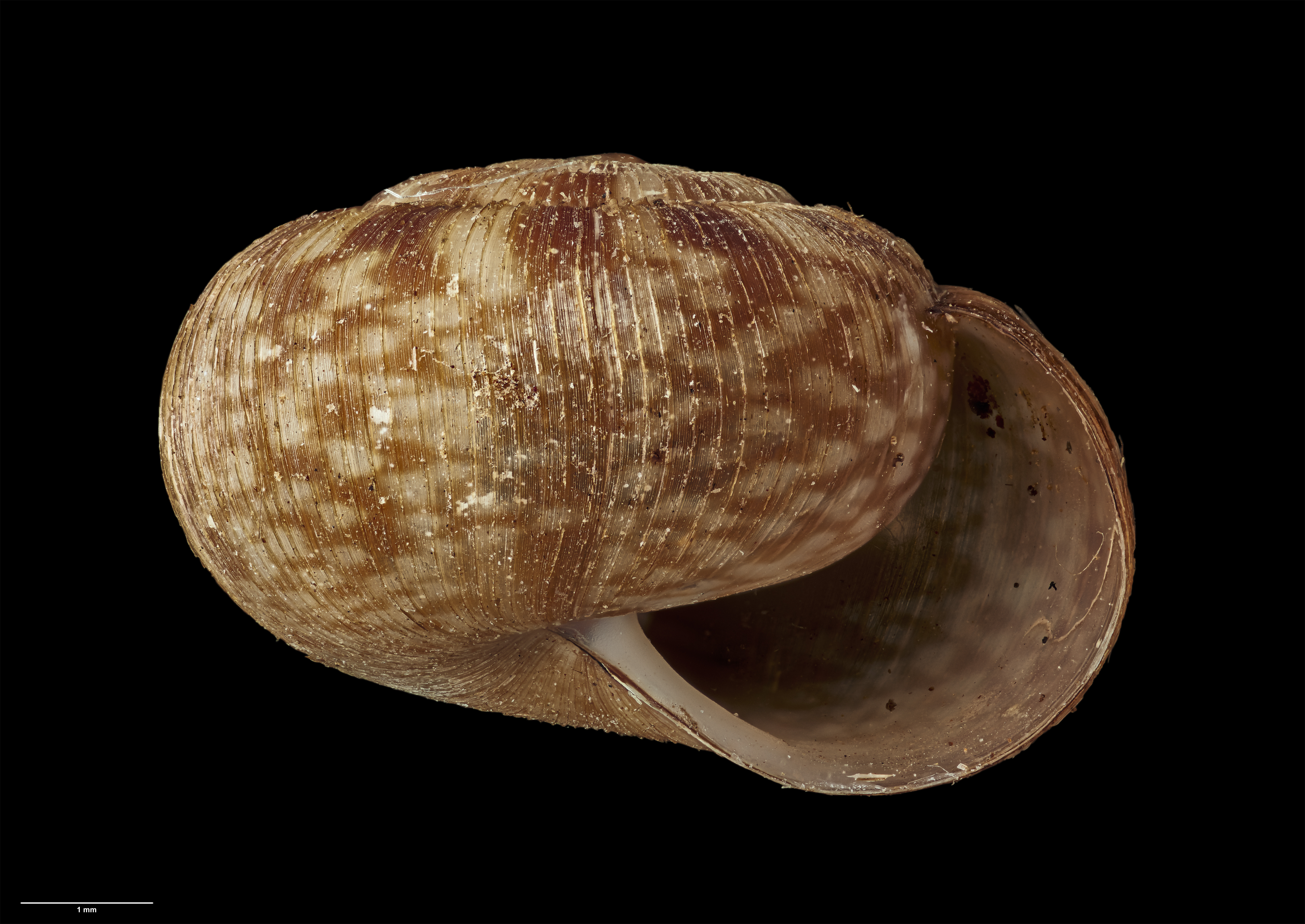
Side view of A. fallax holotype

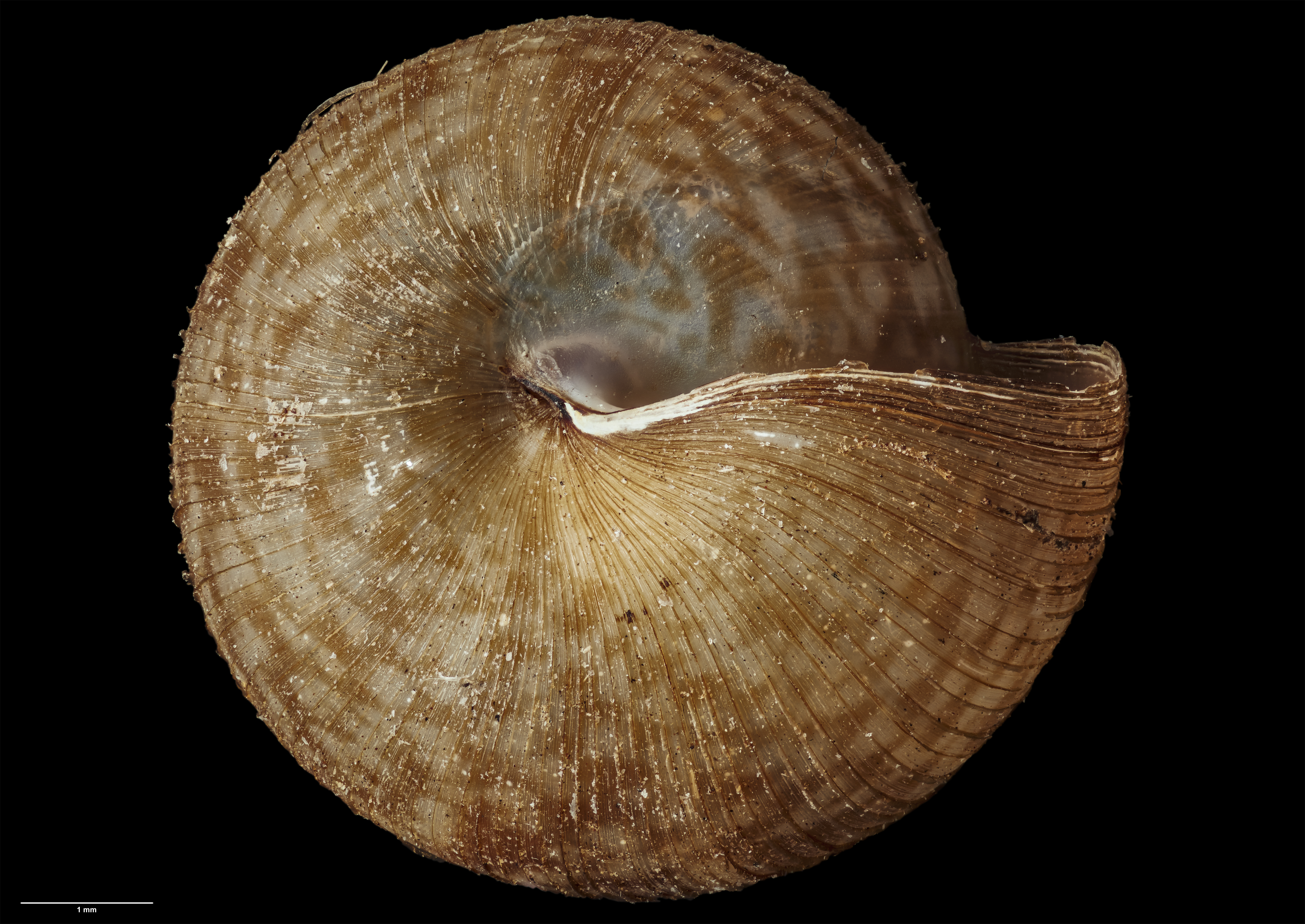
Underside view of A. fallax holotype
