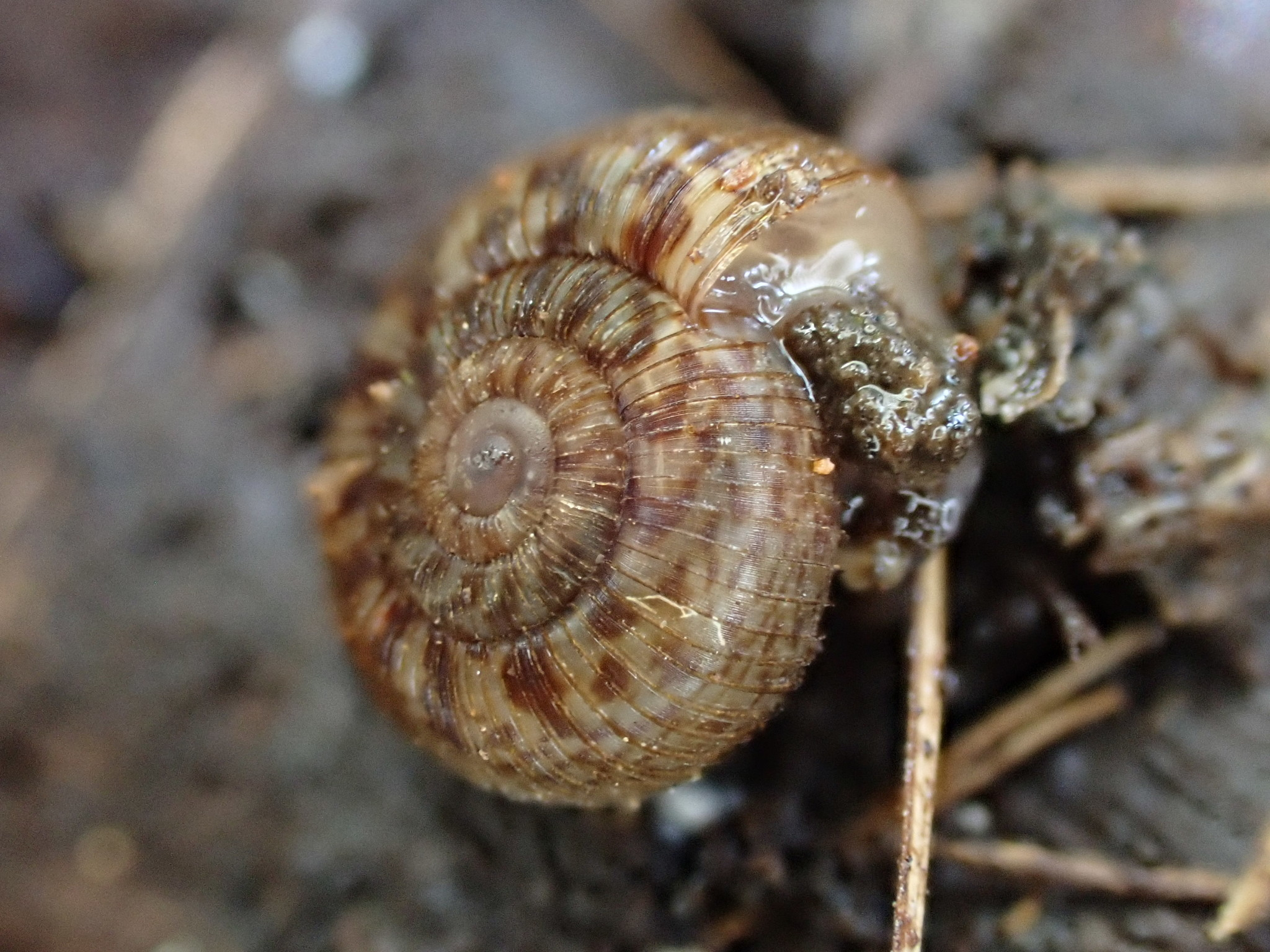
- Allodiscus dimorphus

Scientific classification
- Domain: Eukaryota
- Kingdom: Animalia
- Phylum: Mollusca
- Class: Gastropoda
- Order: Stylommatophora
- Family: Charopidae
- Subfamily: Charopinae
- Genus: Allodiscus; Pilsbry, 1892

Species
- See text

Synonyms
- Allodisens Gabriel, 1929; Psyra Hutton, 1883; Pysra Pilsbry, 1892

= Allodiscus =

Genus of land snails

Allodiscus is a genus of land snails belonging to the family Charopidae. The genus was described by Henry Augustus Pilsbry in 1892.

== Taxonomy ==
Pilsbry in 1892 originally described Allodiscus as a subgenus of Helix, naming H. dimorpha (Allodiscus dimorphus) as the type species. A revision of the genus in 2008 saw the addition of 31 new species.

== Distribution ==
The genus is found in New Zealand, the New Zealand Subantarctic Islands and on New Caledonia.

== Species ==
- Allodiscus absidatus B.A.Marshall & G.M.Barker, 2008
- Allodiscus adriana (F.W.Hutton, 1883)
- Allodiscus aurora B.A.Marshall & G.M.Barker, 2008
- Allodiscus austrodimorphus Dell, 1955
- Allodiscus basiliratus N.W.Gardner, 1967
- Allodiscus brooki B.A.Marshall & G.M.Barker, 2008
- Allodiscus camelinus B.A.Marshall & G.M.Barker, 2008
- Allodiscus cassandra (Hutton, 1883)
- Allodiscus chion (Sykes, 1896)
- Allodiscus climoi B.A.Marshall & G.M.Barker, 2008
- Allodiscus cooperi (Suter, 1907)
- Allodiscus cryptobidens (Suter, 1891)
- Allodiscus dimorphus (Reeve, 1852)
- Allodiscus ergodes B.A.Marshall & G.M.Barker, 2008
- Allodiscus erua B.A.Marshall & G.M.Barker, 2008
- Allodiscus fallax Powell, 1952
- Allodiscus godeti (Suter, 1891)
- Allodiscus goulstonei B.A.Marshall & G.M.Barker, 2008
- Allodiscus hazelwoodi B.A.Marshall & G.M.Barker, 2008
- Allodiscus kakano B.A.Marshall & G.M.Barker, 2008
- Allodiscus laganus B.A.Marshall & G.M.Barker, 2008
- Allodiscus mahlfeldae B.A.Marshall & G.M.Barker, 2008
- Allodiscus mirificus B.A.Marshall & G.M.Barker, 2008
- Allodiscus morioria B.A.Marshall & G.M.Barker, 2008
- Allodiscus negiae B.A.Marshall & G.M.Barker, 2008
- Allodiscus nematophorus (Reeve, 1854)
- Allodiscus occidaneus B.A.Marshall & G.M.Barker, 2008
- Allodiscus pallidus B.A.Marshall & G.M.Barker, 2008
- Allodiscus patulus B.A.Marshall & G.M.Barker, 2008
- Allodiscus pumilus B.A.Marshall & G.M.Barker, 2008
- Allodiscus punakaiki B.A.Marshall & G.M.Barker, 2008
- Allodiscus pygmaeus B.A.Marshall & G.M.Barker, 2008
- Allodiscus southlandicus B.A.Marshall & G.M.Barker, 2008
- Allodiscus spiritus Powell, 1952
- Allodiscus tataensis (Climo, 1971)
- Allodiscus tawhiti B.A.Marshall & G.M.Barker, 2008
- Allodiscus tessellatus Powell, 1941
- Allodiscus tongariro B.A.Marshall & G.M.Barker, 2008
- Allodiscus turbotti Powell, 1948
- Allodiscus undulatus B.A.Marshall & G.M.Barker, 2008
- Allodiscus urquharti Suter, 1894
- Allodiscus venulatus (L.Pfeiffer, 1857)
- Allodiscus wairarapa B.A.Marshall & G.M.Barker, 2008
- Allodiscus wairoaensis Suter, 1894
- Allodiscus wairua B.A.Marshall & G.M.Barker, 2008
- Allodiscus waitomo B.A.Marshall & G.M.Barker, 2008
- Allodiscus waitutu B.A.Marshall & G.M.Barker, 2008
- Allodiscus worthyi B.A.Marshall & G.M.Barker, 2008
- Allodiscus yaldwyni B.A.Marshall & G.M.Barker, 2008
