= Tokerau Beach =

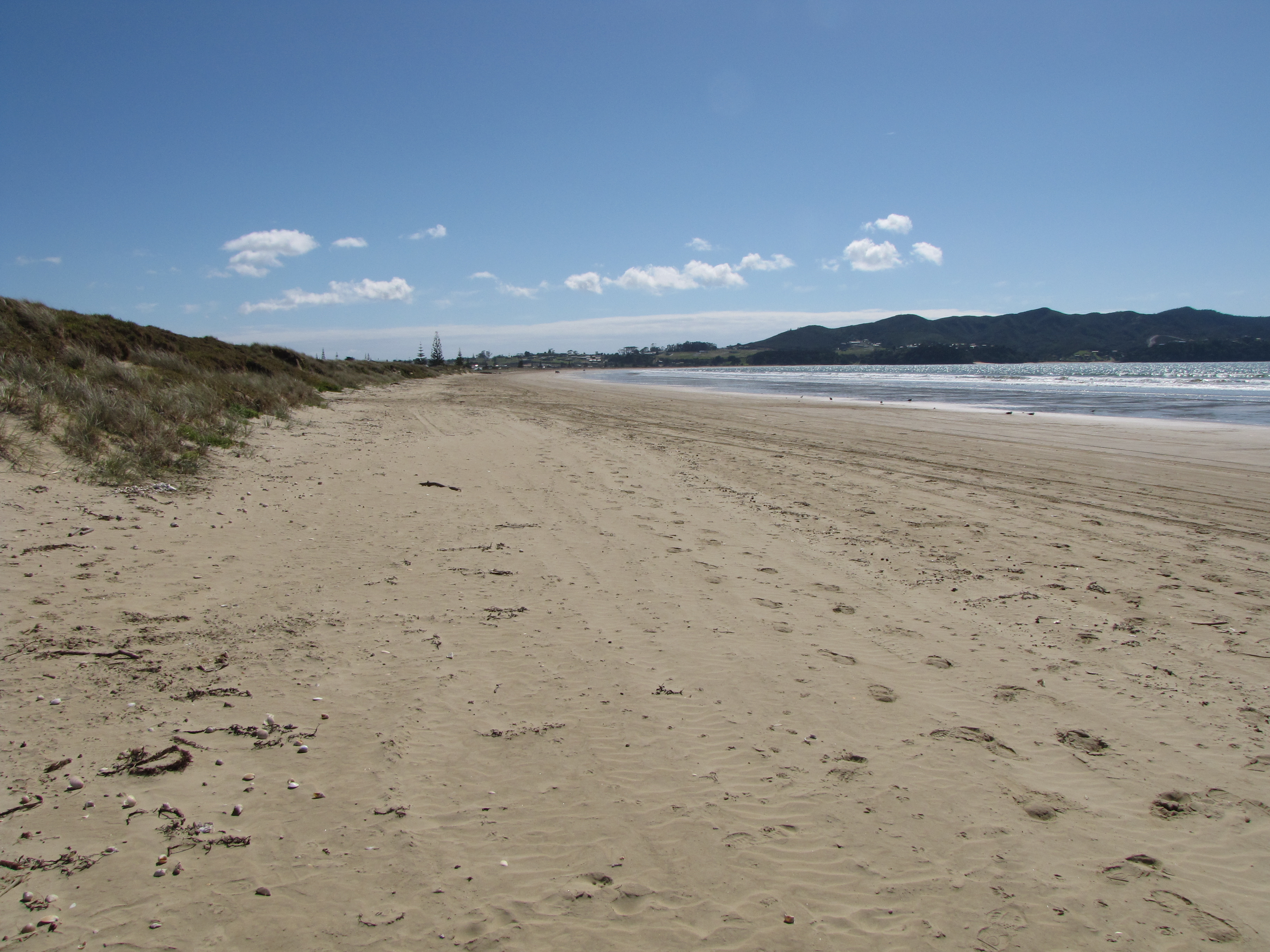
- Tokerau Beach, looking towards Whatuwhiwhi
- Interactive map of Tokerau Beach
- Coordinates: 34.884°S 173.371°E
- Country: New Zealand
- Region: Northland Region
- District: Far North District
- Ward: Te Hiku
- Community: Te Hiku
- Subdivision: Whatuwhiwhi
- Electorates: Northland; Te Tai Tokerau

Government
  - Territorial Authority: Far North District Council
  - Regional council: Northland Regional Council
  - Mayor of Far North: Moko Tepania
  - Northland MP: Grant McCallum
  - Te Tai Tokerau MP: Mariameno Kapa-Kingi

Area
  - Total: 0.78 km^{2} (0.30 sq mi)

Population (June 2025)
  - Total: 330
  - Density: 420/km^{2} (1,100/sq mi)

Tokerau Beach is a settlement on the northwestern side of Doubtless Bay on the Karikari Peninsula of Northland, New Zealand. It is near the northern end of the 18-kilometre (11 mi) beach that is also called Tokerau Beach.

== Demographics ==
Statistics New Zealand describes Tokerau Beach as a rural settlement. It covers 0.78 km^{2} (0.30 sq mi) and had an estimated population of 330 as of June 2025, with a population density of 423 people per km^{2}. Tokerau Beach is part of the larger Karikari Peninsula statistical area.

Historical population
Year	Pop.	±% p.a.
2006	153	—
2013	198	+3.75%
2018	237	+3.66%
2023	327	+6.65%

Tokerau Beach had a population of 327 in the 2023 New Zealand census, an increase of 90 people (38.0%) since the 2018 census, and an increase of 129 people (65.2%) since the 2013 census. There were 165 males, and 162 females in 141 dwellings. 0.9% of people identified as LGBTIQ+. The median age was 59.2 years (compared with 38.1 years nationally). There were 51 people (15.6%) aged under 15 years, 24 (7.3%) aged 15 to 29, 135 (41.3%) aged 30 to 64, and 120 (36.7%) aged 65 or older.

People could identify as more than one ethnicity. The results were 80.7% European (Pākehā); 33.0% Māori; 3.7% Pasifika; 0.9% Asian; 0.9% Middle Eastern, Latin American and African New Zealanders (MELAA); and 3.7% other, which includes people giving their ethnicity as "New Zealander". English was spoken by 100.0%, Māori language by 9.2%, and other languages by 3.7%. The percentage of people born overseas was 10.1, compared with 28.8% nationally.

Religious affiliations were 35.8% Christian, 1.8% Māori religious beliefs, and 0.9% other religions. People who answered that they had no religion were 55.0%, and 7.3% of people did not answer the census question.

Of those at least 15 years old, 36 (13.0%) people had a bachelor's or higher degree, 165 (59.8%) had a post-high school certificate or diploma, and 72 (26.1%) people exclusively held high school qualifications. The median income was $27,300, compared with $41,500 nationally. 15 people (5.4%) earned over $100,000 compared to 12.1% nationally. The employment status of those at least 15 was that 90 (32.6%) people were employed full-time, 33 (12.0%) were part-time, and 3 (1.1%) were unemployed.
