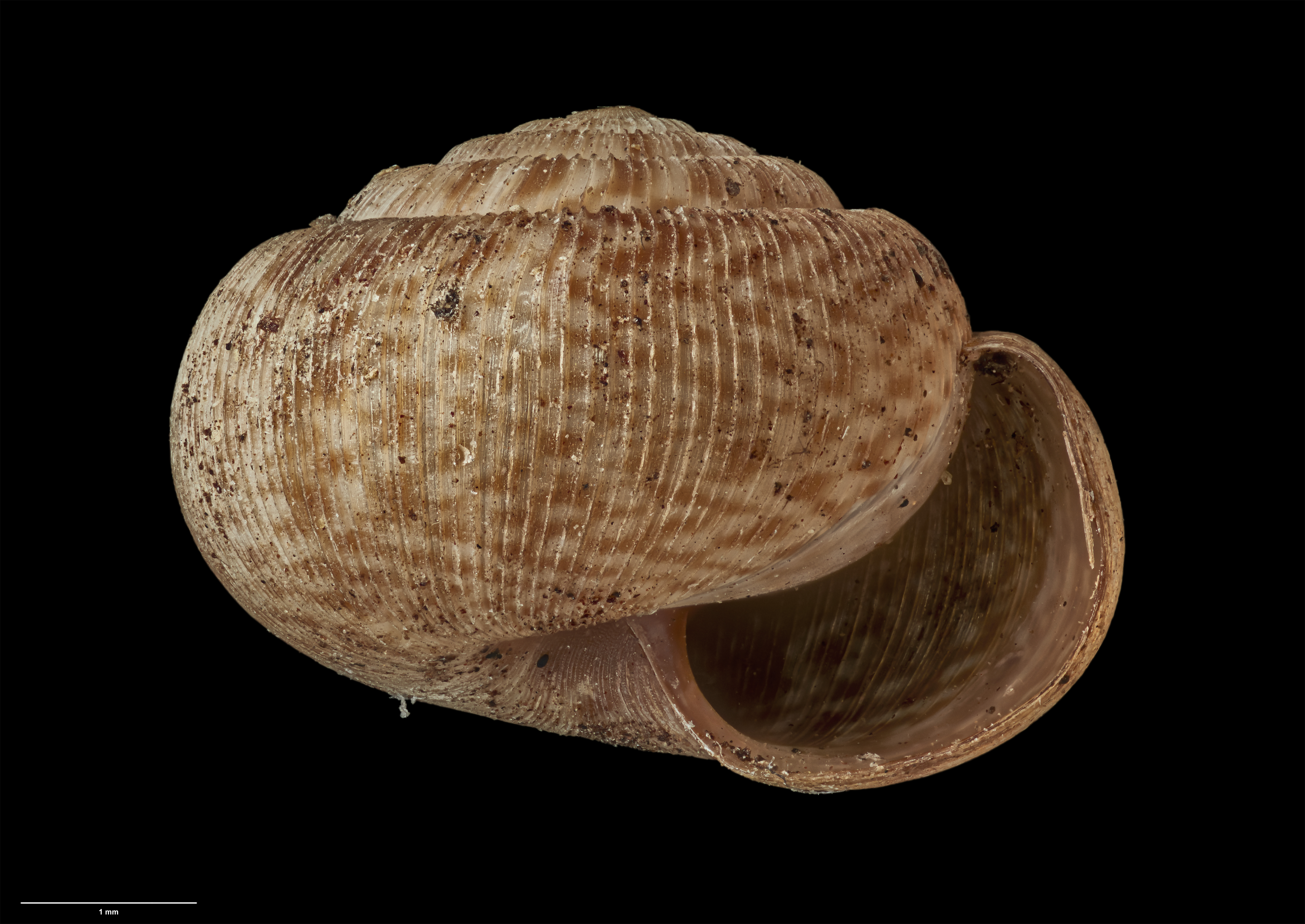
- Holotype of Allodiscus turbotti from the collections of Auckland War Memorial Museum

Conservation status
- Naturally Uncommon (NZ TCS)

Scientific classification
- Kingdom: Animalia
- Phylum: Mollusca
- Class: Gastropoda
- Order: Stylommatophora
- Family: Charopidae
- Genus: Allodiscus
- Species: A. turbotti

Binomial name
- Allodiscus turbotti Powell, 1948

= Allodiscus turbotti =

Species of land snail

Allodiscus turbotti is a species of land snail in the family, Charopidae. The species was first described by Baden Powell in 1948, and is endemic to Manawatāwhi / Three Kings Islands in New Zealand.

== Taxonomy ==
The species was identified by Powell in 1948, based on a shell found by Evan Graham Turbott on Manawatāwhi / Great Island in 1946, among sparse pōhutukawa and kanuka forest. Powell named the species after Turbott. Gene sequencing noted that A. turbotti was significantly different to other members of Allodiscus, meaning the species may potentially belong to a distinct genus.

== Description ==
Powell's original text (the type description) described below:

Shell globose, multicostate, umbilicate, pale-brown with a complicated pattern of radial bars, spots and chevrons. Whorls tightly coiled, 5½, including a low, convex protoconch of 14 whorls, all but the nucleus sculptured with closely-spaced thin radials. Spire about two-thirds height of aperture. Post-nuclear sculpture of dense narrow radials, 42 on the first whorl, 85 on the penultimate and about 150 on the bodywhorl. Interstices with from 4 to 10 exceedingly fine crisp radial threads. Radials flexuous, slightly protractive from suture and noticeably retractive before entering the umbilicus. Umbilicus open, one-tenth major diameter, deep, cylindrical, and slightly bridged by the reflexed inner lip. The base flattens somewhat towards the umbilicus and then resolves into a narrowly rounded encircling rim. Aperture lunate; peristome thin and flexuous, slightly protractive above, broadly rounded medially and deeply insinuated at the junction between the basal and inner sections of the lip. Suture deeply impressed, almost channelled. Colour pale brown with a chestnut colour pattern composed of irregular radially disposed rectangular patches at the suture which resolve into spots, and streaks of chevron form over the rest of the shell, base included. Major diameter, 5.7 mm (0.22 in).; minimum diameter, 5.1 mm (0.20 in).: height, 4.15 mm (0.163 in).

Powell noted that the species resembled A. cassandra, but could be told apart by A. turbotti being much smaller in adult size, open umbilicate, and by the presence of more numerous radial ribs. A. turbotti differs from other members of the genus due to prominent axial riblets on its protoconch, and finer spiral threads. The species has a radula formula of (11-12)+(7-8)+1+(7-8)+(11-12).

== Distribution and habitat ==
The species is endemic to New Zealand, found on three islands of the Manawatāwhi / Three Kings Islands group: Manawatāwhi / Great Island, Oromaki / North East Island and Moekawa / South West Island. The species is common on Manawatāwhi / Great Island, and less common on the other two islands. The snail lives in leaf litter of broadleaf and kanuka forests. Due to its preference for forest leaf litter, the species is significantly less common than A. cassandra.
