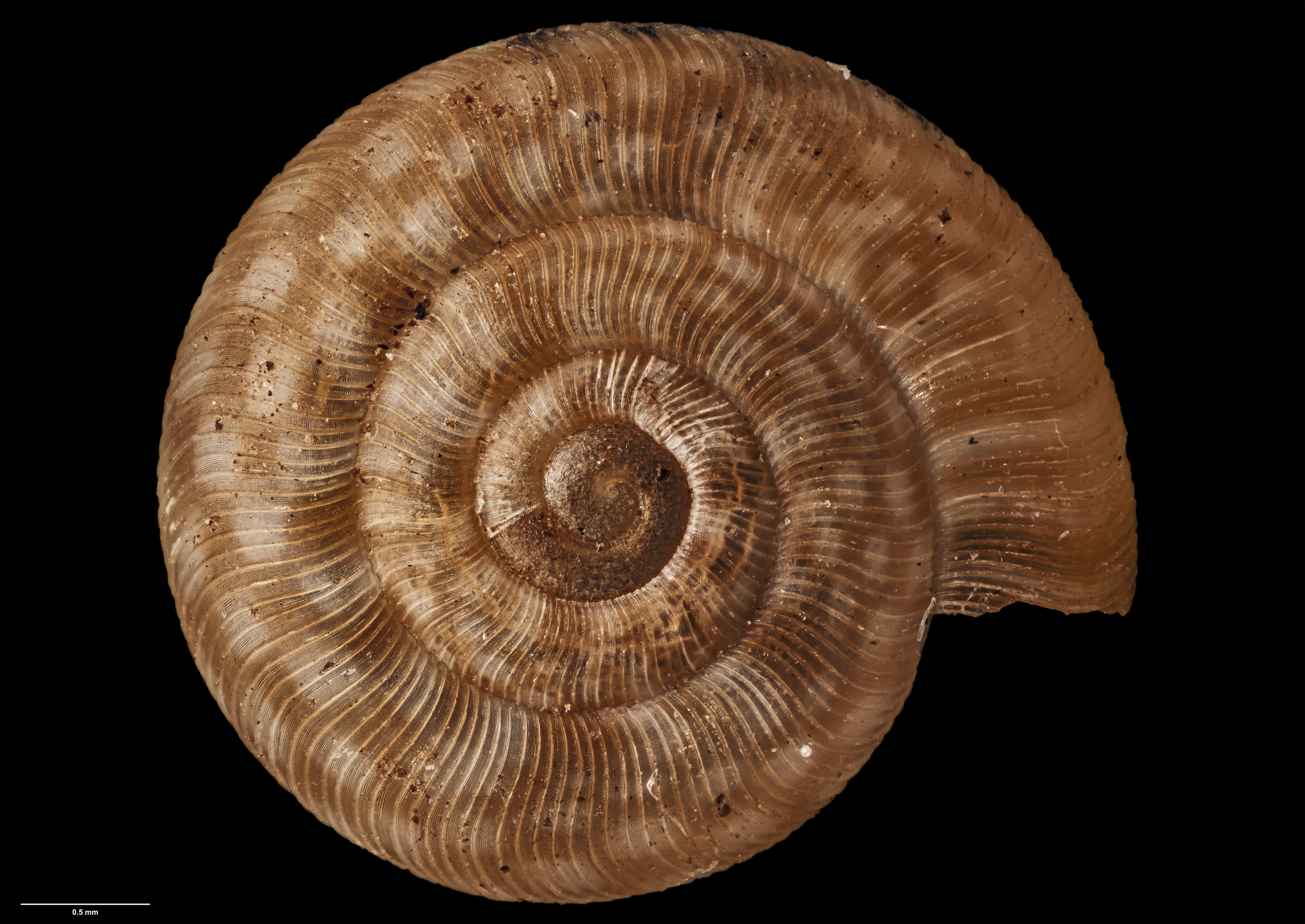
- Holotype from the Auckland War Memorial Museum

Scientific classification
- Kingdom: Animalia
- Phylum: Mollusca
- Class: Gastropoda
- Order: Stylommatophora
- Family: Charopidae
- Subfamily: Charopinae
- Genus: Allodiscus
- Species: A. tessellatus

Binomial name
- Allodiscus tessellatus A. W. B. Powell, 1941

Synonyms
- Allodiscus tessellata A. W. B. Powell, 1941

= Allodiscus tessellatus =

Species of land snail

Allodiscus tessellatus is a species of land snail belonging to the family Charopidae. Endemic to New Zealand, the species is found across the North Island and northern South Island in a range of forested and scrub habitats, often in association with rotting logs.

== Description ==
In the original description, Powell described the species as follows:

Shell small, depressed, openly umbilicated, thin, closely radially ribbed, 12 per millimeter, interstices minutely reticulated with close, microscopic radial lines and still finer and closer spiral striae. Spire 1/4 height of aperture. Whorls 4 1/4, including a typical lightly convex spirally striated protoconch of 1 3/4 whorls. Outline of whorls strongly and evenly convex. Aperture lunate. Base rounded, impressed towards an open circular umbilicus one twentieth the major diameter of the shell. Inner lip very little reflexed, scarcely encroaching upon the umbilicus. Colour pattern in the form of an even tessellated pattern of rectangular patches of reddish-brown upon a pale buff ground. A circular zone around the umbilicus is clear of colour markings. On the spire whorls there are three spiral series of tessellations.

The holotype of the species measures 2.3 mm (0.091 in) in height and 3.8 mm (0.15 in) in diameter, with some individuals reaching a diameter of up to 4.5 mm (0.18 in). The protoconch has 1.25-1.5 convex whorls, and is translucent buff in colour. The teleoconch has up to 2.75 convex whorls, and is translucent/white with a pattern on red-brown to yellow-brown axial marks of irregular width on spire.

== Taxonomy ==
The species was first described by A. W. B. Powell in 1941, using the name Allodiscus tessellata. The holotype was collected by A.E. Brookes at an unknown date prior to 1941, from near Rūātoki in the Bay of Plenty, at an elevation of 244 m (801 ft) above sea-level. The holotype is held by the Auckland War Memorial Museum.

== Distribution and habitat ==
The species is endemic to New Zealand, found across the North Island and on the northern South Island, in the Tasman and Marlborough districts, as well as Nelson. The species is found in a range of habitats, including podocarp, broafleaf and mixed broadleaf/podocarp forests, ranging from sea level to subalpine scrub up to an elevation of 1,560 m (5,120 ft) above sea-level. It is commonly found in association with leaf litter and wood debris, especially in areas with limestone soil, including the transitional zones of caves. The species is often found near rotten logs.

Fossils of the species dating to the Late Pleistocene and Holocene are known to occur in lake beds.

== Gallery ==
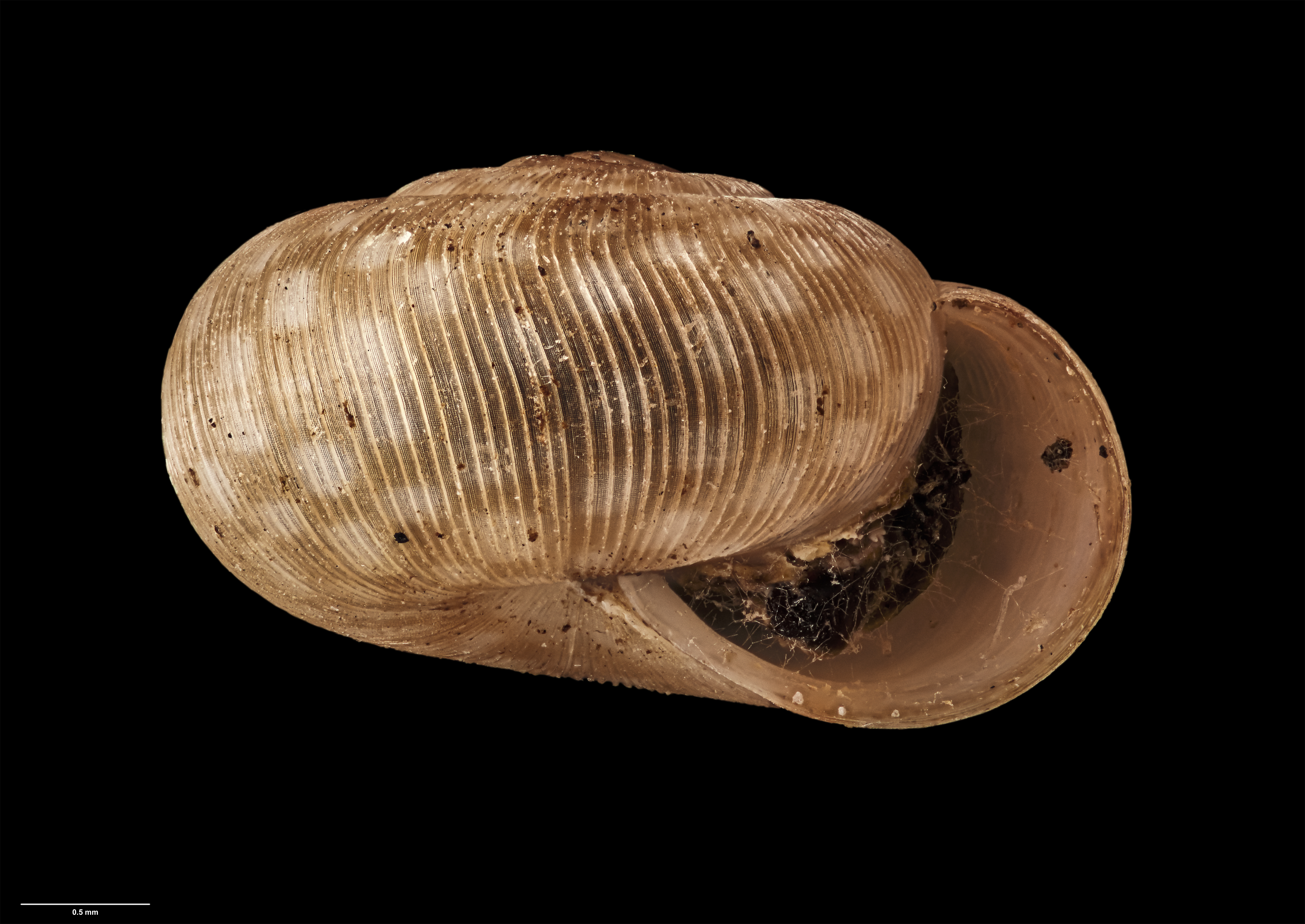
Side view of A. tessellatus holotype

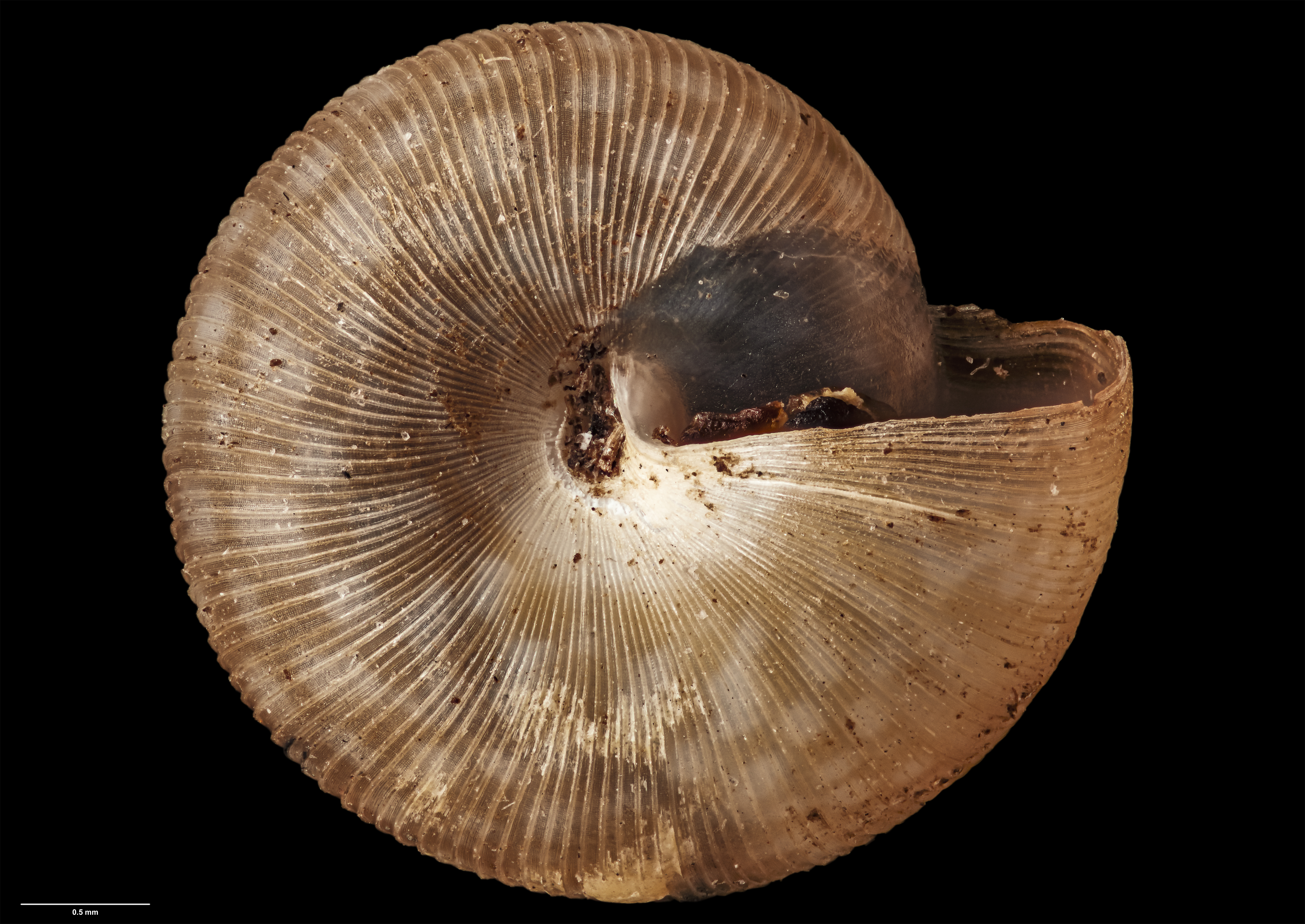
Underside view of A. tessellatus holotype
