= Whatuwhiwhi =

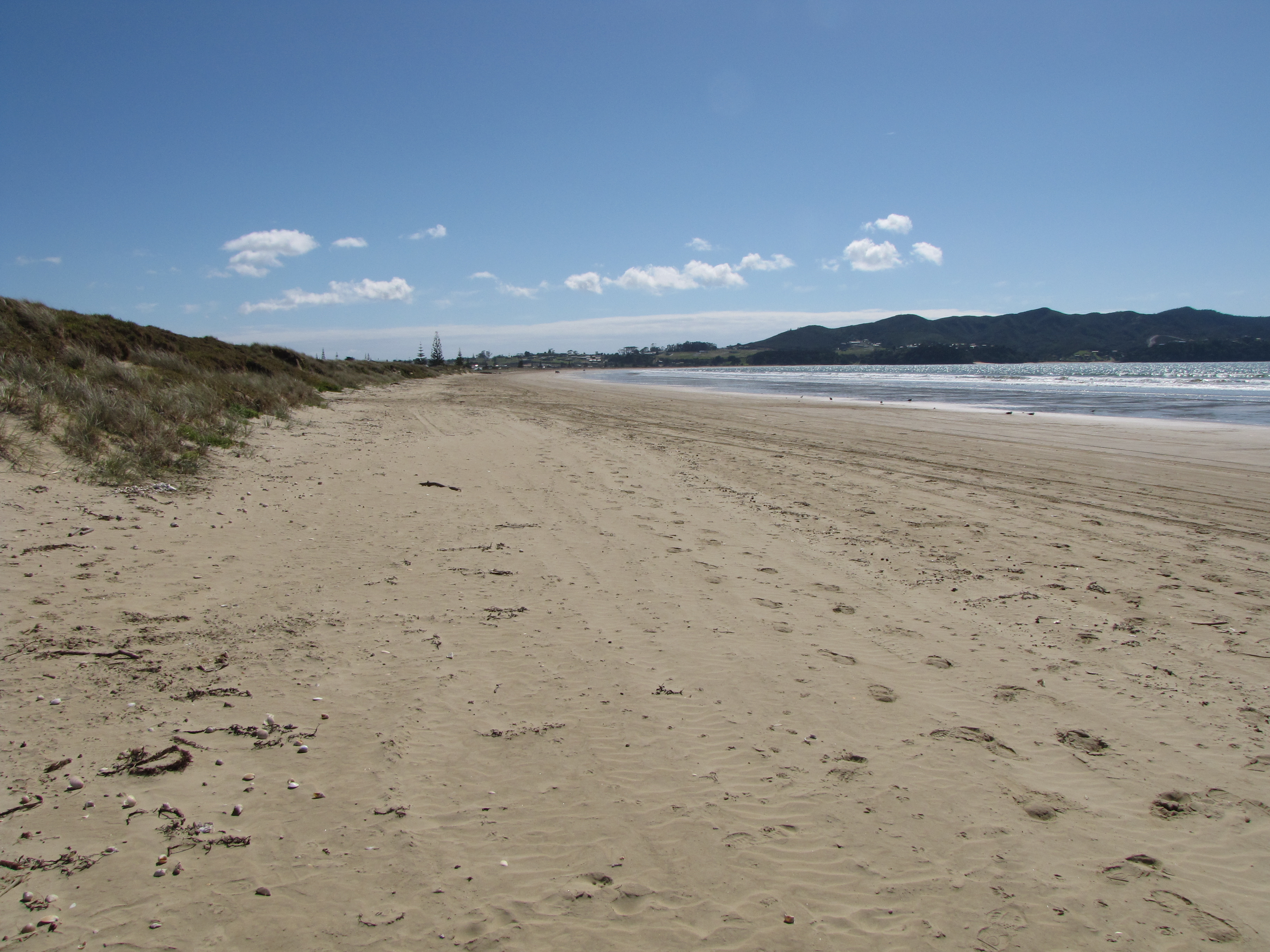
- Tokerau Beach, looking towards Whatuwhiwhi
- Interactive map of Whatuwhiwhi
- Coordinates: 34°52′30″S 173°23′24″E
- Country: New Zealand
- Region: Northland Region
- District: Far North District
- Ward: Te Hiku
- Community: Te Hiku
- Subdivision: Whatuwhiwhi
- Electorates: Northland; Te Tai Tokerau

Government
  - Territorial Authority: Far North District Council
  - Regional council: Northland Regional Council
  - Mayor of Far North: Moko Tepania
  - Northland MP: Grant McCallum
  - Te Tai Tokerau MP: Mariameno Kapa-Kingi

Area
  - Total: 6.66 km^{2} (2.57 sq mi)

Population (June 2025)
  - Total: 740
  - Density: 110/km^{2} (290/sq mi)

Whatuwhiwhi or Karikari is a settlement at the northern end of Tokerau Beach, on the Karikari Peninsula of Northland, New Zealand. To the south is Doubtless Bay.

Kaitaia is about 39 km away.

There are three shaded and sandy coves. Swimming is safe, but it is not a good anchorage because it is exposed to the south-east.

== de Surville ==
French explorer Jean-François-Marie de Surville and his crew in the ship St Jean Baptiste were the first Europeans to enter Doubtless Bay, just 8 days after James Cook had named it. They anchored off Rangiawhia Pa, just north east of Whatuwhiwhi, on 17 December 1769, and gathered cresses and green plants from the shore. Here Father Paul-Antoine Léonard de Villefeix (chaplain on the St Jean Baptiste) conducted the first Christian service in New Zealand waters when he celebrated Mass on Christmas Day 1769. A storm on 27 December stranded a party of men on shore at Whatuwhiwhi, where they were treated hospitably by the local Māori. In the same storm, the ship dragged her anchors, which had to be cut. The ship's yawl, which was in tow, struck rocks and was also cut free.

After the storm, and the stranded party had returned to the ship, on 31 December 1769, the yawl was spotted ashore on Tokerau Beach surrounded by Māori, and an armed party set off to retrieve it. They found a group of Māori carrying spears, and the chief, Ranginui, approached de Surville carrying a twig of green leaves as a sign of peace. De Surville arrested Ranginui for the theft of his boat. His party burned about 30 huts, destroyed one canoe filled with nets, and confiscated another. They brought Ranginui back to their ship, where the crew members who had been stranded during the storm identified him as the chief who had been hospitable to them. However, De Surville was determined to keep his captive, and St Jean Baptiste sailed for Peru the same day with Ranginui on board. He died of scurvy, 12 weeks later.

A plaque commemorating this visit was unveiled at Whatuwhiwhi in 1969. The anchors abandoned during the storm were located and raised in a community effort on 21 December 1974.

== Demographics ==
Statistics New Zealand describes Karikari, which corresponds to Whatuwhiwhi, as a rural settlement. It covers 6.66 km^{2} (2.57 sq mi) and had an estimated population of 740 as of June 2025, with a population density of 111 people per km^{2}. Whatuwhiwhi is part of the larger Karikari Peninsula statistical area.

Historical population
Year	Pop.	±% p.a.
2006	399	—
2013	471	+2.40%
2018	495	+1.00%
2023	696	+7.05%

Whatuwhiwhi had a population of 696 in the 2023 New Zealand census, an increase of 201 people (40.6%) since the 2018 census, and an increase of 225 people (47.8%) since the 2013 census. There were 342 males, and 351 females in 264 dwellings. 2.2% of people identified as LGBTIQ+. The median age was 49.4 years (compared with 38.1 years nationally). There were 129 people (18.5%) aged under 15 years, 81 (11.6%) aged 15 to 29, 291 (41.8%) aged 30 to 64, and 195 (28.0%) aged 65 or older.

People could identify as more than one ethnicity. The results were 62.5% European (Pākehā); 58.2% Māori; 6.5% Pasifika; 1.3% Asian; 0.4% Middle Eastern, Latin American and African New Zealanders (MELAA); and 0.9% other, which includes people giving their ethnicity as "New Zealander". English was spoken by 97.4%, Māori language by 19.8%, Samoan by 0.9% and other languages by 3.0%. No language could be spoken by 1.3% (e.g. too young to talk). New Zealand Sign Language was known by 0.9%. The percentage of people born overseas was 8.2, compared with 28.8% nationally.

Religious affiliations were 36.2% Christian, 3.4% Māori religious beliefs, and 0.4% other religions. People who answered that they had no religion were 48.7%, and 10.3% of people did not answer the census question.

Of those at least 15 years old, 54 (9.5%) people had a bachelor's or higher degree, 315 (55.6%) had a post-high school certificate or diploma, and 186 (32.8%) people exclusively held high school qualifications. The median income was $27,100, compared with $41,500 nationally. 33 people (5.8%) earned over $100,000 compared to 12.1% nationally. The employment status of those at least 15 was that 186 (32.8%) people were employed full-time, 66 (11.6%) were part-time, and 27 (4.8%) were unemployed.

== Education ==
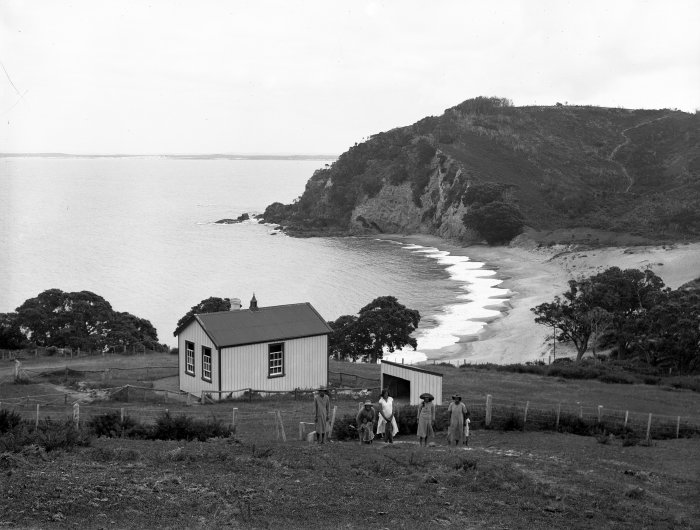
Rangiawhia Native School in about 1906

Rangiawhia Native School opened in Whatuwhiwhi on 27 January 1902. Wiremu Taua was the head teacher until 1919. This was an experiment to staff a Native School with Māori staff, and Taua was the first Māori person to become a head teacher. The school gained a reputation for excellence, and more Māori head teachers were appointed for native schools. The school gained new buildings in 1906. The average roll was 20 students. It no longer operates.

Te Kura Kaupapa Māori o Rangiawhia was a coeducational full primary school (years 1-8) which taught fully in the Māori language. It closed at the end of 2016.
