= Jean-François de Surville =

French explorer and merchant captain (1717–1770)

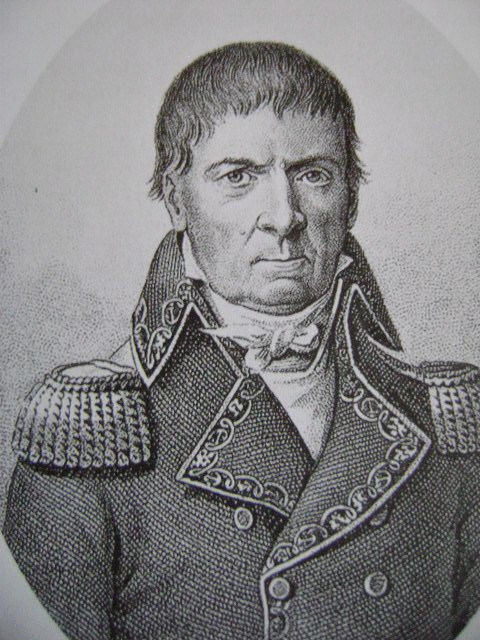
- Born: 18 January 1717; Port-Louis, Brittany, France
- Died: 8 April 1770 (aged 53); Chilca, Peru
- Cause of death: Drowning
- Occupations: Naval officer; merchant captain; explorer
- Known for: Exploration of the Pacific
- Spouse: Marie Jouaneaulx
- Children: 2
- Military career
- Allegiance: France
- Branch: French Navy
- Service years: 1740–1764
- Rank: Captain
- Commands: Bagatelle; Renommée; Duc de Orleans; La Fortuné
- Conflicts: War of the Austrian Succession; Seven Years' War
- Awards: Cross of Saint Louis

Jean-François Marie de Surville (18 January 1717 – 8 April 1770) was a merchant captain with the French East India Company. He commanded a voyage of exploration to the Pacific in 1769–70.

Born in the Province of Brittany in France, Surville joined the French East India Company in 1727 at the age of 10. For the next several years he sailed on voyages in Indian and Chinese waters. In 1740 he joined the French Navy; he fought in the War of the Austrian Succession and the Seven Years' War, twice becoming a prisoner of war. After his military career he rejoined the French East India Company. In 1769, in command of Saint Jean-Baptiste, he sailed from India on an expedition to the Pacific looking for trading opportunities. He explored the seas around the Solomon Islands and New Zealand before proceeding eastward across the South Pacific towards South America. Part of his route around New Zealand overlapped that of James Cook in Endeavour, which had preceded him by only a few days. De Surville drowned off the coast of Peru on 8 April 1770 while seeking help for his scurvy-afflicted crew.

== Early life ==
Born on 18 January 1717, Jean-François Marie de Surville was the son of Jean de Surville, a government official at Port-Louis, Brittany, and his wife, Françoise Mariteau de Roscadec, the daughter of a ship owner. One of nine children, Surville left home at the age of 10 and joined the French East India Company. There were existing family connections to the company; an older brother was already in its service and his mother was a niece of one of the company's directors. Surville's employer was a commercial enterprise supported by the French government and established several years previously to trade in the East Indies, and he sailed on trading voyages around India and China. By 1740 he held the rank of second ensign.

== Naval career ==
Following the outbreak of the War of the Austrian Succession in 1740, Surville joined the French Navy, and fought in that conflict. He sailed aboard Hercule as an ensign and became a prisoner of war in 1745, when the ship was captured by the Royal Navy off Sumatra. After his release in 1746, he served aboard Duc de Chartres, which shipped goods from France to West Africa, where it collected slaves for transportation to the Caribbean, and then molasses from the Caribbean to France, a process known as triangular trade. In 1747, Surville was given command of Bagatelle and a letter of marque, which entitled him to sail as a privateer for France. While on one of his sorties on Bagatelle, he was again captured by the Royal Navy and taken to England as a prisoner of war.

Released in 1748, Surville returned to the French East India Company as a first lieutenant aboard Duc de Béthune, a 40-gun merchantman that traversed the trading route to China. Returning to France in 1750, he married Marie Jouaneaulx at Nantes. The couple had two sons, who later joined the French Army. (Note: The elder son reached the rank of captain in the Artois Regiment and died childless. The younger son died of wounds received at the siege of Pondicherry in 1778.) He spent the next few years on trading voyages around the French ports in the Indian Ocean and during this time, acquired a farm on the island of Réunion.

By 1753, Surville was commander of Renommée and had made the acquaintance of Marion Dufresne, who would later become known for his voyages to the Pacific. During the Seven Years' War, which began in August 1756, Surville returned to active duty with the French Navy and sailed with the Comte d'Aché's naval fleet in the Indian Ocean as commander of Duc de Orleans. He was looked upon favourably by his superiors for his seamanship and leadership, and was made an "officer of the blue", a title used for non-aristocratic officers.

Surville was present at the Battle of Cuddalore in 1758 and was wounded the following year at the Battle of Pondicherry. He was awarded the Cross of Saint Louis for his conduct during the fighting. He ended the Seven Years' War as commander of La Fortuné, a 64-gun warship. While transporting soldiers back to France, he encountered bad weather off the coast of South Africa. The ship developed leaks and was wrecked near Cape Town. Surville was able to get all the crew and passengers safely to shore and on to Cape Town. This delayed his return to France until early 1764.

== French India ==
Surville resumed service with the French East India Company in 1765 and later that year commanded Duc de Praslin on its voyage transporting the new governor of Pondicherry, Jean Law de Lauriston, to India. Afterwards, together with Lauriston and Jean-Baptiste Chevalier, the governor of Chandernagore – which, like Pondicherry, was a French settlement on the east coast of India – Surville set up a venture to pursue trading in the Indian Ocean. Returning to France in 1766, Surville gained the approval of the French East India Company for his commercial plans. Needing a ship for his venture, he supervised the construction of Saint Jean-Baptiste, a large merchantman armed with 36 guns, at Port-Louis. He sailed her to India in June 1767. Over the next several months, Surville made a series of trading voyages along the Indian coast. He also served as deputy governor of Pondicherry.

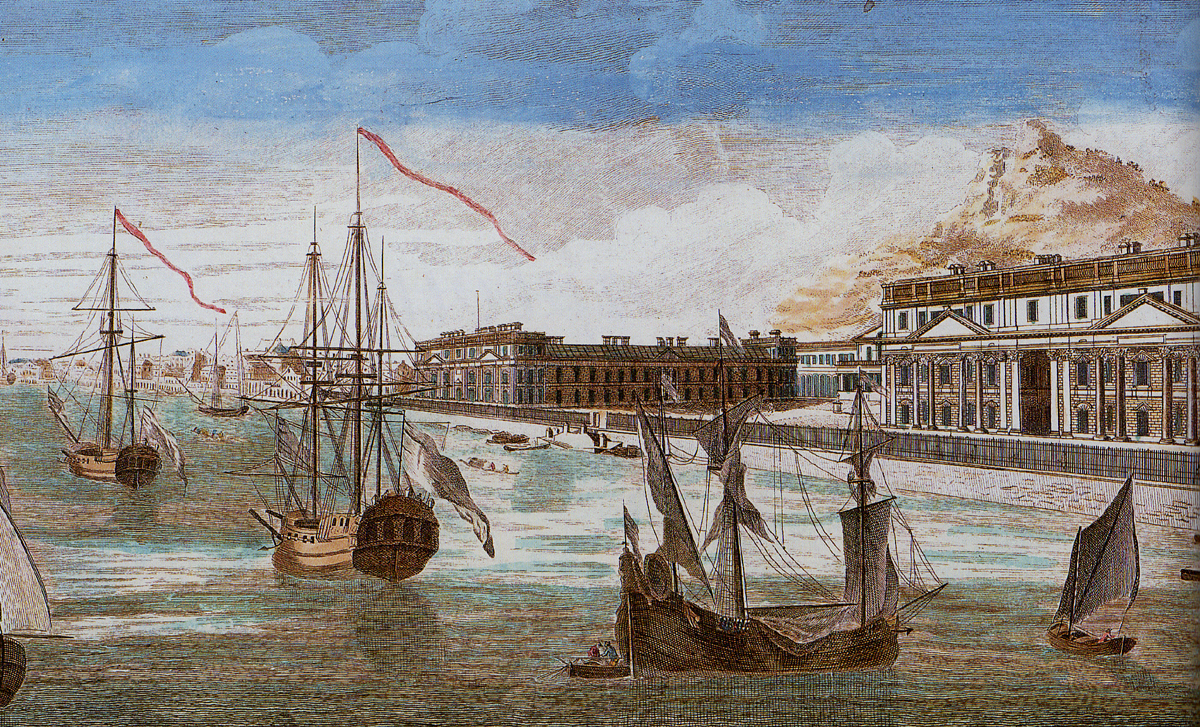
A view of Pondicherry in the late 18th century

By late 1768, the French East India Company was undergoing severe financial difficulties, and its monopoly on trade in the East Indies was threatened with revocation. Surville and his business associates recognised that this would represent new opportunities for their syndicate and were planning a commercial expedition to the Philippines. At about this time, they became aware of rumours of a recent British discovery of land in the South Pacific, believed to be the fabulously wealthy island of Davis Land. These rumours were based on HMS Dolphin's reports of Tahiti.

Davis Land represented a potentially important trading possibility for Surville's syndicate, but it was also necessary to establish a French foothold in the South Pacific before the British did, lest they be locked out of the region. Consequently, it was decided that Surville would mount an expedition to the South Pacific. The plan was for Surville to sail Saint Jean-Baptiste to Malacca, and then on to the South China Sea and the Philippines. He was then to traverse the north and south latitudes of the Pacific, searching for Davis Land. The latter objective was to be kept secret, even from the officers of the expedition. On his return, Surville was to stop at Manila and Batavia. To avoid British suspicion as to the purpose of the expedition, the official destinations of the Saint Jean-Baptiste were Manila and Canton.

After more than two months of preparation, Surville departed from Chandernagore aboard Saint Jean-Baptiste on 3 March 1769, carrying a mixture of trading goods as cargo. These goods, if not able to be traded to the Jewish merchants believed to live on Davis Land, were to be sold at Manila on the expedition's return voyage, to improve its profitability. Also on board were several charts and narratives of voyages to the Pacific, including an account of Abel Tasman's 1642 journey to New Zealand. After visits to French settlements along the Indian coast to pick up provisions, Surville made his last stop at Pondicherry, where he added some grenadiers to the expedition's complement. The expedition, now numbering 172 men, departed on 22 June 1769.

== Exploring the Pacific ==
The route of Surville's ship Saint Jean-Baptiste

Surville sailed first to the Nicobar Islands to try to verify the presence of a Danish colony but encountered adverse winds by the time the islands were in sight. Rather than spend time maneuvering into a more favourable position for the wind, he proceeded to Malacca, arriving on 29 June 1769. An initially warm welcome from the Dutch governor soon cooled when another ship, a British vessel, arrived with allegations that the French were headed to the East Indies, where the Dutch had a monopoly. Surville promptly left, sailing to Terengganu on the Malay Peninsula and then to the islands of the Bashi Channel, between Taiwan and the Philippines, where he stocked up on water and food. Several of his crew deserted and, unable to locate them, Surville kidnapped some of the Bashi islanders as replacements for the missing men.

To the surprise of the majority of the expedition, Surville then sailed to the southeast, away from the ship's official destination of Canton, in accordance with his secret instructions to locate Davis Land. Proceeding to the Solomon Islands, which had not been sighted by Europeans since their discovery in 1568, the expedition's company began to suffer from scurvy. They reached the coast of Santa Isabel, in the Solomons, on 7 October 1769. At their first anchorage, which Surville named "Port Praslin", they received a hostile reception. Hoping to find fresh food to help those afflicted with scurvy, a party went ashore but was attacked by the locals. Several French were wounded, one fatally, and over 35 islanders were killed. The expedition then tried for another anchorage, but were unable to conduct any trade or resupply their ship without being attacked by hostile islanders.

By this time, Saint Jean-Baptiste was short of fresh food and many of Surville's crew had died from scurvy. Morale was low, not helped by the poor condition of the ship, which was leaking. Surville was forced to find a safe anchorage, but was unwilling to risk stopping at the Solomon Islands again. Instead, after consulting Tasman's charts, in mid-November he headed for New Zealand. To avoid missing landfall due to errors in longitude, he first sailed southwest across the Coral Sea, before turning eastwards at the latitude of northern New Zealand. For much of his course to the south, he was roughly parallel with the coast of Australia and, before turning to the east, it is likely that he came close to reaching and discovering the coast of what is now New South Wales. Several birds were seen and his crew reported that they could smell land, but he continued with his change of course regardless.

=== New Zealand ===
The route of Saint Jean-Baptiste around the far north of New Zealand in December 1769. The route of Endeavour is also shown. The dates indicated are those from the logs of the respective vessels, which differed by at least one day due to different timekeeping methods and the port of origin.

On 12 December 1769 at 11:15 am, Saint Jean-Baptiste sighted the coast of New Zealand and sailed to just off Hokianga, on the west coast of the northern part of the North Island. Finding the shore inhospitable, Surville sailed northwards. On 16 December, the ship rounded North Cape and, heading south, passed through the area that James Cook's Endeavour had traversed one or two days earlier. (Note: There is uncertainty as to the respective positions of Saint Jean-Baptiste and Endeavour at this time. In their journals, both Surville and Cook used nautical dates, where the day begins at noon, but those on the ships also used civil dates, where the day commenced at midnight. Cook, having sailed westward from Cape Horn, had crossed 180° longitude, now the International Dateline, but did not advance the date, while Surville had not crossed 180° longitude, having sailed from India.) Surville and Cook were the first Europeans to navigate New Zealand waters since Abel Tasman's voyage 127 years earlier.

Sailing down the east coast, Surville reached what he called "Lauriston Bay" on 17 December 1769. Cook had already named it "Doubtless Bay" when he sailed past it less than two weeks earlier. Māori in canoes went out to Saint Jean-Baptiste and engaged in some trading for fresh fish, allaying fears of the crew who were aware Tasman had experienced a hostile welcome on his arrival in New Zealand. Surville then took his ship deeper into the bay, anchoring late in the day off Tokerau Beach near Whatuwhiwhi.

Surville, along with some sailors and soldiers, went ashore the next day. The party was greeted by a Māori chief, who showed them to a source of water, and gave them cresses and celery. Over the next several days, the fresh food gathered or traded from the Māori helped the majority of the sick among the expedition to recover from their scurvy. It is likely that Father Paul-Antoine Léonard de Villefeix, the chaplain on Saint Jean-Baptiste, conducted the first Christian service in New Zealand and may have celebrated mass on Christmas Day 1769. If so, this would predate Reverend Samuel Marsden's service of Christmas Day in 1814, generally held to be the first religious service in New Zealand.

Some actions of the French may have caused offence to the Māori. Surville attached a white ostrich feather to a chief's head, considered highly tapu. The bodies of those who died from scurvy in the bay were thrown overboard, which would have contaminated the fishery, leading to the Māori (if they were aware) placing a rāhui or temporary prohibition on fishing in the area. The Māori may have been concerned about the amount of food that the French were taking and, in consequence, trading for fish and celery soon ceased. This led to a deterioration of relations between the French and Māori. Surville, having initially taken care to be as congenial as possible towards the Māori, was becoming increasingly frustrated.

On 27 December, a storm stranded a party of men on shore at Whatuwhiwhi, where they were treated hospitably by the Māori. In the same storm, the ship dragged her anchors, which had to be cut on Surville's orders. He and part of the crew spent several hours trying to bring the Saint Jean-Baptiste to a more sheltered anchorage. The ship's yawl, which was in tow, struck rocks and had to be cut free. After the storm passed, the stranded party returned to the ship, which had suffered a broken tiller. Surville, distressed by the loss of the anchors and the yawl, which jeopardised plans for further exploration of the area, went ashore with a party of two officers and some sailors to fish on 30 December. The party was invited to a village by a local chief and shared a meal before returning to the ship.

The following day, 31 December, an officer spotted the yawl ashore on Tokerau Beach surrounded by Māori, and an armed party set off from Saint Jean-Baptiste to retrieve it. Surville considered the yawl to have been stolen; by tradition, any flotsam washed ashore belonged to the chief of the area. Reaching the beach, the French party found a group of Māori carrying spears, but there was no sign of the yawl. Their chief, Ranginui, (Note: In later accounts of the expedition, the French ascribed the chief the name "Naguinoui" or "Naquinovi".) approached Surville carrying a twig of green leaves, a sign of peace in Māori culture. His patience exhausted, Surville arrested Ranginui for the theft of his yawl. His party burned about 30 huts, destroyed a canoe filled with nets, and confiscated another canoe. They brought Ranginui back to their ship, where the crew members who had been stranded during the storm identified him as the chief who had been hospitable to them. Surville was determined to keep his captive, and Saint Jean-Baptiste departed eastwards that day with Ranginui on board.

=== Voyage to South America ===
Surville, after having consulted with his officers and considering the poor condition of his ship and crew, rejected sailing north to the Philippines or the Dutch East Indies, and instead decided to sail eastwards for South America. This route took advantage of favourable winds, and offered the lucrative prospect of discovering previously unknown lands as they moved eastwards. Surville privately remained hopeful of locating Davis Land. The Spanish considered their ports along the Pacific coast of South America off limits to other nations and there was a risk the French would be imprisoned upon arrival. It was hoped that the existing alliance between France and Spain and an appeal on humanitarian grounds would avert that possibility.

Initially sailing along the southern latitudes of 34° and 35°, the expedition continued to suffer losses to scurvy, with the first death since departing New Zealand occurring on 19 February 1770. Surville soon turned his ship towards 27° south, the latitude on which Davis Land was believed to lie. Early the following month, with water supplies low, Surville conceded defeat in his quest for the island and set course for Peru after consulting with his officers. On 24 March, as the ship approached the Juan Fernández Islands, Ranginui died of scurvy. Although initially distressed at being kidnapped, he had been well treated and had regularly dined with Surville.

Rather than stop at the Juan Fernández Islands for supplies, Surville chose to continue to Peru, only 400 miles (640 kilometres) away. Saint Jean-Baptiste reached the settlement of Chilca, on the Peruvian coast, on 7 April. An attempt to land a party was made that afternoon, but the sea conditions were too hazardous. The next day, Surville, in full ceremonial dress, and three crew members departed in a small boat to seek help from the Spanish viceroy at Chilca. In poor conditions, the boat capsized and Surville and two others were drowned. His body was found by locals and was buried at Chilca.

In the meantime, Saint Jean-Baptiste had been sailed north to the port of Callao, in accordance with Surville's instructions in the event he not return to the ship. Surville's uniform, Cross of Saint Louis, and a lock of his hair were handed over to Guillaume Labè, the ship's first officer. The Spanish authorities impounded Saint Jean-Baptiste and detained her surviving crew for over two years before allowing them to return to France. On 20 August 1773, when the ship arrived at Port-Louis, only 66 of the original complement of 173 men had completed Surville's expedition; 79 had died through sickness or attacks by hostile islanders, and another 28 had deserted. (Note: Two of these deserters were the chaplain, Villefeix, and Surville's nephew. Both had left to prospect for gold while Saint Jean-Baptiste was detained at Callao.) Saint Jean-Baptiste still carried the goods it had taken on board at Pondicherry, and these were sold to allow the expedition's investors to recover some of their contributions. Surville's widow was granted a pension by the King of France, Louis XV. She also received Surville's possessions, handed over by Labè.

== Legacy ==
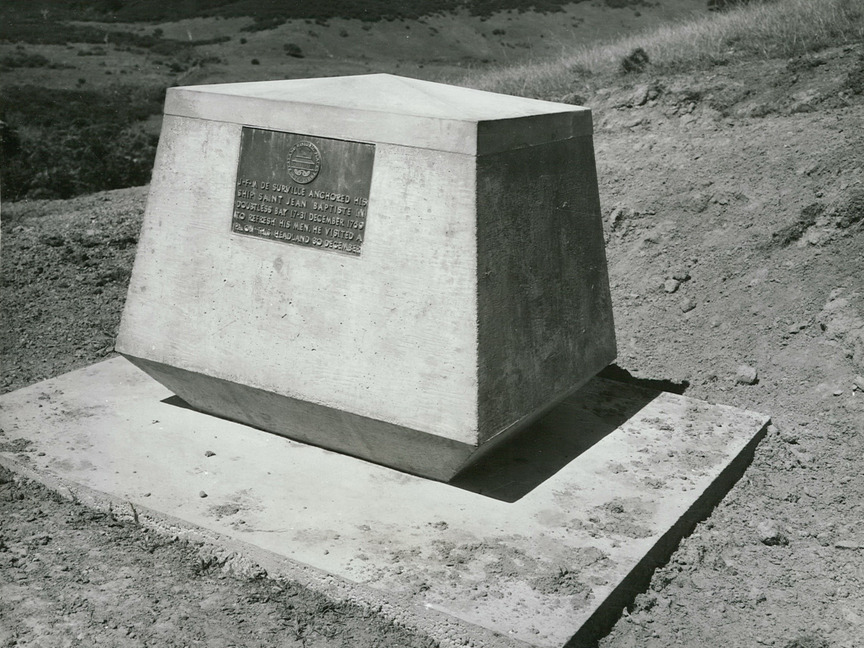
A commemorative plaque marking the anchorage of Saint Jean-Baptiste at Doubtless Bay, in New Zealand. It reads: "Jean François Marie de Surville anchored his ship Saint Jean Baptiste in Doubtless Bay 17–31 December 1769 to refresh his men. He visited a pā on this headland, 30 December."

Despite being commercially unsuccessful, Surville's voyage allowed geographers of the time to confirm the size of the Solomon Islands and New Caledonia, and the likely non-existence of Davis Land. It provided further evidence that there was no Terra Australis to be found in the South Pacific, and also contributed more knowledge of New Zealand and its inhabitants. Surville and his men were the first Europeans to cross the Coral Sea and make a west–east traverse of the temperate zone of the South Pacific, an important route for future explorers in the area.

A street in Surville's home town of Port-Louis is named for him. He is remembered in New Zealand through the naming of the Surville Cliffs, the northernmost point of mainland New Zealand. Cap Surville was the original name for what is now known as North Cape. A plaque commemorating Surville's visit to the area 200 years earlier was laid at Whatuwhiwhi in 1969. Two of the anchors of Saint Jean-Baptiste that were lost at Doubtless Bay were discovered in 1974 and are displayed at the Far North Regional Museum at Kaitaia and the Museum of New Zealand Te Papa Tongarewa in Wellington respectively. A third anchor lost at Doubtless Bay was discovered in 1982 by Kelly Tarlton, but knowledge of its location were disappeared on his death three years later. The anchor was rediscovered again by Brendan Wade in July 2025.
