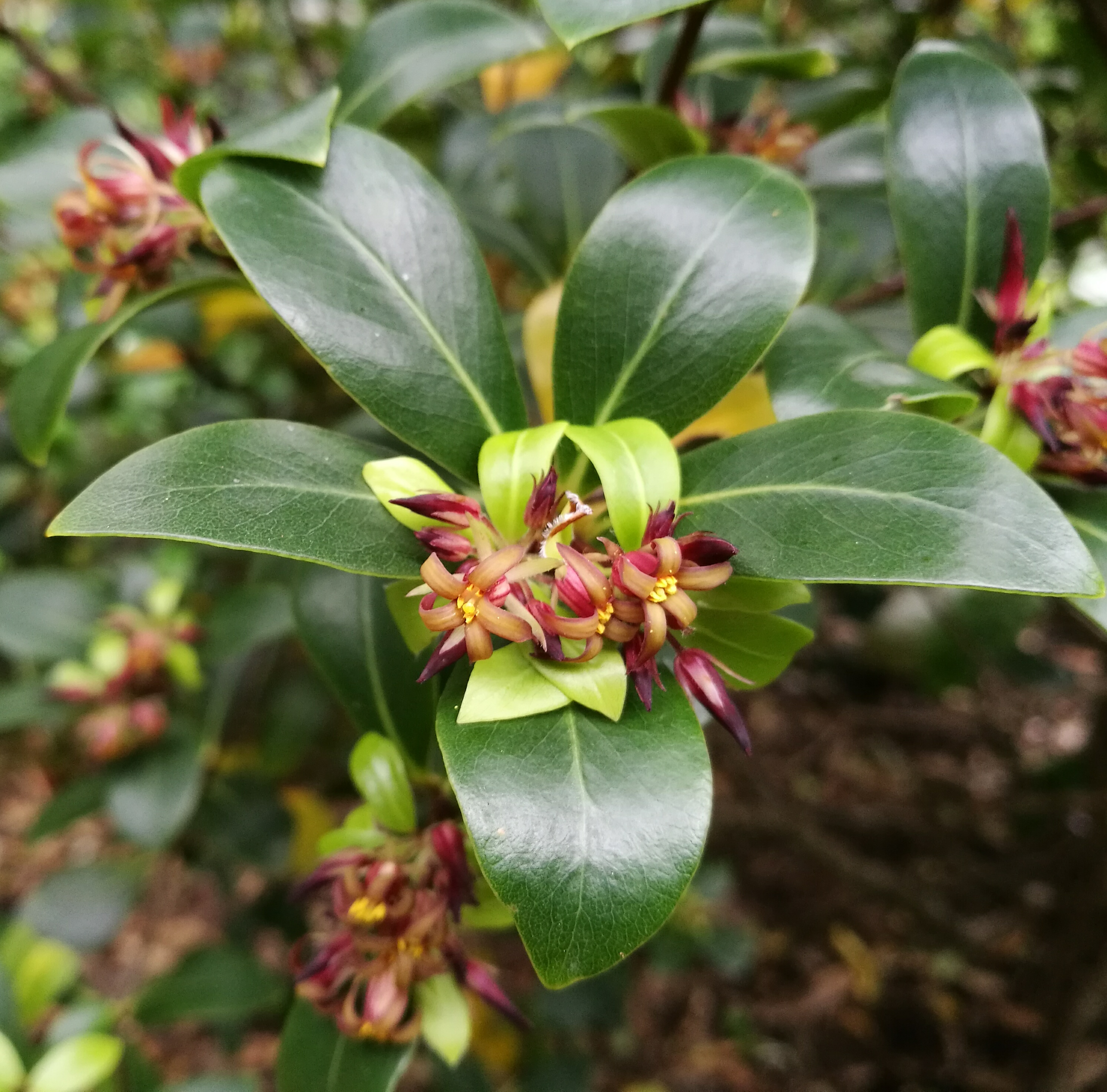
- P. cornifolium at Percy Scenic Reserve

Scientific classification
- Kingdom: Plantae
- Clade: Tracheophytes
- Clade: Angiosperms
- Clade: Eudicots
- Clade: Asterids
- Order: Apiales
- Family: Pittosporaceae
- Genus: Pittosporum
- Species: P. cornifolium

Binomial name
- Pittosporum cornifolium A.Cunn. ex Hook.

= Pittosporum cornifolium =

Species of flowering plant

Pittosporum cornifolium, known as tāwhiri karo in Māori, is a species of plant in the Pittosporaceae family. It is an epiphytic plant endemic to the North Island and the Marlborough Sounds of the South Island, New Zealand. In the wild it is considered rare and threatened, although it occurs more frequently on offshore islands in the north-east, along with P. kirkii, the only other epiphytic member of the genus. Also grows well as a ground plant and is a popular garden ornamental with two recognised cultivars.

== Description and habitat ==
Pittosporum cornifolium is an attractive hanging plant or shrub growing to 2 metres (6 feet 7 inches) tall, with leaves which are shiny dark green, arranged in wide verticils or whorls. Reddish buds appear over the top of the verticils, producing yellow fragrant flowers usually in late winter. The fruit opens to reveal black seeds highlighted by the orange coloured pith covering the internal surface of the capsule, attracting birds. Naturally occurring plants grow with other epiphytes often in large pūriri and rātā trees, and occasionally in rock crevices.
