= Étouars =

- Commune
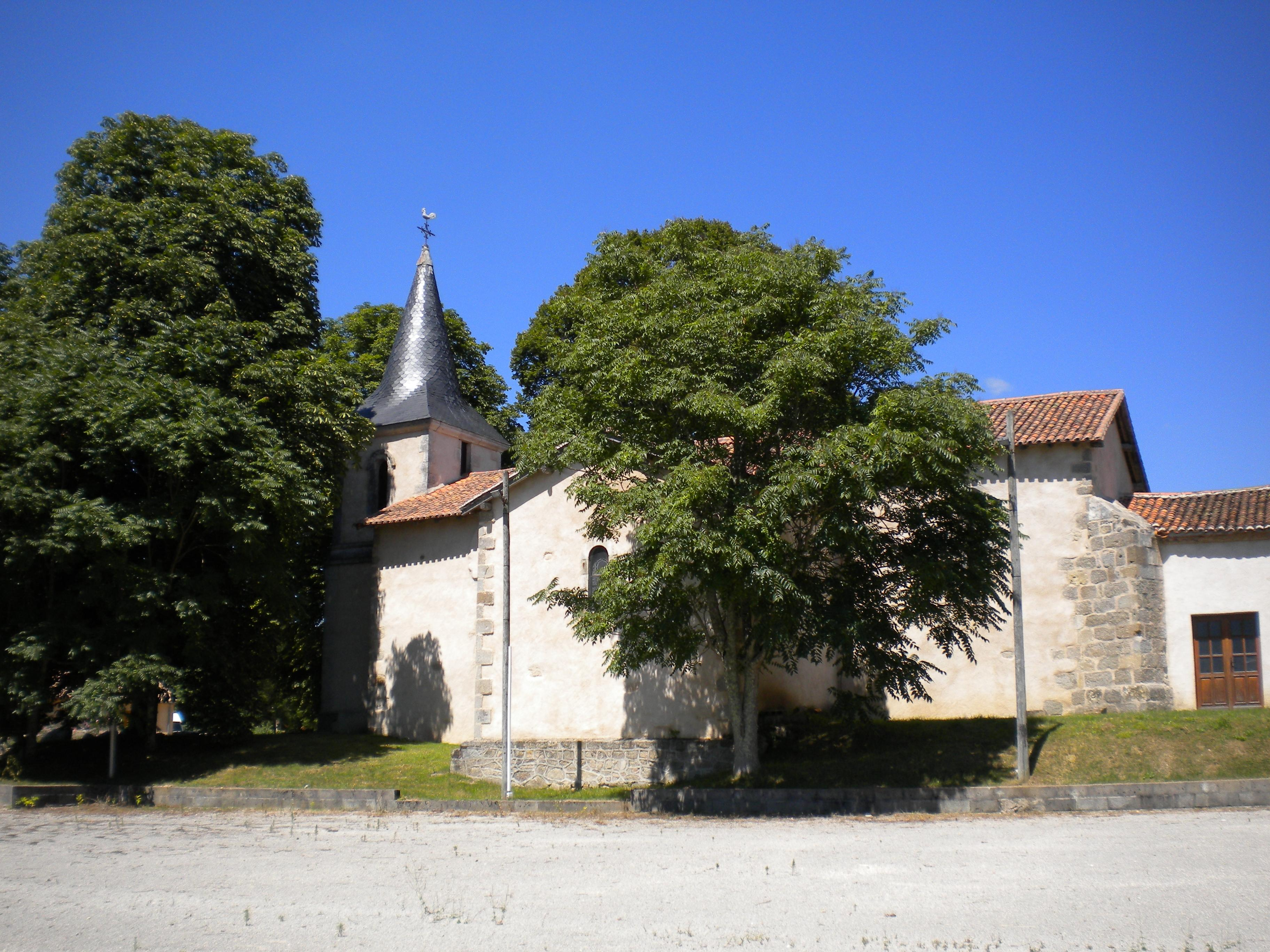
- The church in Étouars
- Location of Étouars
- Location within France Location within Nouvelle-Aquitaine
- Coordinates: 45°36′09″N 0°37′45″E
- Country: France
- Region: Nouvelle-Aquitaine
- Department: Dordogne
- Arrondissement: Nontron
- Canton: Périgord Vert Nontronnais

Government
  - Mayor (2020–2026): Francine Bernard
- Area^{1}: 7.83 km^{2} (3.02 sq mi)
- Elevation: 272 m (892 ft)
- Highest elevation: 277 m (909 ft)
- Lowest elevation: 170 m (560 ft)
- Population (2023): 166
  - Density: 21.2/km^{2} (54.9/sq mi)
- Time zone: UTC+01:00 (CET)
  - Summer (DST): UTC+02:00 (CEST)
- INSEE/Postal code: 24163 /24360
- ^{1} French Land Register data, which excludes lakes, ponds, glaciers > 1 km^{2} (0.386 sq mi or 247 acres) and river estuaries.

Étouars is a commune in the Dordogne department in Nouvelle-Aquitaine in southwestern France.

== Population ==
Historical population
| Year | Pop. | ±% p.a. |
|---|---|---|
| 1968 | 220 | — |
| 1975 | 195 | −1.71% |
| 1982 | 197 | +0.15% |
| 1990 | 174 | −1.54% |
| 1999 | 175 | +0.06% |
| 2007 | 147 | −2.16% |
| 2012 | 146 | −0.14% |
| 2017 | 155 | +1.20% |
| 2023 | 166 | +1.15% |
Source: INSEE

== See also ==
- Communes of the Dordogne department
