= Wīwī =

Wīwī is a common name for several species of New Zealand rushes and sedges whose individual plants grow as a clump with wire-like stems. The name wīwī or wiwi has been adopted in English from the Māori language.

- Ficinia nodosa, knobby club-rush, a sedge native to New Zealand, Australia and South Africa
- Juncus australis, austral rush, native to New Zealand and Australia
- Juncus edgariae, Edgar's rush, endemic to New Zealand
- Juncus kraussii, sea rush, native to New Zealand, Australia, South America and southern Africa
- Juncus pallidus, giant rush, native to New Zealand and Australia
- Juncus sarophorus, broom rush, native to New Zealand and Australia

The name wīwī is sometimes used for a tussock grass with narrow wire-like leaves, though wī is more usual for this.

- Poa cita, silver tussock, a tussock grass endemic to New Zealand
