= Karikari Peninsula =

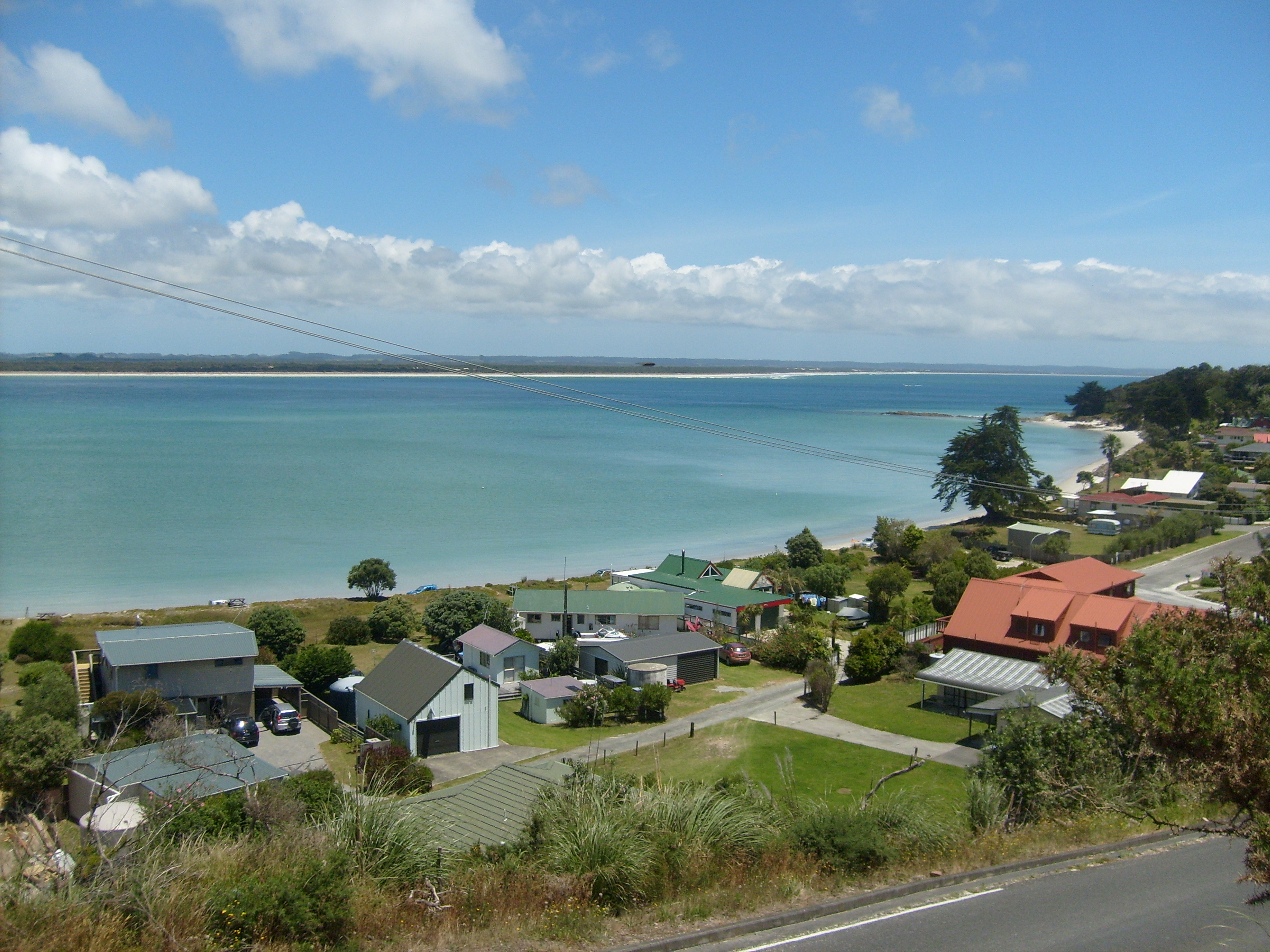
- Rangaunu harbour and Rangiputa settlement
- Interactive map of Karikari Peninsula
- Coordinates: 34°51′0″S 173°25′0″E
- Country: New Zealand
- Region: Northland Region
- District: Far North District
- Ward: Te Hiku
- Community: Te Hiku
- Subdivision: Whatuwhiwhi

Government
  - Territorial Authority: Far North District Council
  - Regional council: Northland Regional Council
  - Mayor of Far North: Moko Tepania
  - Northland MP: Grant McCallum
  - Te Tai Tokerau MP: Mariameno Kapa-Kingi

Area
  - Total: 174.44 km^{2} (67.35 sq mi)

Population (June 2025)
  - Total: 1,740
  - Density: 9.97/km^{2} (25.8/sq mi)

The Karikari Peninsula on the east coast of the far north of Northland, New Zealand, is between Rangaunu Harbour to the west, Rangaunu Bay to the north-west and Doubtless Bay to the east. It is a right-angled land mass of two relatively distinct parts. The rocky northern part, which has an east–west orientation and is approximately 17 km long, was originally an island but is now connected to the mainland by a low sandy tombolo approximately 11 km long, which has a north–south orientation.

== History and culture ==
The local iwi are Ngāti Kahu. In Māori mythology, the waka Waipapa, captained by Kaiwhetu and Wairere, made its first landing in New Zealand at Karikari. Pūwheke hill in the north-western bay was used by Māori as a navigation landmark and vantage point.

The two largest settlements are Whatuwhiwhi, on the south side of the north-eastern part of the peninsula, and nearby Tokerau Beach, which lies at the northern end of the eastern side of the sandy strip. Maitai Bay (formerly called Matai Bay) on the northeast coast and Rangiputa on the west coast are popular tourist destinations.

The tombolo once had kauri forests, but in the 1960s the only vegetation was short scrub, some gorse and wīwī (rushes). Grapes are grown on the northern side of Karikari.

The Karikari Peninsula has two marae affiliated with Ngāti Kahu hapū. Haiti-tai-marangai Marae and meeting house are affiliated with Te Rorohuri / Te Whānau Moana. Werowero Marae is affiliated with Ngāti Tara ki Werowero.

== Demographics ==
Karikari Peninsula covers 174.44 km^{2} (67.35 sq mi) and had an estimated population of 1,740 as of June 2025, with a population density of 10.0 people per km^{2}.

Historical population
Year	Pop.	±% p.a.
2006	942	—
2013	1,164	+3.07%
2018	1,251	+1.45%
2023	1,686	+6.15%

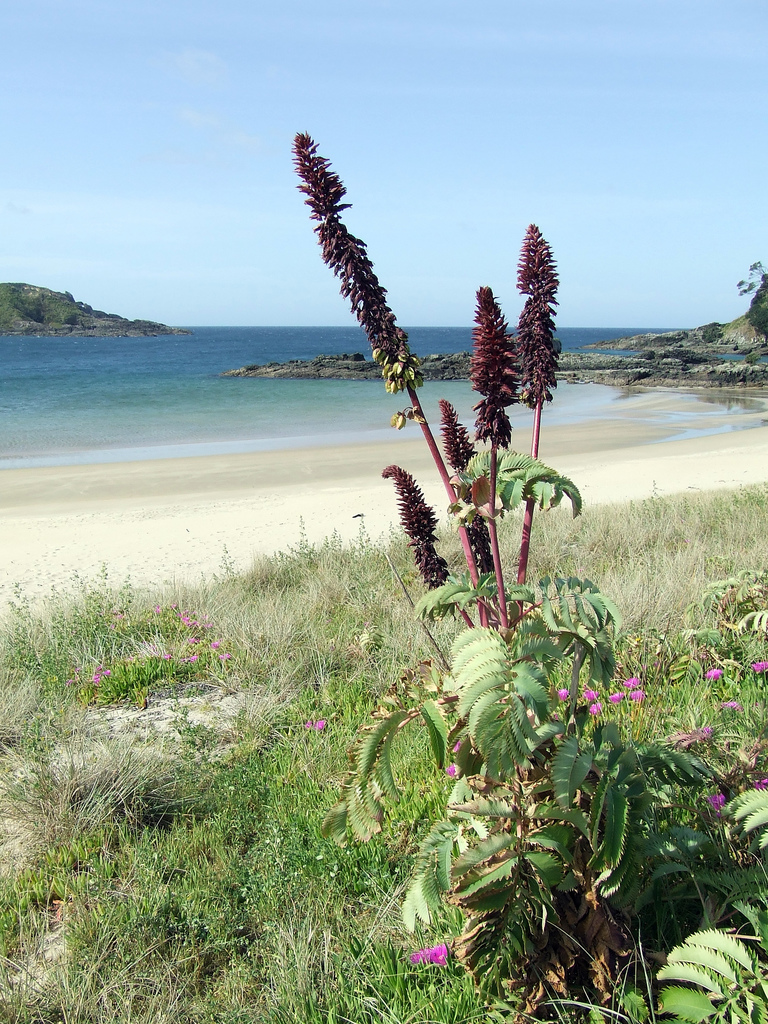
Cape honey flower (Melianthus major), a poisonous introduced weed, growing at Maitai Bay

Karikari Peninsula had a population of 1,686 in the 2023 New Zealand census, an increase of 435 people (34.8%) since the 2018 census, and an increase of 522 people (44.8%) since the 2013 census. There were 840 males, and 846 females in 648 dwellings. 1.8% of people identified as LGBTIQ+. The median age was 50.8 years (compared with 38.1 years nationally). There were 288 people (17.1%) aged under 15 years, 210 (12.5%) aged 15 to 29, 720 (42.7%) aged 30 to 64, and 468 (27.8%) aged 65 or older.

People could identify as more than one ethnicity. The results were 70.6% European (Pākehā); 48.0% Māori; 4.6% Pasifika; 1.4% Asian; 0.4% Middle Eastern, Latin American and African New Zealanders (MELAA); and 2.5% other, which includes people giving their ethnicity as "New Zealander". English was spoken by 97.5%, Māori language by 14.1%, Samoan by 0.7% and other languages by 3.7%. No language could be spoken by 1.1% (e.g. too young to talk). New Zealand Sign Language was known by 0.7%. The percentage of people born overseas was 9.4, compared with 28.8% nationally.

Religious affiliations were 32.9% Christian, 2.8% Māori religious beliefs, 0.2% Buddhist, 0.5% New Age, 0.2% Jewish, and 0.7% other religions. People who answered that they had no religion were 53.4%, and 9.3% of people did not answer the census question.

Of those at least 15 years old, 147 (10.5%) people had a bachelor's or higher degree, 801 (57.3%) had a post-high school certificate or diploma, and 414 (29.6%) people exclusively held high school qualifications. The median income was $28,500, compared with $41,500 nationally. 78 people (5.6%) earned over $100,000 compared to 12.1% nationally. The employment status of those at least 15 was that 525 (37.6%) people were employed full-time, 174 (12.4%) were part-time, and 51 (3.6%) were unemployed.
