= Broadwood, New Zealand =

Broadwood
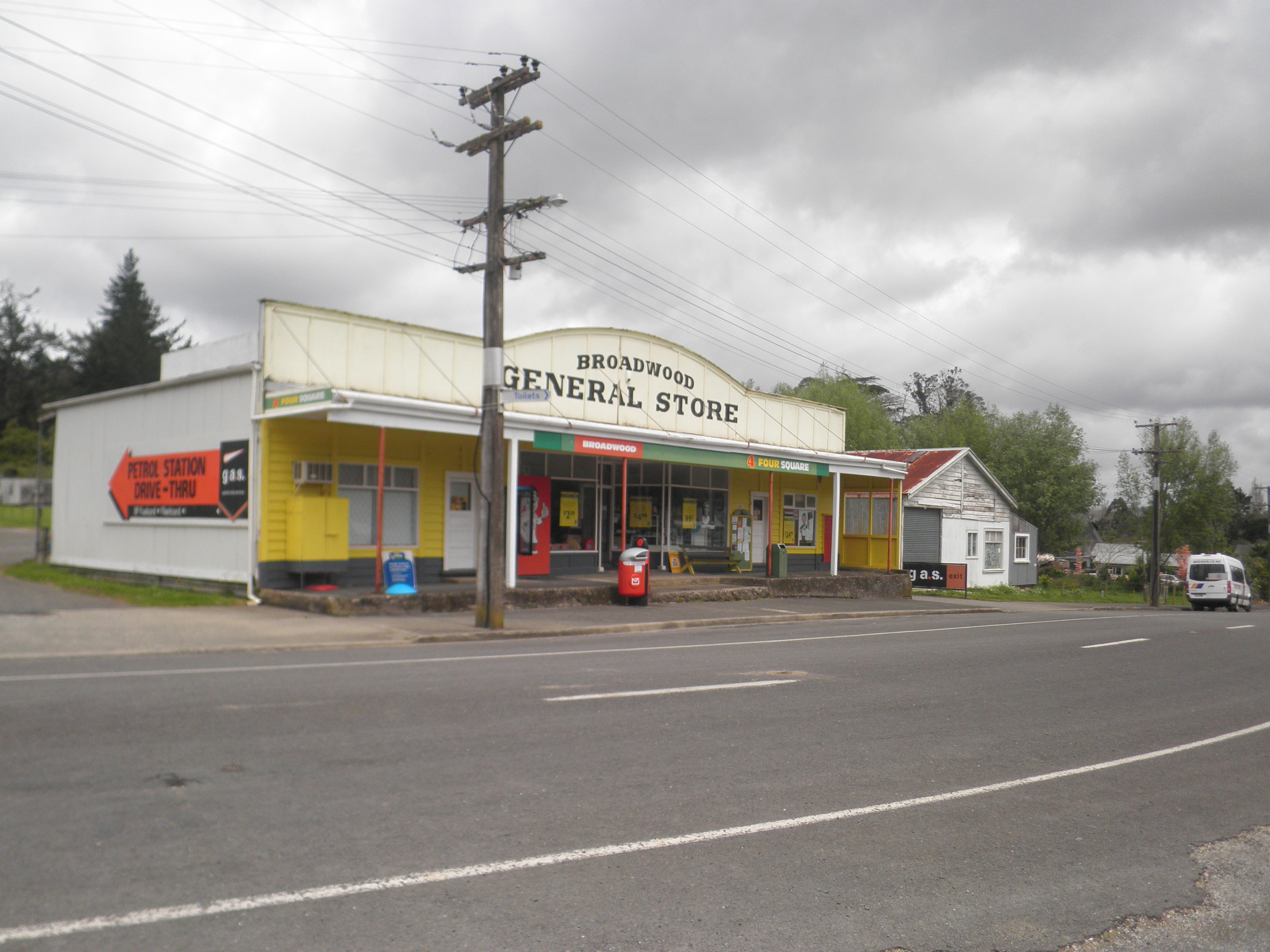
- Broadwood General Store
- Interactive map of Broadwood
- Coordinates: 35°15′38″S 173°23′36″E
- Country: New Zealand
- Region: Northland Region
- District: Far North District
- Ward: Kaikohe/Hokianga
- Community: Kaikohe-Hokianga
- Subdivision: North Hokianga
- Electorates: Northland; Te Tai Tokerau

Government
  - Territorial Authority: Far North District Council
  - Regional council: Northland Regional Council
  - Mayor of Far North: Moko Tepania
  - Northland MP: Grant McCallum
  - Te Tai Tokerau MP: Mariameno Kapa-Kingi

Area
  - Total: 80.90 km^{2} (31.24 sq mi)

Population (2023 Census)
  - Total: 132
  - Density: 1.63/km^{2} (4.23/sq mi)

Broadwood is a town about 25 km to the north of the north side of the Hokianga harbour, in Northland, New Zealand. Herekino is 21 km to the west, and Mangamuka Bridge is the same distance to the east.

The Broadwood area was first settled by Pākehā in the 1880s, and an access road was constructed through the area from Takahue to Motukaraka on the Hokianga harbour. An unmetalled road through the Te Karae Valley to Kohukohu was constructed in 1908.

== Demographics ==
The SA1 statistical area which includes Broadwood covers 80.90 km^{2} (31.24 sq mi). The SA1 area is part of the larger Kohukohu-Broadwood statistical area.

Historical population for Broadwood and its surrounds
Year	Pop.	±% p.a.
2006	162	—
2013	120	−4.20%
2018	135	+2.38%
2023	132	−0.45%

The SA1 statistical area had a population of 132 in the 2023 New Zealand census, a decrease of 3 people (−2.2%) since the 2018 census, and an increase of 12 people (10.0%) since the 2013 census. There were 66 males and 63 females in 63 dwellings. 2.3% of people identified as LGBTQ+. The median age was 52.2 years (compared with 38.1 years nationally). There were 18 people (13.6%) aged under 15 years, 9 (6.8%) aged 15 to 29, 66 (50.0%) aged 30 to 64, and 39 (29.5%) aged 65 or older.

People could identify as more than one ethnicity. The results were 63.6% European (Pākehā), 52.3% Māori, 11.4% Pasifika, 2.3% Asian, and 4.5% other, which includes people giving their ethnicity as "New Zealander". English was spoken by 97.7%, Māori language by 15.9%, and other languages by 2.3%. No language could be spoken by 2.3% (e.g. too young to talk). The percentage of people born overseas was 6.8, compared with 28.8% nationally.

Religious affiliations were 43.2% Christian, 2.3% Māori religious beliefs, and 2.3% New Age. People who answered that they had no religion were 43.2%, and 6.8% of people did not answer the census question.

Of those at least 15 years old, 15 (13.2%) people had a bachelor's or higher degree, 66 (57.9%) had a post-high school certificate or diploma, and 27 (23.7%) people exclusively held high school qualifications. The median income was $26,100, compared with $41,500 nationally. The employment status of those at least 15 was that 36 (31.6%) people were employed full-time, 24 (21.1%) were part-time, and 3 (2.6%) were unemployed.

=== Kohukohu-Broadwood statistical area ===
Kohukohu-Broadwood statistical area covers the area north of the Hokianga Harbour between Kohukohu and Broadwood. It has an area of 209.19 km^{2} (80.77 sq mi) and had an estimated population of 750 as of June 2025, with a population density of 3.6 people per km^{2}.

Historical population for Kohukohu-Broadwood
Year	Pop.	±% p.a.
2006	747	—
2013	624	−2.54%
2018	726	+3.07%
2023	738	+0.33%

Kohukohu-Broadwood had a population of 738 in the 2023 New Zealand census, an increase of 12 people (1.7%) since the 2018 census, and an increase of 114 people (18.3%) since the 2013 census. There were 375 males, 360 females and 6 people of other genders in 348 dwellings. 3.7% of people identified as LGBTIQ+. The median age was 54.8 years (compared with 38.1 years nationally). There were 111 people (15.0%) aged under 15 years, 72 (9.8%) aged 15 to 29, 336 (45.5%) aged 30 to 64, and 219 (29.7%) aged 65 or older.

People could identify as more than one ethnicity. The results were 59.8% European (Pākehā), 57.3% Māori, 6.9% Pasifika, 1.6% Asian, and 2.4% other, which includes people giving their ethnicity as "New Zealander". English was spoken by 98.4%, Māori language by 19.1%, and other languages by 4.1%. No language could be spoken by 1.2% (e.g. too young to talk). New Zealand Sign Language was known by 0.8%. The percentage of people born overseas was 12.6, compared with 28.8% nationally.

Religious affiliations were 36.6% Christian, 0.4% Islam, 8.5% Māori religious beliefs, 0.4% Buddhist, 1.6% New Age, 0.4% Jewish, and 0.8% other religions. People who answered that they had no religion were 45.1%, and 7.3% of people did not answer the census question.

Of those at least 15 years old, 78 (12.4%) people had a bachelor's or higher degree, 357 (56.9%) had a post-high school certificate or diploma, and 168 (26.8%) people exclusively held high school qualifications. The median income was $24,600, compared with $41,500 nationally. 18 people (2.9%) earned over $100,000 compared to 12.1% nationally. The employment status of those at least 15 was that 183 (29.2%) people were employed full-time, 102 (16.3%) were part-time, and 36 (5.7%) were unemployed.

== Education ==
Broadwood Area School is a coeducational composite (years 1–15) school with a roll of 126 students as of July 2026. It was founded in 1908, and became a District High School in 1952, and an Area School in 1973. A state aided school functioned at Broadwood from 1895 to 1904.
