= Waihou River (Northland) =

River in Northland, New Zealand

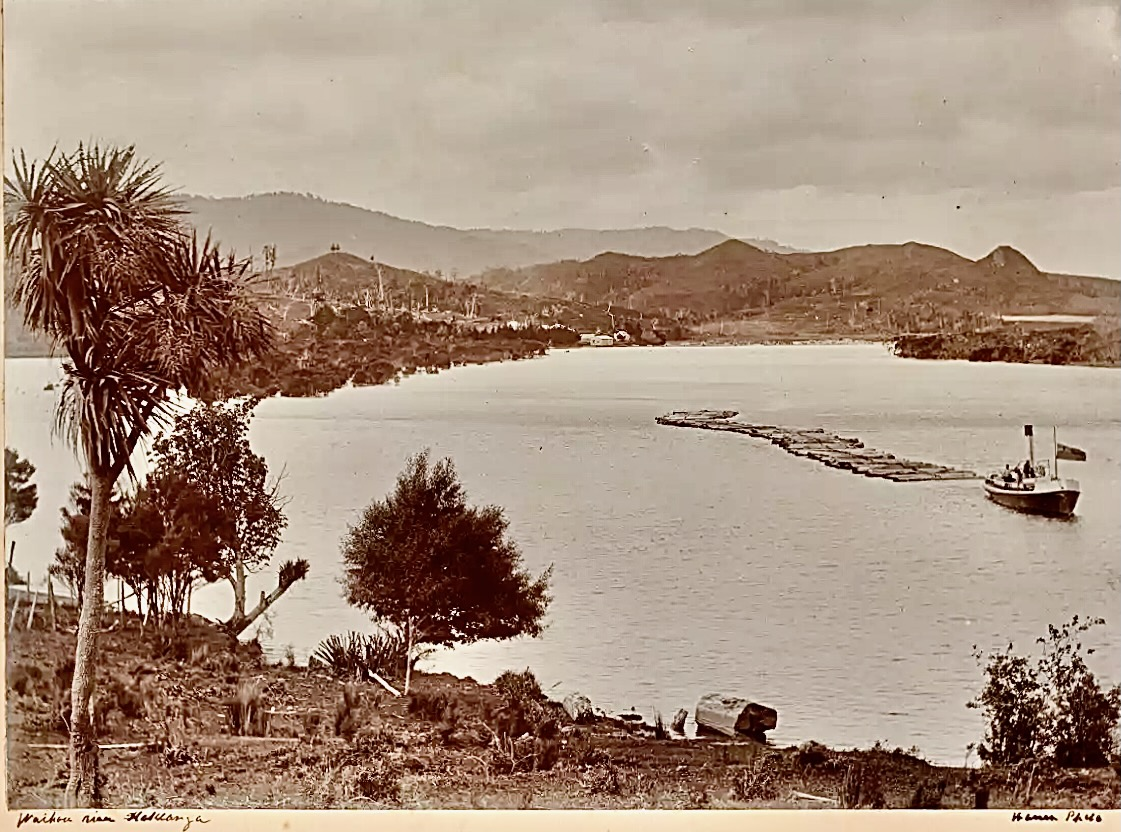
- A tug towing timber on the Waihou River
- Route of the Waihou River
- Mouth of the Waihou River
- Etymology: Māori meaning "new waters"
- Native name: Waihou (Māori)

Location
- Country: New Zealand
- Region: Northland Region
- District: Far North District

Physical characteristics
- Source: Confluence of the Waipapa River and the Whakanekeneke River
  - coordinates: 35°17′32″S 173°39′50″E
  - elevation: 5 m (16 ft)
- Mouth: Hokianga Harbour
  - coordinates: 35°21′18″S 173°33′16″E
  - elevation: 0 m (0 ft)
- Length: 16 kilometres (9.9 mi)

Basin features
- Progression: Waihou River → Hokianga Harbour
- River system: Waihou River
- Tributaries
  - left: Wairere River, Utakura River, Whakanekeneke River
  - right: Mangamuka River, Orira River, Waipapa River

The Waihou River is the name of two rivers flowing into Hokianga Harbour in the Northland Region of New Zealand's North Island.

The larger river is formed at the confluence of the Waipapa and Whakanekeneke Rivers. It flows southwest to form one of the upper arms of Hokianga Harbour.

The smaller river flows south east from the 600 m (2,000 ft)+ mountains of Warawara Forest Park into the Whakarapa River at Lower Waihou.
