= Ōpūrehu River =

Coordinates: 35.208034°S 173.544091°E

Location
- Country: New Zealand

Physical characteristics
- Source
  - location: Maungataniwha Range
- Mouth
  - location: Mangamuka River
- Length: 12 kilometres (7.5 mi)

The Ōpūrehu River is a river of the Northland Region of New Zealand's North Island. It flows south from the eastern end of the Maungataniwha Range to reach the Mangamuka River at the small settlement of Mangamuka.

== See also ==
- List of rivers of New Zealand
