= Waipapa River (Northland) =

Coordinates: 35.3119°S 173.6172°E

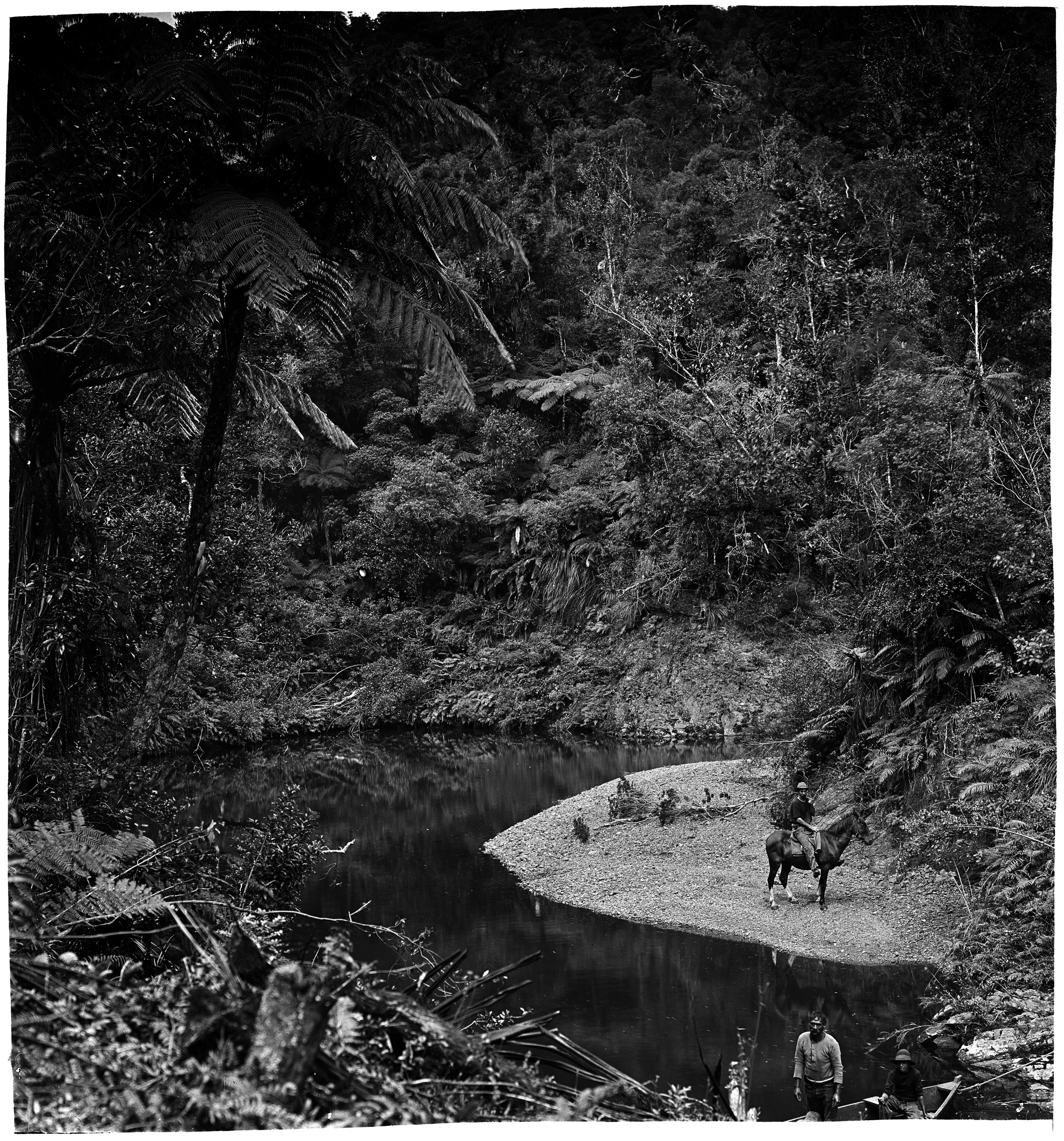
- Waipapa River in 1918

Location
- Country: New Zealand

Physical characteristics
- Mouth
  - location: Whakanekeneke River
- Length: 17 km (11 mi)

The Waipapa River is a river of the Northland Region of New Zealand's North Island. It flows generally southwest to reach the Whakanekeneke River, 12 kilometres northwest of Lake Ōmāpere, where they become the Waihou River.

== See also ==
- List of rivers of New Zealand
