= Mangamuka =

- Location within Northland Region
- Coordinates: 35°14′20″S 173°32′40″E
- Country: New Zealand
- Region: Northland Region
- District: Far North District

Mangamuka is a district in Northland, New Zealand, at the junction of the Mangamuka and Opurehu Rivers. State Highway 1 runs through the area, and the settlement of Mangamuka Bridge lies at the point where the highway crosses the Mangamuku River. The river runs into the upper Hokianga Harbour. Just to the north west, the highway runs through Mangamuka Gorge in the Maungataniwha Range. Umawera lies to the south east.

The New Zealand Ministry for Culture and Heritage gives a translation of "stream of the furled shoot of the nīkau plant" for Mangamuka.

== History and culture ==
Ngāpuhi chief Hongi Hika was shot in the lungs during a minor engagement on the shores of the Mangamuka River in January 1829. The wound eventually killed him.

The first European surveyor on the Mangamuka River was von Sturmer. The first settlement was at Tutekehua in 1874, downstream from what later became Mangamuka Bridge. The settlers cleared the land, planted orchards, and grew grain. A fruit canning and jam making factory was established, although it no longer exists.

=== Marae ===
The local Mangamuka Marae and meeting house are affiliated with the Ngāpuhi hapū of Kōhatutaka and Te Uri Māhoe.

== Omahuta Kauri Sanctuary ==
The Mangamuka Forest survived the logging era with many giant kauri trees intact. In 1952 the Omahuta Kauri Sanctuary was set up to provide public access to the trees, with boardwalks built to both protect the tree roots and keep visitor's feet dry. The walk takes 30–45 minutes.

== Education ==
Mangamuka School is a coeducational contributing primary (years 1-6) school with a decile rating of 2 and a roll of 24.
