= St Gabriel's Church, Pawarenga =

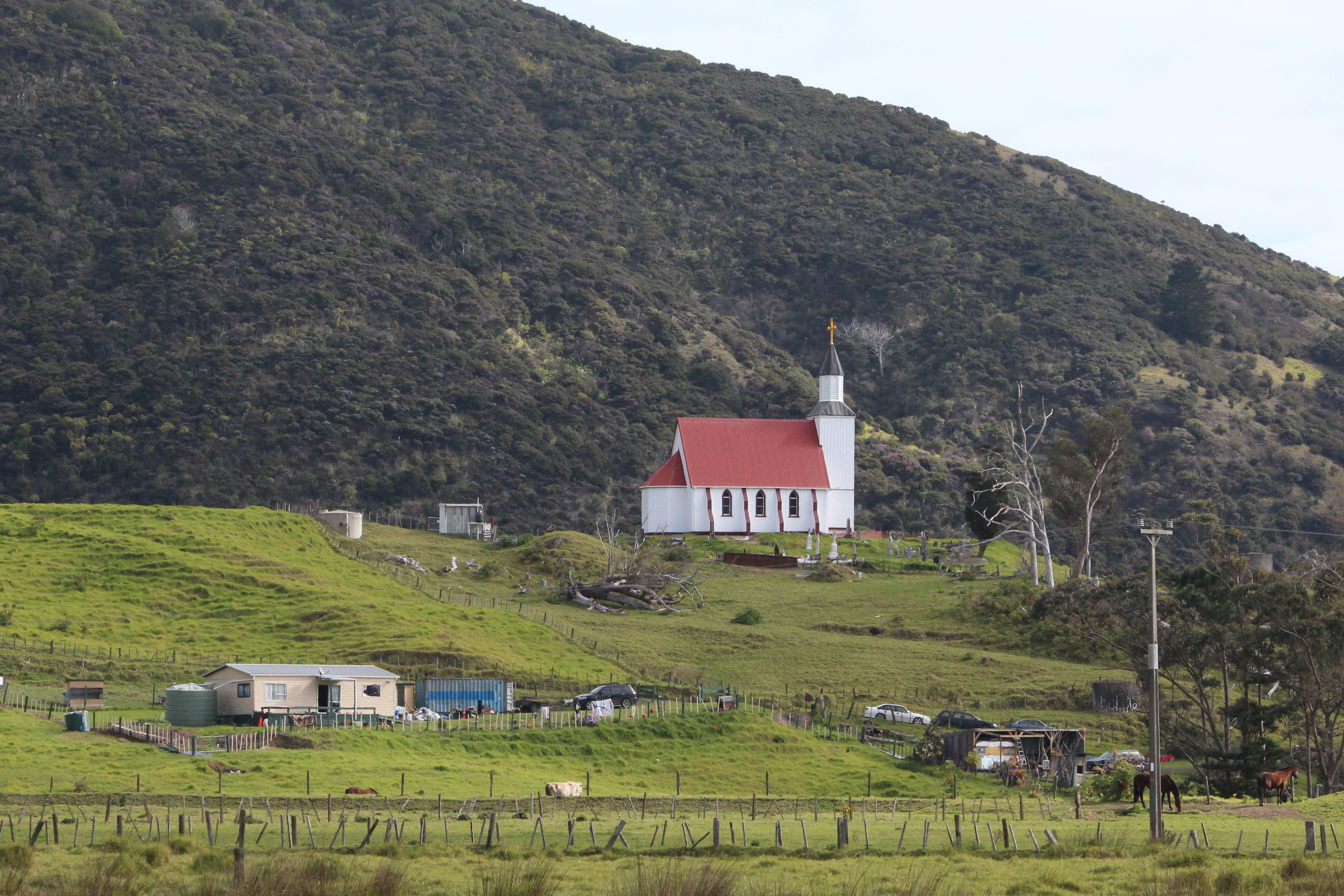
- St Gabriel's Church, Pawarenga
- 35°21′11.974″S 173°14′52.850″E
- Location: Warawara Forest Road, Pawarenga
- Country: New Zealand
- Denomination: Catholic

Architecture
- Functional status: Active
- Architectural type: Church
- Style: Gothic Revival
- Years built: 1899

Administration
- Diocese: Auckland
- Parish: Panguru Parish

Heritage New Zealand – Category 1
- Official name: St Gabriel's Church (Catholic)
- Designated: 27 June 2008
- Reference no.: 76

St Gabriel's Church is a heritage-listed Catholic church and associated churchyard at Pawarenga, in the Northland region of New Zealand. Built in 1899 in the Gothic Revival style, the building has played an important role in the Catholic faith for Māori of the Hokianga. The church was registered by the New Zealand Historic Places Trust as a Category I building in 2008.

== Background ==
Catholic missionaries had been active among the Māori people in the Northland region of New Zealand since 1838, when Bishop Jean-Baptiste Pompallier, of the French Marist Brothers, arrived in the Hokianga and set up the first Catholic mission there. However, generally the Church Missionary Society, an Anglican organisation, dominated the area and this was exacerbated when the French Marists left the area in the early 1850s. It was not until the appointment of James McDonald as vicar general to Māori in the Catholic Diocese of Auckland in 1883 that the situation in Northland began to change. Until his death in 1890, McDonald was responsible for the Māori in the Auckland diocese and under his influence, several, often primitive, churches were built in the Far North. After his death in 1890, McDonald's work was carried by missionaries from St Joseph's Foreign Missionary Society in London. These workers, invited in 1886 by the Catholic Bishop of Auckland to work among the Māori in Northland, were known as Mill Hill Fathers, on account of the society being founded in the Mill Hill suburb of London.

Among the Mill Hill missionaries who came to the region in the 1890s was Father John Baptist Becker, who was originally from Germany. Like the other Mill Hill Fathers, he embedded himself into the Northland community and learnt te reo (Māori language). Under his influence, more churches were built, many to replace those built under the supervision of McDonald. This included the Catholic church at Pawarenga, which was the result of McDonald's work in the 1880s.

== History ==
Pawarenga is a rural location on the southern side of Whangapē Harbour, which is 42 kilometres (26 mi) to the southwest of modern-day Kaitaia. The local rangatira (chief), and an early convert to Catholicism, was Tamaho Te Huhu; he was one of the signatories to the 1835 Declaration of Independence of New Zealand. The construction of the new church began in 1899. The builder, Robert Shannon, a Kaitaia flaxmiller, was funded by the local community through their kauri gum digging efforts at nearby Waiharera and they also contributed the timber that was used in the building. It is sited on Makora pā (hill fort), on a hill overlooking Whangapē Harbour and which is considered to be the origin place of the Te Aupōuri iwi (tribe).

St Gabriel's Church was completed in late 1899 and the building was likely blessed by Becker in October that year. It was one of the larger churches built in Northland under the stewardship of Becker, who moved to Pawarenga in 1915. At this time, St Gabriel's Church became the parish church. A presbytery was built next to the church for Becker to live in. Even after Becker's departure from the area in 1921, this remained in use until 1954 at which time it was removed.

The urban drift of Māori saw a decline in the size of the community but by the early 1980s this was reversing. Efforts were made to improve the church, including replacement of the building's foundation and roof, and restoration of the timber lining. The church is surrounded by a cemetery, partitioned off by a post and wire fence. Te Huhu is one of the interments there, as is his younger brother Kaperiere Te Huhu, who was an advocate for the building of St Gabriel's. The cemetery also contains an official war grave, that of James Adams, a soldier with the New Zealand (Māori) Pioneer Battalion who died in 1918.

== Design ==
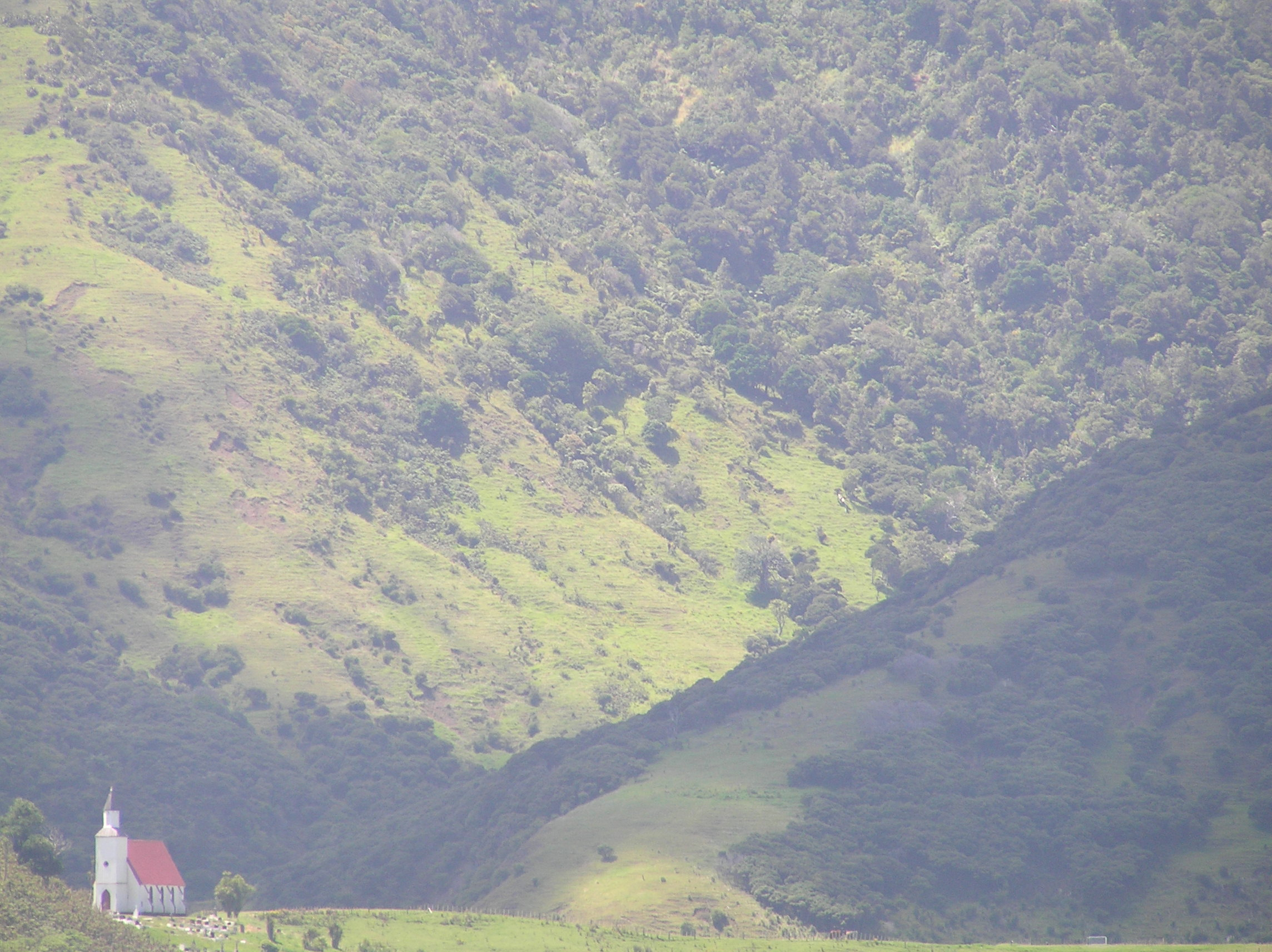
A view of St Gabriel's Church

St Gabriel's Church was designed in the Gothic Revival style. Ross suggests that the intricacy of the building's design is such that it is likely an architect was involved although their identity is not known. Bill McKay considers that it is likely that Shannon, the builder of the church, is responsible for the design. The building, about 12.2 metres (40 ft) by 6.7 metres (22 ft), has a nave with its entrance on the north facing side, overlooked by a square tower with a belfry sitting atop a truncated pyramid. The tower is capped with a copper turret mounting a cross. The southern side of the building is provided with a five-sided apse. The roof of the nave is steeply pitched and supported by a series of buttresses. Both the nave and the apse is clad with sheets of corrugated galvanised iron. From its underside, the roof is supported by scissor trusses with a vertical element extending to the apex of the roof.

Internally, the buttresses separate the nave into five distinct bays. The walls are lined with kauri timber as are the doors, on which the boards are arranged on a diagonal. The wainscote is similarly lined. There are two altars; the original, High Altar, is an ornate structure but a second altar, was subsequently built over the sanctuary steps to conform to the conditions of the New Liturgy. These are separated from the rest of the nave by a balustrade. An unusual feature of the church is the depiction of the 12 Stations of the Cross as painted copper pressings. These were added in the 1950s.

== Legacy ==
Located on Warawara Forest Road, St Gabriel's Church was listed by Heritage New Zealand as a Historic Place Category 1 on 27 June 2008. A factor in its heritage listing is its significance to the Māori of the Far North and its usage for over 100 years. The church is still in use as part of the Panguru Parish of the Catholic Diocese of Auckland.
