= Awaroa River (Far North) =

Coordinates: 35.336709°S 173.241652°E

Location
- Country: New Zealand

Physical characteristics
- Mouth
  - location: Tasman Sea
- Length: 12 km (7.5 mi)

The Awaroa River is a short river in the Far North District of New Zealand. It is 25 kilometres (16 mi) south of Kaitaia, and flows southwest for 12 kilometres (7.5 mi), reaching the Tasman Sea to the north of the Hokianga Harbour. Its estuary forms one of the two arms of Whangape Harbour (the other being the estuary of the Rotokakahi River).

The New Zealand Ministry for Culture and Heritage gives a translation of "long river" for Awaroa.

== See also ==
- List of rivers of New Zealand
