= Rotokakahi River =

Coordinates: 35°20′S 173°17′E

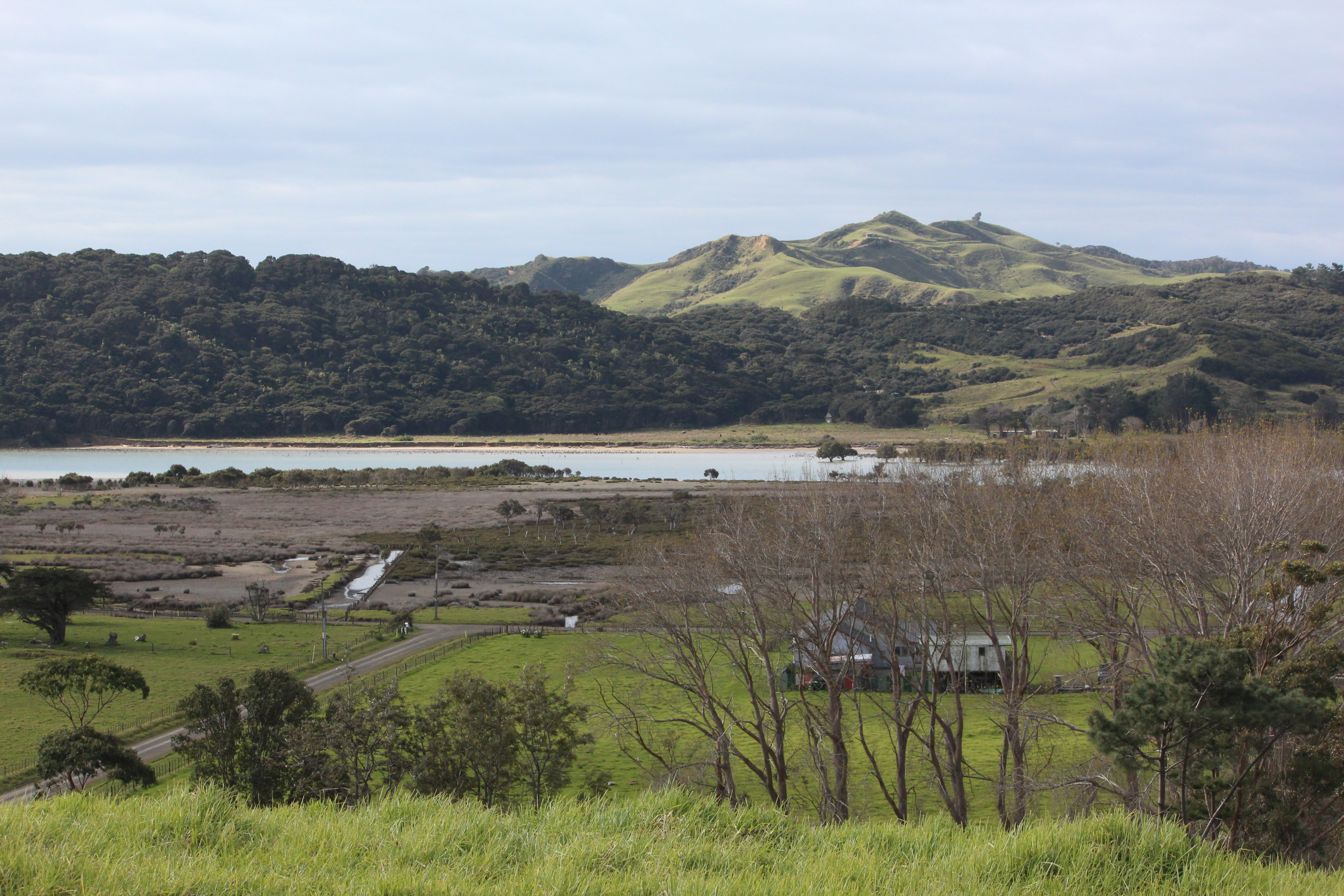

Location
- Country: New Zealand

Physical characteristics
- Source
  - location: Maungataniwha Range
- Mouth
  - location: Whangape Harbour
- Length: 28 km (17 mi)

The Rotokakahi River is a river of the Northland Region of New Zealand's North Island. Its winding course is predominantly southwestward from its origins in the Maungataniwha Range. It reaches the Tasman Sea 25 kilometres (16 mi) south of Kaitaia, and its estuary forms one of the two arms of Whangape Harbour (the other being the estuary of the Awaroa River).

== See also ==
- List of rivers of New Zealand
