= Kohukohu =

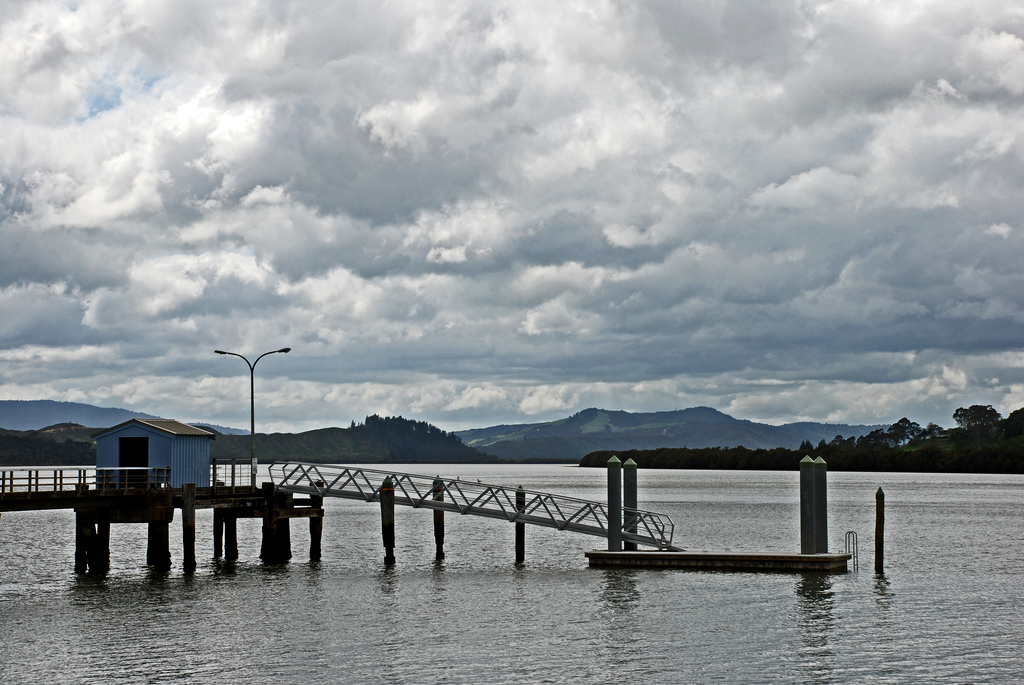
- Kohukohu Wharf
- Interactive map of Kohukohu
- Coordinates: 35°21′41″S 173°32′39″E
- Country: New Zealand
- Region: Northland Region
- District: Far North District
- Ward: Kaikohe/Hokianga
- Community: Kaikohe-Hokianga
- Subdivision: North Hokianga
- Electorates: Northland; Te Tai Tokerau

Government
  - Territorial Authority: Far North District Council
  - Regional council: Northland Regional Council
  - Mayor of Far North: Moko Tepania
  - Northland MP: Grant McCallum
  - Te Tai Tokerau MP: Mariameno Kapa-Kingi

Area
  - Total: 4.26 km^{2} (1.64 sq mi)

Population (June 2025)
  - Total: 180
  - Density: 42/km^{2} (110/sq mi)

Kohukohu is a town on the Hokianga Harbour in the Northland Region of New Zealand. It was one of the first European settlements in New Zealand.

Kohukohu is situated on the northern shore of the harbour where it splits into two rivers, the Mangamuka River branching inland to the northeast and the Waihou River leading towards the east past Mangungu, Horeke and Rangiahua.

Where the harbour divides there is a small island called Motiti which was painted by Augustus Earle, the first European artist to spend several months in New Zealand, during his visit to the Hokianga in 1827. He wrote "we were sailing up a spacious sheet of water, which became considerably wider after entering it; while majestic hills rose on each side .... looking up the river we beheld various headlands stretching into the water and gradually contracting its width, 'till they became fainter and fainter in the distance and all was lost in the azure of the horizon".

== History and culture ==
=== Pre-European settlement ===
According to Te Tai Tokerau tradition, the legendary Polynesian explorer Kupe visited the area prior to his return voyage to Hawaiiki. Angry at the food from the hāngī (earth oven) being insufficiently cooked, he swore at those responsible. Kohukohu is Māori for a swearword or expletive.

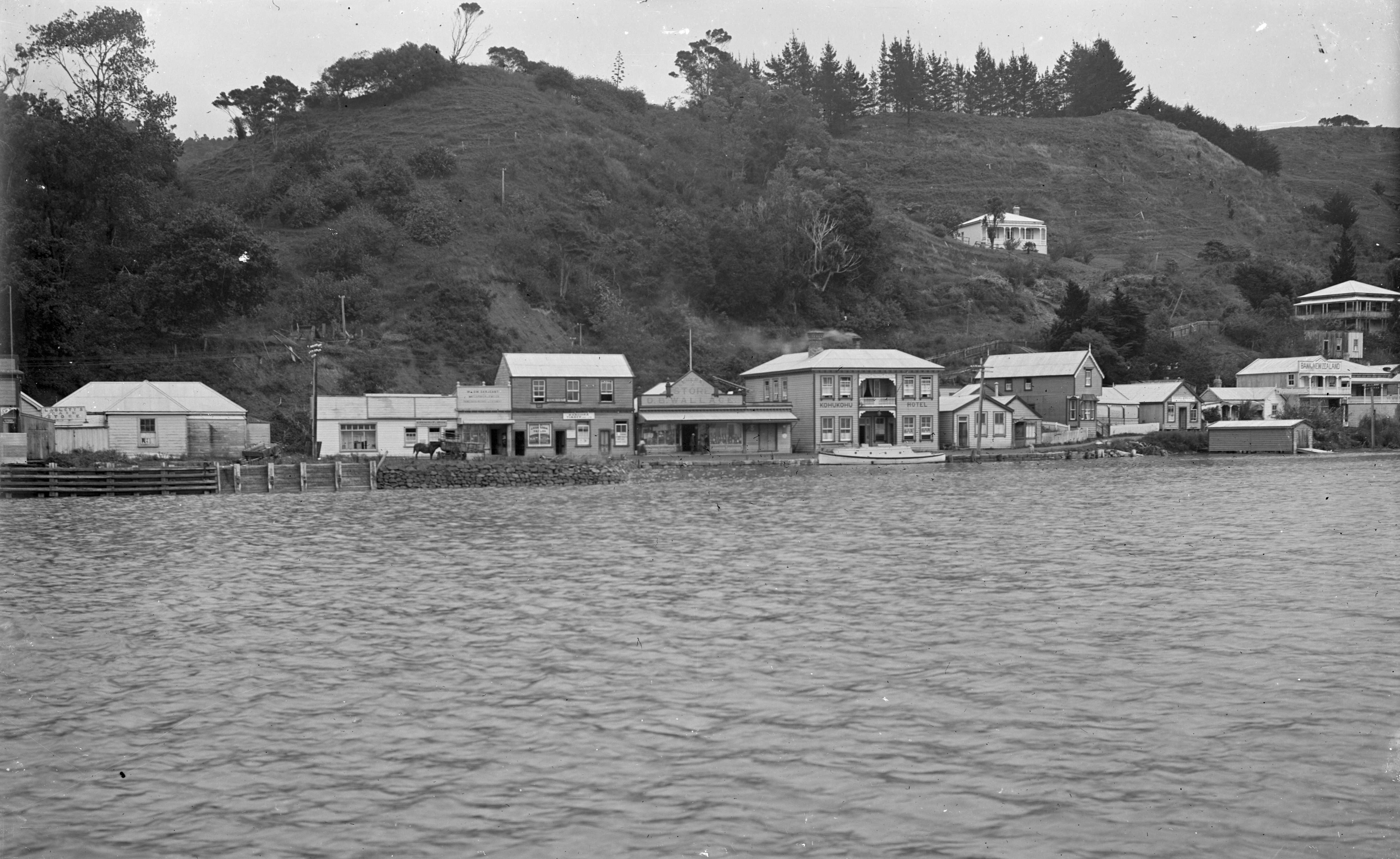
Kohukohu in 1918. On the foreshore are the Kohukohu Hotel, the Bank of New Zealand, D B Wallace Store, Laslett's Cash Store, and W L Sargeant (machinist)

=== European settlement ===
The first recorded European to enter the Hokianga Harbour arrived in 1819 and by the 1830s, Kohukohu was the heart of New Zealand's timber industry. The country's first Catholic mass was celebrated 8 kilometres north of Kohukohu at Totara Point in 1838. The Hokianga Sawmill Company built a sawmill in 1878.

For nearly one hundred years Kohukohu was an important timber milling town and the largest commercial centre on the north of the harbour. In 1900, the township had a population of almost 2,000 people.

== Marae ==
Kohukohu has three marae affiliated with the hapū Te Ihutai: Pateoro or Te Karae Marae and Pōwhiri meeting house which affiliates with Te Rarawa; Pikipāria Marae and Ngarunui meeting house which affiliates with Ngāpuhi; and Tauteihiihi Marae and Tokimatahourua meeting house.

There is also a marae affiliated with other Te Rarawa hapū: Ngāti Here. Waiparera Marae and Nukutawhiti meeting house are affiliated with Patutoka, Tahāwai, Te Whānau Pani and Te Hokokeha.

In October 2020, the Government committed $1,407,731 from the Provincial Growth Fund to upgrade Ngāi Tupoto Marae and 8 other marae of Te Rarawa, creating 100 jobs.

== Kohukohu Bridge ==
The Kohukohu footbridge near the centre of the town is believed to be the first stone bridge built in New Zealand, and is the oldest surviving bridge in New Zealand. It was built some time between 1843 and 1851 at the mouth of the Waihouuru Creek where it flowed into the Hokianga Harbour. At the time, ships from Sydney used sandstone blocks as ballast, which they left at Kohukohu in exchange for more-valuable timber, and these sandstone blocks were used to build the bridge. When a timber mill opened next to the bridge in 1879 sawdust was used to gradually reclaim the harbour, and the reclamation has buried most of the bridge, which is now about 100 m back from the foreshore. The bridge was registered in 2008 as a Category 1 Historic Place.

Kohukohu footbridge

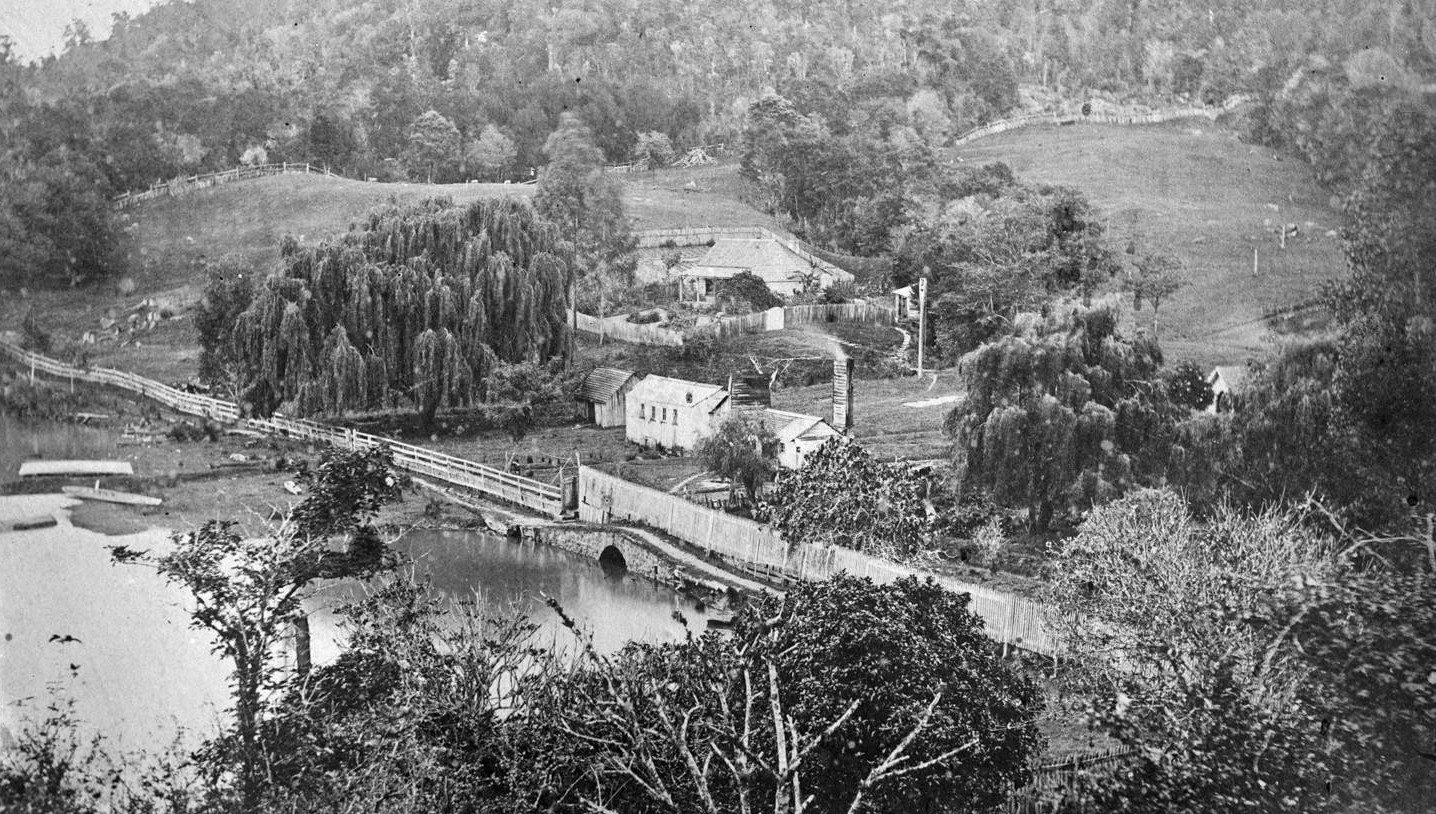
Kohukohu c. 1867-1869. The old stone bridge is clearly visible, before the harbour was filled in

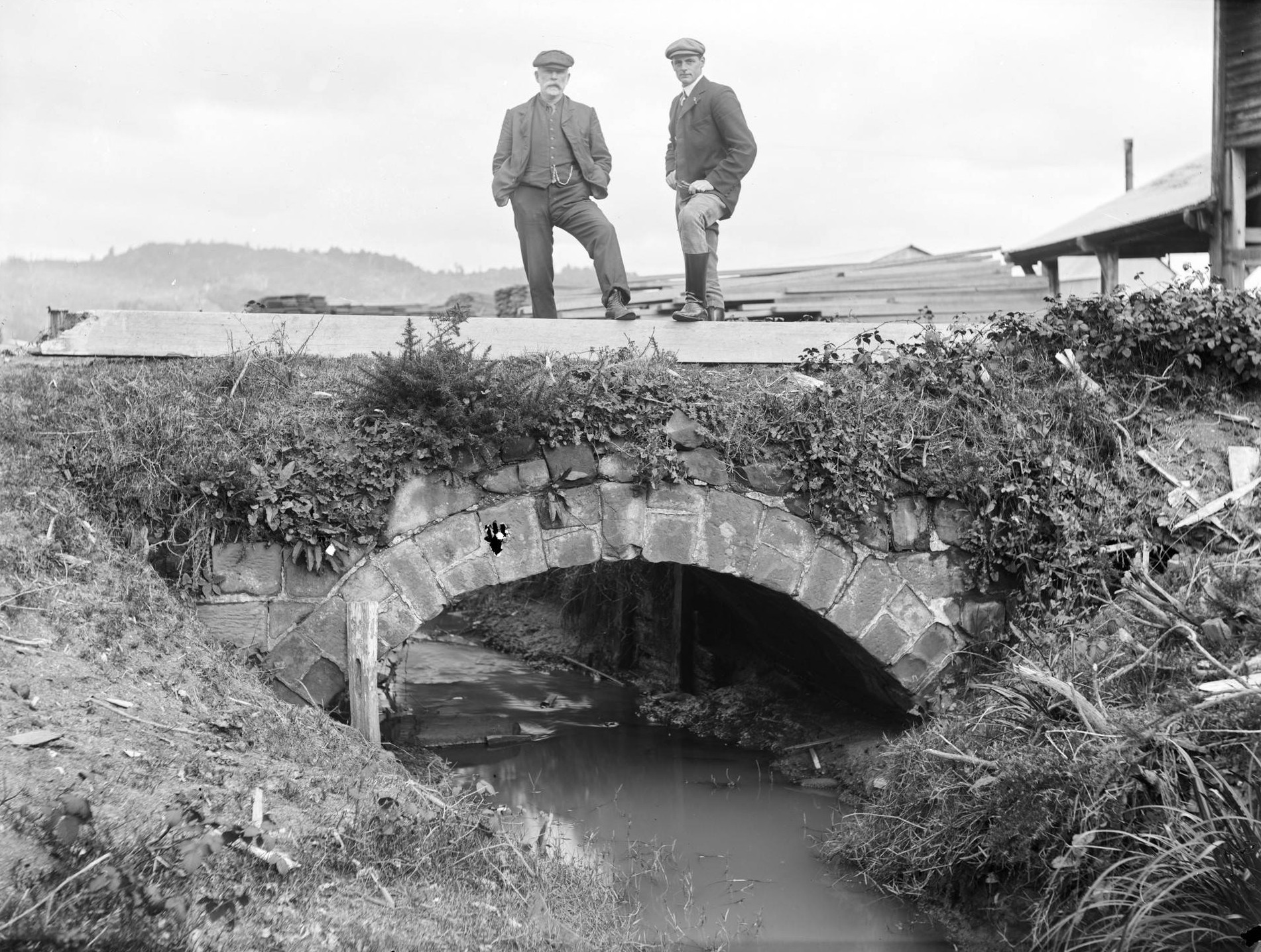
Kohukohu bridge around 1900 to 1920, with the timber mill visible in the background

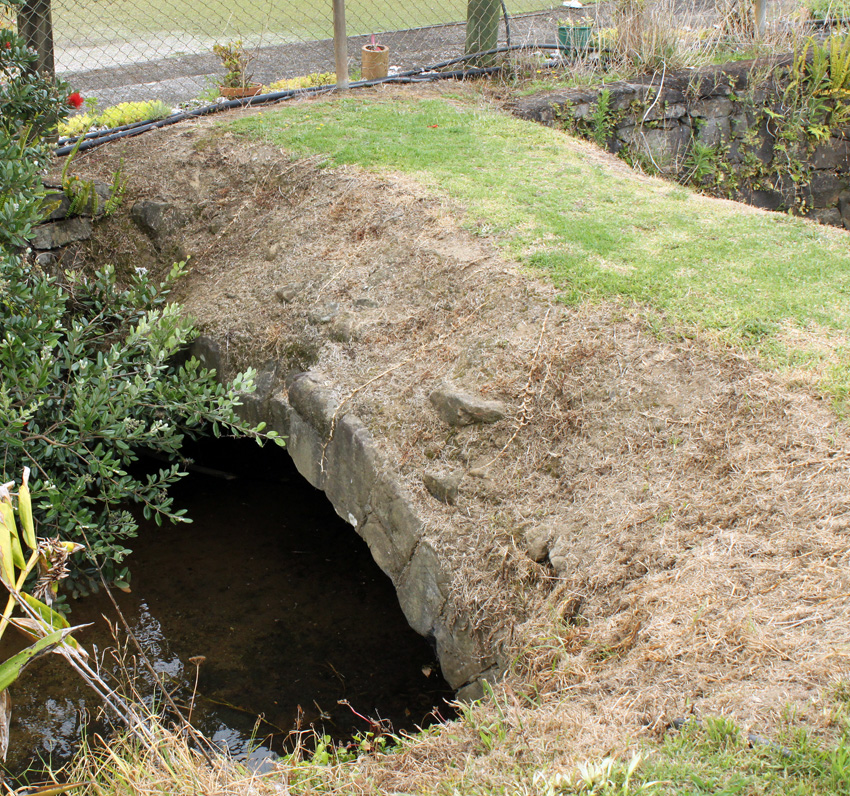
Kohukohu footbridge today

== Demographics ==
Statistics New Zealand describes Kohukohu as a rural settlement. It covers 4.26 km^{2} (1.64 sq mi) and had an estimated population of 180 as of June 2025, with a population density of 42 people per km^{2}. Kohukohu is part of the larger Kohukohu-Broadwood statistical area.

Historical population
Year	Pop.	±% p.a.
2006	186	—
2013	168	−1.44%
2018	168	+0.00%
2023	180	+1.39%

Kohukohu had a population of 180 in the 2023 New Zealand census, an increase of 12 people (7.1%) since the 2018 census, and an increase of 12 people (7.1%) since the 2013 census. There were 84 males and 96 females in 102 dwellings. 5.0% of people identified as LGBTIQ+. The median age was 59.7 years (compared with 38.1 years nationally). There were 24 people (13.3%) aged under 15 years, 12 (6.7%) aged 15 to 29, 72 (40.0%) aged 30 to 64, and 69 (38.3%) aged 65 or older.

People could identify as more than one ethnicity. The results were 78.3% European (Pākehā), 43.3% Māori, 3.3% Pasifika, and 3.3% Asian. English was spoken by 98.3%, Māori language by 6.7%, Samoan by 1.7% and other languages by 6.7%. No language could be spoken by 1.7% (e.g. too young to talk). New Zealand Sign Language was known by 1.7%. The percentage of people born overseas was 20.0, compared with 28.8% nationally.

Religious affiliations were 31.7% Christian, 3.3% Māori religious beliefs, and 1.7% Jewish. People who answered that they had no religion were 55.0%, and 6.7% of people did not answer the census question.

Of those at least 15 years old, 30 (19.2%) people had a bachelor's or higher degree, 81 (51.9%) had a post-high school certificate or diploma, and 36 (23.1%) people exclusively held high school qualifications. The median income was $23,700, compared with $41,500 nationally. 9 people (5.8%) earned over $100,000 compared to 12.1% nationally. The employment status of those at least 15 was that 36 (23.1%) people were employed full-time, 21 (13.5%) were part-time, and 15 (9.6%) were unemployed.

== Education ==
Kohukohu School is a co-educational full primary (years 1-8) school with a roll of 24 students as of July 2026. The school was established in 1883, but moved to a new location in 1972 because the ground on the original site was unstable. The original site with the original school building is now a historic reserve.

== Notable people ==
- James Fisher-Harris, rugby league player for the Warriors
