= Utakura River =

Coordinates: 35°20′S 173°37′E

Location
- Country: New Zealand

Physical characteristics
- Source
  - location: Lake Ōmāpere
  - elevation: 238 metres (781 ft)
- Mouth
  - location: Waihou River
- Length: 15 km (9.3 mi)
- Basin size: 120 km^{2} (46 sq mi)

The Utakura River is a river of the Northland Region of New Zealand's North Island. It flows west from its sources northwest of Kaikohe, reaching the Waihou River at the point where it widens to become an arm of the Hokianga Harbour.

Long and short-fin eels, smelt, īnanga, torrentfish and redfin bully live in the river. The river is assessed as fair, in a scale between good and poor, as it suffers from turbidity and e-coli and phosphorus pollution.

== See also ==
- List of rivers of New Zealand
