= Hokianga Sawmill Company =

Historic place in New Zealand

The Hokianga Sawmill Company wharf was built in 1878 at Kohukohu as the first stage of the company's sawmilling operations there. It was constructed by Auckland shipwright William Lowe from totara and heart kauri with local Maori engaged to do the labour. The sawmill was later taken over in 1888 by the Kauri Timber Company as part of its nationwide purchasing of sawmilling companies and assets. The wharf and mill site was later used for the manufacture of butter boxes from 1933 until 1937. The wharf was decommissioned in 1938. The former wharf is on the Heritage New Zealand list of historic places as a Category 2 site, List No: 3947 and was registered on 6 September 1984.

== History ==
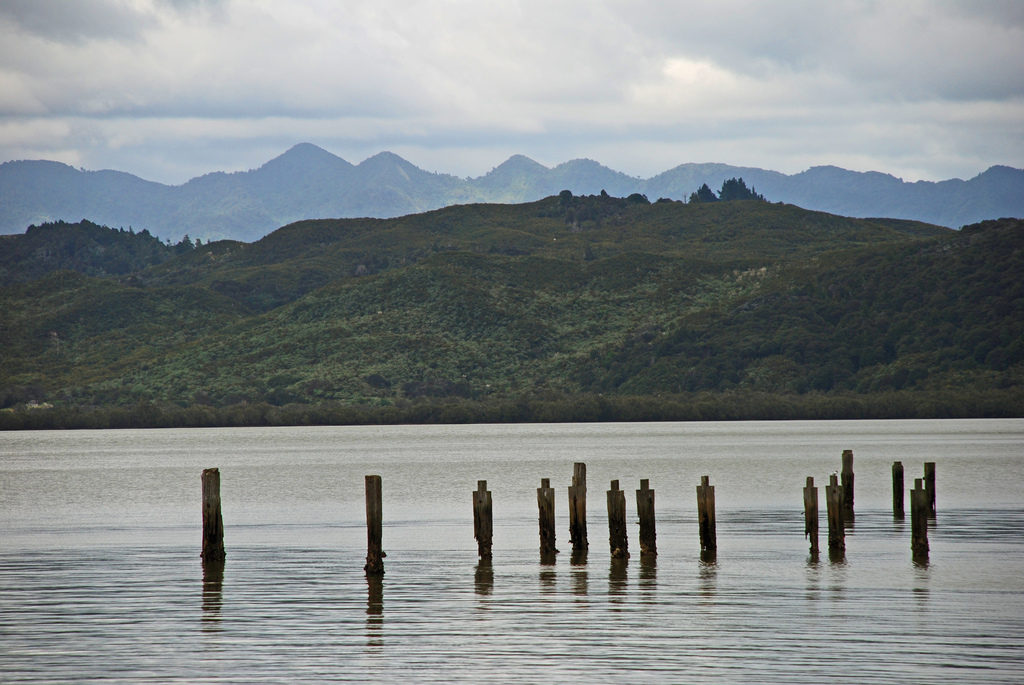
The remains of the Hokianga Sawmill Company wharf

In early 1878, negotiations were carried out with Ngāti Toro by John McFarlane representing Brownlee & Co for the cutting rights to the extensive kauri forests in the Hokianga. The negotiations were assisted by licensed interpreter Robert Cochrane and a deed of lease secured. By May 1878 the wharf and sawmill complex were under construction at the Kohukohu site. By September 1878 the mill wharf had been completed. Under the supervision of Auckland-based shipwright William Lowe, the structure had been built by local Maori for the newly formed Hokianga Sawmill Company. The T-shaped wharf was 447 ft (136 m) in length, with the pilings ranging in length from 30 ft (9.1 m) to 50 ft (15 m). The structure included mooring and fender piles, double-headed stocks and a tramline which ran from the still being constructed milling site to the end of the wharf.

By April 1879 operations had commenced at the mill site. However, there were concerns of timber being in short supply with the lack of logs being brought downriver due to dry conditions. To supply the needs of the mill hands, two new stores, a butcher's shop and a bakery had been established along with an increase in the Kohukohu township's population. In October the barque Rose M was loaded with 200,000 ft (61,000 m) of baulk kauri for Melbourne. At the same time the three-masted brigantine Sophia was also loading at the mill wharf to sail at a later date.

By November 1879 the second part of the mill site was being finalised to increase production at the site. A 50 hp, two-cylinder engine for the site was manufactured in 1878 by the firm R Harvey & Co of Glasgow, Scotland. The engine was based on a vertical high-pressure system. Four upright pillars supported the slides on the outside. The pillars also carried a crankshaft and 15 ft (4.6 m) diameter flywheel. The flywheel had a belt attached to it, which was used to drive the rest of the machinery. Steam was derived from two multi-tube boilers surrounded by brick construction to separate them from the mill and the engine room. The buildings had been done in two stages with stage one beginning operations earlier in the year. The main building was double-storied with door and sash manufacturing done upstairs, while the groundfloor was taken up with the saws and benches.

In May 1882, the three ton flywheel used to drive the milling machinery came off its mountings and crashed through the roof of the engine house shattering on impact. The damage caused by the flywheel resulted in the milling operations having to shut down and the mill employees being paid off until repairs were instigated.

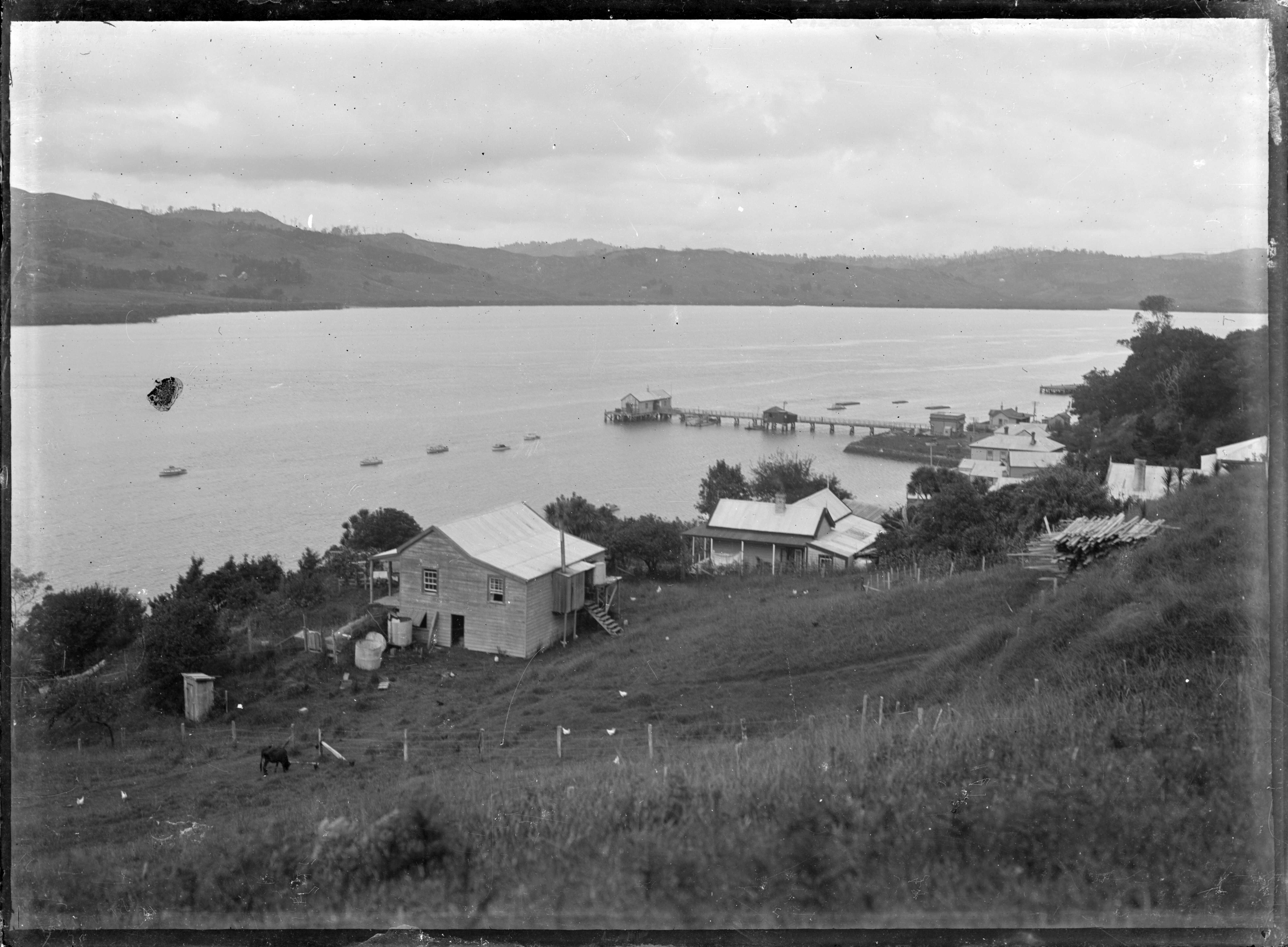
Kohukohu, overlooking the former timber mill wharf. Part of the reclamation using sawdust and ships' ballast can be seen on the foreshore (1918)

By June 1886, the Hokianga Sawmill Company was in financial difficulties. Its chairman John Henry Dalton called an extraordinary general meeting with the intention of placing the company into liquidation. The following month all mill hands were paid off and operations at the mill closed down.

In February 1887, tenders were advertised for the purchase of the assets and leaseholdings of the Hokianga Sawmill Company by the liquidators. The assets failed to sell and the property was put up for auction the following April. By July 1888 the Hokianga Sawmill Company site at Kohukohu was sold, along with the timber wharf, to the Kauri Timber Company.

Under the ownership of the Kauri Timber Company, by December 1892 the mill site covered more than eight acres (3.2 ha). The machinery was driven by a 15 hp vertical engine with three tubular boilers. A 100 ft (30 m) drying shed had been positioned on the landward side of the mill wharf. The weekly output of timber production at the time was 70,000 ft (21,000 m). Reclamation work was also being done along the foreshore beside the timber wharf using ships' ballast and sawdust from the mill site. However, earlier that year the mill site was closed for several months, which resulted in a significant drop in shipping traffic while timber production was suspended.

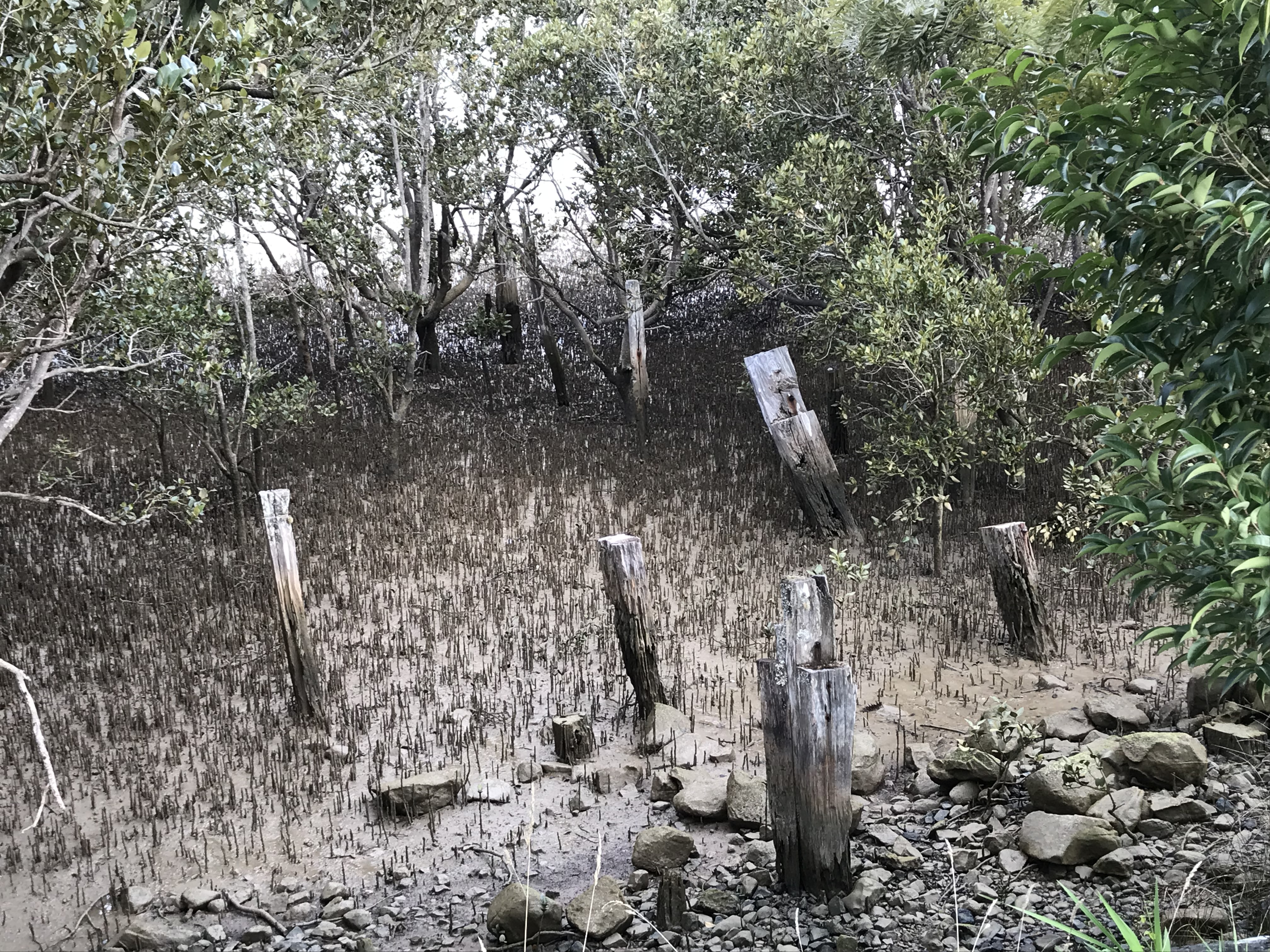
Surviving piles from the wharf near the foreshore at Kohukohu

In May 1906, a new breaking-down saw was installed at the mill along with a dual frame saw to increase production output to a minimum of 150,000 ft (46,000 m) of sawn timber each week.

Timber milling operations by the Kauri Timber Company appear to have ceased by about 1913 when the Marine Department undertook to construct breastwork around the sawdust reclamation area, put a road over part of it and subdivide the rest of the land it owned there into sections. At the same time an Order in Council revoked the Kauri Timber Company's right to occupy the foreshore.

In 1932, George King, owner of King's Sawmill Company, started the KVD Box Company, manufacturing butter boxes on the former Kauri Timber Company mill site. The company by 1933 employed 60 workers and turned out more than a million boxes annually. KVD also opened a factory in Morningside, Auckland, to meet demand. The butter boxes were manufactured from kahikatea milled on-site then processed into sawn lengths of timber before entering the rest of the manufacturing process.

On 1 April 1937 a fire of unknown origin destroyed the entire mill and factory, a general store and a truck. More than 70 workers lost their jobs.

In 1939, the former mill site was vested to the Kohukohu Town Board, which intended at the time to put a road across part of the site and utilise the rest as a children's playground. The former mill wharf was demolished in May the same year.
