= Tapuwae River =

Coordinates: 35°22′S 173°28′E

Location
- Country: New Zealand

Physical characteristics
- Mouth
  - location: Hokianga Harbour
- Length: 10 km (6.2 mi)

The Tapuwae River is a river of the Northland Region of New Zealand's North Island. Most of its length is as an arm of the drowned valley of the Hokianga Harbour, which it reaches from the north close to the small settlement of Tapuwae, five kilometres northwest of Rawene.

== See also ==
- List of rivers of New Zealand
