= Herekino =

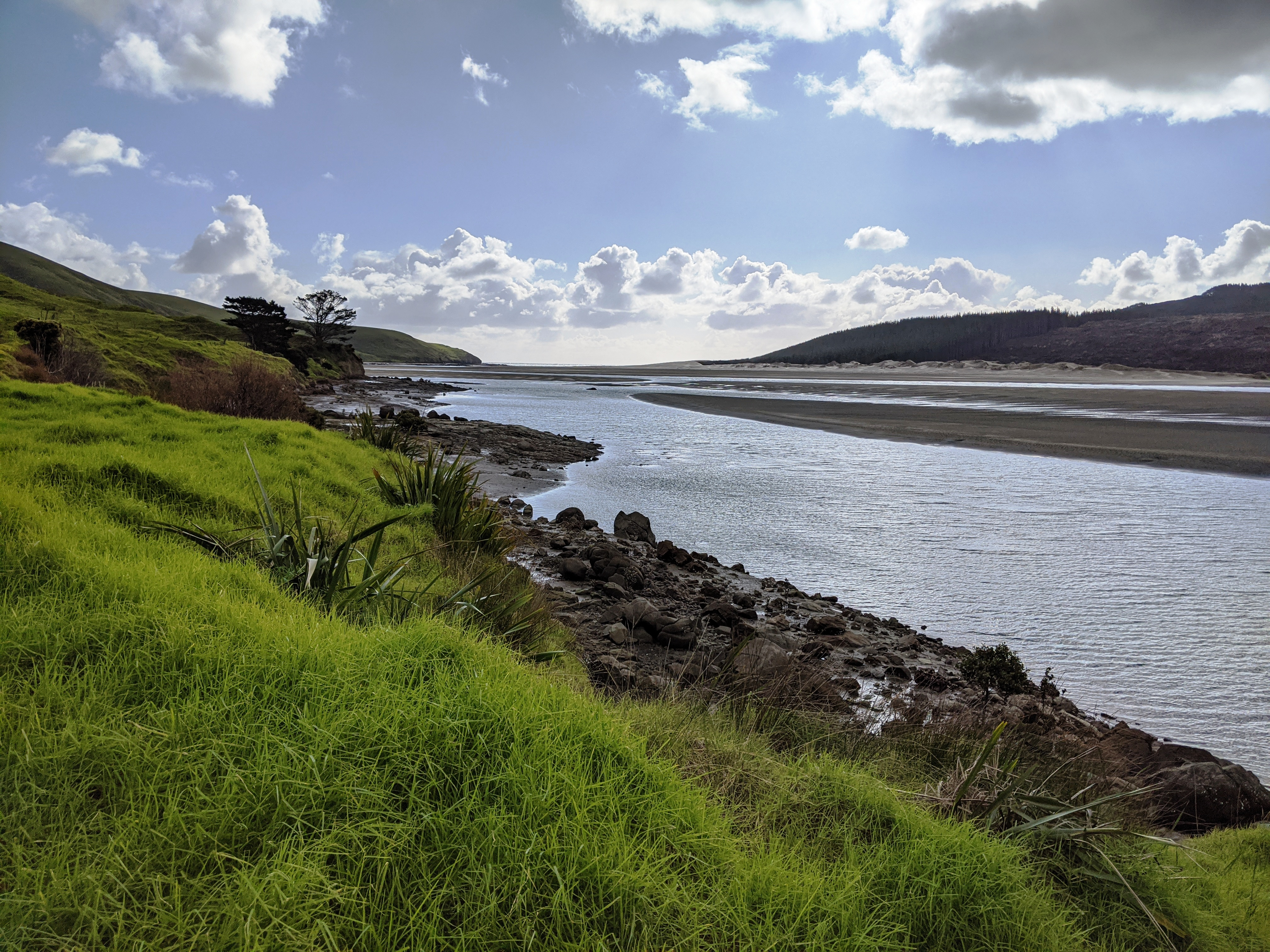
- Herekino Harbour near Owhata
- Interactive map of Herekino
- Coordinates: 35°15′53″S 173°12′38″E
- Country: New Zealand
- Region: Northland Region
- District: Far North District
- Ward: Te Hiku
- Community: Te Hiku
- Subdivision: Kaitāia
- Electorates: Northland; Te Tai Tokerau

Government
  - Territorial Authority: Far North District Council
  - Regional council: Northland Regional Council
  - Mayor of Far North: Moko Tepania
  - Northland MP: Grant McCallum
  - Te Tai Tokerau MP: Mariameno Kapa-Kingi

Area
  - Total: 11.47 km^{2} (4.43 sq mi)

Population (2023)
  - Total: 114
  - Density: 9.94/km^{2} (25.7/sq mi)

Herekino is a locality in Northland, New Zealand. It lies 26 km south west of Kaitaia. The Herekino Harbour, also called the Herekino River, is an estuary and inlet from the Tasman Sea to the west. The Herekino Forest, which contains a stand of large kauri, is to the north, and the Tauroa Peninsula lies to the north west.

The harbour is mostly above water at high tide, with just a shallow entrance channel. The upper reaches of the harbour contain a mangrove forest. The township of Herekino is at the north east end of the estuary, and the small settlement of Owhata lies on the rocky south shore of the harbour entrance. Owhata is a flat grassy area, with a fairly shallow beach of mud and sand. There is not much natural shelter, and there is a limited supply of fresh water in summer.

== Demographics ==
The SA1 statistical area which includes Herekino and Owhata covers 11.48 km^{2} (4.43 sq mi). The SA1 area is part of the larger Herekino-Takahue statistical area.

Historical population for Herekino and Owhata
Year	Pop.	±% p.a.
2006	111	—
2013	96	−2.05%
2018	84	−2.64%
2023	114	+6.30%

The SA1 statistical area had a population of 114 in the 2023 New Zealand census, an increase of 30 people (35.7%) since the 2018 census, and an increase of 18 people (18.8%) since the 2013 census. There were 60 males and 54 females in 39 dwellings. The median age was 45.2 years (compared with 38.1 years nationally). There were 21 people (18.4%) aged under 15 years, 21 (18.4%) aged 15 to 29, 48 (42.1%) aged 30 to 64, and 21 (18.4%) aged 65 or older.

People could identify as more than one ethnicity. The results were 39.5% European (Pākehā), 78.9% Māori, 5.3% Pasifika, and 5.3% other, which includes people giving their ethnicity as "New Zealander". English was spoken by 94.7%, Māori language by 28.9%, Samoan by 2.6% and other languages by 2.6%. No language could be spoken by 2.6% (e.g. too young to talk). The percentage of people born overseas was 7.9, compared with 28.8% nationally.

Religious affiliations were 44.7% Christian, and 2.6% Māori religious beliefs. People who answered that they had no religion were 36.8%, and 13.2% of people did not answer the census question.

Of those at least 15 years old, 9 (9.7%) people had a bachelor's or higher degree, 45 (48.4%) had a post-high school certificate or diploma, and 36 (38.7%) people exclusively held high school qualifications. The median income was $25,100, compared with $41,500 nationally. 3 people (3.2%) earned over $100,000 compared to 12.1% nationally. The employment status of those at least 15 was that 33 (35.5%) people were employed full-time, 9 (9.7%) were part-time, and 6 (6.5%) were unemployed.

=== Herekino-Takahue statistical area ===
Herekino-Takahue statistical area covers 303.89 km^{2} (117.33 sq mi) and also includes Manukau North, Whangapē Harbour and Takahue. It had an estimated population of 1,210 as of June 2025, with a population density of 4.0 people per km^{2}.

Historical population for Herekino-Takahue statistical area
Year	Pop.	±% p.a.
2006	966	—
2013	927	−0.59%
2018	963	+0.76%
2023	1,140	+3.43%

Herekino-Takahue had a population of 1,140 in the 2023 New Zealand census, an increase of 177 people (18.4%) since the 2018 census, and an increase of 213 people (23.0%) since the 2013 census. There were 594 males, 540 females and 3 people of other genders in 408 dwellings. 1.6% of people identified as LGBTIQ+. The median age was 44.6 years (compared with 38.1 years nationally). There were 231 people (20.3%) aged under 15 years, 189 (16.6%) aged 15 to 29, 504 (44.2%) aged 30 to 64, and 216 (18.9%) aged 65 or older.

People could identify as more than one ethnicity. The results were 63.4% European (Pākehā); 57.4% Māori; 3.7% Pasifika; 2.1% Asian; 0.8% Middle Eastern, Latin American and African New Zealanders (MELAA); and 2.1% other, which includes people giving their ethnicity as "New Zealander". English was spoken by 97.4%, Māori language by 17.6%, Samoan by 0.5% and other languages by 4.5%. No language could be spoken by 1.8% (e.g. too young to talk). New Zealand Sign Language was known by 0.5%. The percentage of people born overseas was 10.8, compared with 28.8% nationally.

Religious affiliations were 37.4% Christian, 0.3% Hindu, 0.3% Islam, 3.7% Māori religious beliefs, 1.1% Buddhist, 0.8% New Age, and 0.8% other religions. People who answered that they had no religion were 45.8%, and 10.5% of people did not answer the census question.

Of those at least 15 years old, 87 (9.6%) people had a bachelor's or higher degree, 522 (57.4%) had a post-high school certificate or diploma, and 273 (30.0%) people exclusively held high school qualifications. The median income was $26,600, compared with $41,500 nationally. 30 people (3.3%) earned over $100,000 compared to 12.1% nationally. The employment status of those at least 15 was that 333 (36.6%) people were employed full-time, 147 (16.2%) were part-time, and 63 (6.9%) were unemployed.

== History and culture ==
=== Pre-European history ===
Herekino was named by the Māori chief Tohe, who passed through on the way to visit the local chief Taunaha at Owhata and noticed a lasso-type of bird trap which had been incorrectly tied, which would cause the prey unnecessary suffering. He named the area Herekino-a-Taunaha (the false knot of Taunaha).

Ngāti Ruānui (now Te Aupōuri) dominated the Herekino and Whangape harbours and several battles were fought against other iwi in the area before European settlement.

=== European settlement ===
In 1846, the brig H.M.S. Osprey mistook the Herekino Heads with the entrance to the Hokianga, about 30 km to the south, due to misty weather and the similarity of the two features – both have a northern head formed by sand dunes. The Osprey was driven ashore on the shallow sand bank just north of the headland. There were no deaths. Wreckage is still visible. Herekino was named on some charts as "False Hokianga" due to the similarity of the entrances.

Dalmatian immigrants were growing grapes in Herekino by the late 1890s and by 1906, there were 14 vineyards.

In the mid 1960s Herekino was a small township with shops – a butcher, a petrol station and more. However following the sealing of State Highway 1 through the Mangamuka Gorge to Kaitaia, the township quickly declined.

=== Marae ===
Herekino has one marae, affiliated with Ngāti Kurī: Rangikohu Marae and Ruia te Aroha meeting house.

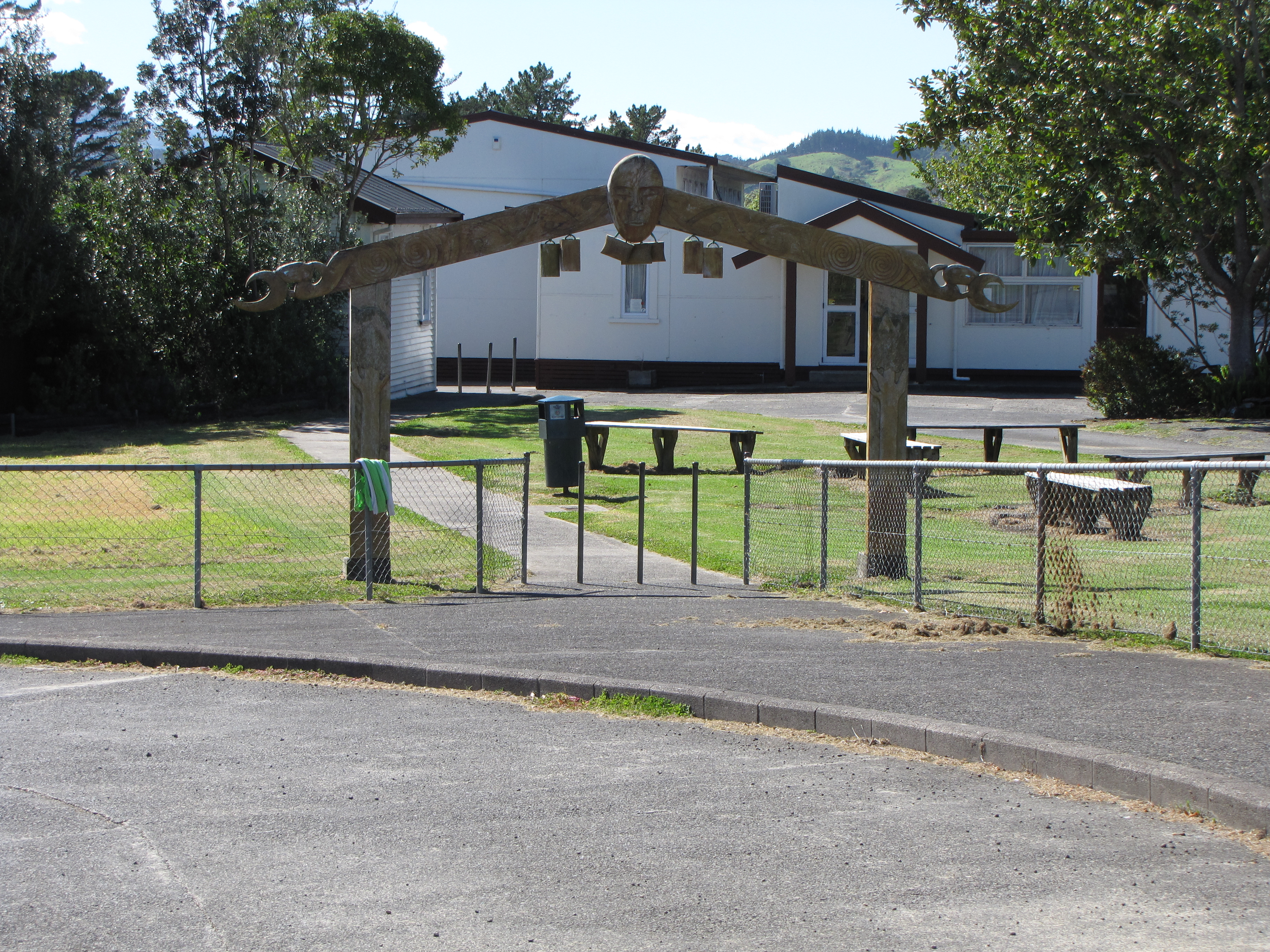
Herekino School

In October 2020, the Government committed $1,407,731 from the Provincial Growth Fund to upgrade the two marae and 7 other Te Rarawa marae, creating 100 jobs.

== Education ==
Herekino School is a coeducational full primary (years 1–8) school with a roll of 23 students as of July 2026. The school was established in 1888. A fire destroyed the first building in 1909, and its replacement also burned down in 1944.

== Notes ==
Media related to Herekino at Wikimedia Commons
