= Omanaia River =

Coordinates: 35°25′S 173°30′E

Location
- Country: New Zealand

Physical characteristics
- Mouth
  - location: Hokianga Harbour
- Length: 14 km (8.7 mi)

The Omanaia River is a river of the Northland Region of New Zealand's North Island. It flows northwest from the Waima Forest, first as a stream and then as a silty arm of the Hokianga Harbour. The township of Rawene stands at the point where the river meets the main waters of the harbour.

== See also ==
- List of rivers of New Zealand
