= Wairere River =

Coordinates: 35°22′S 173°35′E

Location
- Country: New Zealand

Physical characteristics
- Mouth
  - location: Waihou River
- Length: 12 km (7.5 mi)

The Wairere River or Wairere Stream is a river of the Northland Region of New Zealand's North Island. It flows northwest to reach the Waihou River, an arm of the Hokianga Harbour.

== See also ==
- List of rivers of New Zealand
