= Whakanekeneke River =

Coordinates: 35°18′S 173°45′E

Location
- Country: New Zealand

Physical characteristics
- Mouth
  - location: Waihou River
- Length: 21 km (13 mi)

The Whakanekeneke River is a river of the Northland Region of New Zealand's North Island. It flows generally west from its origins north of Lake Ōmāpere, and flows into the Waihou River, an arm of the Hokianga Harbour.

== See also ==
- List of rivers of New Zealand
