= Whangapē Harbour =

Harbour in Northland, New Zealand

- Whangapē (Māori)
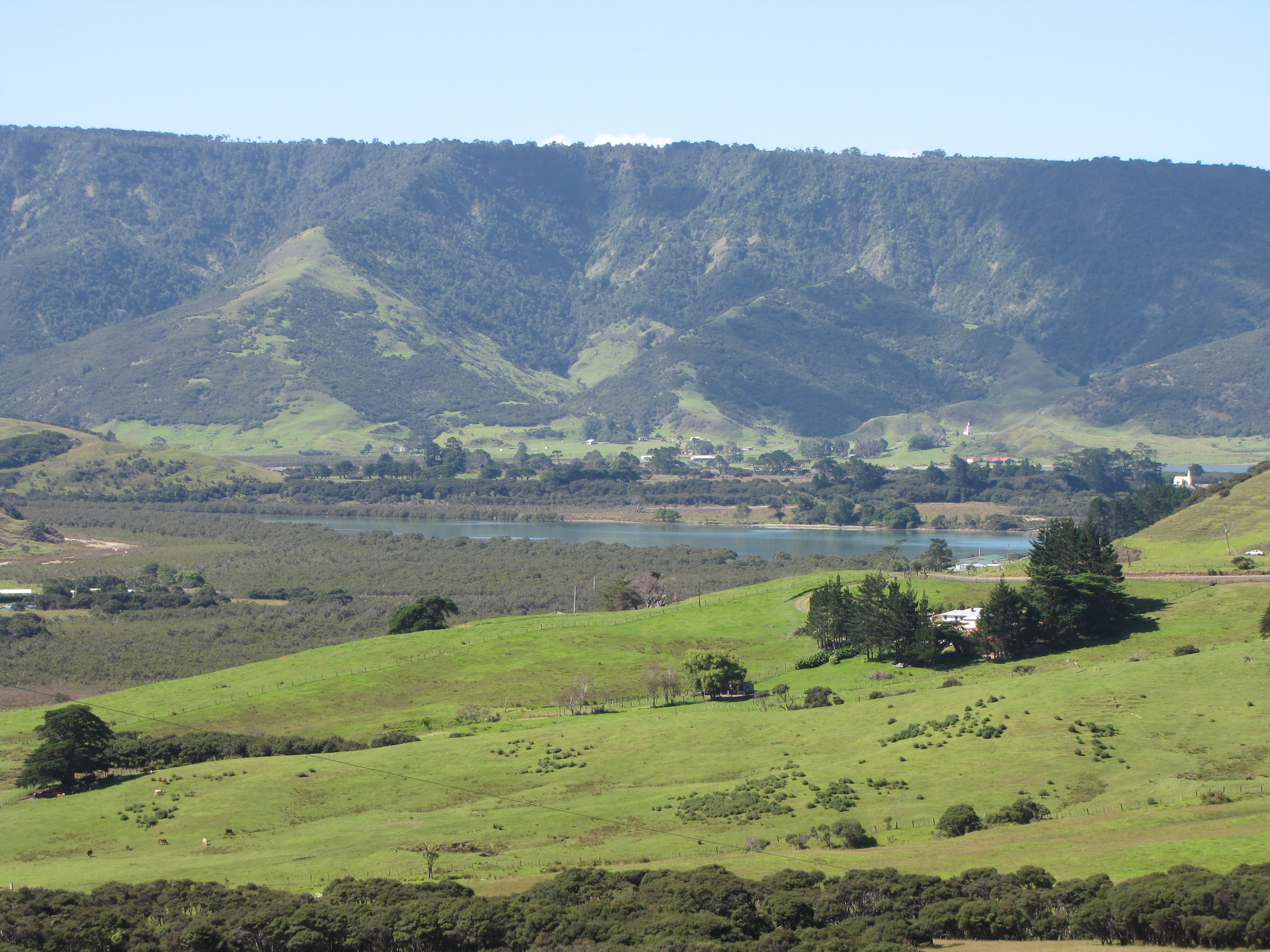
- Whangapē Harbour

- Whangapē Harbour is in the Northland Region of New Zealand
- Location: Northland, New Zealand
- Coordinates: 35°21′0″S 173°14′0″E
- Primary inflows: Awaroa River and Rotokakahi River
- Primary outflows: Tasman Sea
- Settlements: Whangape, Pawarenga

Whangapē Harbour is a harbour on the west coast of Northland, New Zealand. There is a settlement called Whangapē on the northern side of the harbour. Another, called Pawarenga, is located on the southern side. Kaitaia is 42 km north east.

The harbour is a narrow valley from the confluence of the Awaroa and Rotokakahi Rivers through hills to the Tasman Sea. The harbour entrance is treacherous. The Herekino Harbour and settlement are a few kilometres to the north, and the Hokianga is to the south and east.

== History and culture ==
=== Pre-European history ===
According to Māori traditions, the waka Māmari, captained by Ruānui, settled the Whangapē area after being forced out of the Hokianga during early Māori settlement of New Zealand. They established a large fortified pā at Pawarenga. Here they were attacked by a war party from the south, which greatly outnumbered them. The Ngāti Ruānui stacked brushwood about the pa, and set them alight before fleeing across the harbour on rafts, hidden by the clouds of smoke produced. They settled much of the far north, becoming known as Te Aupōuri ('au' means current and 'pōuri' smoke) after this event.

Edward Wakefield described the harbour in 1837, and estimated the local Māori population as "not fewer than one thousand souls".

=== European settlement ===
Whangapē settlement became an important timber port in the late 19th and early 20th century. There was a large mill on the foreshore and numerous houses on the hills. Ships, initially sailing ships and later steamers, loaded the kauri timber and transported it to markets elsewhere. At least four ships were wrecked at the harbour entrance: the 79-ton schooner Leonidas in 1871, the 15-ton cutter Lionel in 1877 with all five on board lost, the 108-ton schooner Geelong in 1879 with two lives lost, and most recently the River Hunter foundered in 1906 while under tow. Whangapē was a location for the late 19th/early 20th century kauri gum digging trade.

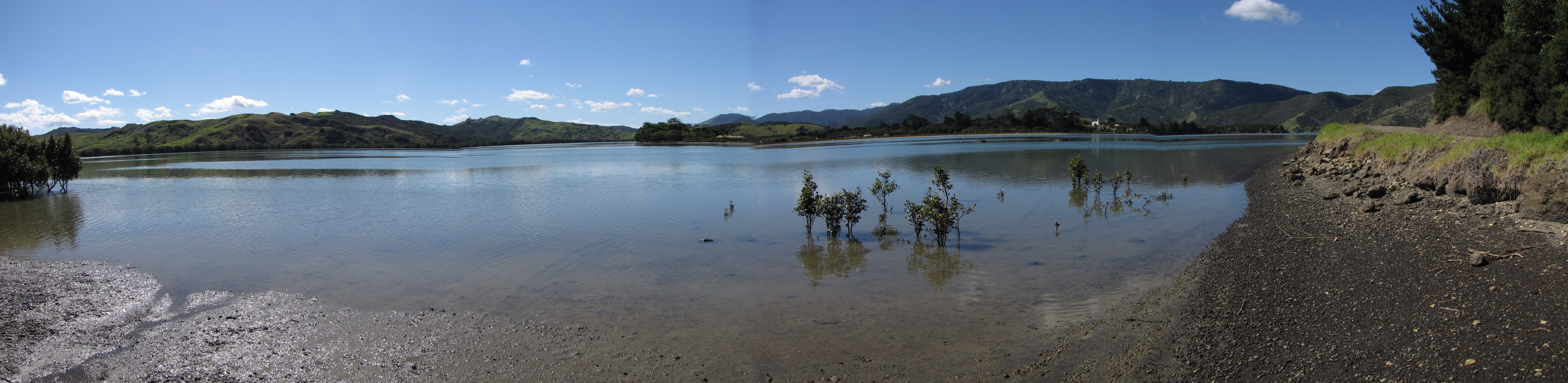
Panorama of Whangapē Harbour

=== Marae ===
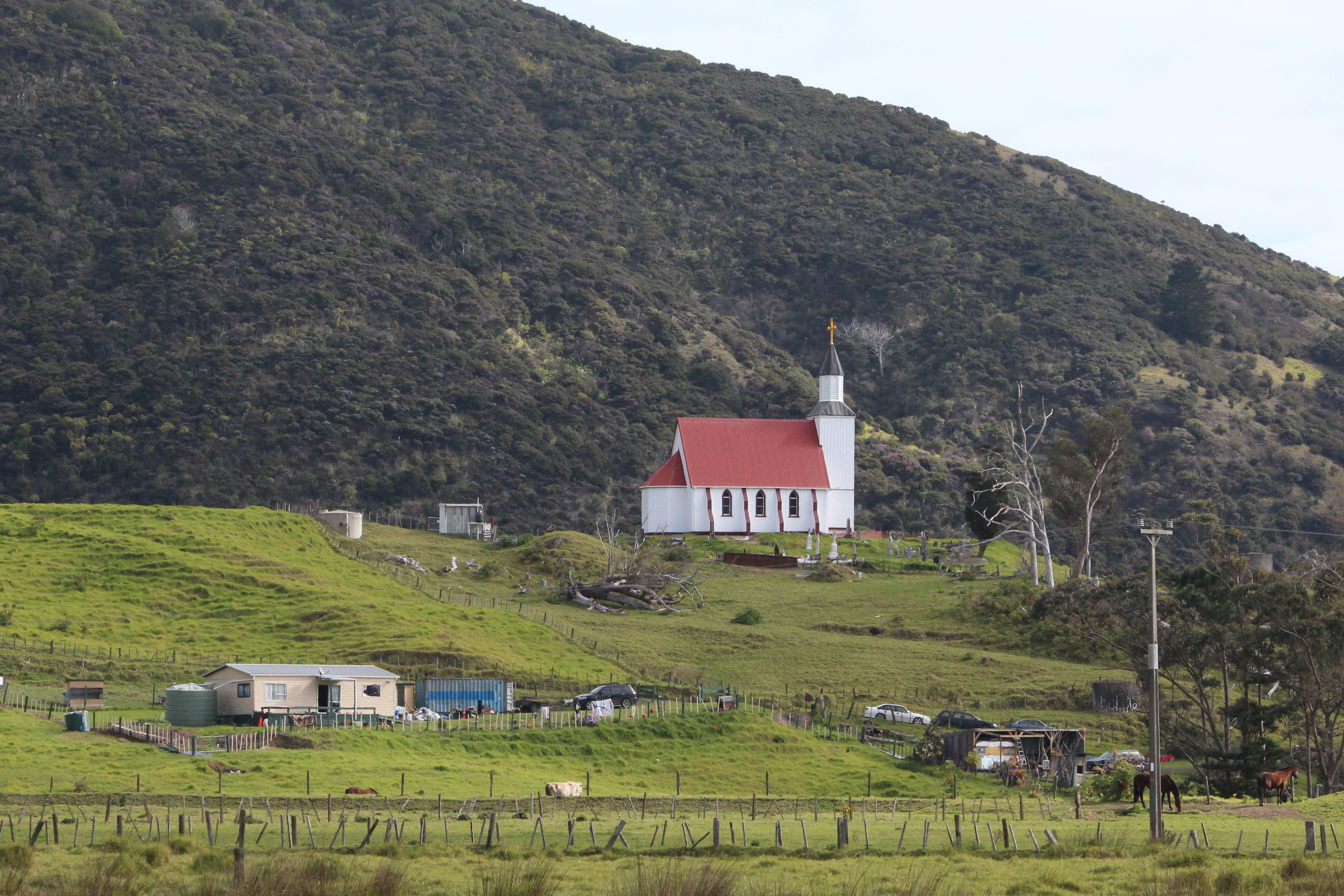
St Gabriel's Church overlooks one of the marae at Pawarenga

Pawarenga has three marae affiliated with Te Uri o Tai, a hapū of Te Rarawa: Mōrehu Marae and Kurahaupō meeting house; Ōhākī Marae and Te Urunga Moutonu or Maru o te Huia meeting house; and Taiao Marae and Mataatua meeting house. In October 2020, the Government committed $1,407,731 from the Provincial Growth Fund to upgrade Ōhākī Marae and 8 other marae of Te Rarawa, creating 100 jobs. It also committed $217,455 to upgrade Mataatua Marae, creating 14 jobs.

Whangapē has one marae, Te Kotahitanga. It is affiliated with the Ngāpuhi hapū of Ngāti Kura, Ngāti Tautahi, Ngāti Whakaeke, Takoto Kē and Te Uri o Hua. In October 2020, the Government committed $90,424 to upgrade both it and Te Maata Marae, creating 12 jobs. It also committed $1,407,731 towards work on Te Kotahitanga and eight other marae.

== Demographics ==
The SA1 statistical area on the north side of the harbour, which includes Whangape, covers 56.45 km^{2} (21.80 sq mi). The SA1 area is part of the larger Herekino-Takahue statistical area.

Historical population
Year	Pop.	±% p.a.
2006	117	—
2013	99	−2.36%
2018	96	−0.61%
2023	117	+4.04%

The SA1 statistical area had a population of 117 in the 2023 New Zealand census, an increase of 21 people (21.9%) since the 2018 census, and an increase of 18 people (18.2%) since the 2013 census. There were 60 males and 54 females in 45 dwellings. The median age was 48.5 years (compared with 38.1 years nationally). There were 24 people (20.5%) aged under 15 years, 15 (12.8%) aged 15 to 29, 42 (35.9%) aged 30 to 64, and 36 (30.8%) aged 65 or older.

People could identify as more than one ethnicity. The results were 35.9% European (Pākehā), 79.5% Māori, 7.7% Pasifika, and 2.6% Asian. English was spoken by 100.0%, Māori language by 25.6%, Samoan by 2.6% and other languages by 5.1%. The percentage of people born overseas was 5.1, compared with 28.8% nationally.

Religious affiliations were 61.5% Christian, and 7.7% Māori religious beliefs. People who answered that they had no religion were 23.1%, and 12.8% of people did not answer the census question.

Of those at least 15 years old, 9 (9.7%) people had a bachelor's or higher degree, 60 (64.5%) had a post-high school certificate or diploma, and 33 (35.5%) people exclusively held high school qualifications. The median income was $24,100, compared with $41,500 nationally. 3 people (3.2%) earned over $100,000 compared to 12.1% nationally. The employment status of those at least 15 was that 18 (19.4%) people were employed full-time, 12 (12.9%) were part-time, and 12 (12.9%) were unemployed.

== Education ==
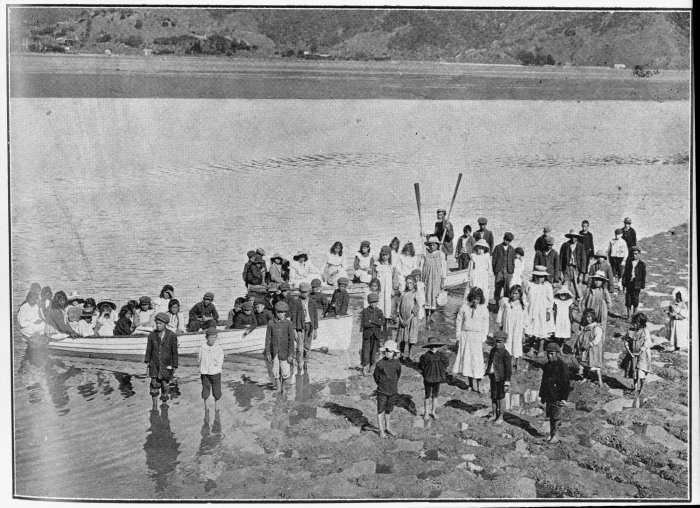
Whangapē Native School Ferry, about 1906

Te Kura ā Iwi o Pawarenga is a coeducational full primary school serving years 1–8. It had a roll of 12 students as of March 2026. The school was founded in 2020 to replace Te Kura o Hata Maria o Pawarenga. It is a state kura-ā-iwi designated character school, which teaches primarily in the Māori language.

Whangapē Native School operated from 1881 to 1976, when it merged with Herekino School. Puketi and Makora Schools operated from 1894 to 1896.

Rotokakahi Native School (later called Rotokakahi Maori School) operated from 1918 to about 1969 on the harbour.

Te Kura o Hata Maria o Pawarenga was a Catholic primary school, founded in 1927. It subsequently became state-integrated, but closed in 2020 and was replaced by Te Kura ā Iwi o Pawarenga.
