= Motuti River =

Coordinates: 35°24′S 173°25′E

Location
- Country: New Zealand

Physical characteristics
- Mouth
  - location: Hokianga Harbour

The Motuti River is a short, wide river in the Northland Region of New Zealand's North Island. More a silty arm of the Hokianga Harbour than a true river, it flows south from the settlement of Motuti to the main channel of the Hokianga 10 kilometres (6 mi) west of Rawene.

== See also ==
- List of rivers of New Zealand
