= Manukau North =

Coordinates: 35.235°S 173.214°E

Manukau, also known as Manukau North to distinguish it from other areas, is a locality in the North Island of New Zealand.

== Geography ==
Topographic map of Manukau North

Manukau is part of the eponymous 9,280 acres (3,760 ha) block, with some of it held as Māori freehold land (collectively owned land). The Manukau Block includes the commercial Herekino Forest (Note: Not to be confused with the Herekino Forest Conservation Park).

Manukau is the site of the Whinau Pah and a trig station.

== History ==
Issues of ownership and sales of the Manukau Block led to a 1908 Native Land Commission report that recommended an end to private sales; however, issues continued and local Maori went to the commission later that same year with claims that settlement and agricultural sites had been included in land sales despite an agreement to exclude such sites. Further sales continued in 1914 with Auckland buyers purchasing land for agricultural purposes. These purchases were also contested and in 1916 the Native Land Court with the court ruling on the return of 105 acres (42 ha) and compensation for Maori who had not agreed with the sale of land. In 1933 83 acres (34 ha) was subdivided as part of the Māori Land Development Scheme.

In 1926 the Manukau Native School was established. Two years later the school had a second teacher. The school initially operated out of an old hall but a purpose built schoolhouse and teacher's residence were constructed in 1934.

== Demographics ==
Manukau locality covers 75.94 km^{2} (29.32 sq mi). It is part of the Herekino-Takahue statistical area.

Historical population
Year	Pop.	±% p.a.
2006	129	—
2013	123	−0.68%
2018	144	+3.20%
2023	165	+2.76%

Manuaku had a population of 165 in the 2023 New Zealand census, an increase of 21 people (14.6%) since the 2018 census, and an increase of 42 people (34.1%) since the 2013 census. There were 93 males and 72 females in 54 dwellings. The median age was 36.2 years (compared with 38.1 years nationally). There were 45 people (27.3%) aged under 15 years, 27 (16.4%) aged 15 to 29, 66 (40.0%) aged 30 to 64, and 24 (14.5%) aged 65 or older.

People could identify as more than one ethnicity. The results were 38.2% European (Pākehā), 83.6% Māori, 1.8% Pasifika, and 3.6% other, which includes people giving their ethnicity as "New Zealander". English was spoken by 96.4%, and Māori by 29.1%. No language could be spoken by 3.6% (e.g. too young to talk). The percentage of people born overseas was 3.6, compared with 28.8% nationally.

Religious affiliations were 32.7% Christian, and 7.3% Māori religious beliefs. People who answered that they had no religion were 49.1%, and 12.7% of people did not answer the census question.

Of those at least 15 years old, 12 (10.0%) people had a bachelor's or higher degree, 78 (65.0%) had a post-high school certificate or diploma, and 24 (20.0%) people exclusively held high school qualifications. The median income was $29,100, compared with $41,500 nationally. The employment status of those at least 15 was 42 (35.0%) full-time, 18 (15.0%) part-time, and 9 (7.5%) unemployed.
