= Motukaraka =

Farming locality in New Zealand

- Farming locality
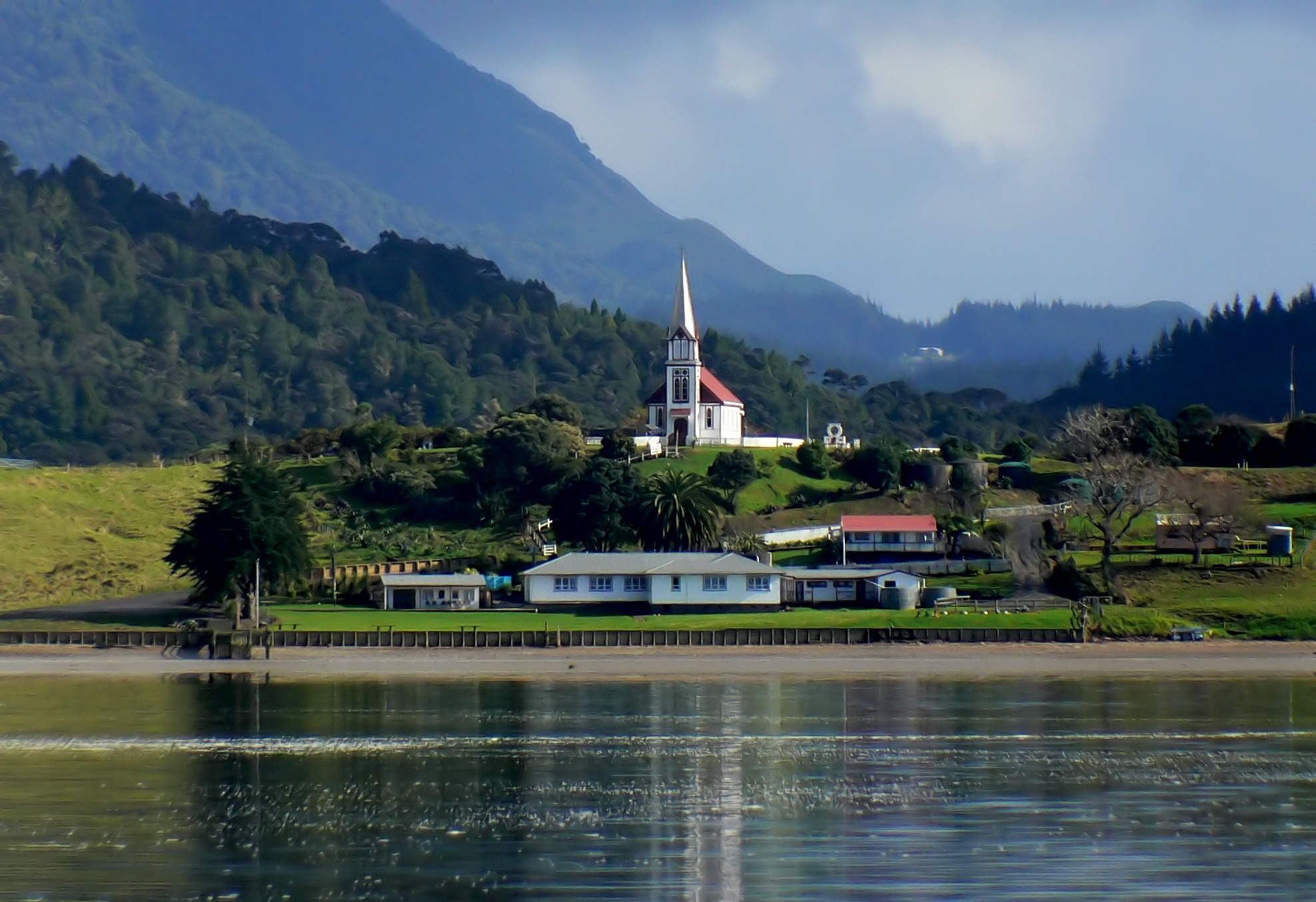
- Motukaraka Point, with the Church of Our Lady of the Assumption in the centre
- Interactive map of Motukaraka
- Country: New Zealand
- Region: Northland Region
- Territorial authority: Far North District
- Ward: Kaikohe-Hokianga general ward; Ngā Tai o Tokerau Māori ward
- Electorates: Northland; Te Tai Tokerau (Māori)

Government
  - Territorial authority: Far North District Council
  - Regional council: Northland Regional Council
  - Mayor of Far North: Moko Tepania
  - Northland MP: Grant McCallum
  - Te Tai Tokerau MP: Mariameno Kapa-Kingi

Motukaraka is a farming locality on the northern shore of Hokianga in the Northland Region of New Zealand.

== Toponymy ==
In the Māori language, 'motu' translates to 'clump of trees' whereas karaka is a species of tree endemic to New Zealand.

== History ==
Early charts from James Herd show Motukaraka as "Moodewy's place," a reference to the Te Popoto rangatira Muriwai.

On 6 August 1907, the Hokianga Co-operative Dairy Company Limited was established. They officially opened a dairy factory in Motukaraka in October 1908. It was complete with a wharf and a railway track. In 1917, the company was producing nearly 300 tons of butter and the factory was running to the full limit of capacity. It was decided to expand the factory and extensions were completed between 1917 and 1918. By 1940, the factory was producing 1887 tons of butter. In 1957, the company underwent voluntary liquidation under a merger with the Bay of Islands, Kaikohe, Waimamaku and Whangaroa co-operative dairy companies.

A Catholic church, the Church of Our Lady of the Assumption, was established in Motukaraka by the same Mill Hill missionaries who were responsible for the revival of Catholic missions in the Diocese of Auckland in the late 19th century. The church was built in a neo-gothic style and it is believed that Thomas Mahoney was the architect. The church was opened in 1910, and in 1990, was recognised as Historic Place Category 1 by Heritage New Zealand. Today, the church is part of a marae.

== Motukaraka Island ==
Motukaraka Island is a 14.16-hectare island located in the Hokianga Harbour, southwest of Motukaraka.

In 2017, the island went up for sale, and local hapū Ngāi Tūpoto set up a GoFundMe page in order to raise funds to purchase the island, which had a land value of $85,000, with the goal of turning it into a public reserve. According to the hapū, the land was a former battlefield. More than $24,000 were raised, including a $15,000 anonymous donation.

== Notable people ==
- Rawiri Paratene (born 1953 or 1954), New Zealand actor and filmmaker
