= Orira River =

Coordinates: 35°20′S 173°34′E

Location
- Country: New Zealand

Physical characteristics
- Mouth
  - location: Hokianga Harbour
- Length: 10 km (6.2 mi)

The Orira River is a river of the Northland Region of New Zealand's North Island. It flows southwest, and for much of its length it is a northwestern arm of the Hokianga Harbour.

== See also ==
- List of rivers of New Zealand
