= Whakarapa River =

Coordinates: 35°25′S 173°23′E

Location
- Country: New Zealand

Physical characteristics
- Mouth
  - location: Hokianga Harbour
- Length: 4 km (2.5 mi)

The Whakarapa River is a river of the Northland Region of New Zealand's North Island. Despite its name, it is probably better described as a northern silty arm of the Hokianga Harbour, which it meets 15 kilometres northeast of the latter's mouth.

== See also ==
- List of rivers of New Zealand
