= Maungataniwha Range =

Mountain range in New Zealand

Coordinates: 35.2012°S 173.4741°E

The Maungataniwha Range is a volcanic mountain range located in Northland Region of New Zealand. The Mangamukas, as it is known by the local residents and many Northlanders because of the name of the settlement and river on the southern side, separates Kaitaia and the Aupouri Peninsula from the rest of Northland. The highest point in the Maungataniwha Ranges is Raetea at 744m. The range is home to many kauri trees and part of the range is a part of Northland Forest Park.

The New Zealand Ministry for Culture and Heritage gives a translation of "taniwha mountain" for Maungataniwha.

State Highway 1 crosses the range and passes through the Mangamuka Gorge. With a summit of 383m, the road is known to be one of the most winding, twisty and hilly section of the entire length of highway in New Zealand. It was built in the 1920s and was sealed in 1961, making it the preferred route from Whangārei to Kaitaia.

In the early 1900s, a railway was proposed to either run through the ranges or run round them to connect Kaitaia and the Far North with the North Auckland Line or the Okaihau Branch line of the national rail network. After much debate, the idea never went ahead and in 1936 the decision was made not to extend the Okaihau Branch to Kaitaia and the extension from Okaihau to Rangiahua was closed.
