= Mangamuka River =

Coordinates: 35°20′S 173°33′E

Location
- Country: New Zealand

Physical characteristics
- Source
  - location: Maungataniwha Range
- Mouth
  - location: Hokianga Harbour
- Length: 22 km (14 mi)

The Mangamuka River is a river of the far north of the Northland Region of New Zealand's North Island. It flows generally south from the Maungataniwha Range southeast of Kaitaia, and the last few kilometres of its length are a wide, silty arm of the Hokianga Harbour, which it reaches 10 kilometres (6 mi) northeast of Rawene.

== See also ==
- List of rivers of New Zealand
