= Hokianga =

Bay in Northland Region, New Zealand

Coordinates: 35.5258°S 173.3786°E

Hokianga is in the Northland Region.

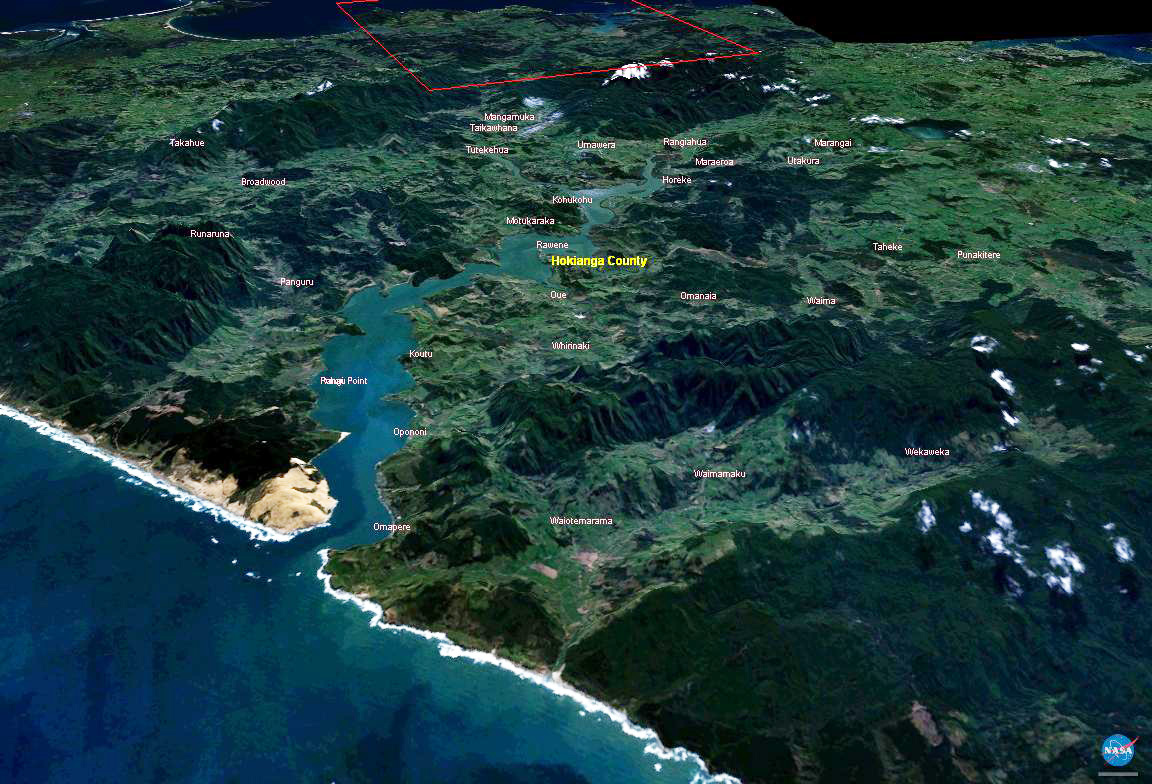
Image of the Hokianga generated by NASA's World Wind program

The Hokianga is an area surrounding the Hokianga Harbour, also known as the Hokianga River, a long estuarine drowned valley on the west coast in the north of the North Island of New Zealand.

The original name, still used by local Māori, is Te Kohanga o Te Tai Tokerau ("the nest of the northern people") or Te Puna o Te Ao Marama ("the wellspring in the world of light"). The full name of the harbour is Te Hokianga-nui-a-Kupe — "the place of Kupe's great return".

== Geography ==
The Hokianga is in the Far North District, which is in the Northland Region. The area is 120 kilometres (75 mi) northwest of Whangārei City—and 40 kilometres (25 mi) west of Kaikohe—by road. The estuary extends inland for 30 kilometres (19 mi) from the Tasman Sea. It is navigable for small craft for much of its length, although there is a bar across the mouth. In its upper reaches the Rangiora Narrows separate the mouths of the Waihou and Mangamuka Rivers from the lower parts of the harbour.

12,000 years ago, the Hokianga was a river valley flanked by steep bush-clad hills. As the last ice age regressed, the dramatic rise in sea level slowly flooded the valley turning it into a tidal saltwater harbour with abundant sheltered deep water anchorages. This was the harbour that the explorer Kupe left from, and in 1822 it was home to the first European timber entrepreneurs. southern right whales possibly frequented the bay historically, prior to significant depletion of the species caused by commercial and illegal hunting. Today, large whales are rarely seen in the bay, although the harbour is a well-regarded area in which to watch smaller dolphins and killer whales.

Numerous small islands dot the Hokianga, notably Ruapapaka Island, Motukaraka Island, and To Motu Island, the latter being the site of a former pā.

=== Arms and inlets ===
As the Hokianga is a drowned valley, it is the mouth of numerous "tributaries", many of which retain the name river while effectively being bays or inlets. Clockwise from the mouth of the Hokianga, these include:

- Whakarapa River
- Motuti River
- Whangapapatiki Creek
- Tapuwae River
- Mangamuka River
- Orira River
- Waihou River
- Wairere River
- Waima River
- Omanaia River
- Whirinaki River

=== Settlements ===
The area around the harbour is divided in three by the estuary. To the south are the settlements of Waimamaku, Ōmāpere, Opononi, Koutu, Whirinaki, Rawene, Omanaia, Waima, and Taheke; to the north are Broadwood, Pawarenga, Panguru and Mitimiti; and at the top of the harbour upstream from the narrows are Horeke, Kohukohu, and Mangamuka.

== History ==
=== Pre-colonial times ===
According to Te Tai Tokerau tradition, Kupe and Ngāhue, the legendary Polynesian navigators and explorers, settled in Hokianga in approximately 925 AD, after their journey of discovery from Hawaiki aboard their waka (canoe) named Matahorua and Tāwhirirangi. When Kupe left the area, he declared that this would be the place of his return, leaving several things behind—including the bailer of his canoe. Later, Kupe's grandson Nukutawhiti returned from Hawaiki to settle in Hokianga.

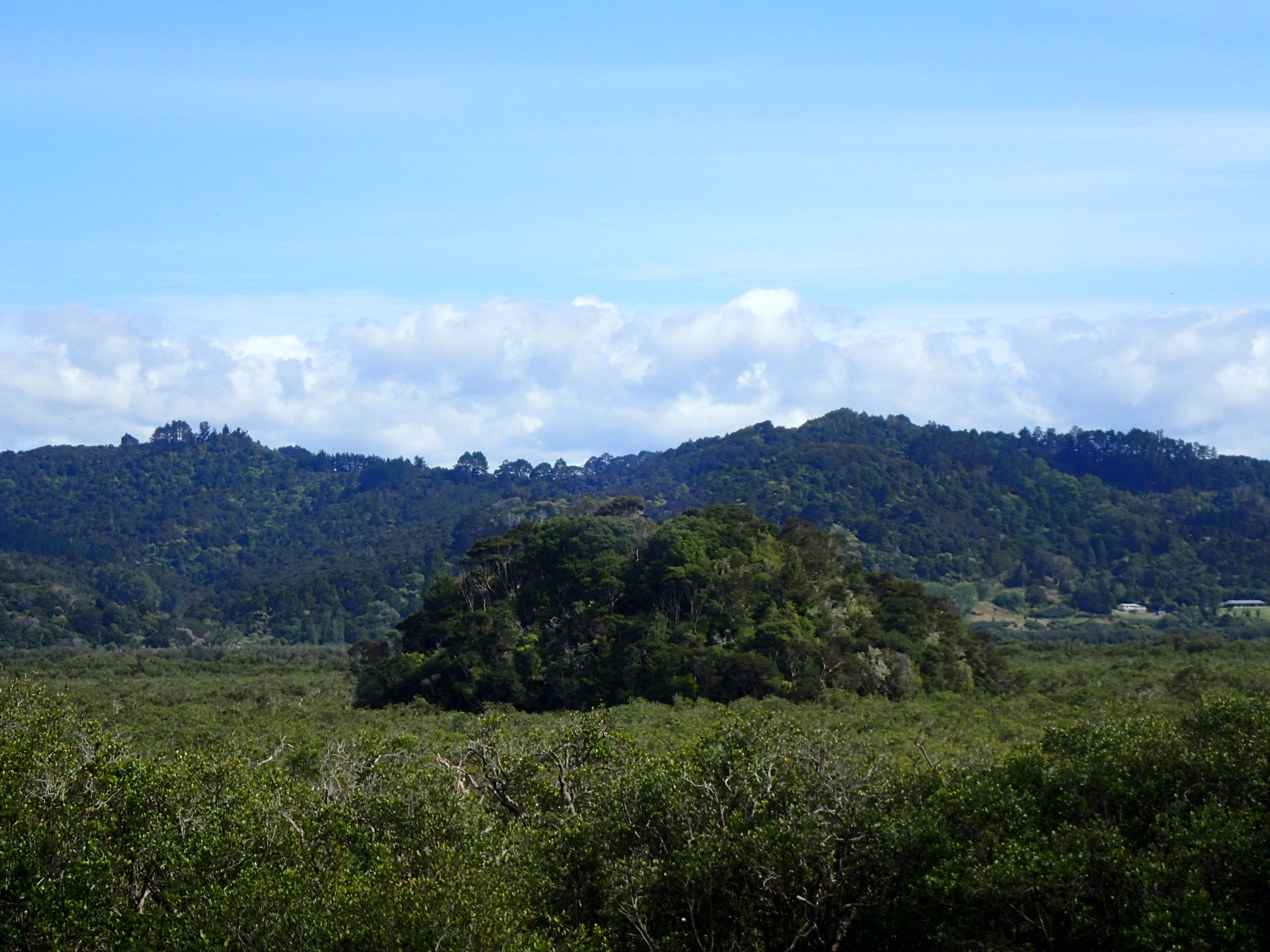
Motukiore Island – where Kupe placed the Kiore on his arrival

In the 14th century, the great chief Puhi landed just south of the Bay of Islands. The tribe of Puhi, Ngāpuhi, slowly extended westwards to reach the west coast and to colonise both sides of Hokianga. Māori regard Hokianga as one of the oldest settlements in Aotearoa, and it remains a heartland for the people. Rahiri, the 17th-century founder of the Ngāpuhi iwi, was born at Whiria pā to the south of the harbour, where a monument stands to his memory.

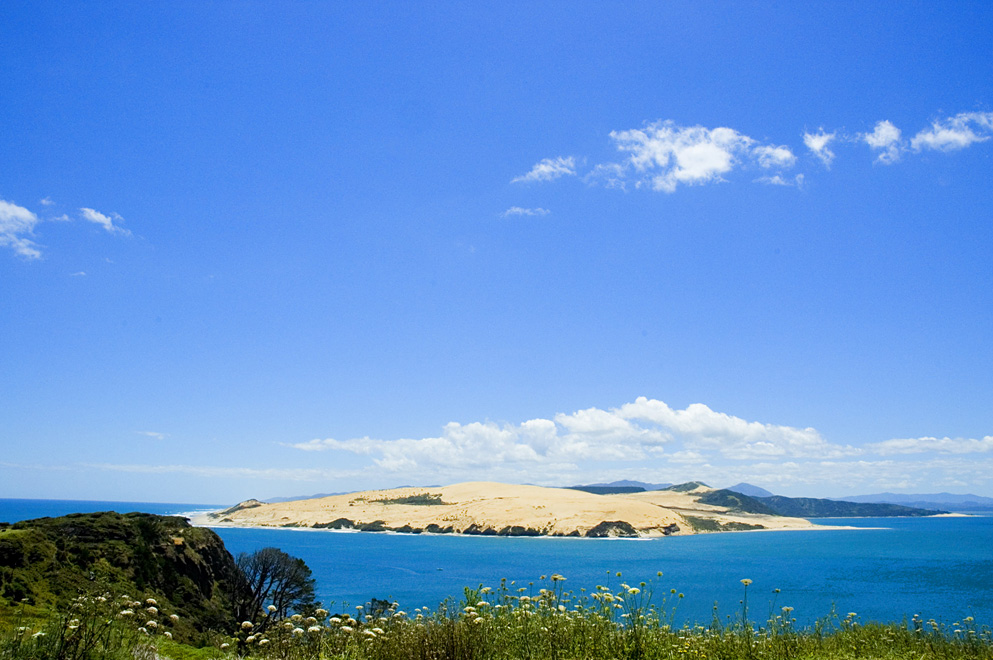
Mouth of the Hokianga Harbour, with the Tasman Sea to the left and Hokianga Harbour to the right

In the course of expansion, Ngāpuhi created and maintained over centuries a complex network of walking tracks, many of which evolved into today's roads.

==== Pā sites ====
More than a dozen pā sites lie close to the Hokianga, among them notably Motukauri Pã, located on a headland at the end of a tombolo between the Motuti River and Whangapapatiki Creek mouths.

=== The arrival of the Europeans ===
Wesleyan (and, later, Anglican) missionaries were guided along the Ngāpuhi walking tracks to make their own discovery of Hokianga and its accessible timber resources. Their reports soon reached merchant captains in the Bay of Islands.

Captain James Herd of the Providence responded first, and with missionary Thomas Kendall as guide and translator, crossed the bar and entered the harbour in 1822. His was the first European ship to do so, and it sailed away with the first shipment of timber from the Hokianga. His success inspired a strong following—the deforestation of Hokianga had begun and would be complete by the turn of the century.

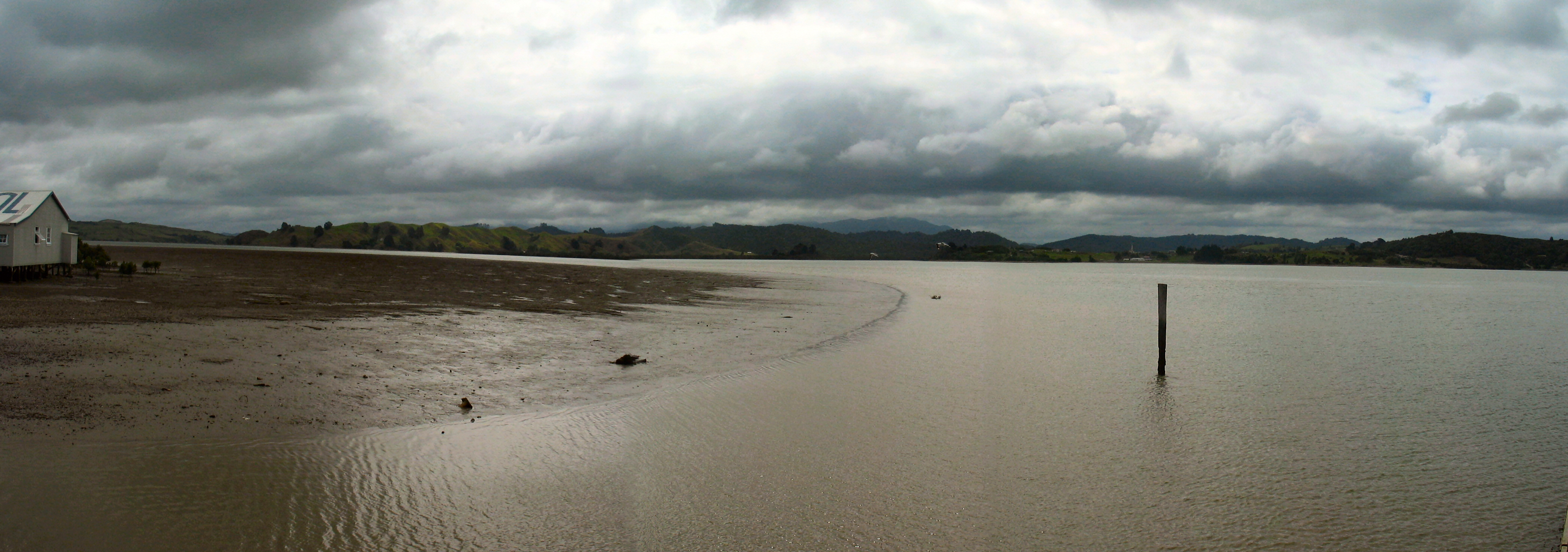
Hokianga Harbour from Rawene

The only disincentive to Hokianga's exploitation was the harbour bar. Among the hundreds of ships that successfully negotiated it, 16 were recorded as being lost. Most came to grief when leaving fully laden, becoming caught in the wind shadow cast by South Head, where deep water lay. A temporary lull or change in wind direction could cause a sailing ship to lose steerage way and be swept onto the rocky shore. In 1828, the missionary schooner Herald, built by Henry Williams and sailed by Gilbert Mair, foundered while trying to enter Hokianga Harbour. The last recorded shipwreck was of the schooner Isabella de Fraine, lost with all eight crew in July 1928 after capsizing on the bar.

In 1837, a French adventurer, the self-titled Baron Charles de Thierry, sailed with 60 settlers into this hive of export activity to claim an immense tract of land that he believed he had purchased 15 years earlier in exchange for 36 axes. He was eventually granted about 1,000 acres (4 km^{2}) at Rangiahua where he set up his colony, declaring himself "Sovereign Chief of New Zealand", a title that failed to endear him to Ngāpuhi. His project collapsed, but it highlighted to the Colonial Service the need to protect against rival European powers.

The year after de Thierry arrived, another Frenchman, Bishop Jean Baptiste Pompallier, arrived, with the aim of establishing a Catholic mission. He found the southern shores firmly in the hands of Methodist and Anglican missionaries, but the northern side was ripe for conversion. His remains, recently claimed by Ngāpuhi, lie buried where the mission began. Today the harbour, like the Reformation itself, stands between Protestant and Catholic.

The lawyer and naturalist Sir Walter Lawry Buller was born in Hokianga in 1838.

Within six days of the Waitangi signing, Governor Hobson, keen to secure full Ngāpuhi support, trekked across to the Māngungu Mission near Horeke where 3000 were waiting. The second signing of the Treaty of Waitangi took place on 12 February 1840. With the appropriate signatures (and a few inappropriate entries) Hobson could immediately claim support from the biggest tribe in the country.

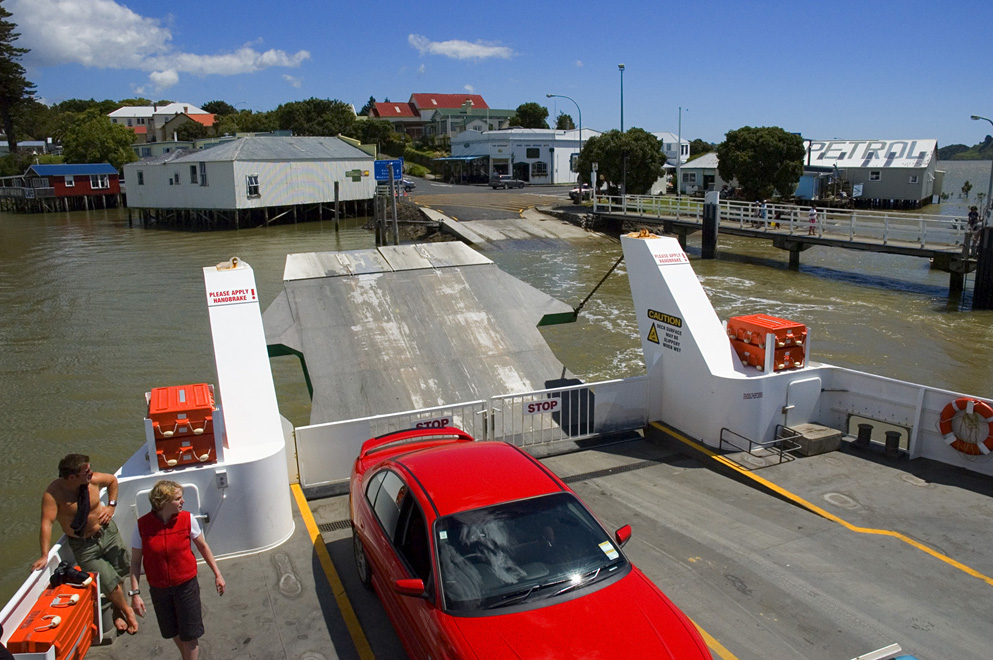
The car ferry at Rawene

While the fate of the country was being signed into history, the axemen of Hokianga scarcely missed a beat. At any one time, as many as 20 ships could be loading Hokianga timber. Whole hillsides, suddenly bared of vegetation, began to slip into the harbour, choking its tributaries with mud.

The relationship between Māori and Pākehā (European) settlers was frequently tense, never more so than during the Dog Tax War of the 1890s, which was largely centred around Hokianga.

By 1900, the bulk of the forest had sailed over the bar and the little topsoil that remained was turned to dairy farming for butter production. Most of the cream delivered to the Motukaraka Dairy Factory was carried there by a fleet of about fifty locally-built launches that criss-crossed the harbour daily, creating in the process a service for both passengers and freight. For half a century, the communities on both sides of the harbour were linked internally by sea transport, before improved roads in the 1950s finally displaced this energetic flotilla and the harbour once again divided the community.

By 1914, a rustic telephone system linked some of the Hokianga communities with each other and with the outside world. A government-subsidised, weekly coastal shipping service ran between Onehunga and Hokianga, bringing in freight and taking away butter.

The communities of Horeke and Rawene are the second- and third-oldest European settlements in New Zealand. Rawene is still the most important of the coastal settlements in the Hokianga and is where the base of Hokianga's community owned health services (Hauora Hokianga) is located, on top of the hill at the Hokianga Hospital.

=== 1918 influenza pandemic ===
The influenza pandemic reached Hokianga in September 1918, and remote Waiotemarama was one of the first settlements to succumb. A soup kitchen was organised in each community. On the instructions of George McCall Smith, the Surgeon Superintendent of Rawene Hospital, mounted and armed guards stood at all crossroads to turn back would-be visitors and thus restrict the spread of the disease between settlements. Travellers wishing to enter Hokianga were stopped at the boundary. The rule was simple: anyone could leave, but no one could enter.

The local epidemic lasted six weeks and a significant number died. Each community attended to its own, and mass burials were commonplace. Few Maori deaths were recorded; the true impact of the epidemic on Maori is unknown.

== Industry ==
The first major industry of the region was based around the kauri trees, both logging and the gum, the strong thick resin which came from the trees. After the forests started to thin, dairying and cheese production took over as the mainstay of the economy, but they too fell away after the closure of the Motukaraka Dairy Cooperative in 1953. For a while during the 1970s and 1980s, there was little economic base for the area, and it became a haven for alternative lifestylers.

In recent years, however, tourism has been revived in the region. Attractions such as the great kauri trees of the Waipoua Forest (including the country's largest tree, Tane Mahuta), the historic waterfront villages of Kohukohu and Rawene, cafes, the Horeke basalts, beaches, historic buildings, nature walks, horse trekking, boat trips, and fishing bring more visitors every year. In 2002, the first walking tracks were opened at the Wairere Boulders allowing a close inspection of the basalt rocks in the Wairere valley.

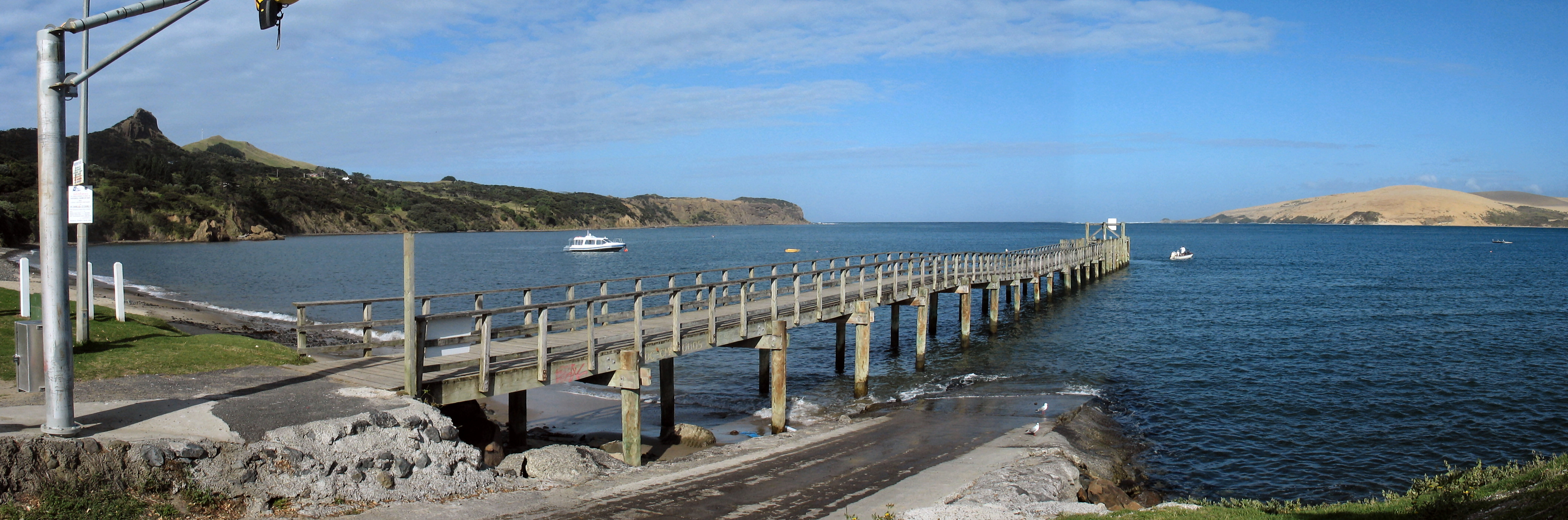
Omapere wharf

== Notable people ==
Several iconic and very different figures in New Zealand history have been closely associated with the Hokianga.

=== Frederick Edward Maning ===
Maning arrived in the Hokianga area at age 22, on 30 June 1833, and lived among the Ngāpuhi Māori. Maning was tall, strong, a good fighter, good-humoured, and sensitive to local power relationships and personalities. He became the esteemed possession of the local war chief and a Pākehā Māori (a European turned native). During the signing process of the Treaty of Waitangi in 1840, Maning acted as a translator and advised the local Māori not to sign the treaty. He wrote two books, Old New Zealand and A history of the war in the north of New Zealand against the chief Heke, which are now regarded as classics of New Zealand literature.

=== Sir Walter Lawry Buller ===
Sir Walter Lawry Buller KCMG was born in Pakanae in the Hokianga, in October 1838, the son of Rev. James Buller, a Cornish missionary who had helped convert the people of Tonga to Methodism. He became a lawyer and naturalist, a dominant figure in New Zealand ornithology. His book A History of the Birds of New Zealand was first published in 1873. He died in England in July 1906.

=== Whina Cooper ===
Whina Cooper was born at Te Karaka, Hokianga on 9 December 1895, the daughter of a leader of the Te Rarawa iwi.

From an early age she showed an interest in local community affairs and politics, and her flair and abilities led to her becoming the undisputed Māori leader of the northern Hokianga by her mid-30s.

In 1949 she moved to Auckland, and by 1951 she was elected first president of the new Māori Women's Welfare League. The league's success was largely due to Whina's efforts, and she became well known throughout the country. In 1957 she stepped down as president and the annual conference rewarded her with the title Te Whaea o te Motu ("Mother of the Nation").

Whina Cooper continued to work for the community throughout the 1960s, but it was her 1975 leadership of a hīkoi – a symbolic march – to protest against the loss of Māori land for which she is known. The march, from the northern tip of the North Island to Parliament in Wellington at the other end of the island made her nationally recognised, with her figure, described as possessing mana and determination, walking at the head of the march from Te Hapua to Wellington.

She was made a DBE in 1981 and a member of the Order of New Zealand in 1991. She had returned to Panguru in the Hokianga in 1983. She died there on 26 March 1994 at the age of 98.

=== Jean Baptiste Pompallier ===
Bishop Jean Baptiste Pompallier (1802–1871), was the first Roman Catholic bishop in New Zealand. His first mission station was situated at Pūrākau in the Hokianga from 1839 until 1915. He celebrated the first mass on NZ 'terra firma' at Tōtara Point, Hokianga, in 1838. His remains were reinterred in Motuti, Hokianga, in 2002 after a nationwide hīkoi.

=== Opo the dolphin ===
Opononi became famous throughout New Zealand during 1955 and 1956 due to the exploits of a bottlenose dolphin (nicknamed "Opo"). Opo was a wild dolphin who started following fishing boats around Opononi in early 1955 after her mother had been killed, and would swim daily in the bay close to town. She was originally named "Opononi Jack", based on Pelorus Jack, since she was presumed to be male. Unlike the majority of dolphins, she had no qualms about human company, and would perform stunts for locals, play with objects like beach balls and beer bottles, and allow children to swim alongside her and make contact.

The dolphin became a local celebrity but news of her soon spread, and visitors from throughout the country would come to watch her. On 8 March 1956 official protection for Opo, requested by locals, was made law, but on 9 March she was found dead in a rock crevice at Koutu Point. It is suspected that she was killed accidentally by fishermen fishing with gelignite. Her death was reported nationwide, and she was buried with full Māori honours in a special plot next to the town hall.

== Education ==
There are composite (years 1–15) schools at Opononi, Panguru and Broadwood.

There are also primary schools at Mangamuka, Horeke, Kohukohu, Matihetihe, Omanaia, Pawarenga, Rawene, Waimā, Whirinaki, and Umawera.

== See also ==
- Weller brothers
