= Kapiro =

Locality in New Zealand

- Interactive map of Kapiro
- Coordinates: 35.183°S 173.908°E
- Country: New Zealand
- Region: Northland Region
- District: Far North District
- Ward: Bay of Islands-Whangaroa
- Community: Bay of Islands-Whangaroa
- Subdivision: Waipapa
- Electorates: Northland; Te Tai Tokerau

Government
  - Territorial Authority: Far North District Council
  - Regional council: Northland Regional Council
  - Mayor of Far North: Moko Tepania
  - Northland MP: Grant McCallum
  - Te Tai Tokerau MP: Mariameno Kapa-Kingi

Area
  - Total: 2.35 km^{2} (0.91 sq mi)

Population (2023 Census)
  - Total: 162
  - Density: 68.9/km^{2} (179/sq mi)

Kapiro is a locality in the Far North District of Northland, New Zealand. State Highway 10 passes through Kapiro. Waipapa is 2.7 km south, and Kaeo is 19 km northwest, by road.

== History ==
The Kapiro block was a designated Kauri gum reserve after 1898 to restrict the harvesting of gum. The gum was depleted by 1919, and suggestions were made to use the land for settlement of returning soldiers from World War I, or planting trees on it. The land was covered with a noxious weed, hakea.

An experimental farm was established in the late 1920s. This was not promising at first, but by the mid 1940s the experiment was much more successful. Kapiro became a rich dairying area.

A vineyard was established from 2007.

== Demographics ==
The SA1 statistical area which includes Kapiro covers 2.35 km^{2} (0.91 sq mi). The SA1 area is part of the larger Lake Manuwai-Kapiro statistical area.

Historical population for Kapiro and surrounds
| Year | Pop. | ±% p.a. |
|---|---|---|
| 2013 | 156 | — |
| 2018 | 156 | +0.00% |
| 2023 | 162 | +0.76% |

The SA1 statistical area had a population of 162 in the 2023 New Zealand census, an increase of 6 people (3.8%) since the 2018 census, and an increase of 6 people (3.8%) since the 2013 census. There were 78 males and 84 females in 63 dwellings. 1.9% of people identified as LGBTIQ+. The median age was 53.0 years (compared with 38.1 years nationally). There were 21 people (13.0%) aged under 15 years, 24 (14.8%) aged 15 to 29, 75 (46.3%) aged 30 to 64, and 45 (27.8%) aged 65 or older.

People could identify as more than one ethnicity. The results were 87.0% European (Pākehā), 14.8% Māori, and 1.9% Asian. English was spoken by 98.1%, Māori language by 1.9%, and other languages by 3.7%. No language could be spoken by 1.9% (e.g. too young to talk). The percentage of people born overseas was 20.4, compared with 28.8% nationally.

Religious affiliations were 25.9% Christian. People who answered that they had no religion were 68.5%, and 3.7% of people did not answer the census question.

Of those at least 15 years old, 30 (21.3%) people had a bachelor's or higher degree, 75 (53.2%) had a post-high school certificate or diploma, and 33 (23.4%) people exclusively held high school qualifications. The median income was $38,500, compared with $41,500 nationally. 12 people (8.5%) earned over $100,000 compared to 12.1% nationally. The employment status of those at least 15 was that 69 (48.9%) people were employed full-time, 15 (10.6%) were part-time, and 3 (2.1%) were unemployed.

=== Lake Manuwai-Kapiro statistical area ===
The statistical area of Lake Manuwai-Kapiro, which includes the area around Lake Manuwai, covers 58.85 km^{2} (22.72 sq mi) and had an estimated population of 2,430 as of June 2025, with a population density of 41 people per km^{2}.

Historical population for Lake Manuwai-Kapiro
| Year | Pop. | ±% p.a. |
|---|---|---|
| 2006 | 1,644 | — |
| 2013 | 1,896 | +2.06% |
| 2018 | 2,133 | +2.38% |
| 2023 | 2,322 | +1.71% |

Lake Manuwai-Kapiro had a population of 2,322 in the 2023 New Zealand census, an increase of 189 people (8.9%) since the 2018 census, and an increase of 426 people (22.5%) since the 2013 census. There were 1,152 males and 1,170 females in 825 dwellings. 2.1% of people identified as LGBTIQ+. The median age was 45.0 years (compared with 38.1 years nationally). There were 438 people (18.9%) aged under 15 years, 336 (14.5%) aged 15 to 29, 1,083 (46.6%) aged 30 to 64, and 462 (19.9%) aged 65 or older.

People could identify as more than one ethnicity. The results were 89.9% European (Pākehā); 19.9% Māori; 4.0% Pasifika; 3.2% Asian; 0.6% Middle Eastern, Latin American and African New Zealanders (MELAA); and 3.0% other, which includes people giving their ethnicity as "New Zealander". English was spoken by 97.7%, Māori language by 3.0%, and other languages by 8.7%. No language could be spoken by 1.7% (e.g. too young to talk). New Zealand Sign Language was known by 0.4%. The percentage of people born overseas was 23.9, compared with 28.8% nationally.

Religious affiliations were 23.0% Christian, 0.1% Islam, 0.4% Māori religious beliefs, 1.2% Buddhist, 0.1% New Age, and 2.1% other religions. People who answered that they had no religion were 64.7%, and 8.3% of people did not answer the census question.

Of those at least 15 years old, 309 (16.4%) people had a bachelor's or higher degree, 1,038 (55.1%) had a post-high school certificate or diploma, and 435 (23.1%) people exclusively held high school qualifications. The median income was $37,800, compared with $41,500 nationally. 159 people (8.4%) earned over $100,000 compared to 12.1% nationally. The employment status of those at least 15 was that 912 (48.4%) people were employed full-time, 288 (15.3%) were part-time, and 54 (2.9%) were unemployed.
