= Lake Manuwai =

Lake in New Zealand

- Location within Northland Region
- Location: Northland Region, North Island
- Coordinates: 35.1663°S 173.8619°E
- Basin countries: New Zealand

Lake Manuwai is a lake in the Northland Region of New Zealand. Located near Kerikeri in the Bay of Islands, it is part of the upper Waipapa stream. It is a reservoir created in the 1980s by the Ministry of Works along with Lake Waingaro to supply irrigation to Kerikeri's horticulture industry. In 1990, it was purchased by a cooperative of local horticulturalists and farmers under the name Kerikeri Irrigation Co Ltd.

== Uses ==
An easement exists with the Far North District Council which allows public access for passive activities such as sailing, picnicking, swimming, kayaking, and fishing.

The lake is stocked annually by Fish and Game with 400-500 rainbow trout fingerlings.

Motorised craft are restricted on Lake Manuwai, though exceptions are made for safety, scientific, and maintenance use.

== See also ==
- List of lakes in New Zealand
