= List of shipwrecks in 1851 =

The list of shipwrecks in 1851 includes ships sunk, foundered, wrecked, grounded, or otherwise lost during 1851.

table of contents
← 1850 / 1851 / 1852 →
Jan	Feb	Mar	Apr
May	Jun	Jul	Aug
Sep	Oct	Nov	Dec
Unknown date

== Unknown date ==
List of shipwrecks: Unknown date 1851
Ship	State	Description
Ajax	France	The whaler was lost in the Bering Strait. Her crew survived.
Albert	(United Kingdom of Great Britain and Ireland) Gambia Colony and Protectorate	The paddle steamer sank in the Gambia River before 8 March.
Alceste	(United Kingdom of Great Britain and Ireland) British North America.	The ship was lost in the Pacific Ocean. She was on a voyage from England to San Francisco, California, United States.
Arienis	United Kingdom	The East Indiaman was wrecked in the "Eugans Islands" with the loss of 20 of her 44 crew. She was on a voyage from London to Bombay, India and China.
Belle	(United Kingdom of Great Britain and Ireland) British North America	The ship was wrecked at Saint Kitts with the loss of her captain. She was on a voyage from Antigua to Saint Martin.
Belvidere	United States	The ship was wrecked on Santa María Island, Chile. All on board were rescued. She was on a voyage from San Francisco to Lima, Peru.
Bloater	(United Kingdom of Great Britain and Ireland) British North America	The ship was lost before 10 May.
Brutus	United Kingdom	The brig was wrecked in the "Bay of Quentino" with the loss of all but two of her crew.
Canton	United Kingdom	The paddle steamer ran aground in the Pearl River at Cumsingmoon, China. She was refloated and taken in to Whampoa for repairs.
Conway Castle	United Kingdom	The ship was wrecked on a reef off Sumatra, Netherlands East Indies.
Emblem	United Kingdom	The brig was abandoned in the Atlantic Ocean before 16 April.
Emmy	Hamburg	The ship was driven ashore at Tampico, Mexico between 27 June and 2 July. She was consequently condemned.
Eudora	(United Kingdom of Great Britain and Ireland) New Zealand	The barque was driven on shore on the Gisborne coast during July or August. All hands were saved.
Fawn	United Kingdom	The ship's crew mutinied, murdered her officers and scuttled her off Singapore.
Helene Frederika Govering	Sweden	The ship capsized in the Baltic Sea between 16 August and 14 October with the loss of all hands. She was on a voyage from Haparanda to Quebec City, Province of Canada, British North America.
Hotspur	United Kingdom	The ship was wrecked on Great Inagua. Her crew were rescued. She was on a voyage from Saint Domingo to an English port.
Jane Shields	United Kingdom	The barque was wrecked on a reef south of Talcahuano, Chile before 1 December.
Jeune Marie	France	The ship was lost at Carmen. Her crew were rescued.
Jubilee	United States	The fishing schooner was run down in Bay of St. Lawrence by schooner Summit. Crew saved.
Kirkwood	United States	The ship was lost whilst on a voyage from Rio de Janeiro, Brazil to New York.
Lucy Ann	(United Kingdom of Great Britain and Ireland) New South Wales	The cutter was destroyed at Murray Island. Her crew were murdered by the local inhabitants.
Marie Felicité	France	The schooner was wrecked at Grand-Bassam, Ivory Coast. She was on a voyage from Grand-Bassam to Havre de Grâce, Seine-Inférieure.
Mary	(United Kingdom of Great Britain and Ireland) Bermuda	The whaler, a barque, was wrecked on Lachlan Island. Her crew were murdered by the local inhabitants.
Metropolis	United Kingdom	The barque was wrecked on "Bintang". The wreck was later towed to Singapore by the steamship Hooghly ( India) and sold.
Mexican	United States	The 226-ton whaling ship was lost in the Arctic.
Montalembert	France	The ship was wrecked on "Panani Island", Spanish East Indies between 5 June and 9 December. Her crew were rescued. She was on a voyage from San Francisco to Manila, Spanish East Indies and Calcutta, India]
Narval	France	The whaler was wrecked on the coast of Korea. Her crew were rescued. She was on a voyage from Havre de Grâce to the South Seas.
Pekin	United Kingdom	The ship was driven ashore in the Columbia River at Fort Vancouver, Washington Territory and was abandoned by her crew.
Pioneer	United Kingdom	The brig was wrecked on the coast of New Zealand. She was on a voyage from Greenock, Renfrewshire to Australia and New Zealand.
Roseland	United Kingdom	The ship was destroyed by fire in the Indian Ocean. Her crew were rescued. She was on a voyage from Aden to London.
Solomon Saltus	(United Kingdom of Great Britain and Ireland) New South Wales	The barque was lost in the Bering Strait.
Sons of Commerce	United Kingdom	The ship was wrecked near Aden. Her crew survived, but were murdered by the local inhabitants.
Treasurer	United Kingdom	The ship was wrecked on the south coast of Cuba.
Ulrica	Sweden	The ship was severely damaged by fire at Charleston, South Carolina, United States.
Washington	United States	The ship was lost at Pitt's Island (now Kruzof Island) in the Alexander Archipelago in Russian Alaska.
