= Wainui River =

Wainui River is the name of four rivers in New Zealand:

- Wainui River (Bay of Plenty)
- Wainui River (Hawke's Bay)
- Wainui River (Northland)
- Wainui River (Tasman)
