= George Holdship =

New Zealand timber merchant

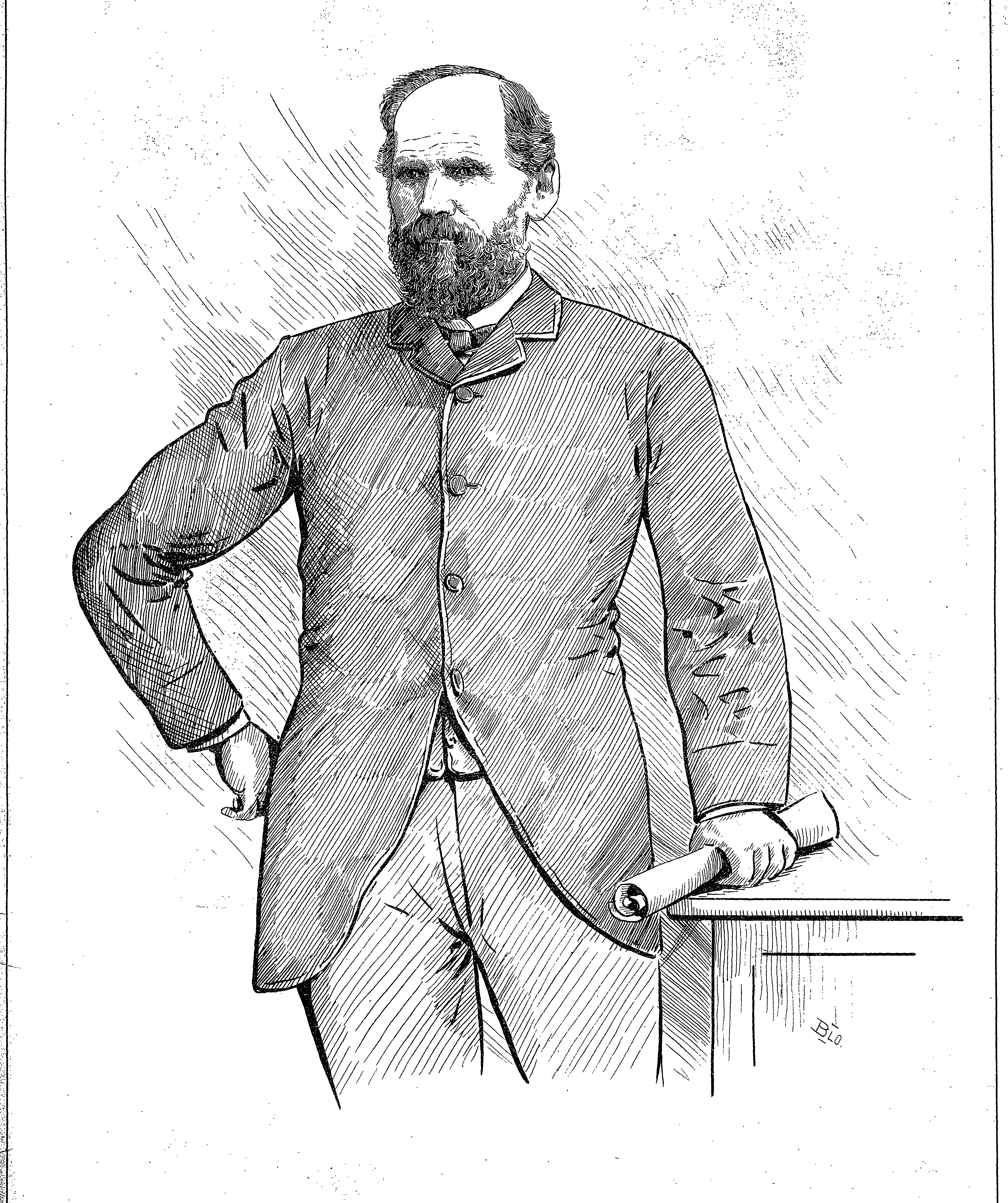
- George Holdship in 1888
- Born: 1839; Probably Belfast
- Died: 10 May 1923 (aged 83–84); Sydney
- Occupations: Carpenter, sawmiller
- Known for: Kauri Timber Company, member of Auckland City Council and Auckland Harbour Board
- Spouse: Sarah Lambourne
- Children: 8

George Holdship (1839–1923) emigrated to Auckland in 1855 and became a businessman, mainly involved in timber logging and sawmills. His companies (Auckland Timber Company and, from 1888, Kauri Timber Company) removed much of North Island’s native forest, initially kauri and later kahikatea. He moved to Sydney in 1913.

== Early life ==
George Holdship was born in, or near, Belfast in 1839. When he was 17 (or more likely 16) he emigrated on the Josephine Willis, which left Plymouth on 23 October 1854 and arrived at Auckland on 5 February 1855.

A jury list in 1856 showed Henry Holdship of Wakefield St as a grocer. In 1858 it showed Henry Holdship of Chapel St as a draper and George Holdship, also of Chapel St as a carpenter. George trained as a carpenter before forming his own timber firm about 1865, which included a sash and door factory in Newton.

During the invasion of the Waikato in 1864, George Holdship gained exemption from service by paying £10, as member of Auckland Militia, to provide substitutes, though his obituary said he was a member of the volunteer forces.

In the 1860s he was superintendent of the Primitive Methodist School – Auckland Sunday School Union, but he took his apprentices to the Police Court for absconding, for taking Boxing Day off and for not working after 5pm. and a court ruled that his steam engine and furnace were a nuisance to his neighbours. Next year he sold his Karangahape Rd house.

In 1867 George was president of the Newton Literary Association, in 1869 he chaired a meeting to form Newton Fire Brigade, was elected to the Karangahape Highway Board and he was on Auckland City Council from 1871 to 1876, and from 1885 to 1886, when he resigned and the family took a long break in England. In 1874 his fellow councillors were Daldy, with whom he developed Western Springs, Prime, Buchanan, Henry Brett and Macready. George arrived back in Auckland from San Francisco in 1887. They were in England in 1891, when Sarah was too ill to return. In 1883 George was a director of the New Zealand Iron & Steel Co.

== Family ==
Sarah Holdship (1841–1923) On 21 October 1862 George married Sarah Lambourne, who was born in 1841 in Hertfordshire. They had 5 sons. They lived for several years in London after leaving New Zealand. Sarah died at Belsize, Kent-road, Rose Bay, aged 82, and was buried at South Head Cemetery. She was survived by George, 2 sons, a daughter and G. B. Holdship (grandson).

Thomas Henry Holdship (1864–1910) was the eldest of George's sons. educated at Auckland Western Academy in 1872 and 1875. On 3 May 1888 he married Harriet Copland King at St John's, Ashfield. She died on 11 February 1889, aged 28. He remarried on 25 November 1890 at Darling Point to Mary Ethel Gore. He was KTC manager in 1889. He was made a JP at Pyrmont in 1890. A daughter was born in 1891. Thomas came close to bankruptcy in 1895. He and his wife arrived in London from Sydney by the Himalaya in 1896 suffering from insomnia and hoping to find a cure in England. Thomas and John Geoffrey Smith were trading as Holdship and Co, timber merchants, of Balmain in 1905. Thomas died on June 2, 1910. at Sutton Forest, aged 46.

George Watson Holdship (1866–1914) was born on March 11, 1866 The family moved to Sydney when he was about 16, though he completed his studies in England and in Europe. He worked at the Bank of New South Wales, then managed the Union Oil Engine Company, then became an Inspector with the New Zealand Insurance Co (accident department). He worked with A. E. D'Arcy, manager of the New Zealand (Accident) Insurance Co. at Sydney, specialising in miners' accidents, especially at Newcastle. In 1911 he went to Leura. when he bought Craig and Hogben estate agency. As a young man he played cricket with the Zingari Club. He played with various golf clubs, winning the Cadogan Cup one year. He was a founder of Rose Bay Club and was active in forming the Leura Club, being secretary for a while. George died on 5 September 1914, aged 48. at home at Gaheemay, Leura. He was said to be a popular personality in business and golf circles in Sydney. He left a wife, Hilda Aimee Blomfield, of Sydney, whom he'd married at Darlinghurst on 28 June 1899 and their children, George Watson and Hylda Isla. He'd been in poor health for a year, so that his death was not unexpected, though the day before he'd played golf, remarked on feeling better, welcomed the return of summer and hoped to improve. Heart-failure was shown on the death certificate. He was buried at Wentworth Falls cemetery.

Alfred Richardson Holdship (1867–1923) was at Auckland Western Academy in 1875, then went on to Caius College, the Inner Temple and was called to the bar in 1892. He also passed an examination of barristers at the University of New Zealand in 1896. In 1893 he moved to Wellington. He captained a New Zealand cricket team in Australia. was an old Auckland Grammar School boy. After leaving school he was a prominent member of the Gordon Cricket Club, of which his father was president. Subsequently he removed to Wellington, and while domiciled there he captained the first New Zealand cricket team to visit Australia. He sang at the Opera House in 1893. He was married in 1897 to Maud E. Clayton and they then travelled from Wellington to Sydney. In 1909 he was working as a patent agent in Christchurch. He left Christchurch for Sydney about 1914. In 1919 he went into partnership with his brother, Arthur, as a solicitor. The funeral of the late Mr. A. R. Holdship took place at the South Head cemetery on Monday afternoon. Among those present at the graveside were Ross Gore (Australian Golf Club), Plumpton, Wilson, Stevenson, Gurney (Victor Motor Co.), and F. King, Milford, C. Pain (University Club). He was a regular member of the second eleven of the Surrey County team, and on several occasions represented the county itself.

William Ernest Johnston Holdship, (1868–1936) a son in charge of the Lithgow Supply Co. since its inception. He left Lithgow to live in Sydney about 1929. In his early days he belonged to Lithgow cricket team. He was of a retiring disposition. He was a trustee of Lithgow hospital from about 1902 to 1925. On Wednesday, October 5, 1898 at 5 Featherston Terrace, Wellington, William married Emily Felicia Dean, youngest daughter of Rev W. T, Dean. He died on 14 March 1936, aged 68, leaving Emily as a widow.

Edith Adeline Holdship (1869) died at 3 months old on 20 August 1869.

Ida Evelyn Holdship (−1943) became a deaconess in 1917 and was associated with the Deaconess' Institution, Newtown, for a number of years. Her father left her an annuity of £100. She married in 1935 to Leon L de Groen. She died on 5 February 1943, at home at 20 Streatfield Road, Bellevue Hill.

Arthur Herbert Holdship (1874–1926) solicitor, and senior partner of the firm of Messrs. Holdship, Barnes, and Co., died suddenly on 7 April 1926 at his home at Spencer-road, Cremorne, aged 52. He was born in Auckland and educated at Cheltenham College, and later at Oxford. Coming to Australia, he was articled to the firm of Messrs. Stephen, Jaques, and Stephen. Mr. Holdship was admitted as a solicitor of the Supreme Court in 1898, and later went into partnership with the late Mr. a'Beckett. In 1919 he went into partnership with his brother, Alfred, as a solicitor. He married Enid Blanche Mountford on 21 April 1908. He was survived by his wife and a daughter, Patricia Holdship and buried at South Head Cemetery. In George's will probate was granted to Arthur, William and Clarence Arthur Gurney, Holdship, Barnes, & Co, 160 Phillip-street, Sydney.

== George Holdship and Company ==
By 1866 George was listed as a timber merchant and was advertising for sawyers at his Custom-house St factory. A fire in 1866 burnt several houses on East St, including one next door to Holdship's house, which was saved by the assistance of the bystanders.

In 1870 he linked his mills across Custom House St with a tramway. In 1871 the brick chimney at the Newton mill was blown down in a gale.

== Auckland Timber Company ==
Towards the end of Vogel's economic boom, George arranged for George Holdship and Company to be taken over by the Auckland Timber Company Limited (ATC) in January 1878, with George remaining managing director. Initially it had a capital of £120,000 and the shareholder directors were -

- Robert Bleazard (c1818-1886) – father of artist Eden Bleazard and a Mount Eden farmer, bucket manufacturer and goldfields investor.
- William Crush Daldy (1816–1903)
- William Errington (1832-1894) – an engineer from South Shields, who designed the Western Springs water pump and Calliope Dock.
- Alexander Richardson Watson (1828–1911) – a contractor from Peebles, who came to Auckland in the 1860s and built many local buildings, probably including the ATC head office. He was thought to be one of the richest people in Auckland.

12,000 £5 shares were issued in 1878. ATC took over the Newton mill in Custom House St, where there was a boiler fire in 1878. Smoke and sparks from the Auckland mills remained an issue until the Custom House chimney was raised in 1878.

=== Move from Newton to Freemans Bay ===
During the early colonial period, the site adjoined an area of settlement that spread along the waterfront between the town’s main commercial centre in Queen Street and an industrial suburb at Waiatarau, renamed Freemans Bay. The latter was a centre for timber production from an early stage in colonial development, with sawyers described as present by 1841. The reclamation works were commissioned by Auckland Harbour Board (AHB), which was formed in 1871, under the Auckland Harbour Act 1874. When reclamation was commissioned, George was an AHB member and suggestions were made that the company wasn't charged full rent. A contract for the Hardinge Street project was awarded to Martin Danaher in October 1875. The project involved cutting back the cliff, erecting a stone retaining wall and infilling the seabed. The retaining wall was at least 200 feet long and formed part of the southern boundary of the current site. The works appear to have been still in progress towards the end of 1876. Following completion, the reclaimed area accommodated an extension of Customhouse Street, later renamed Customs Street West, then Fanshawe Street. Major occupants either side of Fanshawe Street included some of Auckland’s largest timber firms, notably the New Zealand Timber Company (NZTC) and ATC.

The Newton works was moved to the new, larger site, with its large wharf, tramways and modern sawmill machinery. George Holdship designed the new factory, which was built by W. Priestley from 1878 to 1880.

By 1881 ATC was able to pay a 10% dividend.

Many accidents were reported at the mills, so that the staff set up a benefit society to alleviate hardship.

George Holdship was described in 1888 as having keen business ability, a straightforward, outspoken style and social qualities, when ATC amalgamated with other timber companies under the Kauri Syndicate, of which George was managing director. ATC was noted for its modern machinery and large scale production. In more recent times its assets were owned by Fletcher Challenge.

Up to around 1884, the Kauri timber industry was doing really well, mainly due to the building boom experienced as part of the rapid expansion of building, fuelled by the gold rush of the late 1870’s and the increase in population as settlers flooded into the country – they desperately needed housing, along with the services from retail and commerce.

Many sawmillers were caught out by the depression from 1879 until sawn timber built up in their yards. By 1878, the profitable local market no longer existed and sailing ships were giving way to steam, so the lucrative export of spars also fell, with many fearing that a total collapse of the industry was nigh. Some sawmilling firms who had brought large blocks of standing Kauri found themselves with enormous debts and interest payments, which were expected to be met by the sale of sawn timber. Large quantities of Kauri were sold at uneconomically low prices to a severely depressed market, which only aggravated the situation. The directors of the KTC believed, however, that it was more likely that the frightfully depressed timber trade was symptoms of a wider malaise, including a very unpopular company tax, as well as competition in its major export market across the Tasman. It caused widespread problems, manifesting in the severe economic depression of 1887–1892, which saw a cut in timber workers’ wages to nearly half that of the early 1880’s.

In 1886 ATC was exporting houses to the Kimberley goldfields.

== Constituent companies and assets in 1888 ==
When KTC was formed in 1888, it took over 28 sawmills, from Coromandel northwards, and many other assets –

- Auckland Timber Company – George Holdship had started milling about 1865, formed ATC in 1878, was the main instigator of KTC and was KTC's first New Zealand director. ATC had steamers (Terror, Yankee Doodle and Hokianga), schooners (Mariner, Kauri and Bate) and –
  - Sydney – 5 acres (2.0 ha) fronting Sydney Harbour.
  - Auckland head office, mills at Newton and Freemans Bay.
  - Port Charles In 1865, Robert Cashmore purchased the timber on the Tangiaronui block and began erecting a sawmill when a dispute arose with the Māori owners and operations were suspended. Charles J.W. Kensington appears to have taken the mill over but went bankrupt in December 1866. Kensington continued to live in the district and died there in 1877. By 1875 Pollard & Co are shown as owners, then G. Holdship was agent in 1874. KTC closed the mill in 1889 and machinery was removed in 1890. The machinery consisted of a vertical breaking down bench and circular saw breast bench driven by a 20 hp steam engine. They cut 50000 feet per week, employing 50 men. The mill site and adjoining lands were offered for sale by tender in May 1902. Daily Southern Cross: 10 & 28 August 1865, Daily Southern Cross 13, 15 and 17 December 1866, A.J.H.R. 1875 C-3, Bretts Auckland Almanac 1879 p127 By 1868 a sawmill had been opened, which later belonged to the Auckland Timber Co and had a tramway.
  - Whangaroa / Mangonui (or Mongonui) – opened from 1880, after 2,600 acres (1,100 ha) was sold to ATC for £1,250 in 1878. A wharf was authorised in 1881 and Oruaiti River was used for booms from 1884.
  - Kennedy’s Bay mill was built to the north of the bay by Alexander McGregor, Frederick Atkinson and Charles Broadbent, trading as Alexander McGregor Company in 1862. Charles Broadbent left the partnership on 22 February 1863. In 1864 Cruickshank, Smart & Co managed the mill which cut about 2 million feet annually. It closed in 1891.
- New Zealand Timber Company — mills at Auckland, Whangapoua (2), and Freemans Bay, cutters "Fanny." "Nellie," "Gipsy", barges "Progress" and ''Waitemata", 3 mi (4.8 km) of tramway, 3 locomotives. Hokianga mill, of about 1882, at Koutu Point, on the east bank, about 5 mi (8.0 km) up the Hokianga River, milled kauri and some totara. Cutting-capacity, 9,000,000 superficial feet; output, 3,200,000 superficial feet; mill hands, 30. At Freeman's Bay, in 1867, Frank Jagger and Mr. Parker became coal and firewood merchants. That business was bought by NZTC, but Frank was manager until KTC was formed.
- Union Steam Saw, Moulding, Sash and Door Company Limited mills at Mechanics Bay, Aratapu, and Tairua. Union had started in 1865 and its Aratapu mill was built in 1885, with shipping berths.
- Kopuru Saw Mill Company mill, tramway and over 4,000 acres (1,600 ha) freehold and 40,000 acres (16,000 ha) leasehold kauri bush at Te Kopuru, bought by John Logan Campbell about 1878.
- David Blair & Son, of Hikutaia, Thames River, and Market Street, Melbourne, with barques " Grassmere" and " Killarney". Kirikiri mill, built by John Gibbons in 1869, was beside Kirikiri Stream. Here there was a wharf a quarter of a mile long into deep water for shipment of sawn timber. Logs, mostly white pine, were floated down the Waihou to mill booms. There were several owners and lessees. J.S. McFarlane owned it in the late 1870s after being idle for two years. It was sold to Mr E. Carr in 1879, Gibbons being the mill manager. Carr & Co erected a new mill at Te Aroha in 1882. John Read in 1883 was cutting two million feet a year. He was bringing kahikatea from the banks of the Waihou River and kauri logs from Koputauaki near Coromandel. By June 1887, it was in the hands of Blair and Gillespie who sold to KTC in June 1888. Thomas Gibbons was Manager. KTC leased to James Darrow for 5 years, and Mortonsen for a short while. A report in 1899 said that Kirikiri mill was built of kahikatea and that it was 'rotton and a perfect wreck'. James McAndrew purchased the mill in July 1899 and re-erected it at the Junction at Paeroa. He commenced cutting November 15, 1899. The mill site on the Hurumoimoi Block was sold by auction May 8, 1890 to Mr John Hudson, KTC branch manager.
- Grahamstown mill was built by George Holdship in 1868 at the beach-end of Cochrane where there was a wharf. They purchased the timber on the Otuturu Block north of Thames, near Tapu in 1870. Adjacent to the sawmill was a planing mill and sash and door factory. ATC took over. Not been able to ascertain when the mill closed.
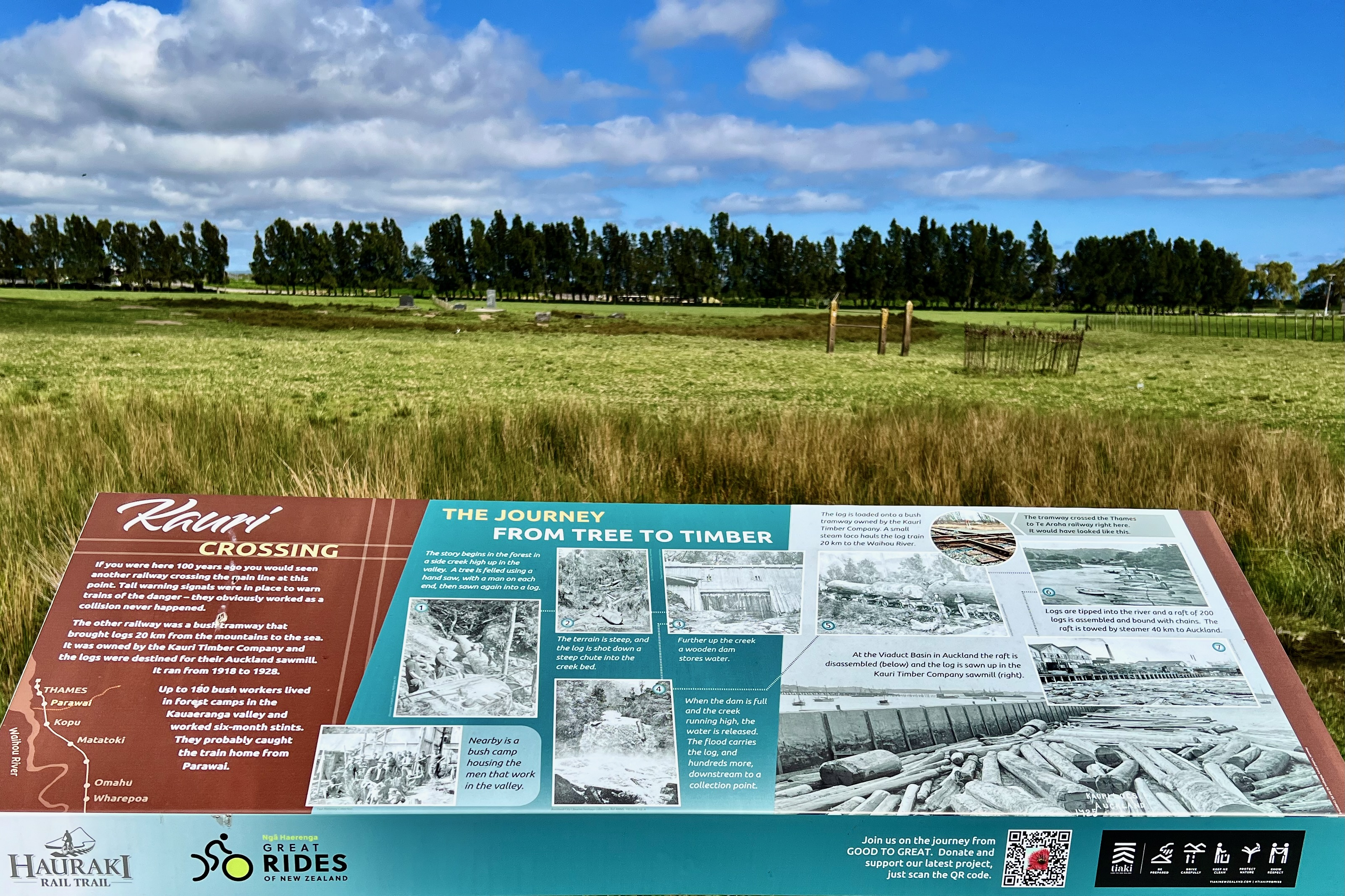
- Kauraeranga Valley information board near Totara on Hauraki Rail Trail
  Shortland mills at Auckland and Shortland and 29,000 acres of Leasehold Lands. In 1869 Russel, Stone and Wilson bought cutting rights in the Waiwhakaurunga blocks from the Māori owners. The timber grant, over 12,000 acres, was to expire 22 August 1971. The Crown later acquired the freehold but not the timber. C.J. Stone built a large mill with a shipyard at Shortland, corner of Grey and Pollen streets in 1871. He had bought out Russel and Wilson and traded as the Shortland Sawmill Co. Logs were driven from dams up the Kauaeranga to booms at Parawai and floated up the Hape Stream to the mill. Sawn timber was sent by punt up river to Kopu for loading into sailing vessels for export. Production was 12,000 board-feet per day, employing 25 mill hands. C.J. Stone died in April 1885. KTC sold the mill to Auckland Rimu Timber Co Ltd to move to Ngongotahā in 1912. The last big removal of timber from the Kauraeranga Valley started with KTC building a 14 mi (23 km) tramway up the valley from the Parawai booms in 1915. Later they extended the line to a dump at the Waihou river below Kopu. All bush operations were finished by January 1928, and the line was lifted. Over 40 million feet was carried over this line.
- Messrs. Jagger and Parker. Mills at Wharanaki, Omana and Oriwa, and Forests at Motarau and Kaukapakapa. A Tramway is laid from the Bush to the Wharanaki Mill.
- Helensville Timber Company Limited mill on the bank of the Kaipara River and retail yards at Mount Eden Railway Station, and Christchurch, for £5, paid up—£4 10s per share.

=== 104 Fanshawe Street, head office ===
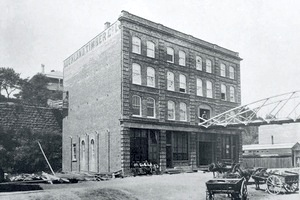
Auckland Timber Co building at 104 Fanshawe Street in 1880s

Constructed from 1881 to 1882, the 4-storey brick building at 104 Fanshawe Street, was ATC's head office, showroom, store and factory of the ATC (1881–8), the KTC (1888–1944). It is now a boutique clothing store, bar and offices, with a Historic Place Category 1, List Number 9583. The head office was described by the American consul in 1883 as ‘splendid buildings, surpassing anything of the kind in the Southern Hemisphere’. The building’s architect is unknown, though architect Henry Wade (1835–1900) had worked as a manager for Holdship, having arrived in New Zealand in 1863, and continued to be involved in Holdship’s business affairs including as a significant shareholder of ATC. Part of the site was owned by one of the initial shareholders, William Crush Daldy. W. C. Daldy junior was secretary of ATC. The design and use of the building reflected Holdship’s promotion of mechanisation, and the closer integration of activities linked with the manufacture of timber products. Steam was used to power a lift to move goods between floors. It also drove a putty mill and other machinery. By 1884, the works were described as ‘one of the most extensive industries of the kind in the colony’.

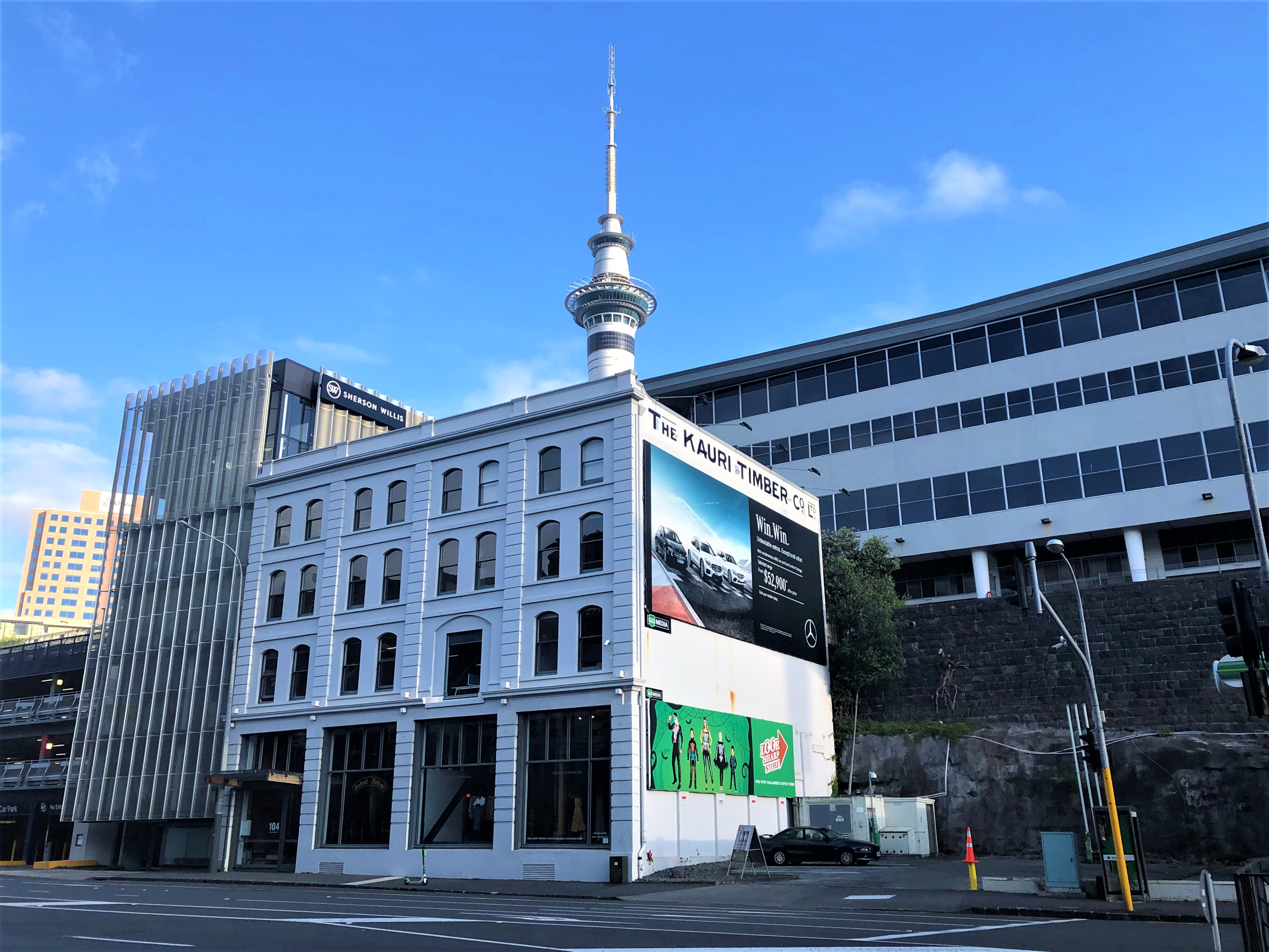
Kauri Timber Co building in 2019

== Retirement to Sydney ==
George Holdship, a Sydney timber merchant, owned 9 Adderstone Avenue, North Sydney, built in 1884 in the Victorian Italianate style, from 1913 to 1923 and changed its name to 'Craigielea'. They returned from a long break in Europe in 1894. George made trips to Auckland in 1891 and 1896.

In 1892 he moved from Buckland Crescent to a more commodious house on the Belsize Park Estate. It would seem that he has abandoned the colony altogether, since he has taken a seven years lease of the new domicile. Mrs Holdship remains in poor health, and is recruiting amid the pine woods of Bournemouth. George and Sarah visited New Zealand in 1907.

== Death ==
George Holdship died on 10 May 1923, aged 84. He survived his wife by only a fortnight, Mrs. Holdship having died in Sydney on 27 April 1923 at the age of 82. There were 2 surviving sons and a daughter. Mourners at his funeral included his sons, W. E. J. Holdship and A. H. Holdship, and G. B. Holdship, his grandson and Miss Pallister represented the Deaconess Institution. He was buried at South Head Cemetery. His estate was valued at £63,266.
