= List of shipwrecks in 1849 =

The list of shipwrecks in 1849 includes ships sunk, wrecked or otherwise lost during 1849.

table of contents
← 1848 / 1849 / 1850 →
Jan	Feb	Mar	Apr
May	Jun	Jul	Aug
Sep	Oct	Nov	Dec
Unknown date

== Unknown date ==
List of shipwrecks: Unknown date in 1849
Ship	State	Description
Algoma	United States	The steamboat sank in the Missouri River below Lexington, Missouri.
Apollo	United States	The full-rigged ship capsized off Cape Horn with the loss of all hands.
Delfshaven	Netherlands	The ship was wrecked near "Pulo Dupur", Netherlands East Indies. Her crew were rescued. She was on a voyage from Batavia, Netherlands East Indies to a Dutch port.
Finette	France	The ship was destroyed by fire in the Atlantic Ocean. Her crew survived. She was on a voyage from Cette, Hérault to the River Plate.
Hebe	United Kingdom	The brig was wrecked in the Strait of Magellan. All on board were rescued by Unicorn (United Kingdom).
Herald	United Kingdom	The ship was wrecked in Narva Bay between 6 May and 29 November. she was on a voyage from Liverpool, Lancashire to Narva, Russia.
Isabella Anna	(United Kingdom of Great Britain and Ireland) New South Wales	The ship was wrecked on the Isle of Pines, New Caledonia before 20 August.
John Youlston	United States	The ship was wrecked in the Falkland Islands. Her crew were rescued.
La Fauvette	Unknown	The barque was lost in the vicinity of "Squan Beach," a term used at the time for the coast of New Jersey near Manasquan and sometimes for the 7-mile (11 km) stretch of coast between Manasquan Inlet and Cranberry Inlet or for the entire coast of New Jersey between Sea Girt and Barnegat Inlet.
Mary Whitney, or Sarah Whitney	United Kingdom	The ship was wrecked in the Yangtze Kiang. All on board were rescued by HMS Medea (Royal Navy).
Persian	United Kingdom	The ship was wrecked in the Yangtze Kiang. All on board were rescued by HMS Medea (Royal Navy).
Royal Archer	United Kingdom	The ship collided with Benares (United Kingdom) and foundered in the Atlantic Ocean. She was on a voyage from London to Adelaide, South Australia.
Sarah Crisp	United Kingdom	The full-rigged ship sprang a leak and capsized in the South China Sea with the subsequent loss of thirteen of her 32 crew. Survivors were rescued by Emma Sherratt (United Kingdom) after spending 27 days on the wreck.
Sylph	United Kingdom	The ship was lost with all hands whilst on a voyage from Hong Kong to Singapore.
Ursia	United Kingdom	The ship was lost near Santo Domingo, Dominican Republic.
Watt	United Kingdom	The tug was driven ashore on the Isle of Man. She was refloated on 26 February having been ashore "for some time".
