= Oruaiti River =

Coordinates: 35°01′S 173°33′E

Location
- Country: New Zealand

Physical characteristics
- Source
  - elevation: 374 m (1,227 ft)
- Mouth
  - location: Doubtless Bay
  - elevation: 0m
- Length: 25 km (16 mi)

The Oruaiti River is a river of the northern Northland Region of New Zealand's North Island. It is fed by Wainui River and flows generally north, draining into Mangonui Harbour at the southern end of Doubtless Bay. It is within the rohe of Ngāti Kahu ki Whangaroa.

The river drains the northern edge of Omahuta Forest, runs in a gorge through the Otangaroa massif, then meanders into the Oruaiti estuary, where it is joined by the Kenana River. The catchment is mainly farmland, pine forest and native bush.

Pollution in the river is classed as fair to good.

In 1862 the lower reaches of the river were described as fern country. The native forest was logged after 2,600 acres (1,100 ha) was sold to Auckland Timber Co for £1,250 in 1878. A wharf was authorised at Mangonui in 1881 and the estuary was used for booms from 1884.

== See also ==
- List of rivers of New Zealand
