= List of shipwrecks in 1852 =

The list of shipwrecks in 1852 includes ships sunk, foundered, wrecked, grounded, or otherwise lost during 1852.

table of contents
← 1851 / 1852 / 1853 →
Jan	Feb	Mar	Apr
May	Jun	Jul	Aug
Sep	Oct	Nov	Dec
Unknown date

== Unknown date ==
List of shipwrecks: Unknown date in 1852
Ship	State	Description
Agenoria	(United Kingdom of Great Britain and Ireland) Van Diemen's Land	The schooner ran aground and was wrecked at Port Albert, New South Wales.
Alkality	Belgium	The ship was abandoned and sank off Muscat, Muscat and Oman. Her crew were rescued by Framjee Cowajee ( India). Alkality was on a voyage from Mauritius to Muscat.
Amidas	United Kingdom	The ship was destroyed by fire in the Atlantic Ocean (38°30′S 54°20′W). Her twenty crew were rescued by Amelia (United Kingdom). Amidas was on a voyage from Liverpool, Lancashire to Coquimbo, Chile.
Berenice	United Kingdom	The ship was destroyed by fire off Java, Netherlands East Indies between 3 November and 10 December. She was on a voyage from China to Australia.
Dolphin	United Kingdom	The ship caught fire, exploded and sank in the "Camaroons River", Africa. Her crew were rescued.
Elizabeth	United Kingdom	The ship was wrecked in the Andaman Islands. She was on a voyage from Akyab, Burma to Queenstown, County Cork.
George Henry	United Kingdom	The barque was wrecked at Limehouse, British Honduras.
Golden Rule	United Kingdom	The schooner was wrecked on a reef whilst on a voyage from Tahiti to San Francisco, California.
Grenouille	France	The ship was pillaged and burnt off the coast of Madagascar. Eight of her crew were rescued, but one was taken prisoner by the King of Mirabe.
Hyderabad	United Kingdom	The ship ran aground on the Boca de Hulods Rocks. She was refloated and beached on the coast of Trinidad. She was on a voyage from Calcutta, India to a British port.
Ida	United Kingdom	The ship was abandoned in the South Atlantic. Her crew survived. She was on a voyage from Liverpool to San Francisco.
Jeune Laure	France	The ship was wrecked on the coast of Zanzibar. Her crew were rescued.
King	United Kingdom	The ship was wrecked on the coast of New Caledonia. She was on a voyage from Sydney, New South Wales to Manila, Spanish East Indies.
Lady Sale	United Kingdom	The ship ran aground on the Cockburne Reef, in the Torres Strait after 20 May. She was refloated on 4 June with assistance from Surinam (Netherlands) and taken in to Calcutta, India, where she arrived on 7 August.
Margaret	United Kingdom	The ship was wrecked at Limehouse, British Honduras.
Margarita	Chile	The brig was lost at Fort Colcura, Lota.
Minnie	United Kingdom	The schooner was wrecked at Cape George, Nova Scotia, British North America between 25 November and 29 December. She was on a voyage from Charlottetown, Prince Edward Island, British North America to New York, United States
Nerio	United Kingdom	The barque was wrecked in the Bird Islands before 4 June. Eighty people were rescued by Thames (United Kingdom).
Ohio	Bremen	The barque foundered in the San Bernardino Strait before 16 November. Her crew survived. She was on a voyage from Lima, Peru to Manila, Spanish East Indies.
Portuguese	(flag) Chile	The barque was lost at Fort Colcura.
Royal Packet	(United Kingdom of Great Britain and Ireland) New South Wales	The ship was wrecked on the Great Barrier Reef before 12 July. Six of her crew were rescued by George ( (United Kingdom of Great Britain and Ireland) South Australia), five other survivors took to a boat. Royal Packet was on a voyage from Sydney to Java, Netherlands East Indies.
Seamew	United States	The brig was wrecked in Yoff Bay, Cape Verde Islands.
SMS Seemöve	(Austrian Empire) Austrian Navy	The steamship was wrecked between Fiume and Pula. Her crew were rescued.
Ticonderoga	United States	The ship was wrecked off the coast of India
Tipperary	United Kingdom	The ship ran aground and was wrecked at the mouth of the Benin River, Africa.
Ulrica	United States	The ship was abandoned in the Gilolo Passage.
Vice Admiraal de Ryk	Netherlands	The ship was wrecked on Christmas Island before 27 September with the loss of all but three of her crew.
Wild Pigeon	United Kingdom	The ship ran aground in the South China Sea (1°12′S 166°42′E).
