= List of shipwrecks in 1854 =

The list of shipwrecks in 1854 includes ships sunk, foundered, wrecked, grounded, or otherwise lost during 1854.

table of contents
← 1853 / 1854 / 1855 →
Jan	Feb	Mar	Apr
May	Jun	Jul	Aug
Sep	Oct	Nov	Dec
Unknown date

== Unknown date ==
List of shipwrecks: Unknown date in 1854
Ship	State	Description
Abbe	United Kingdom	The ship was reported missing, presumed foundered with the loss on all on board.
Aigle	Austrian Empire	The yacht ran aground and was wrecked in the Danube near "Strudel". She was on a voyage from Linz to Vienna.
Agnes Hall	United Kingdom	The ship was reported missing, presumed foundered with the loss on all on board.
American Lass	(United Kingdom of Great Britain and Ireland) British North America	The ship was reported missing, presumed foundered with the loss on all on board. She was on a voyage from Saint John, New Brunswick to Porto, Portugal.
Ann	United Kingdom	The ship was reported missing, presumed foundered with the loss on all on board. She was on a voyage from Quebec City, Province of Canada, British North America to Bristol, Gloucestershire.
Ann Cropper	United Kingdom	The ship was wrecked at the Sand Heads, at the mouth of the Hooghly River.
Ann Tift	United Kingdom	The ship was reported missing, presumed foundered with the loss on all on board.
Antilles	United Kingdom	The ship was reported missing, presumed foundered with the loss on all on board.
Arco	United States	The ship was reported missing, presumed foundered with the loss on all on board.
Beddington	United Kingdom	Crimean War: The ship was sunk in the Danube by Russian artillery between 16 October 1853 and 27 March 1854. Her crew were taken prisoner.
Emma Field	United Kingdom	The ship was reported missing, presumed foundered with the loss on all on board. She was on a voyage from Bath, Maine, United States to Liverpool.
Flash	(United Kingdom of Great Britain and Ireland) Van Diemen's Land	The schooner was wrecked on the coast of Van Diemen's Land. Her crew were rescued.
Gipsy	United Kingdom	The ship was reported missing, presumed foundered with the loss on all on board. She was on a voyage from Saint John's, Newfoundland, British North America to Greenock, Renfrewshire.
Governor Briggs	United Kingdom	The ship was reported missing, presumed foundered with the loss on all on board.
Hamoody	India	The barque was wrecked in the Laccadive Islands.
Hosanna	India	The barque was wrecked in the Maldive Islands.
Joanna	United Kingdom	The ship was reported missing, presumed foundered with the loss of all on board. She was on a voyage from New York to Dunkerque, Nord, France.
John Wickliffe	United Kingdom	The ship was reported missing, presumed foundered with the loss on all on board.
Lancastrian	United Kingdom	The ship was lost near Foo Chow Foo, China.
Leviathan	United Kingdom	The ship was reported missing, presumed foundered with the loss on all on board. She was on a voyage from New York to Liverpool, Lancashire.
Maranon	United Kingdom	The ship was wrecked at the Sand Heads, at the mouth of the Hooghly River.
Nene Valley	United Kingdom	The ship was driven ashore at Cape Northumberland, South Australia. She was on a voyage from London to Portland Bay.
Odessa	United Kingdom	The ship was wrecked on Anticosti Island, Province of Canada. Her crew survived. She was on a voyage from Quebec City to Limerick.
Prince	United Kingdom	The ship was sunk by ice in the Atlantic Ocean.
Red Rover	United Kingdom	The ship was reported missing, presumed foundered with the loss on all on board.
Richard Watson	United Kingdom	The ship was reported missing, presumed foundered with the loss on all on board.
Sarah	United Kingdom	The ship was reported missing, presumed foundered with the loss on all on board.
Speculator	United Kingdom	The ship was reported missing, presumed foundered with the loss on all on board.
Syria	United Kingdom	The ship was reported missing, presumed foundered with the loss on all on board.
Union	Belgium	The brig was lost whilst on a voyage from Newcastle upon Tyne, Northumberland to Senegal.
Union	United Kingdom	The whaler was lost off Greenland. There were at least two survivors.
Urgent	United Kingdom	The ship was reported missing, presumed foundered with the loss on all on board.
Warner	United Kingdom	The ship was reported missing, presumed foundered with the loss on all on board She was on a voyage from New York to Dunkerque.
Waterloo	United Kingdom	The ship was reported missing, presumed foundered with the loss of all on board. She was on a voyage from Liverpool to New York.
Wilberforce	United Kingdom	The ship was reported missing, presumed foundered with the loss on all on board.
William	United Kingdom	The barque was driven ashore and wrecked at the Belle Tout Lighthouse, Sussex. Her crew survived.
William Thompson	United Kingdom	The ship was reported missing, presumed foundered with the loss on all on board.
Young Australian	(United Kingdom of Great Britain and Ireland) New South Wales	The paddle steamer was driven ashore at Cape Northumberland.
