= Kauri Timber Company =

New Zealand logging and sawmilling company

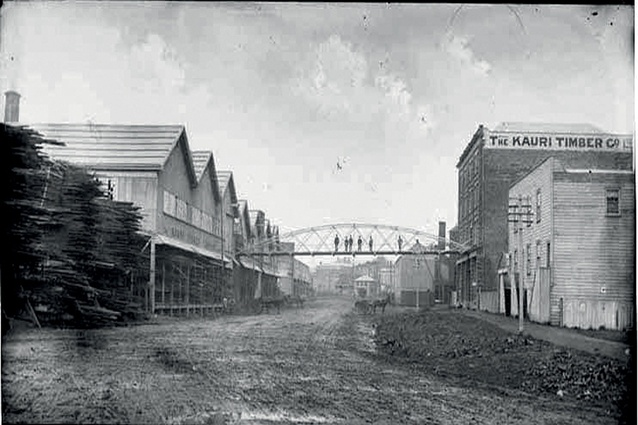
Auckland Timber Company Building (right), after its takeover by the Kauri Timber Company in 1888. A wire suspension bridge hosted rails to allow the transfer of goods from the factory to the mill on trollies.

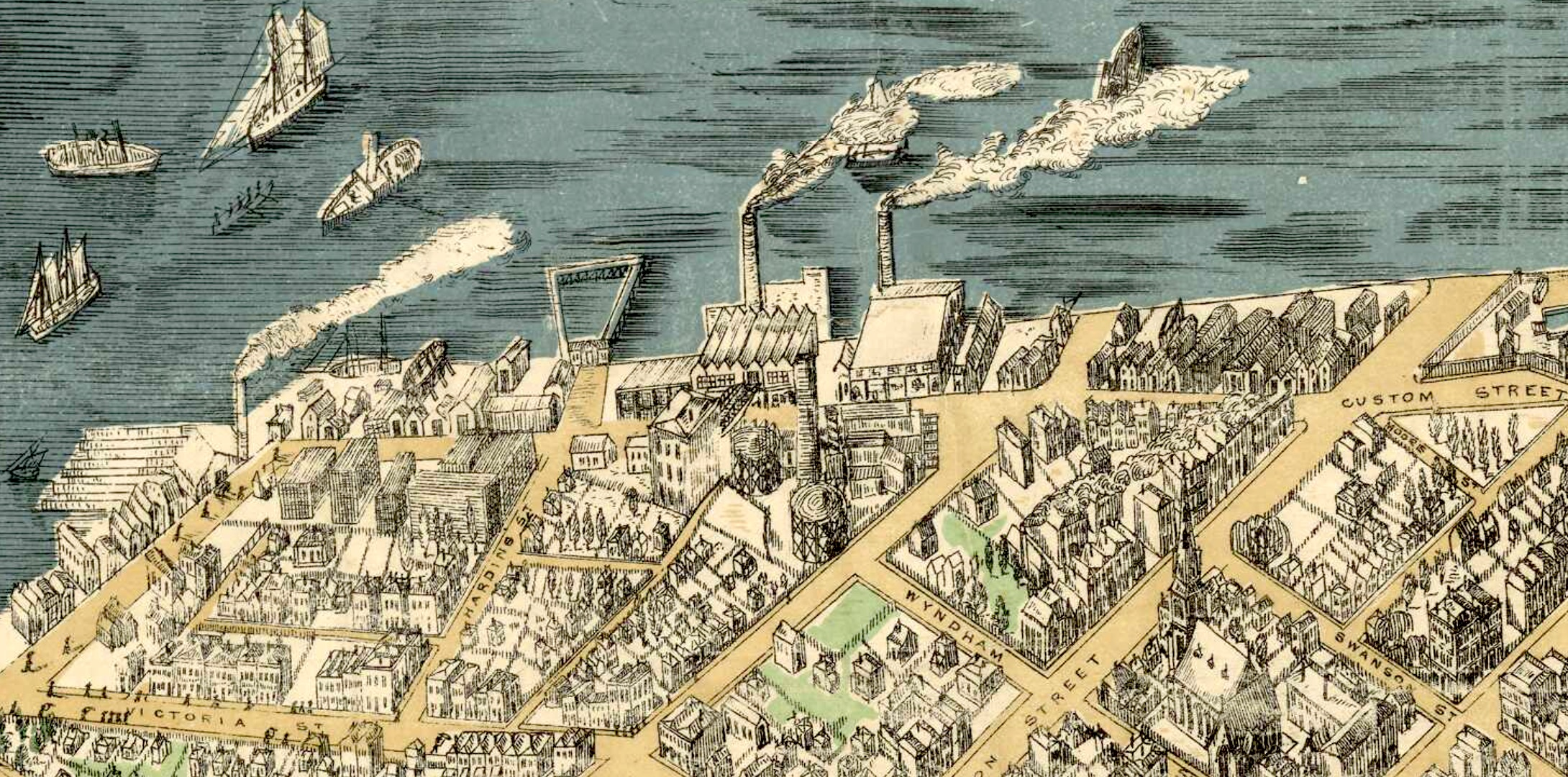
1886 birds-eye view of Kauri Timber Co

The Kauri Timber Company, Limited (KTC) Auckland was from 1888 to 1971 a large logging and sawmilling company in New Zealand.

== History ==
KTC was formed in 1888, with a capital of £1,250,000, paid up to £750,000, and its operations were of a very comprehensive nature. Besides KTC's headquarters in Melbourne and a branch in Sydney, there were sixteen branches in New Zealand, where the timber was milled, including Hokianga Sawmill Company. The forests owned by KTC made it the fifth-largest landholding company in the country, which removed much of North Island’s native forest, initially kauri and later kahikatea, assuring steady supplies for its mills for many years. Between 300 and 400 men were engaged in the Auckland mill and factory, and throughout the whole of the company's operations in mills, stores, and forests, some 5000 or 6000 people were employed. In its extensive export trade the company employed a large fleet of vessels, and was represented in the markets of Great Britain, Cape Colony, Australia and the South Sea Islands. The operations of the company expanded to Vanikoro in the Solomon Islands, where it merged in 1925 with San Cristoval Estates Ltd. to form the Vanikoro Kauri Timber Company.

The Auckland mill burnt down in 1942 and a new yard opened in Penrose in 1944. The 4-storey office at 104 Fanshawe St, which had been opened in 1882 by KTC's predecessor, Auckland Timber Co, and is now a Category 1 listed building, was sold to Austral Super Paint Ltd and a single storey office opened in the new yard.

KTC was hit by 'the Menzies bloody Credit Squeeze' mini-budget in 1961 and invited Fletcher Holdings to buy KTC's New Zealand assets. First the Christchurch plywood factory, Butler Bros, Stuart & Chapman and Ellis & Burnand were sold on 5 June 1961 for NZ£750,000 (A£930,000), though they were said to be worth well in excess of £1 million. KTC's other New Zealand assets were sold to Fletcher for £1.6 million later in the year. KTC's customers and senior staff were not happy with the takeover, causing profitability to drop. They were merged into Fletcher Challenge in 1981.

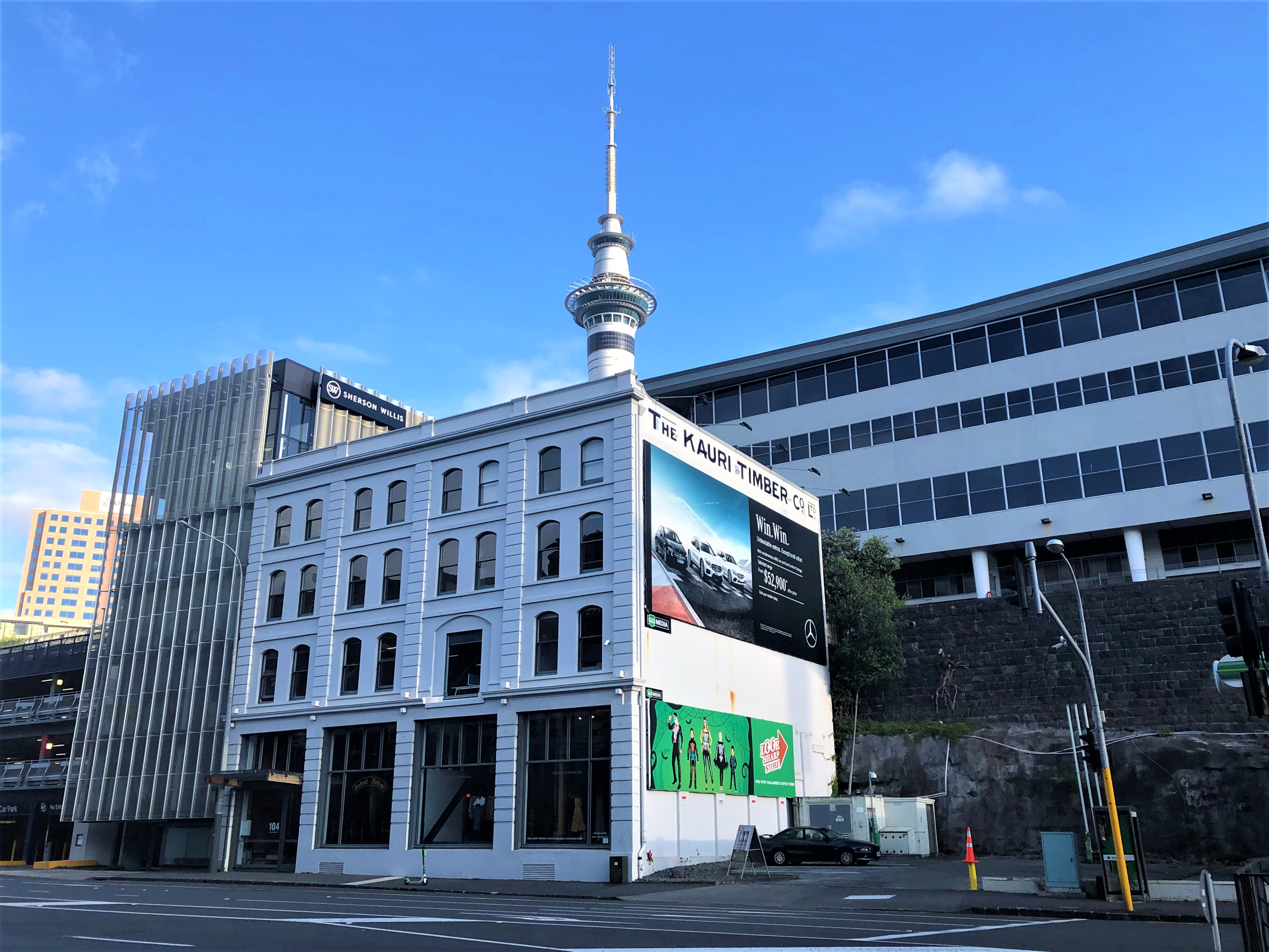
Kauri Timber Co building in 2019

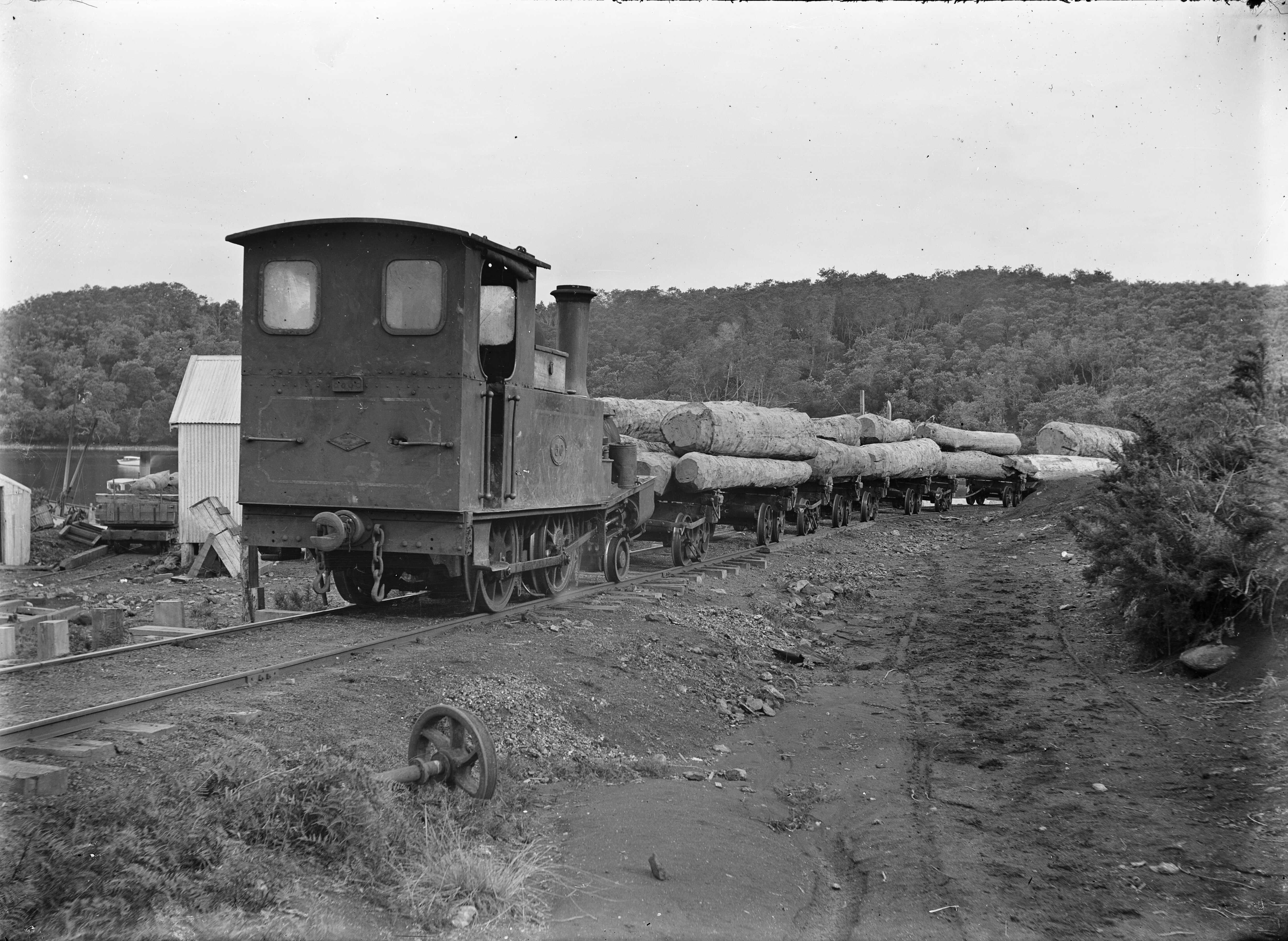
Kauri Timber Company's timber train at Waipapa, laden with logs, 1912

Kauri Timber Company was sold to East Asiatic Company in 1971. Chatlee mill at Smithton was upgraded, 'home centres' were opened in Adelaide and Melbourne and Devonport and Deloraine sawmills were sold to J. & T. Gunn. Kauri Holdings Ltd was listed on the Victoria Stock Exchange in 1987.

== Interests taken over in 1888 ==
- Auckland Timber Co. Ltd.
- New Zealand Timber Co. Ltd.
- Union Steam Saw, Moulding, Sash and Door Co. Ltd.
- Te Kopuru Saw Mill Co., Kaipara (John Logan Campbell).
- Mercury Bay Saw Mill Co.
- David Blair and Son, Hikutaia, Thames River.
- Shortland Saw Mill (Stone & White).
- Jagger & Parker, Whananaki (Kaipara).
- Shappe & Ansenne, Mercury Bay.
- Pearce Lanigan, Ngunguru.
- Onehunga Saw Mill (F.P. Clarke), Waitakarei.
- John Wigmore, Whangaroa.
- Helensville Timber Co. Ltd.
- Coulthard Bros., Papakura.
- Hokianga Saw Mill Co, Ltd.
- Whitelaw and Day, Hikurangi (Whangarei).
- Henry Brett, (Kaipara district).
- Port Fitzroy Timber Co. (Great Barrier Island).
- Bradley, Cairns, and Mander, Kaiwaka (Kaipara).
- W.B. Jackson & Co. Ltd., Pupuki W.W. Jackson, Pupuki (Hokianga and Whangaroa).
- E.S. Dufaur, Auckland (Interest in freehold and leasehold lands in Kaipara district).
- Whangaroa Rafting Co., Whangaroa.
- Whangaroa Saw Mill Co., Whangaroa.
- William Meikle, Mercury Bay.
- J. Trounson.

== Gallery ==
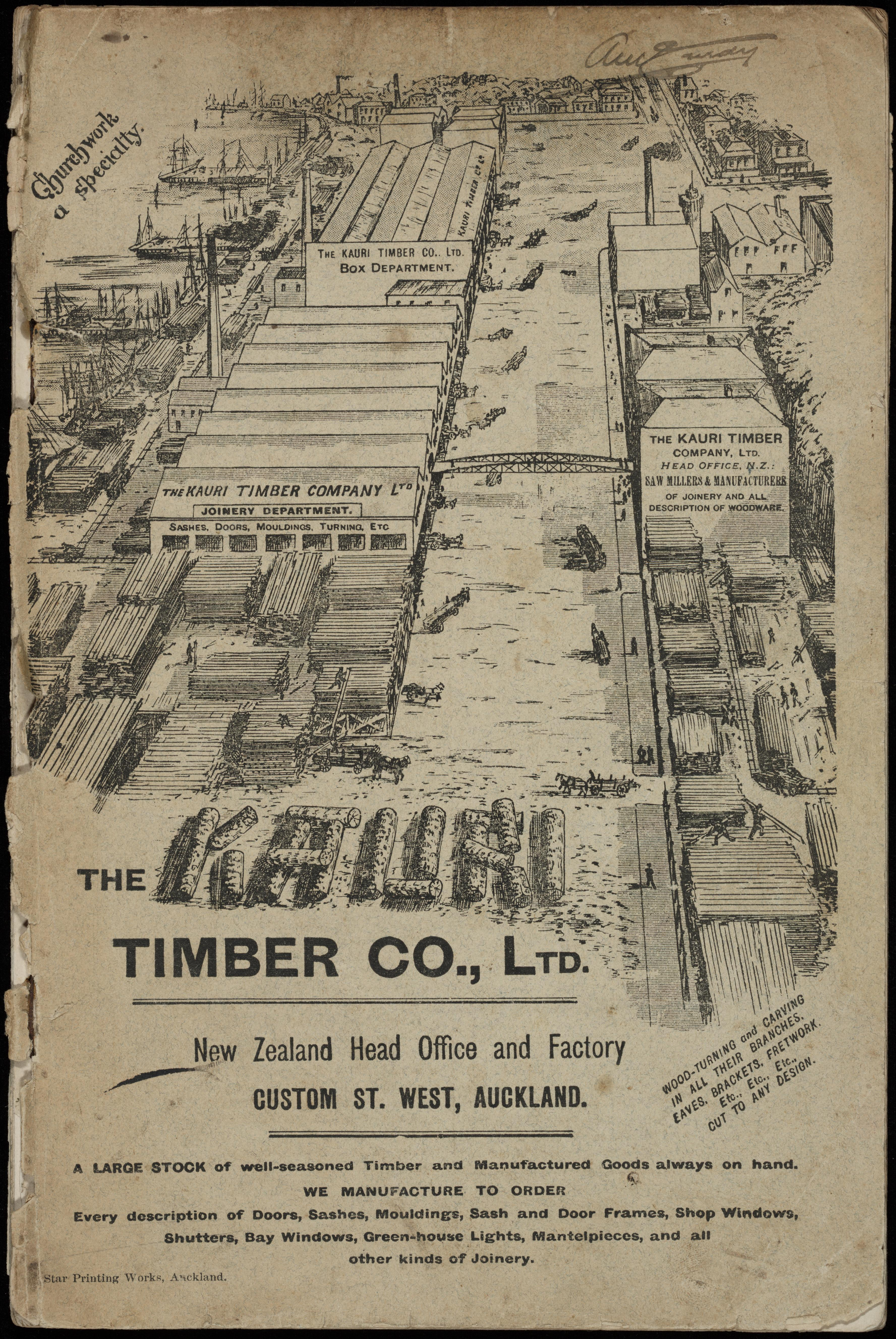
Premises at Custom Street West, Auckland, with the Joinery and Box Departments at the left, and the head office at the right, joined by an overhead walkway, c. 1906

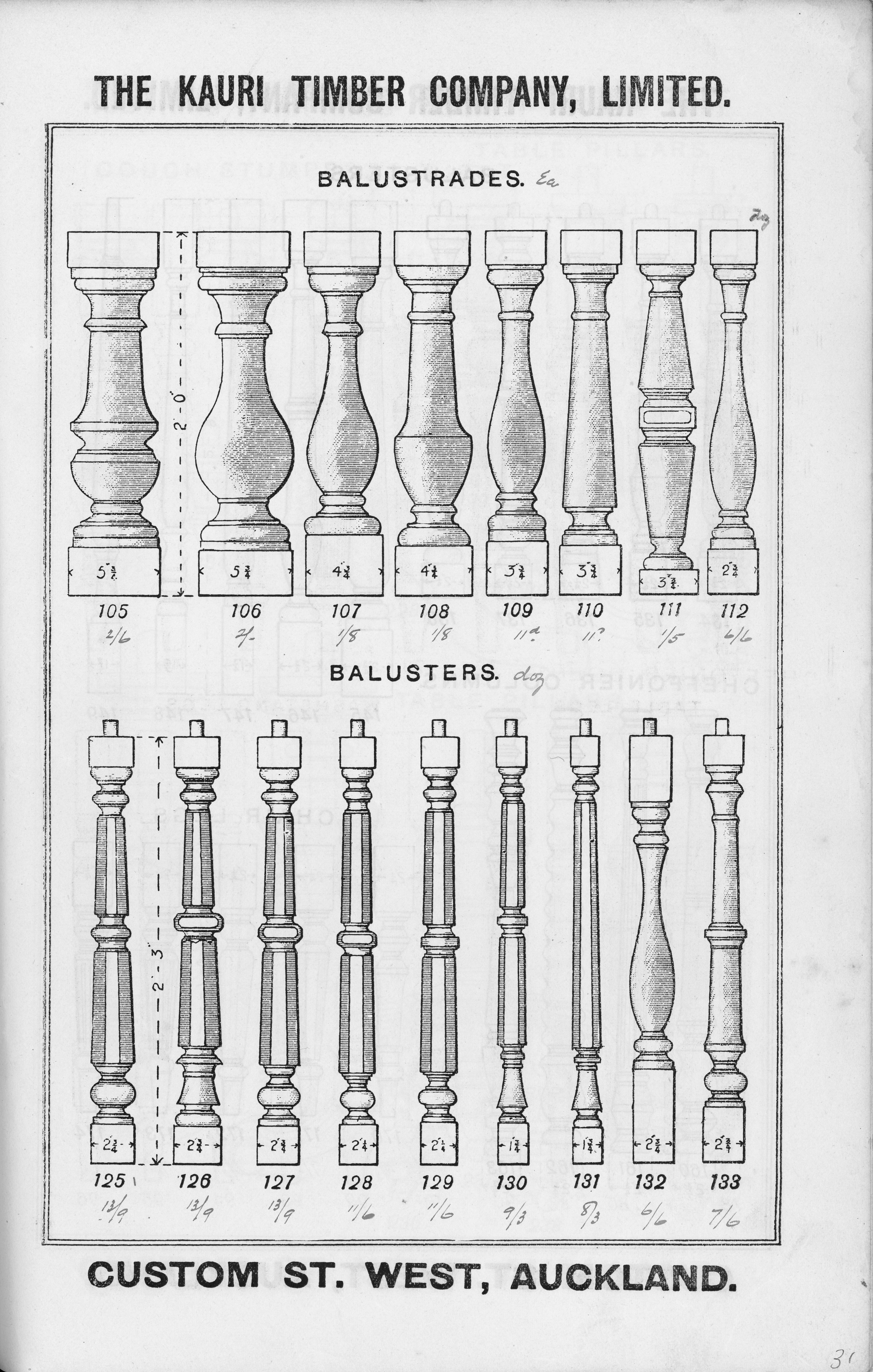
Balustrades and balusters, c. 1906

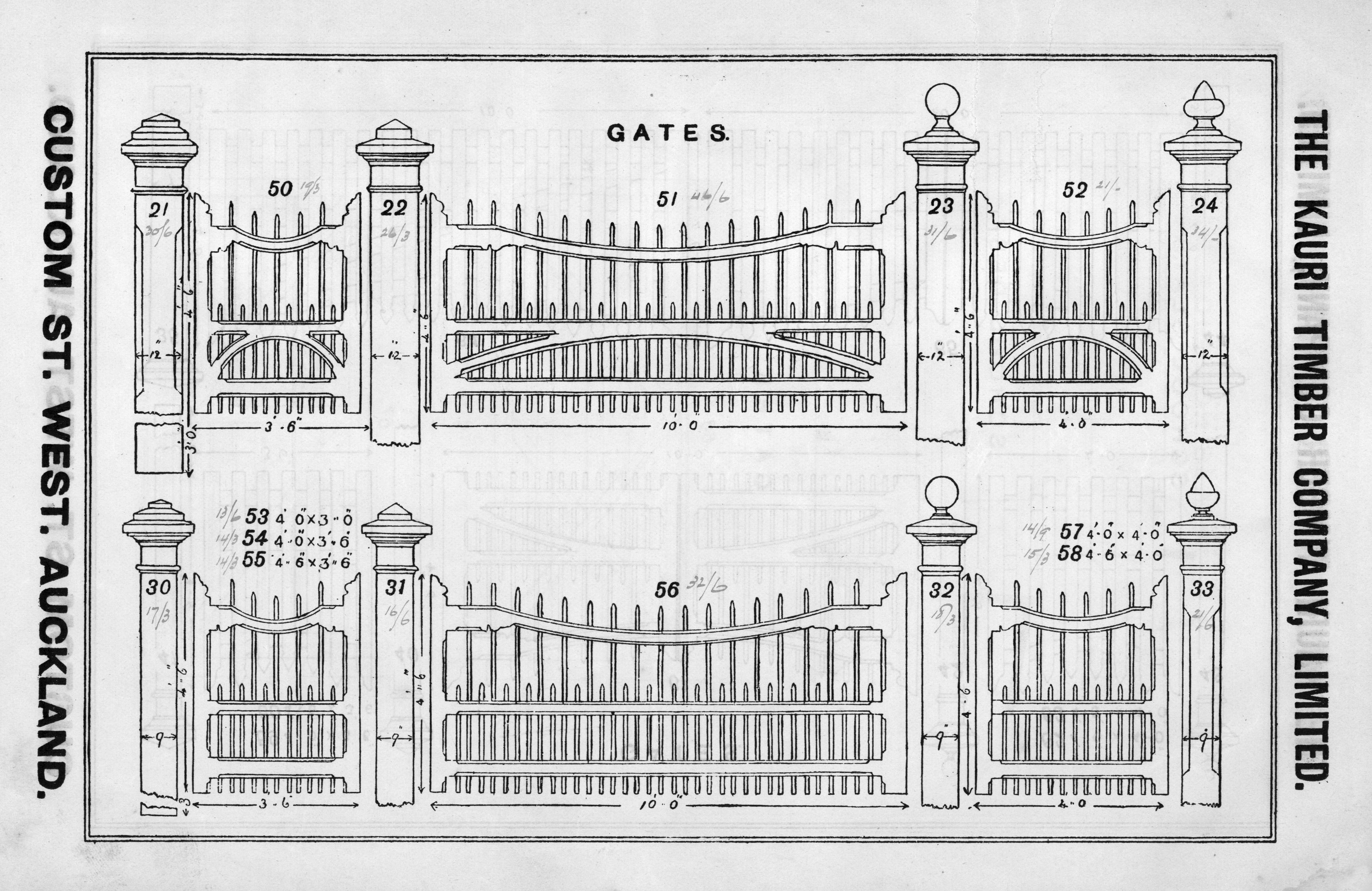
Gates, c. 1906

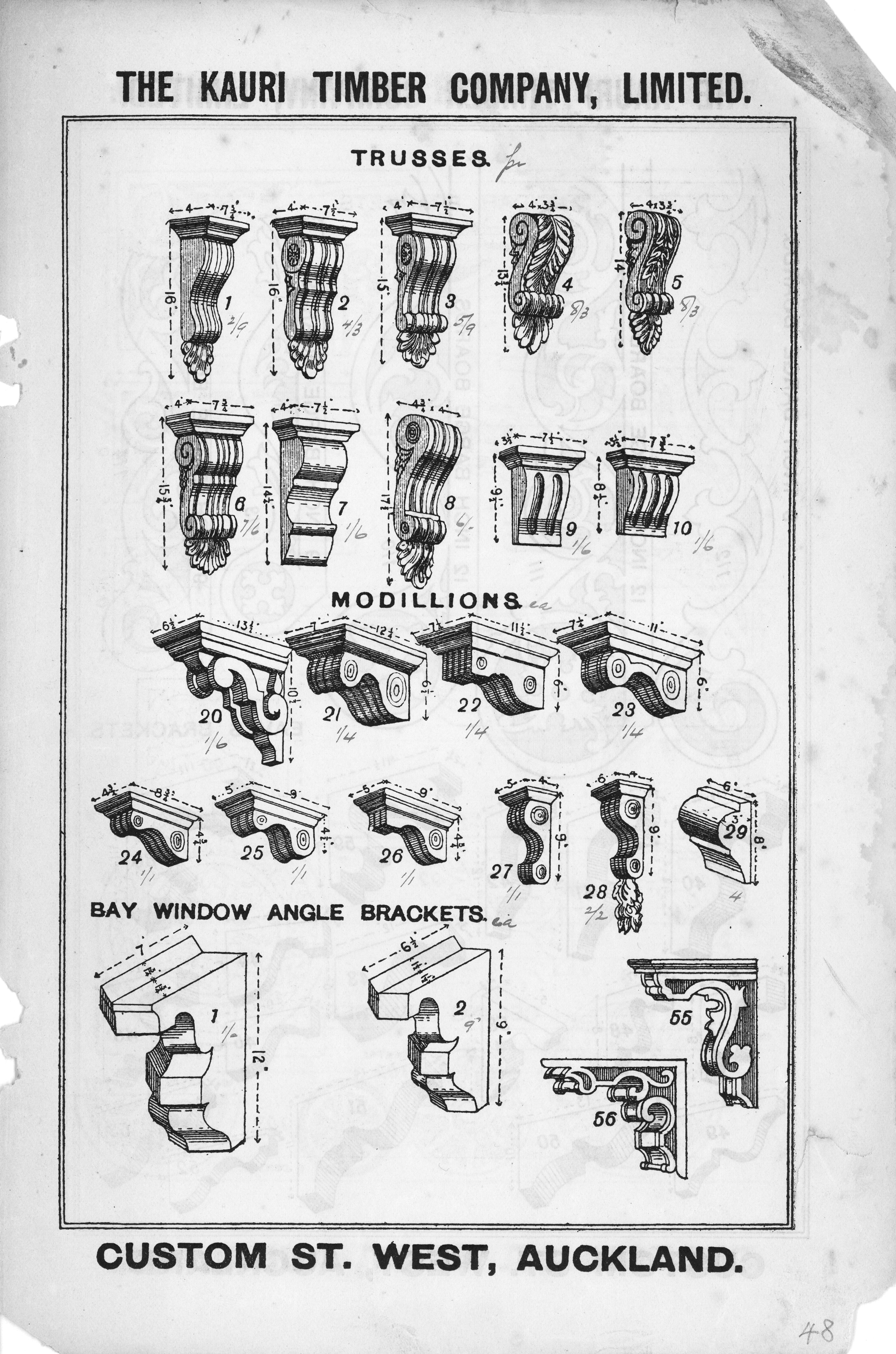
Trusses, c. 1906
