= List of shipwrecks in 1855 =

The list of shipwrecks in 1855 includes ships sunk, wrecked or otherwise lost during 1855.

table of contents
← 1854 / 1855 / 1856 →
Jan	Feb	Mar	Apr
May	Jun	Jul	Aug
Sep	Oct	Nov	Dec
Unknown date

== Unknown date ==
List of shipwrecks: Unknown date 1855
Ship	State	Description
A. Cheesborough, and Invincible	United States; United Kingdom	The full-rigged ship A. Cheesborough was run down and sunk in the Yangtze by Invincible, which was on a voyage from Shanghai, China to London. Invincible put in to Hong Kong and was beached.
Adventure	(United Kingdom of Great Britain and Ireland) New South Wales	The schooner was wrecked at the mouth of the Richmond River on the coast of New South Wales, Australia.
Andromether	United Kingdom	The ship foundered off the Canary Islands.
Ann Black	United Kingdom	The ship ran aground in the Thanlwin. She was on a voyage from Moulmein, Burma to London. She was consequently condemned.
Aspasia	United Kingdom	The ship was destroyed by fire in the Atlantic Ocean. Her crew survived. She was on a voyage from New York to Liverpool, Lancashire.
Bessie Neal	United States	The fishing schooner was lost on the passage from Prince Edward Island to Gloucester, Massachusetts. Lost with all 5 crew.
Countess of Seafield	United Kingdom	The full-rigged ship was wrecked on shoals near Pratas Island between 8 March and 28 May. She was on a voyage from Shanghai, China to London. She was later refloated and towed in to Whampoa, China.
Enterprise	United Kingdom	The ship was wrecked on the Beson Reef. Her crew were rescued. She was on a voyage from Belize City, British Honduras to a British port.
Herald	(United Kingdom of Great Britain and Ireland) Guernsey	The ship was lost off the Falkland Islands with the loss of her captain. She was on a voyage from London to Valparaíso, Chile.
Highflyer	United States	The full-rigged ship was wrecked on Formosa between 21 September and 20 December. Her crew were murdered by the local inhabitants and the ship was burnt.
Janet	United Kingdom	The ship was lost whilst on a voyage from Santa Cruz to London.
Living Age	United Kingdom	The ship was wrecked on Pratas Island.
Lucy Sharp	United Kingdom	The ship was lost in the Rangoon River. She was on a voyage from Akyab, Burma to a British port.
Nashwauk	United Kingdom	The ship was driven ashore and wrecked near Adelaide, South Australia. She was on a voyage from Liverpool to Adelaide.
Peruvian	United Kingdom	The ship was driven ashore on "Egg Island", British North America in the autumn of 1855. She was on a voyage from Liverpool to Quebec City, Province of Canada, British North America. She was refloated in July 1856 and taken in to Quebec City.
Queen of the Isle	United Kingdom	Engaged in the emigrant trade between the United Kingdom and Australia, the barque departed Glasgow, Scotland, in December 1854, arrived at Sydney, New South Wales in March 1855, subsequently left Sydney, traversed the South Pacific Ocean, rounded Cape Horn, and was wrecked off the Falkland Islands.
Spree	(United Kingdom of Great Britain and Ireland) New South Wales	The brig was wrecked at Port-de-France, New Caledonia before 5 May with the loss of seven of her crew.
Tom Bowling	United Kingdom	The ship was wrecked on or near Pratas Island.
Van	United States	The fishing schooner was lost on Folly Island, Maine. Crew saved.
Venus	United Kingdom	The brig was lost in Freeman's Channel after 28 August. She was on a voyage from Manila, Spanish East Indies to Melbourne, Victoria.
Waterloo	United Kingdom	The ship was wrecked on the east coast of Saint Domingo. She was on a voyage from Saint Domingo to Liverpool.
