= List of shipwrecks in 1853 =

The list of shipwrecks in 1853 includes ships sunk, foundered, wrecked, grounded, or otherwise lost during 1853.

table of contents
← 1852 / 1853 / 1854 →
Jan	Feb	Mar	Apr
May	Jun	Jul	Aug
Sep	Oct	Nov	Dec
Unknown date

== Unknown date ==
List of shipwrecks: Unknown date 1853
Ship	State	Description
Adele	United Kingdom	The ship was lost on the Northern Triangles.
Atar Gull	Grand Duchy of Tuscany	The brig was wrecked on the French or Spanish coast. She was on a voyage from Boston, Massachusetts to Livorno.
USCS Belle	United States Coast Survey	The schooner sank. She was later raised, repaired and returned to service.
Brothers	United Kingdom	The barque foundered in the Atlantic Ocean between 21 May and 13 August. Her crew were rescued by Jane Howard (United Kingdom). Brothers was on a voyage from Callao, Peru to an English port.
Caldera	United States	The barque was wrecked on Fanning Island before 10 June. All on board were rescued. She was on a voyage from Batavia, Netherlands East Indies to Sydney, New South Wales and San Francisco, California.
Clara	United States	The brig was wrecked by a tornado off Sierra Leone. Her crew were rescued.
Countess of Lonsdale	United Kingdom	The steamship was wrecked in the River Plate. She was on a voyage from Buenos Aires, Argentina to Montevideo, Uruguay.
Earl of Charlemont	United Kingdom	The ship was wrecked at Port Phillip, Australia. She was on a voyage from Liverpool, Lancashire to Port Phillip.
Elizabeth Benyon	United Kingdom	The ship was wrecked at Saint Domingo.
Ellen	United Kingdom	The smack foundered in the Bristol Channel off Oxwich Point, Glamorgan with the loss of two of her crew. She was on a voyage from Milford Haven, Pembrokeshire to Bristol, Gloucestershire.
Epervier	France	The ship was driven ashore and wrecked at Beyrout, Ottoman Syria.
Grand Turk	Unknown	The schooner was lost at "Squan Inlet." "Squan" and "Squan Beach" were terms used at the time for the coast of New Jersey near Manasquan and sometimes for the 7-mile (11 km) stretch of coast between Manasquan Inlet and Cranberry Inlet or for the entire coast of New Jersey between Sea Girt and Barnegat Inlet. "Squan Inlet" may refer to Manasquan Inlet or another inlet in the area.
Houqua	United States	The clipper was in collision with the ferry Tonawanda (United States) in New York Harbor. Subsequently repaired and returned to service.
Ida	United Kingdom	The brig was lost in the Roman River, Bay of Honduras.
Jeune Edouard	France	The ship was driven ashore on Madagascar and abandoned by her crew before 1 May. She was on a voyage from Réunion to Nantes, Loire-Inférieure.
Louisiana	France	The ship was lost off the coast of the Gambia Colony and Protectorate.
Mahomed Shah	Flag unknown	The ship was destroyed by fire. She was on a voyage from London to New Zealand.
Marmion	United Kingdom	The ship was wrecked on the coast of Australia with the loss of three of her crew.
Martha	United Kingdom	The lorcha was wrecked on Tongatapu with the loss of all hands. The ship's dog survived. She was on a voyage from San Francisco, California, United States to Tongatapu.
Melicite	United Kingdom	The ship was wrecked between 4 October and 10 November. She was on a voyage from Halifax, Nova Scotia, British North America to Liverpool.
Monongahela	United States	The 497-ton whaling ship was lost with all hands in the Catherine Archipelago.
USCS Morris	United States Coast Survey	The schooner sank at Pensacola, Florida. She was later raised, repaired, and returned to service.
Nina	United Kingdom	The ship was abandoned at sea. Some of her crew were rescued by Antilles (Flag unknown), which lost three men when a boat capsized. Nina was on a voyage from Bristol, Gloucestershire to Melbourne, Victoria. She was subsequently taken in to Batavia, Netherlands East Indies in a derelict condition.
Opossum	(United Kingdom of Great Britain and Ireland) South Australia	The cutter was wrecked at Point Nepean, Victoria.
Oriental Queen	United Kingdom	The ship was wrecked at Port Phillip.
Oriole	United Kingdom	The barque was wrecked at the mouth of the Columbia River.
Oscar	(United Kingdom of Great Britain and Ireland) British North America	The brig was wrecked in the Bahamas.
Ptarmigan	United Kingdom	The East Indiaman was wrecked on a reef off "Munsoorcottah", India with the loss of four of her crew.
Sea	United Kingdom	The full-rigged ship was driven ashore at Point Nepean, Victoria.
Skimmer	United Kingdom	The hulk was destroyed by an explosion in the Benin River with loss of life.
Vocalist	United Kingdom	The ship was wrecked near "Cape St. Mary's", Argentina.
