= List of shipwrecks in 1848 =

The list of shipwrecks in 1848 includes ships sunk, foundered, wrecked, grounded, or otherwise lost during 1848.

table of contents
← 1847 / 1848 / 1849 →
Jan	Feb	Mar	Apr
May	Jun	Jul	Aug
Sep	Oct	Nov	Dec
Unknown date

== Unknown date ==
List of shipwrecks: Unknown date in 1848
Ship	State	Description
Arachne	(United Kingdom of Great Britain and Ireland) Van Diemen's Land	The whaler was driven ashore and wrecked in Trial Bay, New South Wales.
USS Austin	United States Navy	The sloop-of-war was beached at Pensacola Navy Yard, Florida. She was subsequently dismantled.
Caupolician	Chile	The ship was wrecked in the Gambier Islands. She was on a voyage from Valparaíso to the Gambier Islands and Tahiti.
Conqueror	United Kingdom	The paddle tug caught fire and was scuttled in Loch Kyles. Subsequently refloated, rebuilt and returned to service.
Fair Play	United States	The ship was abandoned in the Atlantic Ocean. Her crew were rescued by United States (United States). Fair Play was on a voyage from Philadelphia, Pennsylvania to Barbados.
Jemmapes	French Navy	The 100-gun ship of the line was driven ashore at Civitavecchia in the Papal States in October or November.
Jewess	United States	The 200-foot (61.0 m) sidewheel paddle steamer burned while she was moored at Baltimore, Maryland, when a fire spread to her from another ship. She was repaired and returned to service.
Kelpie	United Kingdom	The barque departed from Hong Kong for Shanghai, China in September or earlier. No further trace, presumed foundered with the loss of all hands.
Mischief	United Kingdom	The schooner departed from Hong Kong for Shanghai in September or earlier. No further trace, presumed foundered with the loss of all hands.
Nelson	United Kingdom	The ship departed from Manila, Spanish East Indies for a port in New Zealand. No further trace, presumed foundered with the loss of all hands.
Rainbow	United States	The ship was lost whilst on a voyage from New York to Peru.
Sam Slick	United Kingdom	The ship was driven ashore in the Gambia River. She was refloated but was consequently condemned.
