= List of shipwrecks in 1856 =

The list of shipwrecks in 1856 includes ships sunk, foundered, wrecked, grounded, or otherwise lost during 1856.

table of contents
← 1855 / 1856 / 1857 →
Jan	Feb	Mar	Apr
May	Jun	Jul	Aug
Sep	Oct	Nov	Dec
Unknown date

== Unknown date ==
List of shipwrecks: Unknown date in 1856
Ship	State	Description
A. B. Chambers	United States	The steamboat sank in the Missouri River near Atchison, Kansas.
Alpha	United States	The schooner was lost in the Gut of Canso. Crew saved.
Amazon	United States	The steamboat sank at the mouth of the Missouri River.
Annie Scott	United Kingdom	The brig ran aground on a reef off the Brazilian coast. She was refloated with assistance from Olinda (Imperial Brazilian Navy).
Ann Rose	United Kingdom	The ship foundered. She was on a voyage from Liverpool, Lancashire to Calcutta, India.
Banca	United Kingdom	The ship was destroyed by fire at Hong Kong.
Bermuda	United Kingdom	The ship foundered in the Atlantic Ocean. Her twelve crew were rescued by Saucy Lass (United Kingdom. Bermuda was on a voyage from Demerara, British Guiana to London.
C. M. Wittusen	Denmark	The ship foundered with the loss of all hands between 11 November and 26 December. She was on a voyage from Næstved to a British port.
Coromandel	United Kingdom	The barque was lost in the South China Sea between 19 June and 16 December. She was on a voyage from Liverpool to Hong Kong.
Mary	United Kingdom	The ship foundered in the Atlantic Ocean. Her crew were rescued. She was on a voyage from New York to Glasgow, Renfrewshire.
Neva	United Kingdom	The ship was wrecked at the Sand Heads, India. She was on a voyage from Calcutta to London.
Posa	Hamburg	The ship was abandoned in the Pacific Ocean after 3 October. She was on a voyage from Lisbon, Portugal to Hong Kong.
Prince	United Kingdom	The ship was damaged by fire at Indian Cove, Newfoundland between 24 October and 3 November. She was on a voyage from Quebec City, Province of Canada, British North America to Newry, County Antrim. Arson was suspected; five of her crew were taken into custody.
Recovery	United Kingdom	The ship was wrecked on the Conflict Reefs, off the Nunez River in modern-day Guinea. On voyage to England with timber, all crew were rescued.
Regia	United Kingdom	The ship was lost off Faro, Portugal between 15 February and 15 March. She was on a voyage from Cardiff, Glamorgan to Constantinople, Ottoman Empire.
Ruyter	Netherlands	The ship was wrecked at Marseille, Bouches-du-Rhone, France between 29 November and 2 December.
Samuel Jones	United States	The schooner was lost in the Bay of St. Lawrence. Crew saved.
Sea Witch	United States	The clipper ran aground in the Gulf of Mexico off Havana, Cuba, and was wrecked.
Sigisbert	France	The ship was lost off the "Isles of Suat". She was on a voyage from Pondicherry, India to Paris.
Sir Isaac Lyon Goldsmid	United Kingdom	The ship was wrecked on the coast of Cuba.
Tongataboo	United Kingdom	The ship was wrecked in the Mergui Archipelago, Burma between 11 October and 7 November. She was on a voyage from Moulmein to an English port.
Usk	United Kingdom	The ship was abandoned off the Cape of Good Hope, Cape Colony. She was on a voyage from Akyab, Burma to Falmouth, Cornwall.
