= Wainui River (Northland) =

- Course of the Wainui River
- Location of the Wainui River in Northland

Location
- Country: New Zealand

Physical characteristics
- Mouth: Oruaiti River
  - coordinates: 35.0855°S 173.6415°E
- Length: 18 km (11 mi)

The Wainui River is a river of the Northland Region of New Zealand's North Island. It flows generally northeast from its sources at the eastern end of the Maungataniwha Range to reach the Oruaiti River five kilometres southwest of the Whangaroa Harbour.

== See also ==
- List of rivers of New Zealand
