= List of shipwrecks in 1857 =

The list of shipwrecks in 1857 includes ships sunk, wrecked or otherwise lost during 1857.

table of contents
1857
Jan	Feb	Mar	Apr
May	Jun	Jul	Aug
Sep	Oct	Nov	Dec
Unknown date

== Unknown date ==
List of shipwrecks: Unknown date 1857
Ship	State	Description
USCS Belle	United States Coast Survey	The schooner was wrecked in St. Andrews Bay, Florida.
Calabar	United Kingdom	The ship was wrecked on the west coast of Africa between 1 July and 8 October. She was on a voyage from Liverpool, Lancashire to Bonny.
Clara Brookman	Unknown	The full-rigged ship was lost in the vicinity of "Squan Beach," a term used at the time for the coast of New Jersey near Manasquan and sometimes for the 7-mile (11 km) stretch of coast between Manasquan Inlet and Cranberry Inlet or for the entire coast of New Jersey between Sea Girt and Barnegat Inlet.
Cuba	Imperial Russian Navy	The steamship struck a rock and sank in the Caspian Sea with the loss of 22 of her crew.
Dayspring	United Kingdom	The steamship was lost in the Niger River near "Rahbee".
Frolic	France	The schooner ran aground on the Sunk Sand, in the North Sea off the coast of Essex, United Kingdom. She was refloated with assistance from the smack Increase (United Kingdom).
Golden Fleece	United States	While entering the Golden Gate, the clipper struck Four Fathom Bar off Point Bonita, California, and was run up on the mud flats. She later made it to the wharf at San Francisco, California, with 12 to 14 feet (3.7 to 4.3 meters) of water in her hold.
Helena	United States	The ship foundered whilst on a voyage from China to Havana, Cuba.
Industry	United Kingdom	The paddle steamer struck a rock off Renfrew, Scotland, and sank. Later refloated, repaired, and returned to service.
Little Belt	United Kingdom	The smack was wrecked at Chesil Beach, Dorset.
Maria	United Kingdom	The brig was driven ashore and wrecked in the Crozet Islands.
Mary Mackertoon	United Kingdom	The ship was wrecked on the coast of Formosa. Her crew was rescued.
Minerva	Unknown	The full-rigged ship was lost at Cranberry Inlet on the coast of New Jersey.
Némésis	French Navy	The Némésis-class frigate ran aground in the Bangka Strait.
Ocean Spray	United States	The clipper was abandoned at sea. She was on a voyage from New York to Madras, India.
Palermo	(United Kingdom of Great Britain and Ireland) New South Wales	The brig was wrecked in the Fiji Islands. She was on a voyage from Sydney to the South Sea Islands.
Rajah of Sarawak	India	The ship was driven ashore on "Maneater's Island". She was on a voyage from Bombay to China. She was refloated and taken into Batavia, Netherlands East Indies in a leaky condition.
Sarah Ann	Chile	The brigantine was wrecked in the Paumonton Islands in or before May 1857. Her crew was killed and eaten by cannibals. She was on a voyage from Valparaíso to the South Sea islands.
Samuel Willets	Unknown	The full-rigged ship was lost in the vicinity of "Squan," a term used at the time for the coast of New Jersey near Manasquan and sometimes for the 7-mile (11 km) stretch of coast between Manasquan Inlet and Cranberry Inlet or for the entire coast of New Jersey between Sea Girt and Barnegat Inlet.
Wallachia	United Kingdom	The brig ran aground in the Dardanelles. She was on a voyage from London to Trebizond, Ottoman Empire. She was refloated and taken into Constantinople, Ottoman Empire for repairs.
Warburton	United Kingdom	The ship was run into by Margaret (United Kingdom) and was beached on Anticosti Island, Nova Scotia, British North America. Her crew survived and spent the winter on the island. She was on a voyage from Quebec City, Province of Canada, British North America to London.
