= Lake Waingaro =

Lake in the North Island of New Zealand

- Location within Northland Region
- Location: Northland Region, North Island
- Coordinates: 35.261210°S 173.879216°E
- Basin countries: New Zealand

Lake Waingaro is a lake in the Northland Region of New Zealand. The lake is the main source of water for the Kerikeri Town Water Supply.

== See also ==
- List of lakes in New Zealand
