= Kenana River =

Coordinates: 35.029007°S 173.563123°E

Location
- Country: New Zealand

Physical characteristics
- Mouth
  - location: Doubtless Bay
- Length: 8 km (5.0 mi)

The Kenana River is a river of the North Auckland Peninsula, in New Zealand's North Island. It is located in the north of the peninsula, and flows into Mangonui harbour, an inlet in the south of Doubtless Bay.

== See also ==
- List of rivers of New Zealand
