= Waipapa =

- Interactive map of Waipapa
- Coordinates: 35°12′25″S 173°55′01″E
- Country: New Zealand
- Region: Northland Region
- District: Far North District
- Ward: Bay of Islands-Whangaroa
- Community: Bay of Islands-Whangaroa
- Subdivision: Waipapa
- Electorates: Northland; Te Tai Tokerau (Māori electorate)

Government
  - Territorial Authority: Far North District Council
  - Regional council: Northland Regional Council
  - Mayor of Far North: Moko Tepania
  - Northland MP: Grant McCallum
  - Te Tai Tokerau MP: Mariameno Kapa-Kingi

Area
  - Total: 1.07 km^{2} (0.41 sq mi)

Population (June 2025)
  - Total: 150
  - Density: 140/km^{2} (360/sq mi)
- Postcode(s): 0230

Waipapa is a small town in the Bay of Islands, Northland, New Zealand. It is located on State Highway 10, approximately 10 minutes drive from Kerikeri, the nearest urban centre. Waipapa itself has no school with most pupils travelling to Kerikeri on a daily basis. It is governed by the Far North District council.

== Demographics ==
Statistics New Zealand describes Waipapa as a rural settlement. It covers 1.07 km^{2} (0.41 sq mi) and had an estimated population of 150 as of June 2025, with a population density of 140 people per km^{2}. The settlement is part of the larger Waipapa statistical area.

Historical population for Waipapa settlement
| Year | Pop. | ±% p.a. |
|---|---|---|
| 2006 | 129 | — |
| 2013 | 171 | +4.11% |
| 2018 | 174 | +0.35% |
| 2023 | 156 | −2.16% |

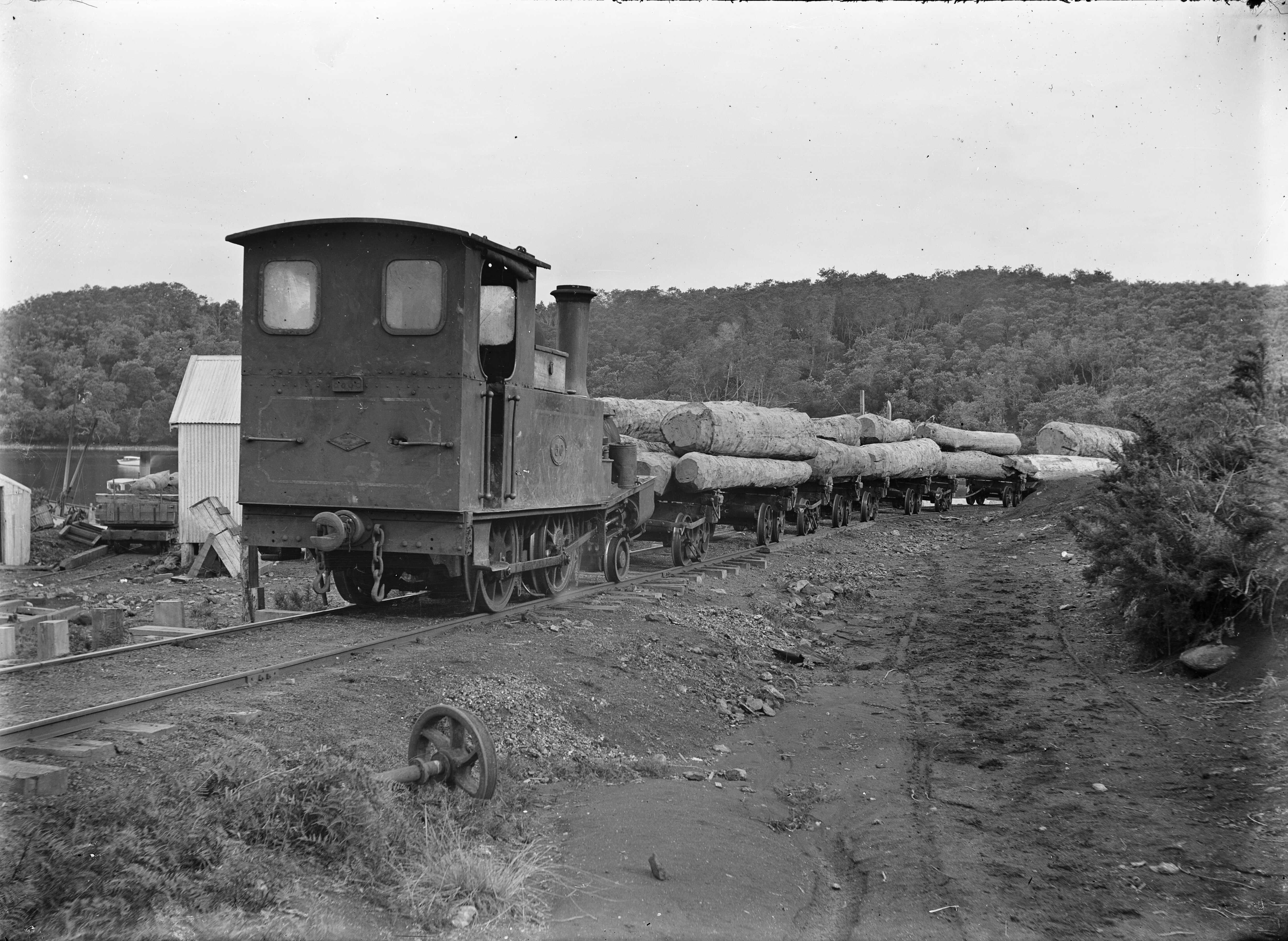
Kauri Timber Company's timber train at Waipapa, laden with logs, 1912

Waipapa settlement had a population of 156 in the 2023 New Zealand census, a decrease of 18 people (−10.3%) since the 2018 census, and a decrease of 15 people (−8.8%) since the 2013 census. There were 78 males and 81 females in 54 dwellings. 3.8% of people identified as LGBTIQ+. The median age was 32.3 years (compared with 38.1 years nationally). There were 45 people (28.8%) aged under 15 years, 30 (19.2%) aged 15 to 29, 63 (40.4%) aged 30 to 64, and 21 (13.5%) aged 65 or older.

People could identify as more than one ethnicity. The results were 76.9% European (Pākehā); 40.4% Māori; 3.8% Pasifika; 3.8% Asian; and 1.9% Middle Eastern, Latin American and African New Zealanders (MELAA). English was spoken by 98.1%, Māori language by 9.6%, Samoan by 1.9% and other languages by 7.7%. No language could be spoken by 3.8% (e.g. too young to talk). The percentage of people born overseas was 11.5, compared with 28.8% nationally.

The only religious affiliation given was 17.3% Christian. People who answered that they had no religion were 76.9%, and 5.8% of people did not answer the census question.

Of those at least 15 years old, 12 (10.8%) people had a bachelor's or higher degree, 72 (64.9%) had a post-high school certificate or diploma, and 33 (29.7%) people exclusively held high school qualifications. The median income was $36,000, compared with $41,500 nationally. 6 people (5.4%) earned over $100,000 compared to 12.1% nationally. The employment status of those at least 15 was that 51 (45.9%) people were employed full-time, 15 (13.5%) were part-time, and 6 (5.4%) were unemployed.

=== Waipapa statistical area ===
The statistical area of Waipapa covers 8.01 km^{2} (3.09 sq mi) and had an estimated population of 930 as of June 2025, with a population density of 116 people per km^{2}.

Historical population for the Waipapa statistical area
| Year | Pop. | ±% p.a. |
|---|---|---|
| 2006 | 537 | — |
| 2013 | 702 | +3.90% |
| 2018 | 822 | +3.21% |
| 2023 | 891 | +1.63% |
The 2006 population is for a larger area of 9.16 km^{2} Source:

Waipapa had a population of 891 in the 2023 New Zealand census, an increase of 69 people (8.4%) since the 2018 census, and an increase of 189 people (26.9%) since the 2013 census. There were 435 males and 456 females in 312 dwellings. 3.4% of people identified as LGBTIQ+. The median age was 41.0 years (compared with 38.1 years nationally). There were 192 people (21.5%) aged under 15 years, 138 (15.5%) aged 15 to 29, 417 (46.8%) aged 30 to 64, and 147 (16.5%) aged 65 or older.

People could identify as more than one ethnicity. The results were 86.2% European (Pākehā); 21.2% Māori; 3.0% Pasifika; 5.1% Asian; 1.0% Middle Eastern, Latin American and African New Zealanders (MELAA); and 2.7% other, which includes people giving their ethnicity as "New Zealander". English was spoken by 98.0%, Māori language by 5.4%, Samoan by 0.3% and other languages by 8.8%. No language could be spoken by 1.7% (e.g. too young to talk). New Zealand Sign Language was known by 0.7%. The percentage of people born overseas was 20.5, compared with 28.8% nationally.

Religious affiliations were 19.2% Christian, 0.7% Hindu, 0.3% Islam, 0.7% Māori religious beliefs, 0.7% Buddhist, 0.3% New Age, and 0.7% other religions. People who answered that they had no religion were 73.4%, and 5.1% of people did not answer the census question.

Of those at least 15 years old, 105 (15.0%) people had a bachelor's or higher degree, 429 (61.4%) had a post-high school certificate or diploma, and 147 (21.0%) people exclusively held high school qualifications. The median income was $38,200, compared with $41,500 nationally. 60 people (8.6%) earned over $100,000 compared to 12.1% nationally. The employment status of those at least 15 was that 333 (47.6%) people were employed full-time, 117 (16.7%) were part-time, and 18 (2.6%) were unemployed.

== Features ==
=== Airport ===
The nearest airport to Waipapa is the Kerikeri Airport, which serves all of the Bay of Islands.

=== Business ===
Most businesses in Waipapa are located on State Highway 10, with the biggest store, The Warehouse, located on Klinac Lane.

The business area of Waipapa is expanding rapidly. It now contains over 120 retail, service, commercial and light industrial businesses in the Waipapa shopping area.

=== Culture ===
Waipapa's local Māori iwi is the Ngāpuhi. One of the roads in Waipapa is named Ngapuhi Road.

=== Water features ===
Waipapa, being inland, has no beaches, but does have a landing named after the Waipapa Stream which runs just to the north of it where it meets the Kerikeri Inlet, close to Kerikeri's Stone Store. To the south of Waipapa runs the Kerikeri River, on which is the popular Rainbow Falls.
