= List of shipwrecks in 1850 =

The list of shipwrecks in 1850 includes ships sunk, foundered, wrecked, grounded, or otherwise lost during 1850.

table of contents
1850
Jan	Feb	Mar	Apr
May	Jun	Jul	Aug
Sep	Oct	Nov	Dec
Unknown date

== Unknown date ==
List of shipwrecks: Unknown date 1850
Ship	State	Description
Adonis	United Kingdom	The ship was driven ashore between Bonny and Calabar, Africa. She was consequently condemned.
Albert Braser	(United Kingdom of Great Britain and Ireland) South Australia	The schooner was blown out to sea from Port Phillip. No further trace, presumed foundered.
Arabella	United Kingdom	The barque was wrecked in the River Plate.
Ariadne	United Kingdom	The ship was lost before 9 October.
Brothers	(United Kingdom of Great Britain and Ireland) Van Diemen's Land	The ship caught fire whilst on a voyage from Launceston to Alta California. The fire burned for 14 days. before it was extinguished. She put back to Launceston, where she arrived on 7 June.
Caledonia	United Kingdom	The ship was wrecked on Saint Domingo.
Courageux	France	The schooner foundered in the Bristol Channel in late November or early December with the loss of all hands.
Dumfries	United Kingdom	The ship ran aground on a reef off Batavia, Netherlands East Indies. She was on a voyage from Bombay, India to China. She was refloated and resumed her voyage.
Enterprise	(United Kingdom of Great Britain and Ireland) New South Wales	The schooner was wrecked near Warrnambool.
Francis	United Kingdom	The ship was driven ashore at Gallipoli, Ottoman Empire between 21 January and 4 February.
Gallinipper	United States	The 95-foot (29 m) trading schooner ran aground at Milwaukee, Wisconsin. She was refloated, repaired, and returned to service.
Gazelle	United Kingdom	The ship was driven ashore and wrecked at Tampico, Mexico. Her crew were rescued. She was on a voyage from Liverpool, Lancashire to Tampico.
Isabella	United Kingdom	The ship was destroyed by fire at Penang, Malaya before 31 August. She was on a voyage from Singapore to Penang.
Jeanne d'Arc	(flag) France	The ship was wrecked on the coast of Africa.
Jenny	France	The ship was driven ashore and wrecked at Veracruz, Mexico.
Julia	Flag unknown	The barque foundered in the Pacific Ocean with the loss of all on board, more than 250 people. She was on a voyage from San Francisco, California, United States to Panama.
Kuril (Курил)	Imperial Russian Navy	The transport ship, a brig, departed from Okhotsk for Petropavlovsk on 14 September. No further trace, presumed foundered with the loss of all 42 people on board. Wreckage possibly belonging to the ship washed up the following year on Atka Island in the Aleutians.
Manuela	United Kingdom	The barque was abandoned in the Strait of Magellan. Her crew were rescued by Taboga (United States).
North Carolina	United States	The ship was wrecked on the coast of Puerto Rico. Her crew survived, but were imprisoned at Mayagüez. They were released when USS Albany (United States Navy) threatened to bombard the town with her cannons.
Octavia	United Kingdom	The barque was wrecked at "Port St. Maita". Her crew were rescued. She was on a voyage from Valparaíso, Chile to a port in Panama.
Olympe	France	The ship was destroyed by fire at San Francisco, Alta California.
Orion	Unknown	The barque was lost in the vicinity of "Squan," a term used at the time for the coast of New Jersey near Manasquan and sometimes for the 7-mile (11 km) stretch of coast between Manasquan Inlet and Cranberry Inlet or for the entire coast of New Jersey between Sea Girt and Barnegat Inlet.
Pfundstuck	Norway	The barque sprang a leak and foundered with the loss of at least five lives. A message in a bottle was discovered off Finistère by some French fishermen stating that she had foundered.
Proteus	Prussia	The ship foundered in the Atlantic Ocean between 30 April and 18 December. She was on a voyage from Holzenburg to New York, United States
Queen	(United Kingdom of Great Britain and Ireland) New Zealand	The schooner was driven ashore and severely damaged in Poverty Bay.
Sandersons	United Kingdom	The ship was lost in the Pacific Ocean. All on board were rescued. She was on a voyage from "Realijo" to Punto Arenas, Chile.
William Hyde	United Kingdom	The ship was wrecked near Hokianga, New Zealand between 25 September and 19 December. She was on a voyage from London to Adelaide, South Australia.
