= Results of the 2025 New Zealand territorial authority elections in Northland =

2025 New Zealand territorial authority elections (Northland)
- 11 October 2025
- Turnout: 65,748 (49.15% ▲7.62 pp)
- 3 of 3 local councils
Party	Councils	+/–
No majority	3	0
This lists parties that won seats. See the complete results below.
- 3 mayors and 31 local councillors
Party	Seats	+/–
Mayors
Independent	3	0
Local councillors
Independent	28	−3
ACT Local	2	+2
Your Voice Our Community	1	+1
This lists parties that won seats. See the complete results below.

Elections for the territorial authorities of New Zealand were held from 9 September until 11 October 2025 as part of that year's nation-wide local elections. 709 local councillors and 66 mayors were elected across 66 of 67 councils.

3 territorial authorities are located within the Northland Region, being the Far North District Council, Whangārei District Council, and Kaipara District Council. 3 mayors and 31 district councillors were elected.

== Maps ==

Legend
Independent hold	Independent gain
	ACT Local gain
	YVOC gain

== Summary ==
=== Overall ===
Council	Electoral system	Seats	Mayor	Councillors	Control	Turnout	Details	Refs
Far North	STV	10	▌ Independent hold	▌ Independent 8 (▼2) ▌ YVOC 1 (▲1) ▌ ACT Local 1 (▲1)	▌ No majority	24,556; 50.68% ▲9.15 pp	Details	
Whangārei	STV	13	▌ Independent gain	▌ Independent 12 ( 0) ▌ ACT Local 1 (▲1)	▌ No majority	30,490; 45.50% ▲2.23 pp	Details	
Kaipara	FPP	8	▌ Independent gain	▌ Independent 8 ( 0)	▌ No majority	10,702; 58.39% ▲10.83 pp	Details	
3 of 3 councils		31						

=== Mayors ===
Council	Incumbent	Elected	Runner-up	Details	Refs
Far North	Moko Tepania (Ind)		Ann Court (YVOC)	Details	
Whangārei	Vince Cocurullo (Ind)	Ken Couper (Ind)	Vince Cocurullo (Ind)	Details	
Kaipara	Craig Jepson^{R} (Ind)	Jonathan Larsen (Ind)	Snow Tane (Ind)	Details	
^{R} did not run for re-election

=== Candidates ===
Party / ticket	Mayors				Councillors			
Party / ticket	2022	Candidates	Elected	+/−	2022	Candidates	Elected	+/−
Independent	3	10	3	0	31	89	28	▼3
ACT Local	no candidates				(new)	4	2	▲2
YVOC	(new)	1	0	0	(new)	3	1	▲1
Sovereign NZ	0	1	0	0	0	1	0	0
Te Pāti Māori	no candidates				1	0	0	▼1
Total:	3	11	3	0	32	97	31	▼1

== Far North District Council ==
2025 Far North District Council election
- 11 October 2025
- Turnout: 24,556 (50.68% ▲9.15 pp)
- Mayor
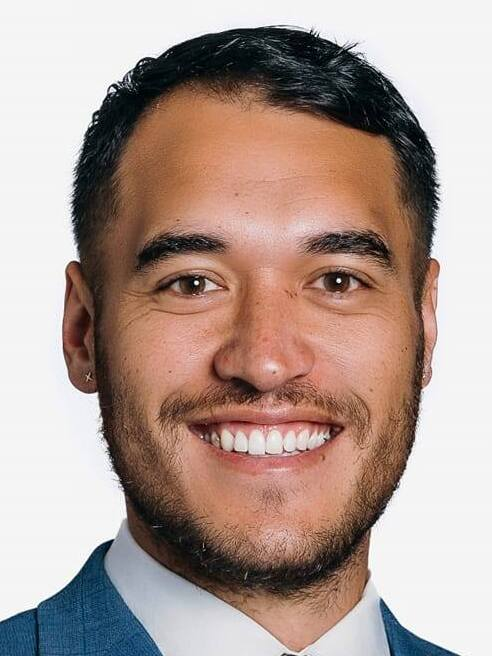

		YVOC
Candidate	Moko Tepania	Ann Court	Joshua Riley
Party	Independent	YVOC	Sovereign NZ
Primary vote	12,744	7,859	3,698
Percentage	51.90%	32.00%	15.06%
Mayor before election
Moko Tepania
Independent
Elected mayor
Moko Tepania
Independent
- Councillors
- 10 seats on the governing body of Far North District Council; 6 seats needed for a majority
Party	Seats	+/–
Independent	8	−2
YVOC	1	+1
ACT Local	1	+1
This lists parties that won seats. See the complete results below.
Control before	Control after
No majority	No majority

=== 2025 Far North mayoral election ===
2025 Far North mayoral election
Party	Candidate	Primary votes	%	±%	Iteration	
Party	Candidate	Primary votes	%	±%	#	Votes
Independent	Moko Tepania^{†}	12,744	51.90	n/a	1st	12,744
YVOC	Ann Court	7,859	32.00	n/a	1st	7,859
Sovereign NZ	Joshua Riley	3,698	15.06	n/a	1st	3,698
Quota		12,151	49.48	+0.09		
Informal votes		55	0.22	−0.30		
Blank votes		200	0.81	−0.07		
Turnout		24,556	50.68	+9.15		
Registered electors		48,451				
Independent hold on 1st iteration						
^{†} incumbent

=== Bay of Islands-Whangaroa general ward ===
2025 Bay of Islands-Whangaroa general ward election
Party	Candidate	Primary votes	%	±%	Iteration	
Party	Candidate	Primary votes	%	±%	#	Votes
YVOC	Ann Court^{†}	3,677	36.65	+1.27	1st	3,677
ACT Local	Davina Smolders	not supplied	n/a	n/a	12th	2,299
Independent	Kelly Anne Stratford^{†}	not supplied	n/a	n/a	13th	2,260
YVOC	Tyler Ian Bamber	not supplied	n/a	(new)	13th	2,065
Sovereign NZ	Joshua Riley	not supplied	n/a	(new)	11th	1,517
Independent	Steve McNally^{†}	not supplied	n/a	n/a	9th	914
YVOC	Shell Wilson	not supplied	n/a	(new)	8th	518
Independent	Jonathan Natusch	not supplied	n/a	(new)	7th	227
Independent	Ray Pitch	not supplied	n/a	(new)	6th	210
Independent	Stuart Beaven	not supplied	n/a	(new)	4th	169
Independent	Ross George Yeager	not supplied	n/a	(new)	3rd	139
Independent	Geoff Hughes	not supplied	n/a	(new)	2nd	117
Quota		2,454	24.46	+0.12		
Informal votes		86	0.86	−0.40		
Blank votes		131	1.31	−0.60		
Turnout		10,034	53.32	+7.85		
Registered electors		18,817				
YVOC gain from Independent on 1st iteration						
ACT Local gain from Independent on 12th iteration						
Independent hold on 13th iteration						
^{†} incumbent

=== Kaikohe-Hokianga general ward ===
2025 Kaikohe-Hokianga general ward election
Party	Candidate	Primary votes	%	±%	Iteration	
Party	Candidate	Primary votes	%	±%	#	Votes
Independent	John Vujcich^{†}	1,825	70.35	+4.16	1st	1,825
Independent	Michael Feyen	673	25.94	(new)	1st	673
Quota		9	0.35	−47.70		
Informal votes		87	3.35	+2.96		
Blank votes		1,249	48.15	+44.63		
Turnout		2,594	51.92	+5.93		
Registered electors		4,996				
Independent hold on 1st iteration						
^{†} incumbent

=== Te Hiku general ward ===
2025 Te Hiku general ward election
Party	Candidate	Primary votes	%	±%	Iteration	
Party	Candidate	Primary votes	%	±%	#	Votes
Independent	Felicity Foy^{†}	not supplied	n/a	n/a	6th	1,640
Independent	Rachel Baucke	not supplied	n/a	(new)	7th	1,514
Independent	John Matthews	not supplied	n/a	n/a	7th	1,134
Independent	Adele Gardner	not supplied	n/a	n/a	6th	598
Independent	Monty Knight	not supplied	n/a	(new)	5th	468
Independent	Garreth Wayne Oien	not supplied	n/a	(new)	4th	414
Independent	Eddie Bellas	not supplied	n/a	(new)	3rd	383
Independent	Bill Subritzky	not supplied	n/a	(new)	2nd	339
Independent	Mark Shanks	251	4.97	(new)	1st	251
Quota		1,642	32.52	+0.06		
Informal votes		81	1.60	−0.08		
Blank votes		43	0.85	−0.63		
Turnout		5,049	50.41	+5.52		
Registered electors		10,015				
Independent hold on 6th iteration						
Independent gain from Independent on 7th iteration						
^{†} incumbent

=== Ngā Tai o Tokerau Māori ward ===
2025 Ngā Tai o Tokerau Māori ward election
Party	Candidate	Primary votes	%	±%	Iteration	
Party	Candidate	Primary votes	%	±%	#	Votes
Independent	Hilda Halkyard-Harawira^{†}	2,297	33.40	+11.02	1st	2,297
Independent	Tāmati Rākena^{†}	not supplied	n/a	n/a	2nd	1,464
Independent	Chicky Rudkin	not supplied	n/a	(new)	3rd	1,311
Independent	Arohanui Takangaroa Allen	not supplied	n/a	(new)	6th	1,376
Independent	Penetaui Kleskovic^{†}	not supplied	n/a	n/a	6th	948
Independent	Babe Kapa^{†}	not supplied	n/a	n/a	4th	666
Independent	Shelly Kawiti-Jessop	not supplied	n/a	(new)	2nd	382
Quota		1,341	19.50	+3.01		
Informal votes		66	0.96	−13.62		
Blank votes		107	1.56	−0.18		
Turnout		6,877	47.03	+15.00		
Registered electors		14,623				
Independent hold on 1st iteration						
Independent hold on 1st iteration						
Independent gain from Independent on 3rd iteration						
Independent gain from Independent on 6th iteration						
^{†} incumbent

=== Referendum on Māori wards ===
Choice	Votes	%
I vote to KEEP Māori wards	13,346	55.69
I vote to REMOVE Māori wards	10,619	44.31
Total	23,965	100.00
Valid votes	23,965	97.59
Invalid votes	17	0.07
Blank votes	574	2.34
Total votes	24,556	100.00
Registered voters/turnout	34,067	72.08
Source: FNDC & MCERT

== Whangārei District Council ==
2025 Whangārei District Council election
- 11 October 2025
- Turnout: 30,490 (45.50% ▲2.23 pp)
- Mayor
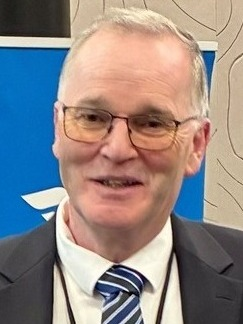

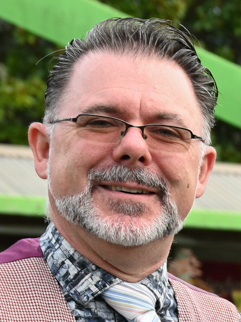

Candidate	Ken Couper	Vince Cocurullo
Party	Independent	Independent
Primary vote	8,668	8,173
Percentage	28.43%	26.81%
Final vote	12,418	11,983
Percentage	50.89%	49.11%
	Ind
Candidate	Marie Olsen	Brad Flower
Party	Independent	Independent
Primary vote	6,746	5,786
Percentage	22.13%	18.98%
Mayor before election
Vince Cocurullo
Independent
Elected mayor
Ken Couper
Independent
- Councillors
- 13 seats on the governing body of Whangārei District Council; 7 seats needed for a majority
Party	Seats	+/–
Independent	12	−1
ACT Local	1	+1
This lists parties that won seats. See the complete results below.
Control before	Control after
No majority	No majority

=== 2025 Whangārei mayoral election ===
2025 Whangārei mayoral election
Party	Candidate	Primary votes	%	±%	Iteration	
Party	Candidate	Primary votes	%	±%	#	Votes
Independent	Ken Couper	8,668	28.43	+11.03	4th	12,418
Independent	Vince Cocurullo^{†}	8,173	26.81	−1.37	4th	11,983
Independent	Marie Olsen	6,746	22.13	(new)	3rd	8,323
Independent	Brad Flower	5,786	18.98	+2.83	2nd	5,895
Independent	Fiona Green	708	2.32	−1.37	1st	708
Quota		15,041	49.33	n/a		
Informal votes		64	0.21	+0.06		
Blank votes		345	1.13	+0.07		
Turnout		30,490	45.50	+2.23		
Registered electors		67,004				
Independent gain from Independent on 4th iteration						
^{†} incumbent

=== Bream Bay general ward ===
2025 Bream Bay general ward election
Party	Candidate	Primary votes	%	±%	Iteration	
Party	Candidate	Primary votes	%	±%	#	Votes
ACT Local	Matthew Yovich	1,698	33.04	(new)	1st	1,698
Independent	David Baldwin	987	19.20	(new)	4th	1,472
Independent	Simon Schuster	853	16.60	(new)	4th	1,218
Independent	Paul Grace	706	13.74	(new)	2nd	779
Independent	Shilane Shirkey	469	9.12	−19.55	1st	469
Independent	Ken Couper^{†} (withdrawn, elected mayor)	n/a	n/a	n/a	1st	0
Quota		1,571	30.56	n/a		
Informal votes		58	1.13	+1.13		
Blank votes		84	1.63	−0.86		
Turnout		5,140	49.67	+0.71		
Registered electors		10,349				
ACT Local gain from Independent on 1st iteration						
Independent gain from Independent on 4th iteration						
^{†} incumbent

=== Hikurangi-Coastal general ward ===
2025 Hikurangi-Coastal general ward election
Party	Candidate	Primary votes	%	±%	Iteration	
Party	Candidate	Primary votes	%	±%	#	Votes
Independent	Scott McKenzie^{†}	1,243	29.25	−5.20	4th	1,359
Independent	Stephen Gregory Martin	956	22.50	−8.98	6th	1,260
Independent	Susy Bretherton	873	20.55	(new)	6th	1,149
Independent	Chanelle Armstrong	385	9.06	(new)	4th	506
Independent	Norma Margaret De Langen	291	6.85	(new)	3rd	318
Independent	Vicky Humphreys	231	5.44	(new)	2nd	242
Independent	Ren Haskell	143	3.37	(new)	1st	143
Quota		1,374	32.34	n/a		
Informal votes		40	0.94	+0.87		
Blank votes		87	2.05	+0.54		
Turnout		4,249	50.39	+0.59		
Registered electors		8,432				
Independent hold on 4th iteration						
Independent gain from Independent on 6th iteration						
^{†} incumbent

=== Mangakahia-Maungatapere general ward ===
2025 Mangakahia-Maungatapere general ward election
Party	Candidate	Primary votes	%	±%	Iteration	
Party	Candidate	Primary votes	%	±%	#	Votes
Independent	Simon Reid^{†}	1,476	58.09	−7.63	1st	1,476
Independent	Tim Robinson	1,003	39.47	(new)	1st	1,003
Quota		1,240	48.80	n/a		
Informal votes		4	0.16	+0.12		
Blank votes		58	2.28	−2.41		
Turnout		2,541	54.08	+3.32		
Registered electors		4,699				
Independent hold on 1st iteration						
^{†} incumbent

=== Whangārei Heads general ward ===
2025 Whangārei Heads general ward election
Party	Candidate	Primary votes	%	±%	Iteration	
Party	Candidate	Primary votes	%	±%	#	Votes
Independent	Tangiwai Baker	1,253	39.11	(new)	3rd	1,406
Independent	Spence Penney	1,076	33.58	(new)	3rd	1,288
Independent	Anthony Huon Wild	472	14.73	(new)	2nd	601
Independent	Jonathan Twyman	337	10.52	(new)	1st	337
Quota		1,569	48.97	n/a		
Informal votes		5	0.16	+0.12		
Blank votes		61	1.90	−3.25		
Turnout		3,204	60.60	+4.73		
Registered electors		5,287				
Independent gain from Independent on 3rd iteration						

=== Whangārei Urban general ward ===
2025 Whangārei Urban general ward election
Party	Candidate	Primary votes	%	±%	Iteration	
Party	Candidate	Primary votes	%	±%	#	Votes
Independent	Marie Olsen^{†}	2,076	17.67	−11.68	1st	2,076
Independent	Brad Flower	1,797	15.29	(new)	10th	1,889
Independent	Nicholas Hunter Connop^{†}	1,484	12.63	−21.30	16th	1,874
Independent	Paul Yovich^{†}	1,047	8.91	−22.58	18th	1,877
Independent	Chrichton Christie	1,182	10.06	−15.29	19th	1,412
Independent	Carol Peters^{†}	932	7.93	−24.99	19th	1,549
Independent	Jayne Golightly^{†}	609	5.18	−38.59	16th	976
Independent	Philip George Cullen	513	4.37	(new)	15th	645
Independent	Tony Dingle	449	3.82	(new)	14th	582
Independent	Tiana Epati	385	3.28	(new)	11th	502
Independent	Jesse Card	243	2.07	(new)	10th	280
Independent	Jodie Rameka	189	1.61	(new)	9th	210
Independent	Paul Gosling	151	1.28	(new)	8th	159
Independent	Julie Pepper	100	0.85	(new)	7th	117
Independent	Heath Kewene	87	0.74	(new)	6th	98
Independent	Adam Young	94	0.80	−8.79	4th	96
Independent	Gabriel Anthony Wilhelm Henry	59	0.50	(new)	2nd	60
Quota		1,900	16.17	n/a		
Informal votes		160	1.36	+0.84		
Blank votes		194	1.65	+0.42		
Turnout		11,751	42.22	+6.51		
Registered electors		27,831				
Independent hold on 1st iteration						
Independent gain from Independent on 10th iteration						
Independent hold on 16th iteration						
Independent hold on 18th iteration						
Independent gain from Independent on 19th iteration						
^{†} incumbent

=== Whangārei District Māori ward ===
2025 Whangārei District Māori ward election
Party	Candidate	Primary votes	%	±%	Iteration	
Party	Candidate	Primary votes	%	±%	#	Votes
Independent	Deb Harding^{†}	1,355	37.59	−1.44	1st	1,355
Independent	Phoenix Ruka^{†}	1,426	39.56	+1.17	1st	1,426
Independent	Sheila Taylor	711	19.72	(new)	1st	711
Quota		1,164	32.29	n/a		
Informal votes		31	0.86	+0.82		
Blank votes		82	2.27	−0.36		
Turnout		3,605	34.64	+10.82		
Registered electors		10,406				
Independent gain from Te Pāti Māori on 1st iteration						
Independent hold on 1st iteration						
^{†} incumbent

=== Referendum on Māori wards ===
Choice	Votes	%
I vote to REMOVE Māori wards	16,219	55.12
I vote to KEEP Māori wards	13,206	44.88
Total	29,425	100.00
Valid votes	29,425	96.51
Invalid votes	16	0.05
Blank votes	1,049	3.44
Total votes	30,490	100.00
Registered voters/turnout	30,490	100.00
Source: WDC & MCERT

== Kaipara District Council ==
2025 Kaipara District Council election
- 11 October 2025
- Turnout: 10,702 (58.39% ▲10.83 pp)
- Mayor
	Ind	Ind
Candidate	Jonathan Larsen	Snow Tane
Party	Independent	Independent
Popular vote	3,138	3,117
Percentage	29.32%	29.13%
	Ind	Ind
Candidate	Jason Smith	Ash Nayyar
Party	Independent	Independent
Popular vote	3,081	1,278
Percentage	28.79%	11.94%
Mayor before election
Craig Jepson
Independent
Elected mayor
Jonathan Larsen
Independent
- Councillors
- 8 seats on the governing body of Kaipara District Council; 5 seats needed for a majority
Party	Seats	+/–
Independent	8	0
This lists parties that won seats. See the complete results below.
Control before	Control after
No majority	No majority

=== 2025 Kaipara mayoral election ===
2025 Kaipara mayoral election
Party	Candidate	Votes	%	±%
Independent	Jonathan Larsen	3,138	29.32	(new)
Independent	Snow Tane	3,117	29.13	(new)
Independent	Jason Smith	3,081	28.79	(new)
Independent	Ash Nayyar	1,278	11.94	n/a
Informal votes		9	0.08	−1.01
Blank votes		79	0.74	−0.11
Turnout		10,702	58.39	+10.83
Registered electors		18,327		
Independent gain from Independent				

=== Kaiwaka-Mangawhai ward ===
2025 Kaiwaka-Mangawhai ward election
Party	Candidate	Votes	%	±%
Independent	Rachael Williams^{†}	1,985	50.42	n/a
Independent	Craig Jepson	1,704	43.28	(new)
Independent	Luke Kenneth Canton	1,669	42.39	(new)
Independent	Helen Price	1,482	37.64	(new)
Independent	Ron Berking	1,327	33.71	(new)
ACT Local	Nima Maleiki	1,073	27.25	(new)
Independent	Wiremu Paikea	767	19.48	(new)
Independent	Stephen Albert Allen	355	9.02	(new)
Informal votes		0	0.00	−1.48
Blank votes		20	0.51	−0.97
Turnout		3,937	56.34	+4.45
Registered electors		6,988		
Independent hold				
Independent gain from Independent				
Independent gain from Independent				
^{†} incumbent

=== Otamatea ward ===
2025 Otamatea ward election
Party	Candidate	Votes	%	±%
Independent	Mike Schimanski	820	36.16	(new)
Independent	Denise Anne Rogers	742	32.72	(new)
Independent	Mark Gregory Vincent^{†}	740	32.63	−25.24
Independent	Fiona Kemp	739	32.58	(new)
Independent	Stephen Wood	484	21.34	(new)
ACT Local	Roger James Billington	399	17.59	(new)
Independent	Joel Bouzaid	94	4.14	(new)
Informal votes		2	0.09	−0.66
Blank votes		45	1.98	−2.12
Turnout		2,268	56.24	+14.52
Registered electors		4,033		
Independent gain from Independent				
Independent gain from Independent				
^{†} incumbent

=== Wairoa ward ===
2025 Wairoa ward election
Party	Candidate	Votes	%	±%
Independent	Snow Tane	2,443	54.33	(new)
Independent	Joesephine Nathan	1,444	32.11	n/a
Independent	Gordon Lambeth^{†}	1,345	29.91	n/a
Independent	Jan Beatty	1,334	29.66	(new)
Independent	Pera Paniora	1,318	29.31	(new)
Independent	Ash Nayyar^{†}	1,158	25.75	n/a
Independent	Brian Douglas Jackson	851	18.92	(new)
Independent	Gordon Walker	746	16.59	(new)
Independent	Rodney Field	576	12.81	(new)
Independent	Matthew Stephen John Brajkovich	376	8.36	(new)
Independent	Neil Robert Doherty	263	5.85	(new)
Independent	Wero Te Kino	257	5.71	(new)
Independent	Kurt Richards	168	3.74	(new)
Informal votes		18	0.40	−0.54
Blank votes		15	0.33	−1.18
Turnout		4,497	61.55	+9.40
Registered electors		7,306		
Independent gain from Independent				
Independent gain from Independent				
Independent hold				
^{†} incumbent

== See also ==
- 2025 Northland Regional Council election
