= Results of the 2022 New Zealand territorial authority elections in Northland =

2022 New Zealand territorial authority elections (Northland)
- 8 October 2022
- Turnout: 56,927 (43.22% ▼2.34 pp)
- 3 of 3 local councils
Party	Councils	+/–
No majority	3	0
This lists parties that won seats. See the complete results below.
- 3 mayors and 32 local councillors
Party	Seats	+/–
Mayors
Independent	3	0
Local councillors
Independent	31	+1
Te Pāti Māori	1	+1
This lists parties that won seats. See the complete results below.

Elections for the territorial authorities of New Zealand were held from 16 September until 8 October 2022 as part of that year's nation-wide local elections. 706 local councillors and 66 mayors were elected across 66 of 67 councils.

3 territorial authorities are located within the Northland Region, being the Far North District Council, Whangārei District Council, and Kaipara District Council. 3 mayors and 32 district councillors were elected.

== Maps ==

Independent hold	Independent gain
	Te Pāti Māori gain

== Summary ==
=== Overall ===
Council	Electoral system	Seats	Mayor	Councillors	Control	Turnout	Details	Refs
Far North	STV	10	▌ Independent gain	▌ Independent 10 (▲1)	▌ No majority	19,619; 41.53% ▼5.95 pp	Details	
Whangārei	FPP	13	▌ Independent gain	▌ Independent 12 (▼1) ▌ Te Pāti Māori 1 (▲1)	▌ No majority	28,942; 43.27% ▼1.71 pp	Details	
Kaipara	STV	9	▌ Independent gain	▌ Independent 9 (▲1)	▌ No majority	8,366; 47.56% ▲4.94 pp	Details	
3 of 3 councils		32						

=== Mayors ===
Council	Incumbent	Elected	Runner-up	Details	Refs
Far North	John Carter^{R} (Ind)	Moko Tepania (Ind)	Ann Court (Ind)	Details	
Whangārei	Sheryl Mai^{R} (Ind)	Vince Cocurullo (Ind)	Mike Budd (Ind)	Details	
Kaipara	Jason Smith^{R} (Ind)	Craig Jepson (Ind)	Karen Joyce-Paki (Ind)	Details	
^{R} did not run for re-election

=== Candidates ===
Party / ticket	Mayors				Councillors			
Party / ticket	2019	Candidates	Elected	+/−	2019	Candidates	Elected	+/−
Independent	3	21	3	0	30	98	31	▲1
Te Pāti Māori	no candidates				0	1	1	▲1
Sovereign NZ	(new)	1	0	0	(new)	7	0	0
Total:	3	22	3	0	30	106	32	▲2

== Far North District Council ==
2022 Far North District Council election
- 8 October 2022
- Turnout: 19,619 (41.53% ▼5.95 pp)
- Mayor
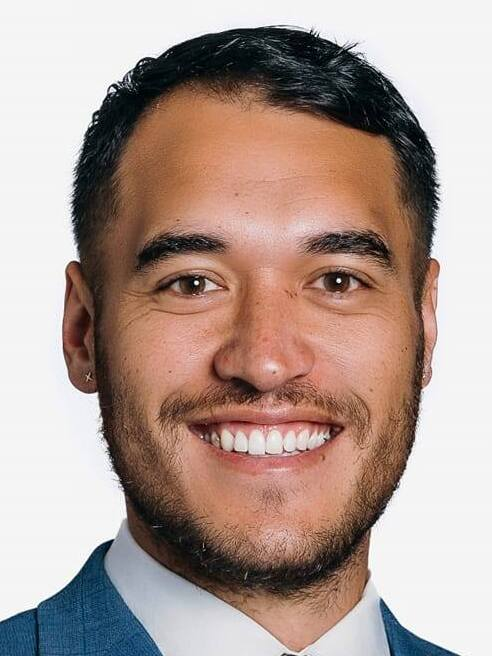
		Ind
Candidate	Moko Tepania	Ann Court
Party	Independent	Independent
Final vote	7,805	7,362
Percentage	51.46%	48.54%
Mayor before election
John Carter
Independent
Elected mayor
Moko Tepania
Independent
- Councillors
- 10 seats on the governing body of Far North District Council; 6 seats needed for a majority
Party	Seats	+/–
Independent	10	+1
This lists parties that won seats. See the complete results below.
Control before	Control after
No majority	No majority

=== 2022 Far North mayoral election ===
2022 Far North mayoral election
Party	Candidate	Primary votes	%	±%	Iteration	
Party	Candidate	Primary votes	%	±%	#	Votes
Independent	Moko Tepania	not supplied	n/a	(new)	8th	7,805
Independent	Ann Court	not supplied	n/a	(new)	8th	7,362
Independent	John Vujcich	not supplied	n/a	(new)	7th	4,166
Sovereign NZ	Joshua Riley	not supplied	n/a	(new)	6th	2,927
Independent	Jaqi Brown	not supplied	n/a	(new)	5th	1,865
Independent	Kelly Stratford	not supplied	n/a	(new)	4th	1,616
Independent	Kevin Middleton	not supplied	n/a	(new)	3rd	296
Independent	Clinton Dearlove	not supplied	n/a	(new)	2nd	276
Independent	Rachel Witana	122	0.62	(new)	1st	122
Quota		9,690	49.39	n/a		
Informal votes		102	0.52	+0.14		
Blank votes		173	0.88	−0.42		
Turnout		19,619	41.53	−5.95		
Registered electors		47,240				
Independent gain from Independent on 8th iteration						

=== Bay of Islands-Whangaroa general ward ===
2022 Bay of Islands-Whangaroa general ward election
Party	Candidate	Primary votes	%	±%	Iteration	
Party	Candidate	Primary votes	%	±%	#	Votes
Independent	Ann Court^{†}	2,995	35.38	−12.78	1st	2,995
Independent	Kelly Stratford^{†}	not supplied	n/a	n/a	17th	1,909
Independent	Steve McNally	not supplied	n/a	(new)	18th	1,711
Independent	Rachel Smith^{†}	not supplied	n/a	n/a	18th	1,580
Sovereign NZ	Robert Eady	not supplied	n/a	(new)	16th	847
Independent	Ben Warren	not supplied	n/a	(new)	15th	690
Independent	Jane Johnston	not supplied	n/a	n/a	14th	614
Sovereign NZ	Pierre Fernandes	not supplied	n/a	(new)	12th	481
Independent	Frank Owen	not supplied	n/a	n/a	10th	422
Independent	Belinda Ward	not supplied	n/a	(new)	8th	365
Independent	Richard Aston	not supplied	n/a	(new)	6th	278
Independent	Annette Main	not supplied	n/a	(new)	5th	266
Sovereign NZ	Garth Rodney Anthony Holder	not supplied	n/a	(new)	3rd	245
Quota		2,061	24.34	n/a		
Informal votes		107	1.26	+0.89		
Blank votes		162	1.91	−2.22		
Turnout		8,466	45.47	−2.57		
Registered electors		18,618				
Independent hold on 1st iteration						
Independent hold on 17th iteration						
Independent gain from Independent on 18th iteration						
^{†} incumbent

=== Kaikohe-Hokianga general ward ===
2022 Kaikohe-Hokianga general ward election
Party	Candidate	Primary votes	%	±%	Iteration	
Party	Candidate	Primary votes	%	±%	#	Votes
Independent	John Vujcich^{†}	1,543	66.19	+33.10	1st	1,543
Independent	Vanessa Edmonds	398	17.07	(new)	1st	398
Sovereign NZ	Alisha Riley	299	12.83	(new)	1st	299
Quota		1,120	48.05	n/a		
Informal votes		9	0.39	+0.04		
Blank votes		82	3.52	+2.07		
Turnout		2,331	45.99	+1.29		
Registered electors		5,069				
Independent hold on 1st iteration						
^{†} incumbent

=== Te Hiku general ward ===
2022 Te Hiku general ward election
Party	Candidate	Primary votes	%	±%	Iteration	
Party	Candidate	Primary votes	%	±%	#	Votes
Independent	Felicity Foy^{†}	1,523	34.14	−5.78	1st	1,523
Independent	Mate Radich^{†}	not supplied	n/a	n/a	9th	1,333
Independent	Adele Gardner	not supplied	n/a	(new)	9th	917
Independent	Dave Collard^{†}	not supplied	n/a	n/a	8th	702
Sovereign NZ	Joshua Riley	not supplied	n/a	(new)	6th	603
Independent	Melanie Dalziel	not supplied	n/a	(new)	4th	291
Independent	John Matthews	not supplied	n/a	(new)	3rd	240
Independent	Darren Carl Axe	not supplied	n/a	(new)	2nd	160
Sovereign NZ	Paul McLaren	74	1.66	(new)	1st	74
Quota		1,448	32.46	n/a		
Informal votes		75	1.68	+1.35		
Blank votes		66	1.48	−0.04		
Turnout		4,461	44.89	−3.58		
Registered electors		9,938				
Independent hold on 1st iteration						
Independent hold on 9th iteration						
^{†} incumbent

=== Ngā Tai o Tokerau Māori ward ===
2022 Ngā Tai o Tokerau Māori ward election
Party	Candidate	Primary votes	%	±%	Iteration	
Party	Candidate	Primary votes	%	±%	#	Votes
Independent	Hilda Halkyard-Harawira	976	22.38	n/a	1st	976
Independent	Tāmati Rākena	not supplied	n/a	n/a	8th	704
Independent	Penetaui Kleskovic	not supplied	n/a	n/a	23rd	607
Independent	Babe Kapa	not supplied	n/a	n/a	29th	530
Independent	Mina Paula Pomare-Peita	not supplied	n/a	n/a	29th	513
Independent	Nyze Manuel	not supplied	n/a	n/a	23rd	353
Independent	Clinton Dearlove	not supplied	n/a	n/a	21st	304
Independent	Rhonda Zielinski-Toki	not supplied	n/a	n/a	18th	264
Independent	Pania Sigley	not supplied	n/a	n/a	15th	187
Independent	Sam Napia	not supplied	n/a	n/a	14th	164
Independent	Ruth Heta	not supplied	n/a	n/a	11th	130
Independent	Rachel Witana	not supplied	n/a	n/a	9th	103
Independent	Manuera Moko Riwai	not supplied	n/a	n/a	7th	89
Sovereign NZ	Diane Rodgers	not supplied	n/a	n/a	6th	66
Independent	Reina Tuai Penney	not supplied	n/a	n/a	5th	66
Independent	Tarei Patuwairua	not supplied	n/a	n/a	3rd	58
Independent	Boyd Hohepa	not supplied	n/a	n/a	2nd	39
Independent	Moko Tepania (withdrawn, elected mayor)	0	0.00	n/a	1st	0
Quota		719	16.49	n/a		
Informal votes		636	14.58	n/a		
Blank votes		76	1.74	n/a		
Turnout		4,361	32.03	n/a		
Registered electors		13,615				
Independent win (new seat) on 1st iteration						
Independent win (new seat) on 8th iteration						
Independent win (new seat) on 23rd iteration						
Independent win (new seat) on 29th iteration						

== Whangārei District Council ==
2022 Whangārei District Council election
- 8 October 2022
- Turnout: 28,942 (43.27% ▼1.71 pp)
- Mayor
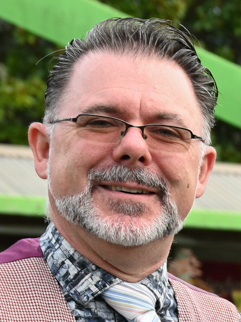

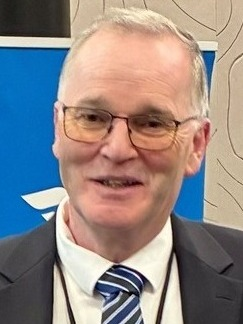
		Ind
Candidate	Vince Cocurullo	Mike Budd	Ken Couper
Party	Independent	Independent	Independent
Popular vote	8,157	5,814	5,037
Percentage	28.18%	20.09%	17.40%
	Ind	Ind	Ind
Candidate	Brad Flower	Shaquille Shortland	Nick Jacob
Party	Independent	Independent	Independent
Popular vote	4,675	2,180	1,660
Percentage	16.15%	7.53%	5.74%
Mayor before election
Vince Cocurullo
Independent
Elected mayor
Ken Couper
Independent
- Councillors
- 13 seats on the governing body of Whangārei District Council; 7 seats needed for a majority
Party	Seats	+/–
Independent	12	−1
Te Pāti Māori	1	+1
This lists parties that won seats. See the complete results below.
Control before	Control after
No majority	No majority

=== 2022 Whangārei mayoral election ===
2022 Whangārei mayoral election
Party	Candidate	Votes	%	±%
Independent	Vince Cocurullo	8,157	28.18	(new)
Independent	Mike Budd	5,814	20.09	(new)
Independent	Ken Couper	5,037	17.40	(new)
Independent	Brad Flower	4,675	16.15	(new)
Independent	Shaquille Shortland	2,180	7.53	(new)
Independent	Nick Jacob	1,660	5.74	(new)
Independent	Fiona Green	1,068	3.69	(new)
Informal votes		43	0.15	+0.10
Blank votes		308	1.06	−0.72
Turnout		28,942	43.27	−1.71
Registered electors		66,894		
Independent gain from Independent				

=== Bream Bay general ward ===
2022 Bream Bay general ward election
Party	Candidate	Votes	%	±%
Independent	Ken Couper^{†}	2,439	49.45	+4.63
Independent	Phil Halse	2,320	47.04	(new)
Independent	Steve Bean	2,063	41.83	(new)
Independent	Shilane Shirkey	1,414	28.67	(new)
Informal votes		0	0.00	−0.13
Blank votes		123	2.49	+0.56
Turnout		4,932	48.96	+0.57
Registered electors		10,073		
Independent hold				
Independent gain from Independent				
^{†} incumbent

=== Hikurangi-Coastal general ward ===
2022 Hikurangi-Coastal general ward election
Party	Candidate	Votes	%	±%
Independent	Gavin Benney	1,703	40.71	(new)
Independent	Scott McKenzie	1,441	34.45	(new)
Independent	Greg Martin^{†}	1,317	31.48	−14.69
Independent	Tracey Thomasson	1,223	29.24	(new)
Independent	Brad Flower	1,172	28.02	(new)
Independent	Greg Jeeves	373	8.92	(new)
Informal votes		3	0.07	−0.17
Blank votes		63	1.51	−0.58
Turnout		4,183	49.80	+1.35
Registered electors		8,399		
Independent gain from Independent				
Independent gain from Independent				
^{†} incumbent

=== Mangakahia-Maungatapere general ward ===
2022 Mangakahia-Maungatapere general ward election
Party	Candidate	Votes	%	±%
Independent	Simon John Reid^{†}	1,557	65.72	+11.25
Independent	Iain James Robertson	700	29.55	(new)
Informal votes		1	0.04	+0.04
Blank votes		111	4.69	−1.83
Turnout		2,369	50.76	+0.00
Registered electors		4,667		
Independent hold				
^{†} incumbent

=== Whangārei Heads general ward ===
2022 Whangārei Heads general ward election
Party	Candidate	Votes	%	±%
Independent	Patrick Holmes	1,851	61.76	(new)
Independent	David Blackley	1,023	34.13	+7.20
Informal votes		1	0.03	+0.00
Blank votes		122	4.07	−0.49
Turnout		2,997	55.87	−0.48
Registered electors		5,364		
Independent gain from Independent				

=== Whangārei Urban general ward ===
2022 Whangārei Urban general ward election
Party	Candidate	Votes	%	±%
Independent	Vince Cocurullo (withdrawn, elected mayor)	6,114	50.34	(new)
Independent	Jayne Golightly	5,316	43.77	(new)
Independent	Nicholas Hunter Connop	4,121	33.93	(new)
Independent	Carol Peters	3,998	32.92	(new)
Independent	Paul Yovich	3,824	31.49	(new)
Independent	Marie Olsen	3,564	29.35	(new)
Independent	Chrichton Christie	3,079	25.35	(new)
Independent	Alan Brown	2,945	24.25	(new)
Independent	Isopo Samu	2,707	22.29	(new)
Independent	Paul Doherty	2,426	19.98	(new)
Independent	Shaquille Shortland	2,255	18.57	(new)
Independent	Fiona Green	2,192	18.05	(new)
Independent	Gareme Gallagher	2,149	17.69	(new)
Independent	Stephen Wood	2,034	16.75	(new)
Independent	Adam Young	1,165	9.59	(new)
Independent	Ren Haskell	1,119	9.21	(new)
Independent	Glen McMillan	1,003	8.26	(new)
Independent	Jesse Titford	822	6.77	(new)
Independent	Hazely Windleborn	579	4.77	(new)
Informal votes		63	0.52	n/a
Blank votes		149	1.23	n/a
Turnout		12,145	35.71	n/a
Registered electors		34,012		
Independent win (new seat)				
Independent win (new seat)				
Independent win (new seat)				
Independent win (new seat)				
Independent win (new seat)				

=== Whangārei District Māori ward ===
2022 Whangārei District Māori ward election
Party	Candidate	Votes	%	±%
Independent	Deb Harding	904	39.03	(new)
Te Pāti Māori	Phoenix Ruka	889	38.39	(new)
Independent	Nicki Wakefield	703	30.35	(new)
Independent	Pauline Hopa	694	29.97	(new)
Independent	Simon Mitchell	513	22.15	(new)
Independent	Zhairn Zee Tana	266	11.49	(new)
Informal votes		1	0.04	n/a
Blank votes		61	2.63	n/a
Turnout		2,316	23.82	n/a
Registered electors		9,721		
Independent win (new seat)				
Te Pati Māori win (new seat)				

== Kaipara District Council ==
2022 Kaipara District Council election
- 8 October 2022
- Turnout: 8,366 (47.56% ▲4.94 pp)
- Mayor
	Ind	Ind
Candidate	Craig Jepson	Karen Joyce-Paki
Party	Independent	Independent
Final vote	4,228	2,636
Percentage	61.60%	38.40%
Mayor before election
Jason Smith
Independent
Elected mayor
Craig Jepson
Independent
- Councillors
- 9 seats on the governing body of Kaipara District Council; 6 seats needed for a majority
Party	Seats	+/–
Independent	9	+1
This lists parties that won seats. See the complete results below.
Control before	Control after
No majority	No majority

=== 2022 Kaipara mayoral election ===
2022 Kaipara mayoral election
Party	Candidate	Primary votes	%	±%	Iteration	
Party	Candidate	Primary votes	%	±%	#	Votes
Independent	Craig Eldon Jepson	not supplied	n/a	(new)	5th	4,228
Independent	Karen Joyce-Paki	not supplied	n/a	(new)	5th	2,636
Independent	Ash Nayyar	not supplied	n/a	(new)	4th	1,813
Independent	Victoria Del La Varis-Woodcock	not supplied	n/a	(new)	3rd	1,020
Independent	Gordon Walker	not supplied	n/a	(new)	2nd	609
Independent	Brenden Nathan	450	5.38	(new)	1st	450
Quota		4,137	49.45	+1.85		
Informal votes		31	0.37	+0.12		
Blank votes		71	0.85	−3.69		
Turnout		8,366	47.56	+4.94		
Registered electors		17,589				
Independent gain from Independent on 5th iteration						

=== Kaiwaka-Mangawhai general ward ===
2022 Kaiwaka-Mangawhai general ward election
Party	Candidate	Primary votes	%	±%	Iteration	
Party	Candidate	Primary votes	%	±%	#	Votes
Independent	Jonathan Graeme Larsen^{†}	1,293	40.58	n/a	1st	1,293
Independent	Rachael Williams	not supplied	n/a	(new)	4th	768
Independent	Mike Howard	not supplied	n/a	(new)	8th	775
Independent	Misty Sansom	not supplied	n/a	(new)	8th	502
Independent	Mike Ferguson	not supplied	n/a	(new)	7th	422
Independent	Dennis Emsley	not supplied	n/a	(new)	3rd	190
Independent	Martina Tschirky	not supplied	n/a	(new)	2nd	160
Quota		776	24.36	n/a		
Informal votes		47	1.48	n/a		
Blank votes		47	1.48	n/a		
Turnout		3,186	51.89	n/a		
Registered electors		6,140				
Independent hold on 1st iteration						
Independent gain from Independent on 4th iteration						
Independent gain from Independent on 8th iteration						
^{†} incumbent

=== Otamatea general ward ===
2022 Otamatea general ward election
Party	Candidate	Primary votes	%	±%	Iteration	
Party	Candidate	Primary votes	%	±%	#	Votes
Independent	Mark Gregory Vincent^{†}	846	57.87	n/a	1st	846
Independent	Ron Manderson	not supplied	n/a	(new)	3rd	471
Independent	Chris Worzel Sellars	not supplied	n/a	(new)	3rd	292
Independent	Graham Allott	not supplied	n/a	(new)	2nd	144
Quota		464	31.74	+24.27		
Informal votes		11	0.75	+0.53		
Blank votes		60	4.10	+3.49		
Turnout		1,462	41.72	−1.72		
Registered electors		3,504				
Independent hold on 1st iteration						
Independent gain from Independent on 3rd iteration						
^{†} incumbent

=== Wairoa general ward ===
2022 Wairoa general ward election
Party	Candidate	Primary votes	%	±%	Iteration	
Party	Candidate	Primary votes	%	±%	#	Votes
Independent	Gordon Lambeth	not supplied	n/a	(new)	4th	823
Independent	Ash Nayyar	not supplied	n/a	(new)	5th	843
Independent	Eryn Wilson-Collins	not supplied	n/a	(new)	7th	736
Independent	Karen Joyce-Paki	not supplied	n/a	(new)	7th	662
Independent	Mark Gregory Ancrum	not supplied	n/a	(new)	5th	398
Independent	Alec Melville	not supplied	n/a	(new)	3rd	301
Independent	Joesephine Nathan	not supplied	n/a	(new)	2nd	122
Independent	Jay Tane	52	1.63	(new)	1st	52
Quota		778	24.44	n/a		
Informal votes		30	0.94	n/a		
Blank votes		48	1.51	n/a		
Turnout		3,183	52.15	n/a		
Registered electors		6,104				
Independent win (new seat) on 4th iteration						
Independent win (new seat) on 5th iteration						
Independent win (new seat) on 7th iteration						

=== Te Moananui o Kaipara Māori ward ===
2022 Te Moananui o Kaipara Māori ward election
Party	Candidate	Primary votes	%	±%	Iteration	
Party	Candidate	Primary votes	%	±%	#	Votes
Independent	Pera Paniora	not supplied	n/a	(new)	4th	246
Independent	Brenden Nathan	not supplied	n/a	(new)	4th	215
Independent	Henry Anthony Holyoake	not supplied	n/a	(new)	3rd	111
Independent	Paturiri Toautu	not supplied	n/a	(new)	2nd	25
Independent	Phillip Johnson	24	0.75	(new)	1st	24
Quota		257	8.07	n/a		
Informal votes		2	0.06	n/a		
Blank votes		19	0.60	n/a		
Turnout		3,186	51.89	n/a		
Registered electors		6,140				
Independent win (new seat) on 4th iteration						

== See also ==
- Results of the 2022 New Zealand regional council elections#Northland Regional Council
