= Local Government New Zealand =

Association for councils in New Zealand

Logo of Local Government New Zealand.

Local Government New Zealand Te Kahui Kaunihera ō Aotearoa (LGNZ) is the local government association of New Zealand. It represents the interests of some regional, city, and district councils in New Zealand. As of July 2015, around 47% of ratepayers lived under LGNZ member councils.

== History ==
The Association was formed in 1988 when, confronted with pending local government reform, the Municipal Association and the Counties Association agreed to merge into a single local government association. Two years later, in 1990, the New Zealand Regional Government Association (representing the nation's regional councils) agreed to join. In 1996 the amalgamated association adopted the brand name Local Government New Zealand (LGNZ).

On 23 March 2023, the Auckland Council voted by a margin of ten to ten to leave LGNZ. Mayor of Auckland Wayne Brown used his casting vote to break the deadlock during the Council's vote. In justifying the Council's decision to withdraw from LGNZ, Brown claimed that members of the body got drunk regularly during conference meetings and that the Auckland Council could negotiate with the New Zealand Government on its own. Brown also claimed that exiting the LGNZ would save the Auckland Council NZ$640,000 a year, helping to reduce its debt. The Auckland Council's decision to leave LGNZ was criticised as detrimental to Auckland ratepayers by fellow councillors Richard Hills, Andy Baker, Julie Fairey, and LGNZ President Stuart Crosby.

On 10 May 2023, the West Coast Regional Council voted to leave LGNZ, citing what it regarded as the exorbitant NZ$41,828 annual membership fee.

In late May 2023, the Kaipara District Council voted by margin of six to four to withdraw from Local Government NZ. The motion was led by Mayor of Kaipara Craig Jepson, who claimed that the LGNZ tended to represent government views to councils rather than councils' views to the government.

On 15 May 2024, the Grey District Council announced that it would be withdrawing from Local Government NZ, with Mayor of Grey Tania Gibson citing disagreement with the representative body's support for the previous Sixth Labour Government's Three Waters reform programme.

On 19 June 2024, the Christchurch City Council announced it would be withdrawing from Local Government NZ after the association raised its annual membership costs by more than NZ$20,000.

On 20 March 2025, the Western Bay of Plenty District Council voted to leave Local Government NZ by a margin of six to five. Councillors Tracey Coxhead and Margaret Murray-Beng cited a lack of professionalism, and opposition to LGNZ's climate change policies and alleged left wing bias. By March 2025, seven councils including the Auckland, Kaipara District, Christchurch City, the West Coast Regional, Grey District, Westland District and Western Bay of Plenty District councils had voted to leave LGNZ.

== About ==
Local Government New Zealand carries out a range of functions. It advocates for local democracy and promotes best practice in governance and delivery of local government services. Local government in New Zealand own 90% of the road network, most of the country's water and waste water networks, as well as recreation and community facilities such as parks, sportsgrounds and libraries. Local Government New Zealand also carries out policy work and interacts with areas such as the Resource Management Act. It conducts its policy work through a number of established committees; an economic development committee; a community issues committee; an environmental committee and an infrastructure and transport committee.

Local Government New Zealand is an incorporated society. Membership is voluntary and open to all territorial local authorities (cities and districts) and regional councils. 70 of 78 local authorities are currently members after Timaru District Council left the body in September 2021 followed by Auckland, West Coast, Kaipara, Grey, Christchurch City, Westland, Westland Bay of Plenty and Waikato Regional Council. Policy and strategic direction is set by the National Council, a body elected by local authorities through a series of electoral colleges to ensure it is representative of the different types of councils as well as having representation from both North and South Islands. There are six geographical zones, which elect representatives to the National Council and meet regularly, as well as four sector groups, metropolitan, provincial, rural and regional, which also elect members to the National Council and meet regularly to discuss and provide feedback on policy issues.

The National Council consists of 15 mayors, senior councillors and regional council chairs, including a directly elected president. Members serve a term of three years and elections are held immediately after the triennial local authority elections. There is a Māori Advisory Committee, Te Maruata (consisting of Māori elected members) and the Community Board Executive Committee (representing community boards, sub-municipal elected bodies found in just over half the cities and districts). The National Council employs a chief executive who operates a secretariat which advises the National Council; prepares submissions on relevant legislation and regulations; promotes good practice; leads strategic communication and provides a professional development program for elected members. Funding is primarily drawn from annual subscriptions.

Local Government New Zealand has a single office located in the capital, Wellington. Since the beginning of 2010, regular Central Government Local Government Forums have been held. These meetings are between the National Council of Local Government New Zealand and relevant members of Cabinet. Scheduled for a half day once a year, they are jointly chaired by the Prime Minister and the president of Local Government New Zealand. Agendas deal with current issues of joint concern and future directions.

In its policy work the key messages promoted by Local Government New Zealand are:

- Local autonomy: councils should have sufficient autonomy to respond to community needs and preferences.
- Local difference: One size does not fit all. New Zealand is a diverse country with differing local and regional needs, priorities and values, consequently as many decisions as efficiently possible should be made at the sub-national level.
- Local regulations: more recognition needs to be given by governments to the cumulative impacts of regulation, especially the fiscal cost of implementation on councils and their citizens. This can be achieved by involving local government more directly when regulations are in the development phase.
- Local funding: the current range of funding options for local government is too restricted and councils need additional funding tools.
- Local infrastructure: local government's role as the provider of local and regional infrastructure needs to be given greater recognition and acknowledgement when national infrastructural planning is undertaken.
- Local democracy: local government provides citizens and groups of citizens with choices over the ways their different needs are met and is accountable to these citizens through open and transparent processes.
- Local partnerships: local government has the potential to break down government silos and facilitate a more seamless, place based and whole of government response to pressing local and regional issues.

== LGNZ Excellence Awards ==
LGNZ Excellence Awards are annual awards starting from 2014 that to recognise local government projects within communities. In 2014 LGNZ President Lawrence Yule said, “These awards give national recognition to the strong impact projects driven by local authorities can have through community, infrastructure and economic development.”

There are four categories: Environmental Well-being, Economic Well-being, Social Well-being and Cultural Well-being with local authorities submitting award applications. In 2021, the awards were judged by Dame Kerry Prendergast, diplomat Sir Maarten Wevers, and think tank director Dr. Oliver Hartwich.

== Views and positions ==
=== Māori wards and constituencies ===
LGNZ has opposed holding referendums on Māori wards and constituencies. In May 2024, LGNZ President and Mayor of Selwyn Sam Broughton along with 53 other mayors and regional council chairs including Mayor of Palmerston North Grant Smith, Mayor of Central Otago Tim Cadogan, Mayor of Wellington Tory Whanau and Mayor of Dunedin Jules Radich issued a joint letter describing the Sixth National Government's proposed law requiring local councils to hold referendums on having Māori wards and constituencies as "an overreach on local decision-making." In response, the Local Government Minister Simeon Brown along with New Zealand First leader Winston Peters and ACT Party David Seymour defended the proposed legislation as a restoration of democracy and said that New Zealanders had voted for change during the 2023 New Zealand general election.

=== Extending terms ===
In February 2025, LGNZ voiced support for extending both the local government and parliamentary term from three to four years. LGNZ's President Broughton said that a four-year term would "end up with a whole lot less waste and wasted time and public money in the system, and means that we can have some long-term thinking - particularly when it involves infrastructure planning and investment."

== See also ==
- Local Government Commission
- Territorial authorities of New Zealand
