= Meng Foon =

New Zealand politician (born 1959)

- 廖振明
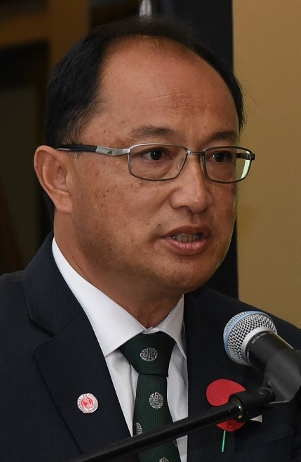
- Foon in 2016

11th Race Relations Commissioner
- In office 26 August 2019 – 16 June 2023
- Monarchs: Elizabeth II; Charles III
- Prime Minister: Jacinda Ardern; Chris Hipkins
- Preceded by: Susan Devoy
- Succeeded by: Melissa Derby

23rd Mayor of Gisborne
- In office October 2001 – 22 August 2019
- Preceded by: John Clarke
- Succeeded by: Rehette Stoltz

Personal details
- Born: August 1959 (age 67) Gisborne, New Zealand

Meng Liu Foon (Note: Chinese: 廖振明; Cantonese Yale: Liuh Jan-mìhng.) (born August 1959) is a New Zealand politician who served as the mayor of Gisborne from 2001 to 2019. He served as New Zealand's race relations commissioner from August 2019 to June 2023, resigning after failing to declare payments of $2 million he took for emergency housing while director of an investment company. He is one of a handful of people of Chinese descent to have become a mayor in New Zealand. He is fluent in English, Cantonese and Māori. At the time of his departure from the mayoral position he was the only mayor in New Zealand who was fluent in Māori.

== Childhood and education ==
Meng Foon was born in August 1959 in Gisborne in New Zealand's North Island. His mother is Ng Heng Kiu (Helen) of Hong Kong and his father is Liu Sui Kai (George) of Guangzhou. Foon's parents were market gardeners who operated a vegetable shop in Gisborne. Foon also has a brother.

From the age of seven, Foon began working at his family's vegetable shop. Foon and his younger brother attended school while working in the morning, lunch break, and after school at the family business. While working at his family business, Foon developed an interest in languages and accents; eventually becoming fluent in English, Cantonese, and the Māori language.

== Education ==
Foon attended Makaraka School where he was exposed to Māori culture including flax making and the haka war dance. Foon later attended Gisborne Intermediate School and Gisborne Boys' High School. Foon studied English, social studies, the sciences, physical education and the Māori language at Gisborne Boys' High School. Foon also played rugby at High School. Foon left high school at Sixth Form to help run his family's market garden business.

== Business career ==
Foon expanded his family's market garden business into several shops. During the 1960s, Foon and his family also bought Gisborne's Kaiti Mall and opened a liquor shop called TAB. In 1985, Foon's parents retired and emigrated to Sydney, Australia before retiring in Hong Kong. Meng, his brother, and their wives subsequently took over the family business.

In 2018, Foon and his relatives sold Kaiti Mall. By that time, Kaiti Mall's land and buildings were estimated to be worth NZ$3.8 million. By 2018, Kaiti Mall had 12 tenants including businesses, government, and commercial tenants. Foon is an independent director of PGG Wrightson.

== Local government career ==
In 1995, Foon stood as councillor for the Gisborne District Council's Patutahi Taruheru ward at the encouragement of two detectives. At the time, the incumbent councillor Owen Pinching had announced his retirement. Foon won the 1995 local election and was elected to the Patutahi Taruheru ward.

In 1998, Foon unsuccessfully ran for the position of Mayor of Gisborne. In 2001, Foon ran again for the Gisborne mayoralty and was successfully elected. During the mayoral campaign, he highlighted his family values, business acumen, Māori language fluency, and financial management skills. He was the first person to serve five consecutive terms as Gisborne mayor since Harry Barker retired in 1977. In 2016, Foon won his sixth consecutive term as mayor of the Gisborne District, defeating three other candidates. His mayoralty extended across New Zealand's easternmost province with the largest proportion of native Maori population (45% according to the 2013 New Zealand census).

Following confirmation of the Ngāti Porou deal, arranged under the controversial Foreshore and Seabed Act 2004, Foon was quoted as saying that "he did not believe many people would be disadvantaged by reduced access to the beach, as 90 per cent of the East Coast population was Maori anyway." Foon announced in March 2019 that he would not stand again in the 2019 local elections.

On 8 August 2019, the Gisborne District Council voted unanimously to appoint the deputy mayor, Rehette Stoltz, as mayor when Foon formally resigned on 22 August 2019.

== Race relations commissioner ==
In July 2019, Justice Minister Andrew Little confirmed that Foon had been appointed as the new Race Relations Commissioner, with his term commencing on 26 August 2019.

In December 2019, Foon criticised the cartoonist Garrick Tremain's cartoon in the Otago Daily Times which made light of the measles epidemic in Samoa, calling it a "slap in the face" for the victims' families.

In August 2020, Foon rebuked West Coast District councillor Alan Birchfield for referring to the COVID-19 as the "Chinese virus". In response, Birchfield denied he was racist, stating "we all know where it started." Mayor of Buller Jamie Cleine and Mayor of Grey Tania Gibson distanced themselves from Birchfield's remarks.

In early November 2020, Foon as Race Relations Commissioner defended Foreign Minister Nanaia Mahuta's kauae moko facial tattoos after right-wing blogger Olivier Pierson mocked them as the "height of ugly, uncivilised wokedom." Foon stated that Mahuta's kauae moko was special to Māori and should be celebrated. He also urged people to abandon their racism and prejudices and to accept that the world is changing and that the Māori economy is growing.

In March 2021, Meng Foon added his voice to those calling for an end to the reality show Police Ten 7 - which sparked controversy. Meng Foon later withdrew his statement.

In response to reports of bullying, intimidation, and vandalism targeting Russian New Zealanders in March 2022, Foon stated that Ukrainians and Russians living in New Zealand were "feeling the pain of what's happening with the war in Ukraine" and urged different communities "to be considerate, to be respectful and to be kind."

In late November 2022, Foon criticised the recently elected mayor of Kaipara Craig Jepson for interrupting Māori ward councillor Pera Paniora's karakia (Māori prayer). He stated that it was very important for councils and all organisations to create the right space for Māori to honour the Treaty of Waitangi and to express their culture and language. In response to a petition and hīkoi (protest march) calling for Jepson's resignation, Jepson defended his decision to ban karakia from council proceedings and accused Foon and Local Government Minister Nanaia Mahuta of interfering in local affairs.

In March 2023, Foon called on Mayor of Invercargill Nobby Clark to apologise after the latter made a series of racial, profane, and violent words and phrases during an Art Foundation New Zealand event in Invercargill in order to draw attention to limits on free speech and profanity. Clark responded by calling for Foon to resign as Race Relations Commissioner for not investigating poet Tusiata Avia for making alleged hate speech in a poem criticising British explorer Captain James Cook.

While not openly associated with any political party, Foon and his wife Ying Foon acknowledged making donations to both the Labour and the National parties in April 2023, stating that it was a family tradition to donate to parties both left and right. The Foons donated NZ$1,500 to Labour MP Kiri Allan during the 2020 New Zealand general election while their company Triple Eight Investments Limited provided Allan with a rent subsidy of NZ$9185. In addition, Foon donated NZ$1,000 to National's East Coast candidate Tania Tapsell during the 2020 general election. In response, ACT Party leader David Seymour and National's justice spokesperson Paul Goldsmith called on Foon to resign as Race Relations Commissioner due to the apolitical and independent nature of the position. Goldsmith also called on Allan to declare a conflict of interest to the Cabinet Office. Prime Minister Chris Hipkins responded that Allan had taken steps to address the matter but described Foon's political donations to both Labour and National as a "balanced approach to supporting various candidates regardless of their party affiliation." In response to media coverage, the Human Rights Commission confirmed that it would be "carefully assessing" media reports of Foon's political donations.

On 16 June 2023, Foon resigned as Race Relations Commissioner after failing to declare several conflicts of interest as required under the Crown Entities Act. Foon served as the director of an emergency housing company that had received income from government payments including over NZ$2 million in emergency accommodation funding. Foon's resignation followed an internal inquiry that the Human Rights Commission had conducted into Foon's interests including emergency accommodation funding. Foon disputed that he had failed to declare his conflict of interest regarding the emergency accommodation funding and claimed that he had declared these interests prior to assuming his role as Race Relations Commissioner. The Human Rights Commission disputed Foon's account and stated that Foon had only registered this additional income in late April 2023.

On 19 June, Foon accused the prime minister's office of leaking news about his planned resignation and indicated that he was reconsidering his decision to resign as race relations commissioner. On 20 June, Foon accepted his resignation as race relations commissioner and indicated that he still wanted to contribute to the Gisborne/Tairāwhiti community.

== Personal life and family ==
Foon has several interests outside of politics. He has released a musical number, Tu Mai, which includes various native tracks, he has been chair of Gisborne/Tarawhiti Rugby League since 2007, and is a board member of the New Zealand Rugby League board.

At the age of 21, Foon married his wife Ying, who was 20 years old at the time. The couple have two daughters and a son.

== See also ==
- Peter Chin, Mayor of Dunedin
