= ACT Local =

- Party Leader: David Seymour
- Local government spokesperson: Cameron Luxton
- Founded: 2025; 1 year ago
- Ideology: Classical liberalism; Right-libertarianism; Conservatism
- Political position: Right-wing
- Colours: Magenta; Cyan; Yellow
- Slogan: Real change. Lower Rates
- Regional councillors: 2 / 132
- Local councillors: 6 / 718
- Auckland local board members: 1 / 149

Website
- actlocal.nz

ACT Local is the local government division of ACT New Zealand. The party announced it would run local candidates for the first time at the 2025 local elections. The party campaigned on limiting rates, opposing local council climate action, opposing the "war" on cars, and opposing co-governance. They supported the anti-Māori ward position in the nation-wide local referendums on the issue.

== Background ==
The party had not put forward local government candidates prior to 2025. Party leader David Seymour told TVNZ's Breakfast that the party had "strong" values related to "saving money, letting people be free to choose and treating people equally". The party was the first national-level right wing party to contest local elections, something typically only the left wing parties had done.

Seymour told the New Zealand Herald that the campaign was "exploratory", saying that better representation was needed on local councils. He said that in 2023 that the country had voted for change but that local councils had not "got the memo" and that it was time for a "clean-out".

== Positions and platform ==
=== Rates ===
ACT local government spokesperson Cameron Luxton criticised rising rates across the country; he said "Councillors will be standing for cutting waste, reducing rates, and keeping councils focused on their knitting, because that is the problem New Zealanders are facing". Seymour said that the party would be for less "waste" with regards to local council spending, saying that ratepayers were "fed up" with previous councillors that had made promises they had not delivered on. He was "frustrated" at the "inefficiencies" in local councils.

=== Climate change ===
The party announced that their candidates would oppose climate action by local councils. This included opposing funding for emission reductions, disregarding missions from council land use consents, opposing emissions reduction plans, opposing climate emergency declarations, opposing ratepayer-funded climate junkets, and a focus on storm water infrastructure and stop banks. Luxton said the focus on climate action was a cause of massive rates increases.

=== Public transportation ===
Seymour said that the party would oppose efforts "[to get] people out of their cars". He said that councils had been "waging war" on drivers and that ACT candidates would support more choice in transport. He pointed to cycleways and speedbumps as part of this alleged war.

=== Co-governance ===
The party would support getting rid of the "racial discrimination" that had "crept" into council politics, opposing co-governance and Māori wards.

== Campaign ==
=== Fundraising ===
Candidates would be expected to fund their own campaigns, according to Seymour.

== Analysis ==
Joel MacManus of The Spinoff said that the party's "core" principles would translate easily to local politics; these principles included cutting spending, reducing rates, ending Māori wards, and ending co-governance. MacManus suggested it could be a good thing as voters often find it hard to know where every local candidate stands, and that an ACT endorsement would be a "simple signifier" of someone's values.

Julienne Molineaux, a senior social sciences lecturer at Auckland University of Technology, noted a tension between clear policy positions put out by the party and the requirements under the Local Government Act for councillors to make decisions with an open mind and to avoid predetermined positions.

== Lists of candidates ==
=== 2025 ===
Radio New Zealand reported on 13 June that the party had finalised its candidate selection. The party was not considering mayoral or Māori ward candidates. Seymour said the party was in discussions with sitting councillors, and he claimed that over 300 people had indicated an interest in running. The party began announcing candidates several weeks later.

ACT announced 46 candidates (37 running for local or regional councils, and 9 running exclusively for local boards in Auckland) across 24 councils.

According to provisional results released on 12 October, nine of the 46 ACT Local candidates (roughly 20%) were elected into local government positions.

2025 candidates
Council	Position	Candidate	Result	Details	Notes
Far North District Council	Bay of Islands-Whangaroa ward councillor	Davina Smolders	Elected		
Whangarei District Council	Bream Bay ward councillor	Matthew Yovich	Elected	Details	
Kaipara District Council	Otamatea ward councillor	Roger Billington	Not elected		
Kaipara District Council	Kaiwaka-Mangawhai ward councillor	Nima Maleiki	Not elected		
Auckland Council	Albany ward councillor	Samuel Mills	Not elected	Details	
Auckland Council	Hibiscus and Bays local board member	Samuel Mills	Not elected	Details	
Auckland Council	North Shore ward councillor	Helena Roza	Not elected	Details	
Auckland Council	Devonport-Takapuna local board member	Helena Roza	Not elected	Details	
Auckland Council	Howick ward councillor	Ali Dahche	Not elected	Details	
Auckland Council	Howick local board member	Ali Dahche	Not elected	Details	
Auckland Council	Manukau ward councillor	Henrietta Devoe	Not elected	Details	
Auckland Council	Ōtara-Papatoetoe local board member	Henrietta Devoe	Not elected	Details	
Auckland Council	Franklin ward councillor	Dene Green	Not elected	Details	
Auckland Council	Franklin local board member	Dene Green	Not elected	Details	
Auckland Council	Papakura local board member	Prasad Gawande	Not elected	Details	
Auckland Council	Kaipātiki local board member	Martin Lundqvist	Not elected	Details	
Auckland Council	Henderson-Massey local board member	Ben Cox	Not elected	Details	
Auckland Council	Hibiscus and Bays local board member	Yang Kang Hong Qu	Not elected	Details	
Auckland Council	Howick local board member	Pat Arroyo	Not elected	Details	
Auckland Council	Howick local board member	William Goldberg	Not elected	Details	
Auckland Council	Ōrākei local board member	Martin Mahler	Not elected	Details	
Auckland Council	Ōrākei local board member	Amanda Lockyer	Elected	Details	
Auckland Council	Ōrākei local board member	Robert Meredith	Not elected	Details	
Hauraki District Council	Paeroa ward councillor	Michelle Magnus	Not elected	Details	
Hauraki District Council	Plains ward councillor	Andrew Pickford	Not elected	Details	
Waikato District Council	Tamahere–Woodlands ward councillor	Peter Mayall	Not elected		
Hamilton City Council	Western ward councillor	Nidhita Gosai	Not elected	Details	
Hamilton City Council	Eastern ward councillor	Preet Dhaliwal	Not elected	Details	
Waipā District Council	Cambridge ward councillor	Stuart Hylton	Not elected		
Napier City Council	Ahuriri ward councillor	Iain Bradley	Not elected	Details	
New Plymouth District Council	Kaitake-Ngāmotu ward councillor	Damon Fox	Elected	Details	
Manawatū District Council	Feilding ward councillor	Aaron McLeod	Not elected		
Manawatū District Council	Feilding ward councillor	Jerry Pickford	Elected		
Palmerston North City Council	Te Hirawanui general ward councillor	Glen Williams	Not elected	Details	
Greater Wellington Regional Council	Te Awa Kairangi ki Tai/Lower Hutt constituency councillor	Nigel Elder	Elected	Details	
Greater Wellington Regional Council	Pōneke/Wellington constituency councillor	Alice Claire Hurdle	Not elected	Details	
Porirua City Council	Pāuatahanui ward councillor	Phill Houlihan	Not elected	Details	
Wellington City Council	Wharangi/Onslow-Western ward councillor	Ray Bowden	Not elected	Details	
Wellington City Council	Takapū/Northern ward councillor	Mark Flynn	Not elected	Details	
Wellington City Council	Motukairangi/Eastern ward councillor	Luke Kuggeleijn	Not elected	Details	
Marlborough District Council	Marlborough Sounds ward councillor	Malcolm Taylor	Elected		
Marlborough District Council	Blenheim ward councillor	John Hyndman	Elected		
Tasman District Council	Motueka ward councillor	David Ross	Not elected	Details	
Tasman District Council	Richmond ward councillor	Daniel Shirley	Not elected	Details	
Environment Canterbury	South Canterbury constituency councillor	Toni Severin	Not elected		
Hurunui District Council	South ward councillor	Tom Spooner	Not elected		
Waimakariri District Council	Kaiapoi-Woodend ward councillor	Nathan Atkins	Not elected		
Selwyn District Council	Kā Mānia Rolleston ward councillor	Chris Till	Not elected		
Timaru District Council	Timaru ward councillor	John Bolt	Not elected		
Otago Regional Council	Molyneux constituency councillor	Robbie Byars	Elected	Details	
Dunedin City Council	At-large ward councillor	Anthony Kenny	Not elected	Details	
24 of 77 councils		46 candidates			

== Electoral performance ==
Election	# of candidates					Winning candidates				
Election	Mayor	Council	Board	Regional council	Total	Mayor	Council	Board	Regional council	Total
2025	–	33	14	4	51	–	6 / 33	1 / 14	2 / 4	9 / 51 17.6%

== See also ==
- Local elections in New Zealand
