= Craig Jepson =

New Zealand politician (born 1957/58)

His Worship Craig Jepson

7th Mayor of Kaipara
- In office 2022–2025
- Preceded by: Jason Smith
- Succeeded by: Jonathan Larsen

Personal details
- Born: Craig Eldon Jepson; 1957 or 1958 (age 68–69)
- Occupation: Businessman

Craig Eldon Jepson (born 1957 or 1958) is a right-wing New Zealand local politician who is a Kaipara District Councillor in New Zealand's Northland Region. During the 2000s, Jepson served as a spokesperson for Olivine NZ's unsuccessful attempt to convert the former coal-powered Meremere Power Station in the north Waikato, New Zealand into a waste-to-energy station. Jepson later moved to Mangawhai where he established a concrete business that was involved in local rural and urban development. In October 2022, Jepson was elected mayor of Kaipara. As mayor, Jepson attracted media coverage following his attempt to ban karakia (Māori prayers) from council proceedings, which he subsequently reversed following significant criticism from the public and fellow councillors.

As mayor, Jepson also presided over the Kaipara District Council's withdrawal from Local Government New Zealand and decision to scrap its Māori ward without holding a referendum during the upcoming 2025 New Zealand local elections. Jepson has also questioned the consensus on climate change and expressed support for Donald Trump. In June 2025, Jepson confirmed that we would not be running for a second term as Mayor of Kaipara during the 2025 New Zealand local elections but would instead be standing as a councillor for the Kaipara District Council. During the 2025 Kaipara District Council election, Jepson was elected as a councillor to the Kaiwaka-Mangawhai ward.

== Professional career ==
During the early 2000s, Jepson spent three years lobbying in favour of Olivine NZ's attempt to convert the former coal-powered Meremere Power Station in the north Waikato, New Zealand into a waste-to-energy station. As Olivine's spokesperson, Jepson claimed that the Meremere plant's waste burning technology was cleaner than a rubbish dump and was preferable to exporting toxins overseas. While promoting the project, he claimed that Waikato "could export power instead of importing it, give its industries cheaper electricity and do away with filthy rubbish dumps." Ultimately, Olivine abandoned its plans due to opposition from local residents and environmentalists including Environment Waikato, who claimed that the plant would pump toxins and greenhouse gases into the atmosphere. Jepson stated that Olivine would sue Environment Waikato for allegedly obstructing the resource consent process.

Jepson settled in Mangawhai around 2002. He established a concrete business and was involved in rural and urban land development. Jepson was also involved in several local projects in Mangawhai including the construction of a 3.5-kilometre-long (2.2 mi) walking–cycle track.

== Political career ==
In 2020, Jepson sponsored a petition in Northland calling for a local referendum on the Kaipara District Council's plans to introduce Māori wards and constituencies.

During the 2022 New Zealand local elections, Jepson stood as a candidate for the Mayor of Kaipara on the Democracy Northland local body ticket. On the economic front, he campaigned for a review of the Kaipara District Council's staffing levels and expenditure, repairing roads and infrastructure, and stopping "proliferate" [sic] spending on so-called "feel-good" projects. Jepson also campaigned against the New Zealand Government's Three Waters reform programme, claiming that the four proposed water services entities would become "self-serving goliaths" that would waste ratepayers' money. In addition, Jepson opposed co-governance particularly the presence of Māori wards on local government bodies.

On 7 October 2022, Jepson was elected mayor of Kaipara. In late October, Jepson appointed councillor Jonathan Larsen as deputy mayor. In March 2025, a New Zealand Taxpayers' Union-Curia poll ranked Jepson as New Zealand's third most popular Mayor out of 51 polled councils. The poll awarded him a 35% approval rating, with a margin of error of 9.6%. The poll results were based on 24,000 monthly responses across a randomly selected pool of 1,000 people surveyed between January and November 2023 and February 2024 and February 2025. Only cities and districts with 100 or more accumulated responses during that period were reported in polling results.

=== Conflicts with Māori ===
==== 2022 Karakia controversy ====
On 30 November 2022, Jepson attracted media attention after interrupting Māori ward councillor Pera Paniora's karakia (Māori prayer). In response, Race Relations Commissioner Meng Foon criticised Jepson's karakia ban from council proceedings, stating that it was very important for councils and all organisations to create the right space for Māori to honour the Treaty of Waitangi and to express their culture and language. Despite criticism, Jepson refused to back down and banned karakia from council meetings on 3 December on the grounds that specific religions or cultures should not be included in secular meetings.

On 8 December, Jepson and other members of the Kaipara District Council reached a compromise that would allow councillors to recite karakia, issue statements and reflections on a rotating basis. Paniora welcomed the compromise, stating that "it does mean that all the councillors feel included and comfortable and we are not forcing anything on them that they don't agree with." Meng Foon commended Jepson for backtracking on the ban and suggested that the local community needed to undergo a healing process. By that stage, a petition calling for Jepson to resign as mayor had attracted over 5,500 signatures.

On 14 December 300 people participated in a hīkoi (protest march) in Dargaville to protest Jepson's earlier decision to ban karakia. The hīkoi marched from Dargaville's town centre to the Kaipara District Council's meeting venue at the Northern Wairoa War Memorial Hall. The hīkoi was organised by Paturiri Toautu, who stood as a candidate for the council's new Te Moananui o Kaipara Māori ward during the 2022 local election. In response to the hīkoi, Jepson stated that he respected the participants' democratic rights to express their views but criticised Meng Foon and the Minister of Local Government, Nanaia Mahuta, for allegedly interfering in local community matters.

==== Bilingualism and co-governance ====
In July 2023, Jepson issued a directive to remove the Māori language from the Kaipara District's annual plan despite councillors agreeing on the sole bilingual copy. He claimed that he was motivated by a desire to produce "easier to read" documents. Jepson later proposed translating the English report into a Māori language one using artificial intelligence. Following pushback from local Māori iwi, Jepson issued a directive for a bilingual report based on the English annual plan to be produced. Jepson's decisions particularly the use of AI translation software were criticised by fellow Councillor Paniora, who described it as disrespectful to Māori and claimed that it would lead to the "bastardisation" of the Māori language.

On 26 July 2023, several Māori speakers including Paniora, Mangawhai resident Caren Davis, and Aotearoa Liberation League spokesperson Pere Huriwai-Seger defended the importance of Tikanga Māori (Māori knowledge), Māori empowerment, and criticised Jepson's handling of the annual report's Māori translation. Huriwai-Seger also urged the District Council not to give a platform to controversial activist Julian Batchelor's controversial "Stop Co-Governance" national tour. In response, Jepson introduced Batchelor as a "surprise" guest speaker and defended him on "free speech" grounds.

==== Māori ward ====
On 7 August 2024, Jepson joined a majority of the Kaipara District Council's membership in voting to disestablish the Council's Te Moananui o Kaipara Māori ward, which had been introduced during the 2022 New Zealand local elections and was won by Councillor Pera Paniora. The extraordinary council meeting attracted 150 protesters calling for the retention of the Council's Māori ward. The vote passed by a margin of six to three with one abstention. Following the vote, Jepson stated "I reject the notion that Māori must have a designated ward to ensure representation. The establishment and need for Māori wards relies on a false narrative." While Democracy NZ's Frank Newman welcome the council's vote, Ngāti Whātua's representative body "Te Runanga o Ngāti Whātua" announce it would file legal action against the council for failing to consult Māori.

==== Tūheitia's death ====
On 4 September 2024, Jepson declined to hold a moment of silence to mark the passing of Māori King Tūheitia, who died in late August 2024, stating "No, I'm not going to do that today. It's not on the agenda." Councillor Paniora described Jepson's actions as disrespectful towards Māori.

=== Withdrawal from LGNZ ===
In late May 2023, Jepson led the Kaipara District Council's decision to withdraw from Local Government New Zealand (LGNZ), the national representative body for local government bodies. Jepson claimed that LGNZ tended to represent government views to councils rather than councils' views to the government. Jepson's withdrawal motion was supported by Deputy Mayor Jonathan Larsen and fellow Crs Ash Nayaar, Gordon Lambeth, Ron Manderson, and Rachael Williams. The withdrawal motion was opposed by Crs Pera Paniora and Eryn Wilson-Collins while Crs Mike Howard and Mark Vincent were absent from the meeting.

=== 2025 local elections ===
In June 2025, Jepson confirmed that he would not be running for a second term as Mayor of Kaipara during the 2025 New Zealand local elections in October 2025. He instead endorsed Deputy Mayor Jonathan Larsen as a mayoral candidate. Jepson confirmed he would be running as a councillor in the Kaipara District Council's Kaiwaka-Mangawhai ward. During the 2025 Kaipara District Council election that closed on 11 October, Jepson was elected to the Kaiwaka-Mangawhai Ward. Larsen was also elected as Mayor of Kaipara, defeating fellow councillor Snow Tane by a margin of 21 votes.

On 16 October 2025, Jepson called an emergency meeting 24 hours prior to the release of the 2025 Kaipara District Council election, using a special provision in the Local Government Act that allows a mayor to call an extraordinary meeting without the usual three-day notice period. He said that the purpose of the emergency meeting was to approve a complaint and request an investigation into alleged improprieties that occurred during the 2025 Kaipara District Council election and 2025 Northland Regional Council Māori constituency referendum. Following a tense public meeting, the Kaipara District Council voted by a margin of 5 to 3 votes to back Jepson's complaint letter alleging irregularities in the election process. On 20 October, the Department of Internal Affairs's local government general manager Richard Ward confirmed the department had received Jepson's complaint but clarified that it did not have the jurisdiction to investigate the complaint and was unable to halt the release of local election results in Kaipara. The Department clarified that Kaipara's electoral officer Dale Ofsoske had jurisdiction to investigate electoral irregularities. Ofsoske vouched for the integrity of the 2025 Kaipara and Northland elections. Kaipara District Council chief executive Jason Marris said that several "small issues" about the elections had been addressed, with only one complaint being referred to the Police.

== Views and positions ==
=== Climate change skepticism ===
Jepson has questioned the scientific consensus on climate change. In December 2022, he circulated copies of Bjørn Lomborg's book False Alarm – How climate change panic costs us trillions, hurts the poor and fails to fix the planet to fellow members of the Kaipara District Council.

=== Co-governance and race relations ===
Jepson has opposed the New Zealand Government's Three Waters reform programme and co-governance policies such as the Māori wards and constituencies.

=== Politics ===
Jepson and his partner Jeanette Reid participated in the 2022 Wellington protests in opposition to the Government's COVID-19 vaccine mandates.

Jepson has also expressed support for United States President Donald Trump, saying that he admired Trump's ability to "go against the grain" and shared Trump's approach towards freedom of choice, less government and free speech. Jepson also welcome Trump's victory during the 2024 United States presidential election as "the end of woke" and held a celebratory gathering at his home.

== Personal life ==
Craig Jepson lives in Mangawhai with his partner Jeanette Reid. He is an avid fisherman, sailor and cyclist.
