= Whangarei District Council =

Territorial authority of New Zealand

Coordinates: 35.6917539°S 173.7063588°E

Whangarei District Council Te Kaunihera o Whangarei
- Coat of arms

- Brand logo

Type
- Type: Territorial authority of Whangārei
- Term limits: None

History
- Established: 1 November 1989; 36 years ago
- Preceded by: Whangarei County Council; Whangarei City Council; Hikuranga Town Council; Otamatea County Council
- New session started: 18 October 2025

Leadership
- Mayor: Ken Couper, Ind. since 18 October 2025
- Deputy: Scott McKenzie, Ind. since 28 October 2025
- CEO: Simon Weston since 7 April 2022

Structure
- Seats: 14 (including mayor)
- Political groups: Independent (13); ACT Local (1)

Elections
- Voting system: Single transferrable vote
- First election: 14 October 1989
- Last election: 11 October 2025
- Next election: 14 October 2028

Motto
- Non nobis solum

Meeting place
- Te Iwitahi, Whangārei

Website
- wdc.govt.nz

Whangārei District Council (abbr. WDC; Māori: Te Kaunihera o Whangārei) is the territorial authority for the Whangārei District of New Zealand. It serves as the district's local government alongside the Northland Regional Council as the regional council. The current entity has existed since 1989, prior to which local government in the area was split between four local authorities.

The governing body of the council has 13 councillors and is chaired by the mayor of Whangārei (currently Ken Couper since October 2025).

== History ==
=== 1989 reforms ===
Whangarei District Council was formed on 1 November 1989 by an amalgamation of Whangarei City Council, Whangarei County Council and Hikurangi Town Council as part of New Zealand's 1989 local government reforms.

== Governing body ==
=== Mayor ===
One mayor is elected at-large; they chair meetings of the governing body and act as the head of local government in the district.

=== Current composition ===
The current members of the governing body of council are:

| Role | Portrait | Name | Affiliation | Ward |
|---|---|---|---|---|
| Mayor | | Ken Couper | Independent | Elected at-large |
| Deputy | | Scott McKenzie | Independent | Hikurangi-Coastal |
| Councillor | | Steven Martin | Independent | Hikurangi-Coastal |
| Councillor | | Matthew Yovich | ACT Local | Bream Bay |
| Councillor | | David Baldwin | Independent | Bream Bay |
| Councillor | | Simon Reid | Independent | Mangakahia-Maungatapere |
| Councillor | | Tangiwai Baker | Independent | Whangārei Heads |
| Councillor | | Nicholas Hunter Connop | Independent | Whangārei Urban |
| Councillor | | Brad Flower | Independent | Whangārei Urban |
| Councillor | | Crichton Christie | Independent | Whangārei Urban |
| Councillor | | Paul Yovich | Independent | Whangārei Urban |
| Councillor | | Marie Olsen | Independent | Whangārei Urban |
| Councillor | | Deb Harding | Independent | Whangārei District Māori |
| Councillor | | Phoenix Ruka | Independent | Whangārei District Māori |

== Elections ==
=== List ===
==== Mayoral ====
- 1989
- 1992
- 1995
- 1998
- 2001
- 2004
- 2007
- 2010
- 2013
- 2016
- 2019
- 2022
- 2025

==== Council ====
- 1989
- 1992
- 1995
- 1998
- 2001
- 2004
- 2007
- 2010
- 2013
- 2016
- (2017)
- 2019
- 2022
- 2025

== Wards ==
The council has always had six wards, electing thirteen councillors, but the composition of the wards has changed.

The original six wards were Denby (the northern part of Whangārei city, with three councillors), Okara (the southern part of Whangārei city, with four councillors) and Bream Bay (two councillors), Coastal (two councillors), Hikurangi (one councillor) and Maungatapere (one councillor). In 2007, a new Whangarei Heads ward was created (one councillor) and the Coastal and Hikurangi communities were combined as the Hikurangi-Coastal ward (two councillors). In 2022, a district-wide Māori ward was created and Denby and Okara were merged as the Whangārei Urban ward.
