= Vince Cocurullo =

New Zealand politician and former mayor

His Worship Vince Cocurullo
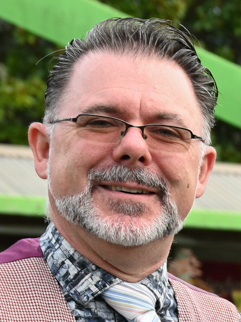

23rd Mayor of Whangārei
- In office 2022–2025
- Preceded by: Sheryl Mai
- Succeeded by: Ken Couper

Personal details
- Occupation: Engineer, businessman

Vince Cocurullo is a New Zealand politician who served as Mayor of Whangārei between 2022 and 2025. He also worked as an engineer and information technology business owner. During the 2026 New Zealand general election, Cocurullo stood as New Zealand First's candidate for Whangārei.

== Early life and professional career ==
Cocurullo was born in Whangārei. Between 1990 and 2000, he also worked as a civil engineer. He is an Italian New Zealander. Cocurullo has volunteered in several global projects including water projects in Africa and teaching English in Yemen. He also founded and runs an information technology business called Cocurullo's Ltd .

== Local government career ==
Between 2007 and 2010, Cocurullo served as a councillor for the Whangārei District Council's Okara Ward. In 2016, he was re-elected to the Council under the "Go-Whangarei" electoral ticket. In 2019, Cocurullo was endorsed by the "Better Whangarei" electoral ticket, which campaigned on a platform of stopping excessive rate increases, boosting the number of carparks, reducing Council fees and red tapes, and a pro-growth agenda. He was also a member of the Northland District Health Board from 2019 until its dissolution in 2022.

=== Mayor of Whangārei, 2022–2025 ===
During the 2022 New Zealand local elections, Cocurullo ran for the office of Mayor of Whangārei. In early October 2022, he denied having links to a political group endorsing him. During the 2022 Whangārei mayoral election which concluded on 8 October, Cocorullo ousted the incumbent Mayor Sheryl Mai, winning 7,132 votes based on preliminary results. In November 2022, Cocurullo voiced support for the District Council's new Māori ward, saying that the community "should all be very proud of" its representatives being elected by Whangārei Māori on the Māori roll.

As Mayor of Whāngarei, Cocurullo's first year was dominated by the emergency response to Cyclone Gabrielle in February 2023 and Cyclone Lola in October 2023 and the opening of the Council's new $59 million civic centre and council head office Te Iwitah. Following the formation of the Sixth National Government after the 2023 New Zealand general election held on 14 October, he called on the incoming government to scrap the contentious Three Waters programme, the construction of a four-lane 80km stretch on State Highway 1 between Auckland and Whāngarei, funding a proper hospital in the city and extending the North Auckland Line to Marsden Point. He also advocated shifting the Port of Auckland's operations to Whāngarei.

In June 2024, Cocurullo was criticised by five Whangārei councillors for refusing to allow the council to debate a motion to lobby the central government about the Gaza war. He had turned down the motion on the grounds that it was beyond the remit of local government. Cocurullo also rejected a petition on the matter submitted by the Palestinian solidarity group Palestinian Solidarity Network of Whangārei (PSNW) In response, PSNW spokesperson Tim Howard expressed support for the dissident councillors and organised a protest march in Whangārei.

On 29 November 2024, Cocurullo and the Whangārei District Council voted by a margin of 7 to 6 votes to reject a directive by the Ministry of Health to flouridate their water supply. He said that he did not believe flouridating the district's water supply would address its dental health problems but advocated educating people about good hygiene and eating a balance diet. On 12 February 2025, Cocurullo reiterated the Whangārei Council's refusal to comply with an order by Director-General of Health Diana Sarfati to fluoridate its water supply, vowing to challenge the order ath the High Court on the grounds of community input and fighting for local democracy. On 17 March 2025, the Council rescinded its decision in November 2024 to defy a Government directive to flouridate its water supply, pending a High Court injunction on the matter expected to be released the following day.

In March 2025, a New Zealand Taxpayers' Union-Curia poll ranked Cocurullo as the second least popular Mayor out of 51 polled councils. The poll awarded him a minus 26% approval rating, with a margin of error of 3.8%. The poll results were based on 24,000 monthly responses across a randomly selected pool of 1,000 people surveyed between January and November 2023 and February 2024 and February 2025. Only cities and districts with 100 or more accumulated responses during that period were reported in polling results.

During the 2025 Whangārei District Council election on 11 October, Cocurullo was defeated during the mayoral race by Ken Couper by a margin of 433 votes; coming second place with 11,983 votes. He attributed his defeat to a hate speech campaign driven by his opposition to a Government flouridation order. Couper had opposed Cocurullo's anti-flouridation campaign but denied he had led a hate campaign targeting the outgoing Mayor. In late October 2025, Cocurullo ruled out seeking a recount despite the close 433 vote margin between him and Couper. He opted to spend time with his wife, whose mother had died earlier in the month.

== New Zealand First ==
In late May 2026, New Zealand First leader Winston Peters announced Cocurullo would be standing as the party's candidate in Whangārei during a party rally in the town. On 7 October 2026, Cocurullo was ranked 31st place on New Zealand First's party list for the 2026 New Zealand general election. Cocurullo said he would focus on improving infrastructure and healthcare services in his electorate including the State Highway 1 route through Brynderwyn. Cocurullo also proposed easing taxes on fuel and recycling plastic into diesel fuel.

During the 2026 general election held on 7 November, Cocurullo came third place with 5,842 votes in Whangārei based on preliminary results; with National Party candidate Lloyd Budd and Labour Party candidate Gary Payinda coming first and second place respectively. He also failed to enter the New Zealand Parliament via the party list based on preliminary results.

== Personal life ==
Cocurullo is married to Lee Cocurullo, who worked as a real estate agent for 20 years. She is also a dancer and Zumba instructor. He is Christian, with his father being Roman Catholic and his mother being Seventh-day Adventist. Cocurullo attended both Catholic and Protestant services during his childhood. His father died in 1984 and his mother subsequently remarried. His father and grandfather were engineers, prompting him to study civil engineering. In 2005, Cocurullo became ill after experiencing mercury poisoning caused by amalgam fillings inside his teeth. This experience motivated him to enter local government politics in Whangārei and led him to oppose a Health Ministry fluoridation order in 2024-25.

Cocurullo lives in a family home in Whangārei that was built by his grandfather Giacomo Cocurullo, who also planted grape vines on the estate.
