= Mayor of Whangārei =

New Zealand political office

- Coat of arms of Whangārei

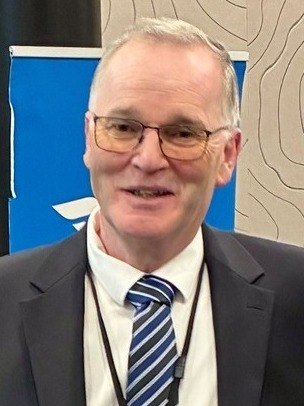
- Incumbent; Ken Couper
- Style: His/Her Worship
- Seat: Whangārei
- Term length: 3 years, renewable
- Formation: 27 October 1896
- First holder: James Miller Killen
- Deputy: Scott McKenzie
- Salary: $163,689
- Website: Official website

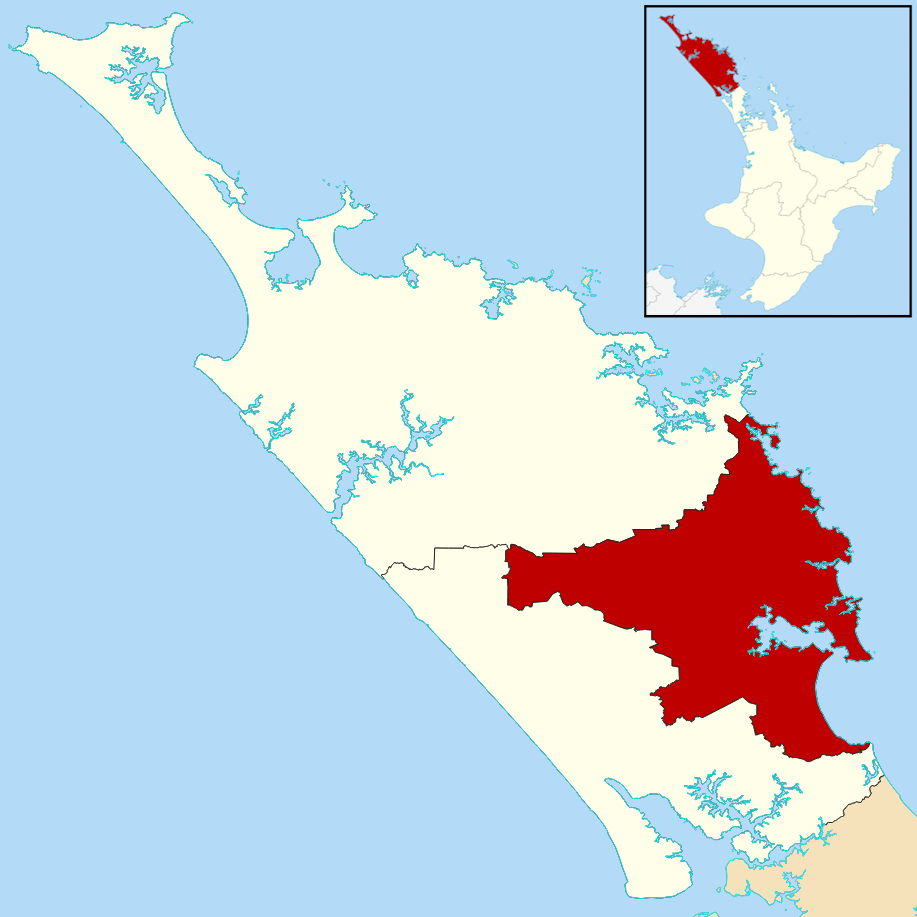
Map of the Whangārei District within Northland

The mayor of Whangārei is the elected head of local government in the Whangārei District of New Zealand's North Island; one of 67 mayors in the country. The principal town of the district (and its namesake) is Whangārei. The mayor presides over the Whangārei District Council and is directly elected using the Single Transferable Vote (STV) method (as of 2025).

The position has existed since 27 October 1896, when the Whangarei Borough Council was constituted. Later the mayor presided over Whangarei City Council. The position has existed in its present form since 1 November 1989, following the amalgamation of Whangarei County Council, Whangarei City Council and Hikurangi Town Board. The mayor is supported by a deputy mayor.

== List of mayors ==
The following table is a complete list of the mayors of Whangarei since the formation of Whangarei Borough in 1896.

	Name	Portrait	Term of office
1	James Miller Killen		1896–1899
2	William Corns		1899–1901
(1)	James Miller Killen		1901–1902
(2)	William Corns		1902–1904
(1)	James Miller Killen		1904–1905
3	Harry Weaver		1905–1908
4	Thomas McClintock		1908–1910
5	Thomas Herbert Steadman		1910–1914
6	Donald William Jack		1914–1917
7	John Samuel Dent		1917–1921
8	Donald Alexander McLean		1921–1925
9	James Edmund Holmes		1925–1927
10	Leonard James Brake		1927–1929
11	William Jones		1929–1953
12	Horace William James		1953–1954
13	Les McKinnon		1954–1956
14	Frank Johnson		1956–1968
15	Ken Haslett		1968–1977
16	Ted Elliott		1977–1983
17	Joyce Ryan		1983–1989
18	Stan Semenoff		1989–1998
19	Craig Brown		1998–2004
20	Pamela Peters		2004–2007
(18)	Stan Semenoff		2007–2010
21	Morris Cutforth		2010–2013
22	Sheryl Mai		2013–2022
23	Vince Cocurullo		2022–2025
24	Ken Couper		2025–present

== Deputy mayor ==
The deputy mayor is the second highest elected official in the Whangarei District Council. The deputy mayor acts in support of the Mayor of Whangarei. It is the second highest elected position in the council. However, like the position of Deputy Prime Minister, this seniority does not necessarily translate into power. They are appointed by the mayor from the elected ward councillors.

Beyond committees of the whole council, the deputy mayor is an ex-officio member of the following Whangarei District Council committees:

- Community Development Committee
- Finance and Corporate Committee
- Infrastructure Committee
- Planning and Development Committee

The deputy mayor may be appointed to additional committees that the mayor wishes to appoint them to. The following table lists the deputy mayors since the local government reforms of 1989.

Mayor	Deputy mayor	Term of office
Stan Semenoff		
Craig Brown		
Pamela Peters	Phil Halse	2004–2007
Stan Semenoff	Kahu Sutherland	2007–2010
Morris Cutforth	Phil Halse	2010–2013
Sheryl Mai	Sharon Morgan	2013–2019
Sheryl Mai	Greg Innes	2019–2022
Vince Cocurullo	Phil Halse	2022–2025
Ken Couper	Scott McKenzie	2025–present
