= 2025 Whangārei District Council election =

Elections in New Zealand

- 11 October 2025
- Turnout: 30,490 (45.50% ▲2.23 pp)
- Mayor
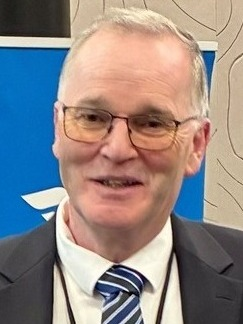

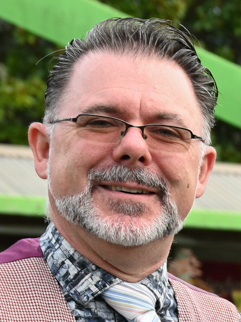

Candidate	Ken Couper	Vince Cocurullo
Party	Independent	Independent
Primary vote	8,668	8,173
Percentage	28.43%	26.81%
Final vote	12,418	11,983
Percentage	50.89%	49.11%
	Ind
Candidate	Marie Olsen	Brad Flower
Party	Independent	Independent
Primary vote	6,746	5,786
Percentage	22.13%	18.98%
Mayor before election
Vince Cocurullo
Independent
Elected mayor
Ken Couper
Independent
- Councillors
- 13 seats on the governing body of Whangārei District Council; 7 seats needed for a majority
Party	Seats	+/–
Independent	12	−1
ACT Local	1	+1
This lists parties that won seats. See the complete results below.
Control before	Control after
No majority	No majority

The 2025 Whangārei District Council election was a local election held from 9 September to 11 October in the Whangārei District of New Zealand as part of that year's territorial authority elections and other local elections held nation-wide.

Voters elected the mayor of Whangārei and 13 district councillors for the 2025–2028 term of the Whangārei District Council. Postal voting and the single transferable voting voting system were used.

Councillor Ken Couper won the mayoralty, defeating incumbent mayor Vince Cocurullo.

The council introduced a Māori ward at the 2022 election; in a referendum on its future held alongside this election (as part of a nation-wide series of referendums) voters elected to remove the Māori ward for future elections.

== Key dates ==
- 4 July 2025: Nominations for candidates opened
- 1 August 2025: Nominations for candidates closed at 12 pm
- 9 September 2025: Voting documents were posted and voting opened
- 11 October 2025: Voting closed at 12 pm and progress/preliminary results were published
- 16–19 October 2025: Final results were declared.

== Background ==
=== Positions up for election ===
Voters elected thirteen councillors in six wards, as well as the mayor of Whangārei. Voters in the district also elected members of the Northland Regional Council. (Note: 3 councillors fully elected from the district in the Whangārei Central, Coastal Central, and Coastal South general constituencies; 3 councillors partially elected from the district in the Mid North general, Kaipara general, and Te Raki Māori constituencies, respectively)

=== Māori wards referendum ===
In November 2020, the Whangārei District Council voted 8–6 to establish a Māori ward for the 2022 and 2025 elections.

In July 2024, the National-led coalition government passed the Local Government (Electoral Legislation and Māori Wards and Māori Constituencies) Amendment Act 2024 which reinstated the requirement that councils must hold a referendum before establishing Māori wards or constituencies. In August 2024, the council voted 12–1 to affirm their decision to establish the Māori constituency, thereby triggering a referendum on the constituency to be held alongside the 2025 local elections.

== List of candidates ==
=== Incumbents not seeking re-election ===
- Gavin Benney, councillor for the Hikurangi-Coastal general ward
- Phil Halse, deputy mayor and incumbent councillor for the Bream Bay general ward
- Patrick Holmes, incumbent councillor for the Whangārei Heads general ward

=== Mayor ===
Candidate	Photo	Affiliation (Note: A candidate may leave their affiliation blank, run as an independent, or run with an affiliation to an organisation, local body ticket or political party. Whangārei District Council does not allow election slogans to be used for the affiliation.)	Notes
Vince Cocurullo		None	Incumbent mayor since 2022
Ken Couper		Independent	Incumbent councillor. Previously ran for the mayoralty in 2022. Also ran for re-election as a councillor in the Bream Bay general ward.
Brad Flower		Independent	Previously ran for the mayoralty in 2022. Also ran to be a councillor in the Whangārei Urban general ward.
Fiona Green		None	
Marie Olsen		Independent	Councillor for the Whangārei Urban general ward. Also ran for re-election in the Whangārei Urban general ward.

=== Councillors ===
==== Whangārei District Māori ward ====
The Whangārei District Māori ward returned two councillors to the district council.

Candidate	Affiliation	Notes
Deb Harding	None	Incumbent councillor
Phoenix Ruka	None	Incumbent councillor
Sheila Taylor	None	

==== Bream Bay general ward ====
Bream Bay general ward returned two councillors to the district council.

Candidate	Affiliation	Notes
David Baldwin	None	
Ken Couper	Independent	Incumbent councillor. Also ran for mayor.
Paul Grace	None	
Simon Schuster	None	
Shilane Shirkey	None	
Matthew Yovich	ACT Local	Fitter-turner, youth coach and community advocate

==== Hikurangi-Coastal general ward ====
Hikurangi-Coastal general ward returned two councillors to the district council.

Candidate	Affiliation	Notes
Chanelle Armstrong	None	
Susy Bretherton	None	
Norma de Langen	None	
Ren Haskell	None	
Vicky Humphreys	None	
Stephen Gregory Martin	None	
Scott McKenzie	None	Incumbent councillor

==== Mangakahia-Maungatapere general ward ====
Mangakahia-Maungatapere general ward returned one councillor to the district council.

Candidate	Affiliation	Notes
Simon Reid	Independent	Incumbent councillor
Tim Robinson	None	

==== Whangārei Heads general ward ====
Whangārei Heads general ward returned one councillor to the district council.

Candidate	Affiliation	Notes
Tangiwai Baker	None	
Spencer Penney	None	
Jon Twyman	None	
Anthony Huon Wild	None	

==== Whangārei Urban general ward ====
Whangārei Urban general ward returned five councillors to the district council.

Candidate	Affiliation	Notes
Jesse Card	None	
Crichton Christie	None	
Nicholas Connop	None	Incumbent councillor
Philip George Cullen	None	
Tony Dingle	Independent	
Tiana Epati	None	
Brad Flower	Independent	Also ran for mayor
Jayne Golightly	Independent	Incumbent councillor
Paul Gosling	None	
Gabriel Henry	None	
Heath Kewene	None	
Marie Olsen	Independent	Incumbent councillor. Also ran for mayor.
Julie Pepper	None	
Carol Peters	None	Incumbent councillor
Jodie Rameka	None	
Adam Young	Independent	
Paul Yovich	Independent	Incumbent councillor

== Results ==
=== 2025 Whangārei mayoral election ===
2025 Whangārei mayoral election
Party	Candidate	Primary votes	%	±%	Iteration	
Party	Candidate	Primary votes	%	±%	#	Votes
Independent	Ken Couper	8,668	28.43	+11.03	4th	12,418
Independent	Vince Cocurullo^{†}	8,173	26.81	−1.37	4th	11,983
Independent	Marie Olsen	6,746	22.13	(new)	3rd	8,323
Independent	Brad Flower	5,786	18.98	+2.83	2nd	5,895
Independent	Fiona Green	708	2.32	−1.37	1st	708
Quota		15,041	49.33	n/a		
Informal votes		64	0.21	+0.06		
Blank votes		345	1.13	+0.07		
Turnout		30,490	45.50	+2.23		
Registered electors		67,004				
Independent gain from Independent on 4th iteration						
^{†} incumbent

=== Bream Bay general ward ===
2025 Bream Bay general ward election
Party	Candidate	Primary votes	%	±%	Iteration	
Party	Candidate	Primary votes	%	±%	#	Votes
ACT Local	Matthew Yovich	1,698	33.04	(new)	1st	1,698
Independent	David Baldwin	987	19.20	(new)	4th	1,472
Independent	Simon Schuster	853	16.60	(new)	4th	1,218
Independent	Paul Grace	706	13.74	(new)	2nd	779
Independent	Shilane Shirkey	469	9.12	−19.55	1st	469
Independent	Ken Couper^{†} (withdrawn, elected mayor)	n/a	n/a	n/a	1st	0
Quota		1,571	30.56	n/a		
Informal votes		58	1.13	+1.13		
Blank votes		84	1.63	−0.86		
Turnout		5,140	49.67	+0.71		
Registered electors		10,349				
ACT Local gain from Independent on 1st iteration						
Independent gain from Independent on 4th iteration						
^{†} incumbent

=== Hikurangi-Coastal general ward ===
2025 Hikurangi-Coastal general ward election
Party	Candidate	Primary votes	%	±%	Iteration	
Party	Candidate	Primary votes	%	±%	#	Votes
Independent	Scott McKenzie^{†}	1,243	29.25	−5.20	4th	1,359
Independent	Stephen Gregory Martin	956	22.50	−8.98	6th	1,260
Independent	Susy Bretherton	873	20.55	(new)	6th	1,149
Independent	Chanelle Armstrong	385	9.06	(new)	4th	506
Independent	Norma Margaret De Langen	291	6.85	(new)	3rd	318
Independent	Vicky Humphreys	231	5.44	(new)	2nd	242
Independent	Ren Haskell	143	3.37	(new)	1st	143
Quota		1,374	32.34	n/a		
Informal votes		40	0.94	+0.87		
Blank votes		87	2.05	+0.54		
Turnout		4,249	50.39	+0.59		
Registered electors		8,432				
Independent hold on 4th iteration						
Independent gain from Independent on 6th iteration						
^{†} incumbent

=== Mangakahia-Maungatapere general ward ===
2025 Mangakahia-Maungatapere general ward election
Party	Candidate	Primary votes	%	±%	Iteration	
Party	Candidate	Primary votes	%	±%	#	Votes
Independent	Simon Reid^{†}	1,476	58.09	−7.63	1st	1,476
Independent	Tim Robinson	1,003	39.47	(new)	1st	1,003
Quota		1,240	48.80	n/a		
Informal votes		4	0.16	+0.12		
Blank votes		58	2.28	−2.41		
Turnout		2,541	54.08	+3.32		
Registered electors		4,699				
Independent hold on 1st iteration						
^{†} incumbent

=== Whangārei Heads general ward ===
2025 Whangārei Heads general ward election
Party	Candidate	Primary votes	%	±%	Iteration	
Party	Candidate	Primary votes	%	±%	#	Votes
Independent	Tangiwai Baker	1,253	39.11	(new)	3rd	1,406
Independent	Spence Penney	1,076	33.58	(new)	3rd	1,288
Independent	Anthony Huon Wild	472	14.73	(new)	2nd	601
Independent	Jonathan Twyman	337	10.52	(new)	1st	337
Quota		1,569	48.97	n/a		
Informal votes		5	0.16	+0.12		
Blank votes		61	1.90	−3.25		
Turnout		3,204	60.60	+4.73		
Registered electors		5,287				
Independent gain from Independent on 3rd iteration						

=== Whangārei Urban general ward ===
2025 Whangārei Urban general ward election
Party	Candidate	Primary votes	%	±%	Iteration	
Party	Candidate	Primary votes	%	±%	#	Votes
Independent	Marie Olsen^{†}	2,076	17.67	−11.68	1st	2,076
Independent	Brad Flower	1,797	15.29	(new)	10th	1,889
Independent	Nicholas Hunter Connop^{†}	1,484	12.63	−21.30	16th	1,874
Independent	Paul Yovich^{†}	1,047	8.91	−22.58	18th	1,877
Independent	Chrichton Christie	1,182	10.06	−15.29	19th	1,412
Independent	Carol Peters^{†}	932	7.93	−24.99	19th	1,549
Independent	Jayne Golightly^{†}	609	5.18	−38.59	16th	976
Independent	Philip George Cullen	513	4.37	(new)	15th	645
Independent	Tony Dingle	449	3.82	(new)	14th	582
Independent	Tiana Epati	385	3.28	(new)	11th	502
Independent	Jesse Card	243	2.07	(new)	10th	280
Independent	Jodie Rameka	189	1.61	(new)	9th	210
Independent	Paul Gosling	151	1.28	(new)	8th	159
Independent	Julie Pepper	100	0.85	(new)	7th	117
Independent	Heath Kewene	87	0.74	(new)	6th	98
Independent	Adam Young	94	0.80	−8.79	4th	96
Independent	Gabriel Anthony Wilhelm Henry	59	0.50	(new)	2nd	60
Quota		1,900	16.17	n/a		
Informal votes		160	1.36	+0.84		
Blank votes		194	1.65	+0.42		
Turnout		11,751	42.22	+6.51		
Registered electors		27,831				
Independent hold on 1st iteration						
Independent gain from Independent on 10th iteration						
Independent hold on 16th iteration						
Independent hold on 18th iteration						
Independent gain from Independent on 19th iteration						
^{†} incumbent

=== Whangārei District Māori ward ===
2025 Whangārei District Māori ward election
Party	Candidate	Primary votes	%	±%	Iteration	
Party	Candidate	Primary votes	%	±%	#	Votes
Independent	Deb Harding^{†}	1,355	37.59	−1.44	1st	1,355
Independent	Phoenix Ruka^{†}	1,426	39.56	+1.17	1st	1,426
Independent	Sheila Taylor	711	19.72	(new)	1st	711
Quota		1,164	32.29	n/a		
Informal votes		31	0.86	+0.82		
Blank votes		82	2.27	−0.36		
Turnout		3,605	34.64	+10.82		
Registered electors		10,406				
Independent gain from Te Pāti Māori on 1st iteration						
Independent hold on 1st iteration						
^{†} incumbent

=== Referendum on Māori wards ===
Choice	Votes	%
I vote to KEEP Māori wards	13,346	55.69
I vote to REMOVE Māori wards	10,619	44.31
Total	23,965	100.00
Valid votes	23,965	97.59
Invalid votes	17	0.07
Blank votes	574	2.34
Total votes	24,556	100.00
Registered voters/turnout	34,067	72.08
Source: FNDC & MCERT
