= Jason Smith (New Zealand politician) =

New Zealand politician (born 1971/72)

6th Mayor of Kaipara
- In office 20 February 2018 – 2022
- Preceded by: Peter Wethey (Acting)
- Succeeded by: Craig Jepson

Personal details
- Born: Jason McLaren Smith; 1971 or 1972 (age 54–55) Dargaville, New Zealand
- Party: National
- Relations: Lockwood Smith (cousin)

Academic background
- Education: Auckland University of Technology
- Thesis: The creative country: policy, practice and place in New Zealand's creative economy 1999–2008 (2010)
- Doctoral advisor: Ian Shirley; Marilyn Waring

Jason McLaren Smith (born 1971 or 1972) is a New Zealand politician and environmentalist who served as the mayor of Kaipara from February 2018 to 2022. Prior to entering politics he was a farmer and businessman. He is standing again for mayor of Kaipara in 2025.

== Early life and career ==
Smith was born in Dargaville in New Zealand's Northland Region, but raised 30 km south in Ruawai. He is a fifth-generation resident of the Kaipara District, but went to school at King's College in Auckland. From 1991 to 1994 he studied in Cirencester at the Royal Agricultural University, graduating with a Bachelor of Science (Honours) degree in agriculture and land management. He later went on to serve as a research intern for the European Parliament, living in Luxembourg.

By 1997 he had returned to his home district of Kaipara and started his own eco-tourism company called Kauri Country. In 2002 he was appointed chief executive officer of the Kaipara Development Agency, a role he carried out while undertaking part-time study at Auckland University of Technology (AUT), earning a Diploma in Economic Development. He continued further at AUT, graduating in 2010 with a PhD in economic development, with his thesis examining New Zealand's creative industries. One of his PhD supervisors was former National MP Marilyn Waring.

He later worked as a senior policy advisor to the Ministry for Culture and Heritage in Auckland before returning to Ruawai to become a beef and sheep farmer on his family farm.

== Political career ==
After Greg Gent announced his resignation as mayor of Kaipara District in November 2017, Smith stood in the by-election to replace him. Smith was successful in the election, held in February 2018, defeating seven other candidates including acting Mayor Peter Wethey, who came second by over 300 votes. Smith took office as Kaipara's sixth mayor on 20 February 2018.

When Smith was sworn in as mayor, the Kaipara District Council had debts of around 58 million dollars. Smith promised a "fresh start" for the district, seeking to attract new ratepayers in order to bring down council debt. Smith stood for re-election as mayor in 2019, when he was challenged for the position by activist Moemoea Mohowhenua, also known as Benjamin Nathan, best known for denting the America's Cup in 1997. Smith won re-election overwhelmingly, garnering 5996 votes to Mohowehnua's 418.

Despite having faced him in the Mayoral by-election, Smith re-appointed outgoing acting Mayor Peter Wethey as Deputy Mayor after taking office. Following his 2019 re-election, he appointed second-term councillor Anna Curnow as Deputy Mayor to replace Wethey, partly to bring a gender balance to the KDC leadership.

In June 2022, Smith announced he would not be standing for re-election as Kaipara District mayor at the 2022 New Zealand local elections, instead choosing to seek the National Party's nomination for the New Zealand House of Representatives electorate of Northland at the 2023 New Zealand general election. At the time the seat was held by Labour Party MP Willow-Jean Prime, who narrowly defeated sitting National MP Matt King by 163 votes in the landslide to Labour that occurred at the 2020 New Zealand general election. Grant McCallum was selected as National candidate and won the seat in 2023.

Smith is standing again for Kaipara Mayor in the 2025 election. His campaign slogan is a Better Kaipara Again.
