= Mayors in New Zealand =

Mayors each lead a territorial authority (pictured)

Mayors in New Zealand are the directly elected leaders of New Zealand's territorial authorities. They chair local council meetings and have limited executive powers, including the ability to appoint a deputy mayor, establish committees, and select chairpersons for said committees. Their constitutional role, as laid out in the Local Government Act 2002, is to provide leadership to their councillors and citizens of their districts, and to guide the direction of council plans and policies. Mayors are elected using either the first-past-the-post or single transferable vote system.

There are currently 67 mayors, and they are formally styled His/Her Worship.

== History ==
=== 19th century ===
Attempts to set up local government following the signing of the Treaty of Waitangi in 1840 were complicated by the small and spread out population of European settlers in New Zealand. Wellington had established and elected a municipal corporation in 1842, but the Colonial Office disestablished it. The New Zealand Constitution Act 1846 enabled municipal bodies to be created, though this legislation was suspended from 1848 for five years. Provincial legislative councils were set up based on the proposed provinces in the 1846 Act, though with both elected and unelected appointments they were seen as unsatisfactory towards the goal of self-rule.

Governor George Grey tried another attempt at local government in 1851; a Charter of Incorporation for Auckland which would be the first elected local body in the colony. It failed after less than a year. Archibald Clark served as the first mayor of Auckland for this brief period.

A second constitution act in 1852 established six provinces with powers over areas such as education, immigration, and tariffs. It was thought that these would suffice for local representation but municipal governments were created anyway in Auckland, Dunedin, and Christchurch. William Mason served as Dunedin's first mayor from 1865, whilst John Hall served as the first chairman of Christchurch Town Council from 1862. The powers of these authorities was legislated in 1867 with the Municipal Corporations Act, establishing responsibility over gasworks, libraries, and other public utilities. Suffrage for these bodies was limited to individual male property owners, which disenfranchised Māori as collective ownership was more common amongst them.

Provinces were abolished in 1876 and their powers were mostly transferred to central government. Municipal and local governments did see their powers expanded, with power to levy rates, manage local infrastructure such as roads, and manage local utilities like museums and libraries. Further expansion in powers occurred with the Municipal Corporations Act 1876.

=== 20th century ===
An explosion in the number of local bodies had occurred to the point that by 1920 there were 625 different authorities across the country. The Town Planning Act 1926 started a period of serious attempts at reforming local government. The act required the drafting of town planning schemes by boroughs with over 1000 people by 1 January 1930. The Great Depression hindered efforts though, with the requirement going unenforced.

The First Labour Government tried again to reform local government in 1936, but the bill got neglected as the Second World War dominated the agenda. The bill was picked up again in 1944, and in 1946 the Local Government Commission was set up. Its goal was to develop plans for the reorganisation of local authorities. The incoming First National Government in 1949 weakened the ability of the commission to enforce its plans.

A total of 669 local authorities existed in 1973, and the newly elected Third Labour Government set forth on reform, headed by Minister of Local Government Henry May. The powers of the Local Government Commission were increased and poll requirements to reject amalgamation plans were increased. 22 regional governments were set up, with elected bodies in Wellington and Auckland and appointed bodies elsewhere. The subsequent Third National Government again lessened the powers of the commission.

=== 1989 reforms ===
By 1987 hundreds of special purpose bodies and dozens of local and municipal authorities were in existence. The Fourth Labour Government initiated a major review, looking to change the structure of local government in the country in time for the 1989 local elections. An amendment to the Local Government Act 1974 was passed in 1989, establishing a new structure and constitutional arrangement for local government. Important developments included mandatory annual reports to be published publicly. A key factor of the reforms was ensuring public accountability in the new amalgamated authorities.

== Powers and responsibilities ==
Currently, all of New Zealand's territorial authorities are headed by a directly elected mayor. This set-up goes back to the 1989 local government reforms. Prior to 1989, there were 850 authorities at various levels with varying powers and responsibilities. Now there are 78 bodies, 67 excluding regional councils (which do not have mayors).

When the Auckland councils were merged in 2010, a more defined set of powers for mayors in all parts of the country was implemented into the existing Local Government Act 2002. Mayors now could appoint deputy mayors, as well as designate which councillors would chair and lead the various committees that ran the business of council. These new powers did raise concern though, with no mayoral veto, councils where the mayor lacked majority support could crawl to a halt as councillors pushed against the agenda of the mayor. Such dysfunctionality has reportedly occurred in several councils, including recently in Wellington and Tauranga. These changes were not seen to affect the way mayors operated in practice.

Mayors in New Zealand are considered weak in terms of the level of executive power they can wield, as granted to them via legislation. Councils are empowered to endeavour to achieve the "four well-beings", specifically the social, environmental, cultural, and economic health of their communities. This has been described as the "power of general competence." In general, council responsibilities include local roads, water management, waste management, public services such as libraries, and district parks.

Mayors report that they utilise de facto powers to achieve their goals as leaders, including their ability to build relationships with their communities, other councillors, mana whenua, and central government. Achieving consensus is key to the ability of a mayor to govern. The relationship between a mayor and a council's chief executive officer was reported by mayors as important in shaping and delivering policy. Mayors who worked closely with their councillors, those that built personal relationships and trust, were more successful at seeing their policies and goals to fruition than those that took a more hard line, less co-operative approach. Councillors regarded informal conversations and meeting opportunities with the mayor as important.

Local authorities are granted "unusually" high levels of financial autonomy; councils are limited in their means of raising revenue, something at least one mayor pointed to as a concern as it can limit their ability to achieve policy goals. Unlike local bodies in other countries, the central government provides a minute fraction of a council's income, with upwards of 80% coming from rates.

Councillors and mayors in New Zealand are not usually affiliated with political parties, leading to challenges with reaching consensus amongst people elected on individual mandates. The intrusion of party politics into local government is commonly seen as distasteful, though there has been a rise of affiliated candidates in Auckland and Christchurch since 2007. A balance must be navigated between the mandate given to the mayor from the public and the political reality of working with a team of disparate people.

Explicit corruption at the local level has not been seen to be a major issue, though the absence of a party structure has been seen as something that could lead to a greater risk of clientelism, with members potentially showing favour to supporters and disfavour to opponents. In a survey, 22% of councillors perceived mayors as using appointments in this way, whereas 17% of mayors said they did so.

It is common for former members of parliament running in local elections to run as independents, despite having been an elected member of a political party and retaining their party membership, leading to concerns over a lack of transparency and credibility.

Mayors face uncertainty in what their role can look like, in part due to central government involvement. Central government has appointed commissioners and other oversight mechanisms in the past when, in their view, a council was not functioning. This ability for central government to be involved has been linked to lessened interest amongst the general populace with local governance.

Mayors are expected to follow a code of conduct.

=== Legislation ===
The principal legislation outlining the formal and constitutional powers and responsibilities of the mayor is the Local Government Act 2002, specifically section 41A.

The mayor is to provide leadership to the councillors and people of the district, and to lead the development of the council's plans and policies. The explicit powers granted to the mayor are the ability to appoint a deputy mayor, the ability to establish council committees and appoint chairpersons to said committees. These powers are limited by councillors' explicit ability to remove the deputy mayor, and to discharge and/or create committees, as well as remove any chairpersons appointed by the mayor. The mayor is an ex officio member of all committees. The mayor cannot delegate any of their powers. If a mayor declines to use their powers to appoint a deputy or a chairperson, the provisions for their election are outlined in clause 17(1) of Schedule 7 and clauses 25 and 26(3) of Schedule 7, respectively.

== Elections ==
Local government elections are held every three years. All mayors are currently elected at-large. News coverage of local elections tends to focus on the mayoral race, with higher profile elections and candidates for the mayoralty leading to higher turnout overall. The majority of elections since 1989 have been via postal voting.

Two electoral systems are used at the local level within New Zealand, first-past-the-post (FPP) and single transferable vote (STV). In FPP, voters pick one candidate and the candidate with the most votes wins, even if they have not achieved a majority. In STV, voters rank the candidates and then preferences are tallied. The candidate with the fewest votes is eliminated and their second preferences are divvied out. This continues until one candidate has a majority. Currently most local councils use FPP. Councils themselves can decide what system they will use at the next election. On average, elections with STV systems saw one additional candidate. Incumbent mayors are more likely to be defeated under STV. Māori candidates for local government positions who were on the Māori electoral roll were less successful than Māori and non-Māori on the general roll, whilst female candidates were more successful than male candidates. Women were under-nominated compared to men for local office relative to their population.

Candidates for mayor must meet the criteria that are required to be met by all local government candidates. These include being a citizen of New Zealand, securing the nominations of two people on the electoral roll within the area, and paying a deposit of $200.

Participation in local government elections has decreased over the past decade, with fewer people voting in subsequent elections. This has led to concerns around the extant to which democracy exists at the local level. The numerous examples of uncontested mayoral elections is seen as a symptom and cause of lowered turnout. There is the perception that local government serves ratepayers, the property-owning class.

The most recent regular triennial elections were held in 2025. Tauranga had a mayoral election in 2024 following a period under commission.

== Remuneration ==
Mayors are paid according to determinations made annually by the Remuneration Authority. Local authorities' pay is calculated using a sizing system devised in 2018. Population and relevant socioeconomic factors are taken into account in determining the size of each council. Auckland Council and Chatham Islands Council are excluded from the system for being too big and too small, respectively. The Remuneration Authority determines a pool for each council, and then the councils themselves determine how it is split between councillors; this can mean that councils that opt for more councillors see less pay per councillor despite being of similar size. Councils are required to spend the full amount within the pool.

The mayor of Auckland is the highest paid in the country, with an annual salary of $296,000; Christchurch and Wellington's mayors made $200,000 and $183,037 (all circa 2024), respectively. The lowest paid mayor was the mayor of Kaikoura, who was paid $86,000.

== Term of office ==
Under the Local Electoral Act 2001, mayors take office the day after the official declaration of results following an election. If they are filling a vacancy they take office on the day of their appointment.

== Demographics ==
There are currently 67 mayors. Mayors (and councillors generally) are disproportionally Pākehā and male. The Human Rights Commission has called the under-representation of Māori in local government "one of the top ten race relations challenges" in the country.

== List of current mayors ==
City / district	Mayor	Affiliation (Note: Per 2025 New Zealand local elections unless indicated otherwise.)	Elected	Population	Salary
Far North District	Moko Tepania	Independent	2022	71,430	$175,324
Whangārei District	Ken Couper	Independent	2025	96,678	$176,195
Kaipara District	Jonathan Larsen	Independent	2025	25,899	$143,702
Auckland	Wayne Brown	Fix Auckland	2022	1,656,486	$318,616
Thames-Coromandel District	Peter Revell	Independent	2022	31,995	$151,976
Hauraki District	Toby Adams	Independent	2019	21,318	$138,830
Waikato District	Aksel Bech	Independent	2025	85,968	$169,037
Matamata-Piako District	Ash Tanner	Independent	2025	37,098	$144,812
Hamilton City	Tim Macindoe	Independent	2025	174,741	$194,113
Waipā District	Mike Pettit	Independent	2025	58,686	$156,499
Ōtorohanga District	Rodney Dow	Independent	2025	10,410	$115,676
South Waikato District	Gary Petley	Independent	2022	25,044	$143,830
Waitomo District	John Robertson	Independent	2019	9,585	$124,708
Taupō District	John Funnell	Independent	2025	40,296	$154,039
Western Bay of Plenty District	James Denyer	Independent	2022	56,184	$156,797
Tauranga City	Mahé Drysdale	Independent	2024	152,844	$186,130
Rotorua District	Tania Tapsell	Independent	2022	74,058	$171,879
Whakatāne District	Nándor Tánczos	Independent Green	2025	37,149	$153,901
Kawerau District	Faylene Tunui	Independent	2022	7,539	$115,440
Ōpōtiki District	David Moore	Independent	2022	10,089	$122,925
Gisborne District	Rehette Stoltz	Independent	2019	51,135	$170,146
Wairoa District	Craig Little	Independent	2013	8,826	$125,917
Hastings District	Wendy Schollum	Independent	2025	85,965	$173,253
Napier City	Richard McGrath	Independent	2025	64,695	$165,646
Central Hawke's Bay District	Will Foley	Independent	2025	15,480	$128,385
New Plymouth District	Max Brough	Independent	2025	87,000	$173,040
Stratford District	Neil Volzke	Independent	2009	10,149	$115,717
South Taranaki District	Phil Nixon	Independent	2019	29,025	$150,646
Ruapehu District	Weston Kirton	Independent	2022	13,095	$129,703
Whanganui District	Andrew Tripe	Independent	2022	47,619	$161,075
Rangitikei District	Andy Watson	Independent	2013	15,663	$129,977
Manawatū District	Michael Ford	Independent	2025	32,415	$142,159
Palmerston North City	Grant Smith	Independent	2015	87,090	$172,563
Tararua District	Scott Gilmore	Independent	2025	18,660	$138,517
Horowhenua District	Bernie Wanden	Independent	2019	36,693	$152,199
Kāpiti Coast District	Janet Holborow	Independent	2022	55,914	$156,712
Porirua City	Anita Baker	Independent	2019	59,445	$163,564
Upper Hutt City	Peri Zee	Independent	2025	45,759	$148,405
Hutt City (Lower Hutt)	Ken Laban	Independent	2025	107,562	$176,580
Wellington City	Andrew Little	Labour	2025	202,689	$197,011
Masterton District	Bex Johnson	Independent	2025	27,678	$143,733
Carterton District	Steve Cretney	Independent	2025	10,107	$108,034
South Wairarapa District	Fran Wilde	Independent	2025	11,811	$113,192
Tasman District	Tim King	Independent	2019	57,807	$168,087
Nelson City	Nick Smith	Independent	2022	52,584	$161,363
Marlborough District	Nadine Taylor	Independent	2022	49,431	$161,363
Buller District	Chris Russell	Independent	2019	4,215	$124,579
Grey District	Tania Gibson	Independent	2019	10,446	$125,537
Westland District	Helen Lash	Independent	2022	14,043	$113,209
Kaikōura District	Craig Mackle	Independent	2019	8,901	$92,571
Hurunui District	Marie Black	Independent	2019	13,608	$121,782
Waimakariri District	Dan Gordon	Independent	2019	66,246	$158,057
Christchurch City	Phil Mauger	Independent	2022	391,383	$215,281
Selwyn District	Lydia Gliddon	Independent	2025	78,144	$158,082
Ashburton District	Liz McMillan	Independent	2019	34,746	$142,829
Timaru District	Nigel Bowen	Independent	2019	47,547	$151,976
Mackenzie District	Scott Aronsen	Independent	2025	5,115	$95,492
Waimate District	Craig Rowley	Independent	2013	8,121	$112,271
Waitaki District	Mel Tavendale	Independent	2025	23,472	$138,901
Central Otago District	Tamah Alley	Independent	2024	24,306	$130,074
Queenstown-Lakes District	John Glover	Independent	2025	47,808	$154,716
Dunedin City	Sophie Barker	Independent	2025	128,901	$185,549
Clutha District	Jock Martin	Independent	2025	18,315	$134,162
Southland District	Rob Scott	Independent	2022	31,833	$145,222
Gore District	Ben Bell	Independent	2022	12,711	$120,568
Invercargill City	Tom Campbell	Independent	2025	55,599	$160,698
Chatham Islands	Greg Horler	Independent	2025	612	$61,794

=== Affiliations ===
The vast majority of mayors were elected as independents, with the exceptions being Wayne Brown (Fix Auckland) in Auckland, Nándor Tánczos (Independent Green) in Whakatāne and Andrew Little (Labour) in Wellington.

Affiliation of mayors

Affiliation
Independent (64)
Fix Auckland (1)
Independent Green (1)
Labour (1)

== Notable mayors ==
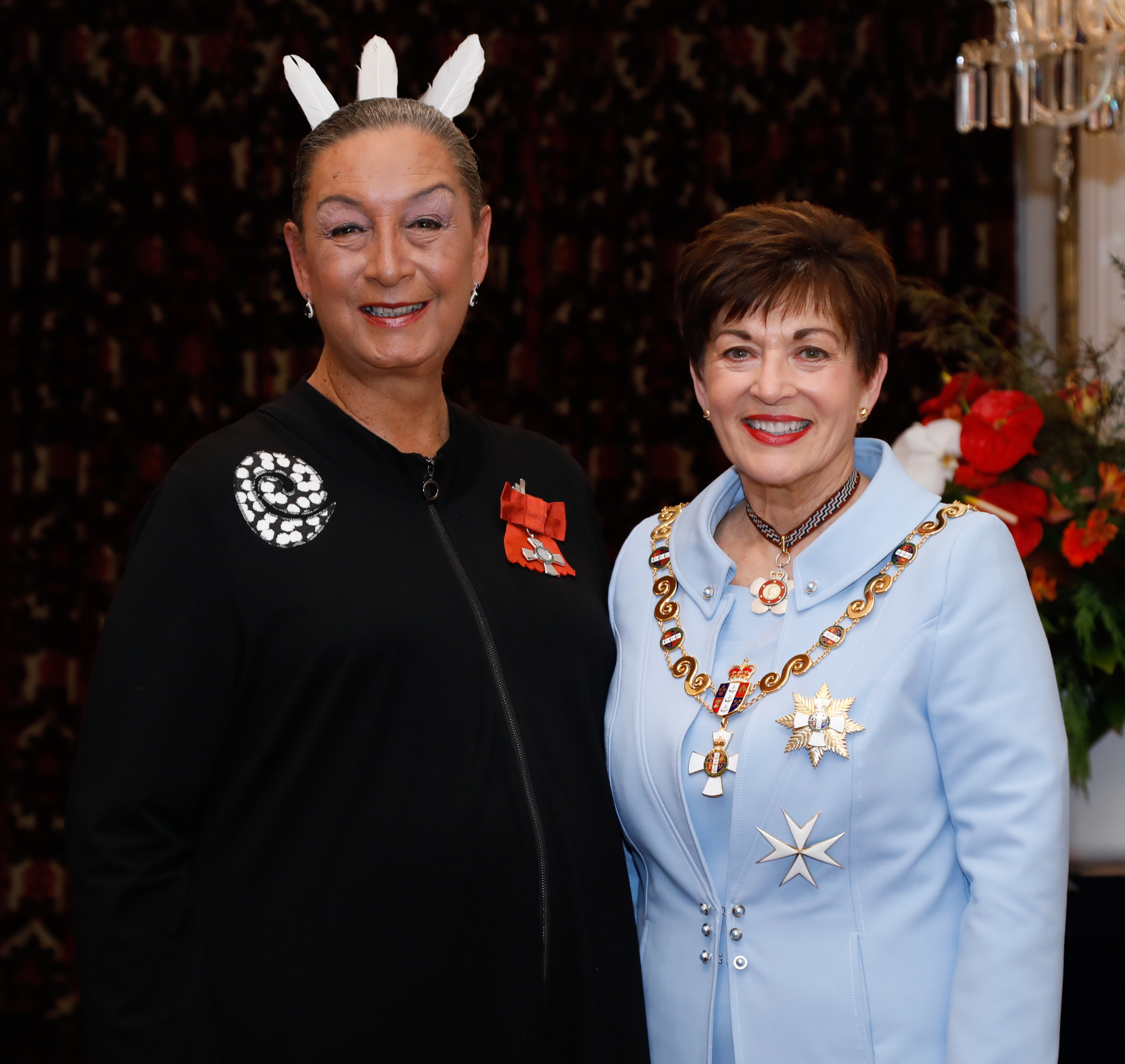
Beyer with then Governor-General, Patsy Reddy, in 2020.

=== Georgina Beyer ===
Beyer (1957–2023) was the world's first openly transgender mayor. First elected to the Carterton District Council in 1993, she went on to win the mayoral elections of 1995 and 1998. She was later the Labour MP for Wairarapa from 1999 to 2005, and then a List MP until she retired in 2007.

=== Charles Mackay ===
Mackay (1875–1929) was mayor of Whanganui and a convicted attempted-murderer. In 1920, Mackay shot Walter D'Arcy Cresswell, after Cresswell allegedly threatened to out Mackay as a homosexual following alleged advances by Mackay towards Cresswell.

=== Percy Murphy ===
Murphy (1924–2009) was the country's first Māori mayor. His iwi was Ngāti Manawa and he was their last surviving member who served as a soldier in the 28th Māori Battalion, having enlisted at the age of 16. He served on the Murupara Borough Council and then was the mayor of Murupara from 1960 to 1969. He was very involved with his iwi and his marae after being mayor.

=== Tim Shadbolt ===
Shadbolt (1947–2026) was one of the country's longest-serving mayors and a national icon. He served for eight terms as mayor of Invercargill, almost continuously since first being elected in 1993. He was also previously mayor of Waitemata. He failed to win re-election in 2022.

=== Elizabeth Yates ===
Yates (1840–1918) was the first female mayor in the British Empire. After her husband stood down as mayor of Onehunga, she was nominated for the office and then stood in and won the 1893 mayoral election against only one other opponent. She received congratulations from Premier Richard Seddon and Queen Victoria. She lost the subsequent 1894 election, serving less than a year.

== See also ==
- Elections in New Zealand
- Local government in New Zealand
- Mayor–council government

== Sources ==
- Asquith, Andy; Webster, Karen; Cardow, Andrew (28 June 2021). "Voting in New Zealand local government elections: the need to encourage greater voter turnout". Commonwealth Journal of Local Governance (24): 79–97. doi:10.5130/cjlg.vi24.7541. hdl:10292/14725.
- Drage, Jean (2002). Empowering Communities? Representation and Participation in New Zealand's Local Government. Wellington: Victoria University Press. ISBN 9780864734372.
- Local Government Act 2002.
- Mahoney, Seán (25 November 2021). "Leading Locally: How New Zealand's mayors get things done". Policy Quarterly. 17 (4): 80–86. doi:10.26686/pq.v17i4.7324.
- Vowles, Jack; Hayward, Janine (September 2021). "Ballot structure, district magnitude and descriptive representation: the case of New Zealand local council elections". Australian Journal of Political Science. 56 (3): 225–244. doi:10.1080/10361146.2021.1935449. ISSN 1036-1146.
