= Kaipara District Council =

Territorial authority of New Zealand

Coordinates: 35.9405393°S 173.8643427°E

Kaipara District Council Kaunihera o Kaipara

History
- Founded: 1 November 1989

Leadership
- Mayor: Jonathan Larsen
- Deputy mayor: Gordon Lambeth

Structure
- Seats: 9 seats (1 mayor, 8 ward seats)
- Political groups: Independent (9)
- Length of term: 3 years

Elections
- Last election: 2025
- Next election: 2028

Meeting place
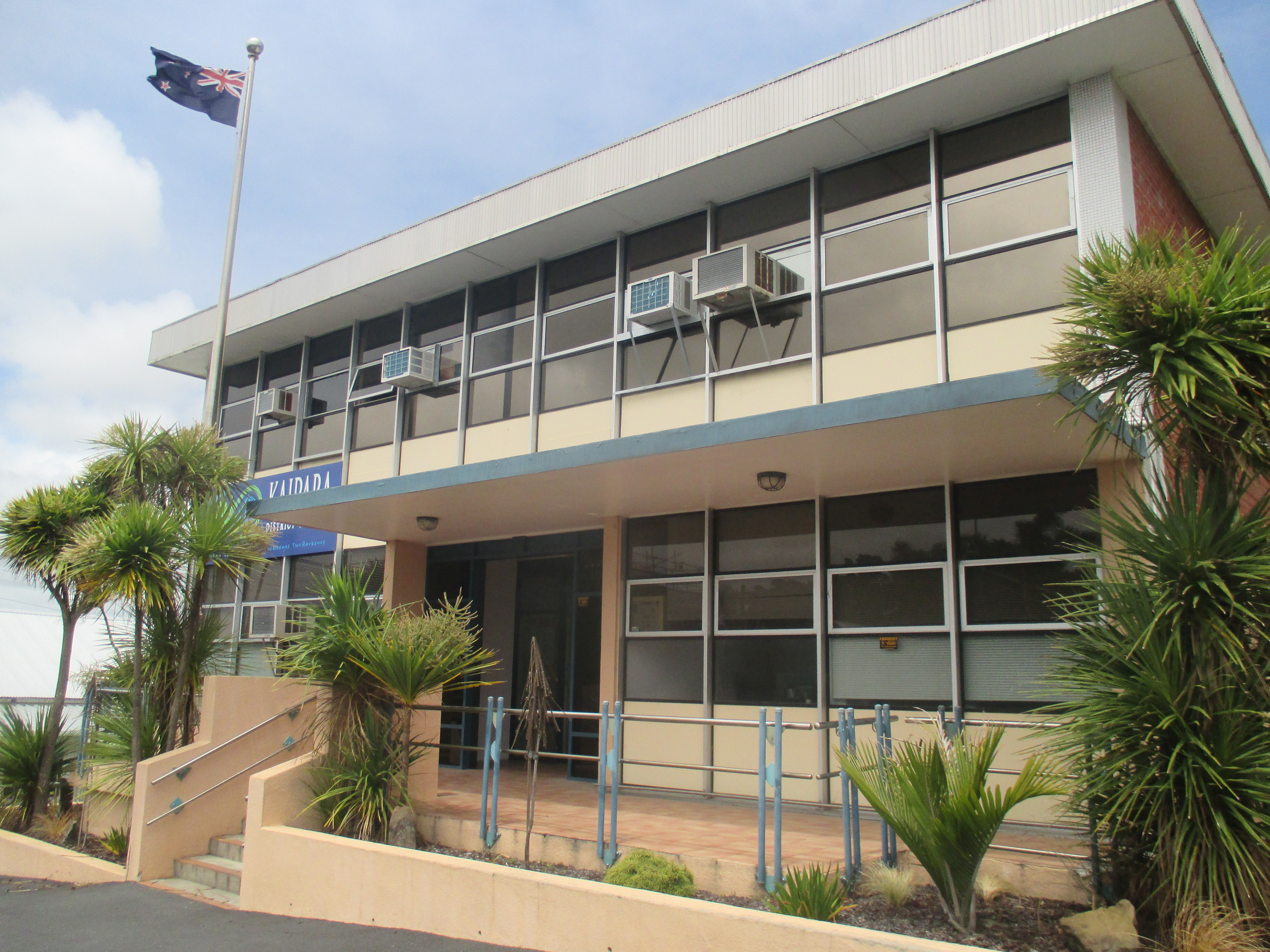
- Kaipara District Council Building, Dargaville

Website
- kaipara.govt.nz

Kaipara District Council (Māori: Kaunihera o Kaipara) is the territorial authority for the Kaipara District of New Zealand's North Island. It serves as the district's local government, with the Northland Regional Council serving as the regional authority. It has existed since the 1989 reforms to local government.

The council has 8 councillors and is chaired by the mayor of Kaipara (currently Jonathan Larsen since 2025).

== Composition ==
The council is led by the mayor of Kaipara, elected at-large. There are also eight ward councillors.

=== Current council ===
The present council was elected in the 2025 local elections:

Kaipara District Council, 2025–2028
Position	Name	Ward	Affiliation
Mayor	Jonathan Larsen	At-large	Independent
Deputy mayor	Gordon Lambeth	Wairoa	Independent
Councillor	Joesephine Nathan	Wairoa	Independent
Councillor	Snow Tane	Wairoa	Independent
Councillor	Denise Rogers	Otamatea	Independent
Councillor	Mike Schimanski	Otamatea	Independent
Councillor	Luke Canton	Kaiwaka-Mangawhai	Independent
Councillor	Craig Jepson	Kaiwaka-Mangawhai	Independent
Councillor	Rachael Williams	Kaiwaka-Mangawhai	Independent

== History ==
Kaipara District Council was founded through the 1989 New Zealand local government reforms and was constituted on 1 November 1989. It was formed from the councils of five former boroughs and counties, representing all of Hobson County, Dargaville Borough, Otamatea County, and parts of Rodney County and Whangarei County. In addition, it took over the functions of the Raupo Drainage Board, Kaiwaka Reserve Board, and the Pahi Reserve Boards.

A review team put in place by the Minister of Local Government in June 2012 found that the council faced financial management and governance challenges that were beyond the ability of the mayor and councillors to manage. The elected council agreed and asked the minister to appoint commissioners to take over governance of the council. The minister appointed John Robertson (chairman), Richard Booth, Colin Dale and Peter Winder as the commissioners on 6 September 2012.

In 2016, a new Kaipara District Council was elected, with Peter Winder guiding the council as Crown manager. In 2019, the council returned to full self-management.

Kaipara District was divided into the three wards of West Coast-Central, Dargaville and Otamatea for the 2016 election. A fourth ward of Kaiwaka-Mangawhai was added for the 2019 election. For the 2022 New Zealand local elections, Kaipara District Council voted to establish a Māori ward. For that election, the West Coast-Central and Dargaville Wards merged to form Wairoa Ward, and the Māori ward of Te Moananui o Kaipara was created. Pera Paniora was elected as councillor for the Māori ward. On 7 August 2024, the Council voted to dissolve the Māori ward, rather than hold a binding referendum on it alongside the 2025 New Zealand local elections.

== Elections ==
- 1989
- 1992
- 1995
- 1998
- 2001
- 2004
- 2007
- 2010
- 2013
- 2016
- 2019
- 2022
- 2025
