= Mayor of Kaipara =

Head of New Zealand's Kaipara District

- Incumbent; Jonathan Larsen since 2025
- Style: His/Her Worship
- Seat: Dargaville
- Term length: 3 years, renewable
- Formation: 1989
- First holder: Peter Brown
- Salary: $133,501
- Website: Official website

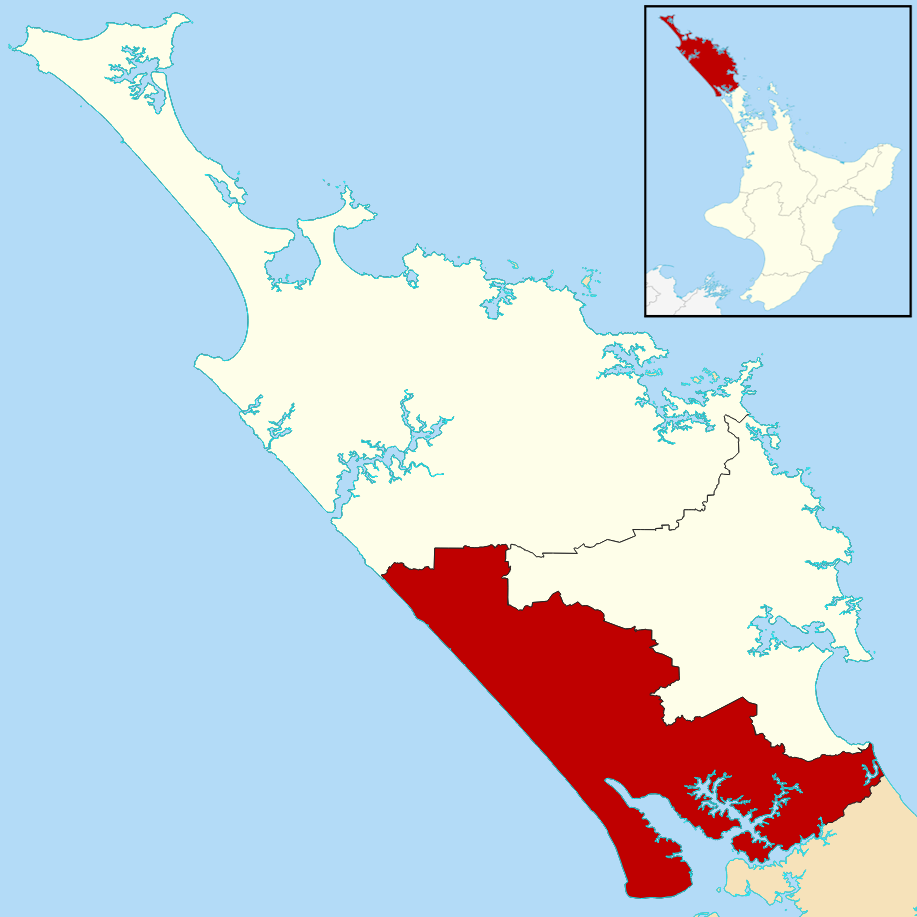
Map of the Kaipara District within Northland

The mayor of Kaipara is the elected head of local government in the Kaipara District of New Zealand's North Island; one of 67 mayors in the country. The main town of the district is Dargaville. The mayor presides over the Kaipara District Council and is directly elected using the single transferable vote method.

The current mayor is Jonathan Larsen, first elected in October 2025 during that year's local elections.

== History ==
Kaipara District was formed through the 1989 New Zealand local government reforms.

Graeme Ramsey was Mayor from 1998 to 2004.

In 2012, the district council was sacked by the government and replaced with commissioners over a proposed 31 per cent increase in rates to cover the costs of the Mangawhai Community Wastewater Scheme. Some component of local democracy was restored for the 2016 local elections and full self-management was granted from the 2019 local elections onwards.

Greg Gent was elected Mayor during the 8 October 2016 local elections. He took office in November 2016 but resigned suddenly after one year and one day effective November 2017. The Deputy Mayor, Peter Wethey, became Acting Mayor after Gent's departure and before the resulting by-election. Sheep and beef farmer Jason Smith was elected Mayor following a by-election in February 2018. He declined to stand for re-election during the 2022 local elections.

During the 2022 local elections, Craig Jepson was elected as Mayor of Kaipara. Jepson stood on the Democracy Northland ticket and campaigned on fixing roads, infrastructural investment, and opposing the Government's Three Waters reform programme and co-governance policies such as the Māori wards and constituencies. In late October, Jepson appointed councillor Jonathan Larsen as Deputy Mayor. In late November 2022, Jepson attracted media attention after interrupting Māori ward councillor Pera Paniora's karakia (Māori prayer). He subsequently banned karakia from council meetings on the grounds that specific religions or cultures should not be included in secular meetings.

Jonathan Larsen won the mayoralty in 2025 in a narrow three-candidate race. A recount confirmed his win.

== List of mayors ==
The following table is a complete list of the mayors of Kaipara since the district's formation in 1989.

	Mayor	Affiliation	Term	Deputy	Affiliation	Term
1	Peter Brown	?	1989–1998		?	
2	Graeme Ramsey	?	1998–2004		?	
3	Peter King	?	2004–2007		?	
4	Neil Tiller	?	2007–2012		?	
–	John Robertson (as chair of commissioners)	–	2012–2016		?	
5	Greg Gent	?	2016–2017		?	
6	Jason Smith	None	2018–2022	Anna Curnow	None	2019–2022
7	Craig Jepson	None	2022–2025	Jonathan Larsen	Independent	2022–2025
8	Jonathan Larsen	Independent	2025–present	TBD		
