= State Highway 12 (New Zealand) =

Road in New Zealand

State Highway 12

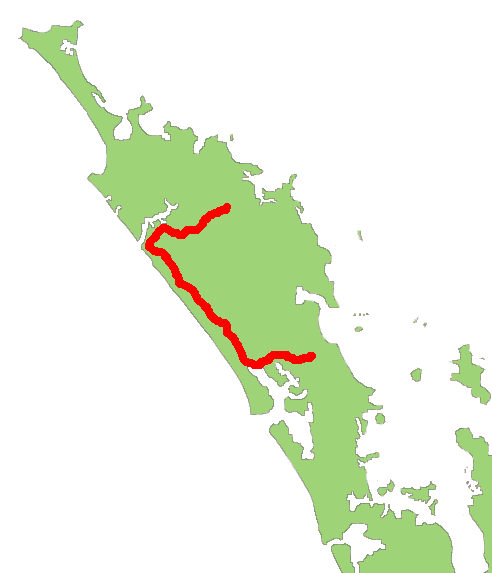

Route information
- Maintained by NZ Transport Agency Waka Kotahi
- Length: 217 km (135 mi)

Major junctions
- North end: SH 1 at Ōhaeawai
- SH 15 north (Te Pua Road) near Kaikohe; SH 15 south (Mangakahia Road) at Kaikohe; SH 14 (Jervois Street) at Dargaville
- South end: SH 1 at Brynderwyn

Location
- Country: New Zealand
- Primary destinations: Dargaville, Kaikohe, Hokianga Harbour

Highway system
- New Zealand state highways; Motorways and expressways; List
← SH 11	→ SH 14

State Highway 12 (SH 12) is a New Zealand state highway in the far north of the North Island. It connects with SH 1 at both its northern and southern end. It runs close to the west coast of the Northland Region of New Zealand.

== Route ==
SH 12 starts in Ōhaeawai, running initially southwest to Kaikohe, during which it shares a short section of road with SH 15. It then turns roughly westwards, reaching the Hokianga harbour at its Omanaia River arm. It continues west, reaching Opononi and Ōmāpere at the mouth of the harbour, before turning southeast to parallel the coast. The highway briefly follows the valley of the Waimamaku River before winding through the Waipoua Kauri Forest, then follows the valley of the Kaihu River to Dargaville. At Dargaville, the highway meets SH 14, and continues southeastwards along the edge of the Wairoa River to Ruawai before turning eastwards. It briefly skirts the edge of the Arapaoa River arm of the Kaipara Harbour before passing through Paparoa and Maungaturoto and ending at its junction with SH 1 at Brynderwyn, 15 km (9.3 mi) south of Waipu.

== Major intersections ==
Territorial authority	Location	km	mi	Destinations	Notes
Far North District	Ohaeawai	0	0.0	SH 1 north – Kaitaia, Cape Reinga; SH 1 south – Whangārei	SH 12 begins 35°21′07″S 173°52′55″E
Far North District	Kaikohe	8.7	5.4	SH 15 (Te Pua Road) – Okaihau, Kaitaia	SH 12/SH 15 concurrency begins
Far North District	Kaikohe	10.3	6.4	SH 15 (Mangakahia Road) – Maungatapere, Dargaville (via Murray Road)	SH 12/SH 15 concurrency ends
Kaipara District	Dargaville	142	88	River Road – Te Kōpuru, Pouto	
Kaipara District	Dargaville	144.7	89.9	SH 14 - Whangārei	
Kaipara District	Brynderwyn	214.3	133.2	SH 1 north – Whangārei; SH 1 south – Auckland	SH 12 ends 36°05′49″S 174°25′49″E
Concurrency terminus
