= Lake Rotokawau =

Lake Rotokawau is the name of numerous lakes in New Zealand:

- Lake Rotokawau (Aupouri Peninsula), Northland
- Lake Rotokawau (Karikari Peninsula), Northland
- Lake Rotokawau (Kaipara), Northland
- Lake Rotokawau (Waikato)
- Lake Rotokawau (Bay of Plenty)
- Lake Rotokawau (Chatham Islands)

== See also ==
- Lake Rotokauwau
