= Tangowahine =

- Interactive map of Tangowahine
- Coordinates: 35°52′6″S 173°55′58″E
- Country: New Zealand
- Region: Northland Region
- District: Kaipara District
- Ward: West Coast-Central Ward
- Electorates: Northland; Te Tai Tokerau

Government
  - Territorial Authority: Kaipara District Council
  - Regional council: Northland Regional Council
  - Mayor of Kaipara: Jonathan Larsen
  - Northland MP: Grant McCallum
  - Te Tai Tokerau MP: Mariameno Kapa-Kingi

Tangowahine is a community on the northern Kaipara Harbour in Northland, New Zealand. The Tangowahine Stream flows from the Tutamoe Range east and then south to join the Wairoa River at Tangowahine. State Highway 14 passes through Tangowahine. Dargaville is 12 km to the south west, and Tangiteroria is 15 km north east.

== History ==
A bridge was built over the Tangowahine River in 1893–1895, to allow a road from Dargaville to Tangiteroria to be completed.

Tangowahine was a mill town for the kahikatea and kauri timber trade. Robert Gibbon's mill was built around 1900 and included electric lighting. Steamers loaded timber at the town's two wharves. The S.S. Matarere ran a passenger service. The population was 402 in about 1910. The mill was rebuilt after a fire in 1916, and closed in 1931. Gum-diggers also operated in the area in the early 20th century.

From January 1931, Tangowahine was the terminus for the railway line. In 1940, the line was extended to Dargaville.

== Demographics ==
Tangowahine is in an SA1 statistical area which covers 32.82 km^{2} (12.67 sq mi). The SA1 area is part of the larger Maungaru statistical area.

Historical population
Year	Pop.	±% p.a.
2006	108	—
2013	129	+2.57%
2018	147	+2.65%
2023	144	−0.41%

The SA1 statistical area had a population of 144 in the 2023 New Zealand census, a decrease of 3 people (−2.0%) since the 2018 census, and an increase of 15 people (11.6%) since the 2013 census. There were 69 males and 75 females in 48 dwellings. 2.1% of people identified as LGBTIQ+. The median age was 43.7 years (compared with 38.1 years nationally). There were 33 people (22.9%) aged under 15 years, 21 (14.6%) aged 15 to 29, 63 (43.8%) aged 30 to 64, and 24 (16.7%) aged 65 or older.

People could identify as more than one ethnicity. The results were 85.4% European (Pākehā), 35.4% Māori, 2.1% Pasifika, and 2.1% Asian. English was spoken by 97.9%, Māori language by 6.2%, and other languages by 2.1%. No language could be spoken by 4.2% (e.g. too young to talk). The percentage of people born overseas was 10.4, compared with 28.8% nationally.

Religious affiliations were 27.1% Christian, 2.1% Māori religious beliefs, and 4.2% other religions. People who answered that they had no religion were 58.3%, and 10.4% of people did not answer the census question.

Of those at least 15 years old, 6 (5.4%) people had a bachelor's or higher degree, 57 (51.4%) had a post-high school certificate or diploma, and 39 (35.1%) people exclusively held high school qualifications. The median income was $34,200, compared with $41,500 nationally. 12 people (10.8%) earned over $100,000 compared to 12.1% nationally. The employment status of those at least 15 was that 54 (48.6%) people were employed full-time and 21 (18.9%) were part-time.

== Education ==
Tangowahine School is a coeducational full primary (years 1-8) school with a roll of 15 students as of March 2026.
