= State Highway 15 (New Zealand) =

Road in New Zealand

State Highway 15

Route information
- Maintained by NZ Transport Agency
- Length: 126.5 km (78.6 mi)

Major junctions
- Northwest end: SH 1 between Ōkaihau and Ōhaeawai
- SH 12 north near Kaikohe; SH 12 south (Broadway) at Kaikohe; SH 14 at Maungatapere; SH 1 north near Portland; SH 1 south near Ruakaka
- Southeast end: Marsden Point

Location
- Country: New Zealand

Highway system
- New Zealand state highways; Motorways and expressways; List
← SH 14	→ SH 16

State Highway 15 (SH 15) is a New Zealand state highway in the Northland region of the North Island. It is 126.5 km (78.6 mi) long and provides an alternative route to SH 1 between the Kaikohe and Whangārei areas; a spur also links SH 1 with the Marsden Point Oil Refinery and Northport.

== History ==
Prior to 1930, the recommended route by the Automobile Association, from Whangārei to Kaitaia was via Mangakahia and was named Highway 1. Approximately 90 years later a formal designation has been re-instated. The current SH 1 south of Kawakawa was only a rough clay road in the 1920s. Also known as the Northland Inland Freight Route it was declared a state highway in August 2016. Formerly administered by the Far North District Council and Whangarei District Council, in May 2015 the NZ Transport Agency agreed to include it to the state highway network after lobbying from the local authorities and industries given its significance to the regional forestry industry and its connectivity to the regions port near Marsden Point. Of the newly declared state highway, 96 km is former council administered roads, 8.5 km was from the former SH 15A and the remainder shared as concurrencies with SH 1, SH 12 and SH 14.

== Route ==
State Highway 15 commences at SH 1 near Ōkaihau. It follows Te Pua Road for 7.4 km (4.6 mi) before intersecting SH 12 and turns west, where it shares a concurrency for approximately 2 km (1.2 mi) into the town of Kaikohe. SH 15 then turns south at Mangakahia Road where it travels on mostly rural road through forestry, changing orientation from a south to a southeast direction, for approximately 70 km (43 mi) where it intersects SH 14 at Maungatapere. It shares a very brief concurrency of 35 m (38 yd) with SH 14 and then leaves it to continue southeast on Otaika Valley Road for approximately 10 km (6.2 mi) where it ends at Loop Road where a short connection of the northern part of Loop Road meets SH 1.

From this point SH 15 shares a concurrency with SH 1 southbound for approximately 20 km (12 mi) where it arrives at the Ruakaka roundabout. The last 8.5 km (5.3 mi) section of SH 15 after leaving SH 1 is part of the former SH 15A spur which was renamed as part of the new declaration. This highway travels northeast along Port Marsden Highway, terminating at the entrances of Northport and Marsden Point Oil Refinery. The first 3 km (1.9 mi) of this section of highway runs along the route formerly taken by the southern end of One Tree Point Road, which was significantly realigned as part of its upgrade to highway status. The next 3 km (1.9 mi) of the highway uses a section of road which was newly built as part of the creation of the highway, whilst the final 2.5 km (1.6 mi) uses an existing road which was formerly the northern end of Marsden Point Road.

== Former routes ==
=== Former SH 15 ===
The first designation of SH 15 was declared in 1997, but its highway status was revoked in 2003. SH 15 was 4.5 km (2.8 mi) long and connected SH 1 with Port Whangārei. The highway started at a junction with SH 1 in the suburb of Raumanga, and ran along Rewa Rewa Road, Kioreroa Road and Port Road before terminating at the entrance to Port Whangārei. The route had its highway status revoked in December 2003, as part of the closure of Port Whangārei to commercial shipping and the opening of Northport at Marsden Point. Six months later, in June 2004, SH 15A was gazetted to provide a highway link to the new port facilities at Marsden Point.

=== Former SH 15A ===
State Highway 15A
- Location: Ruakaka to Marsden Point
- Length: 8.5 km (5.3 mi)
- Existed: 2016

SH 15A was a former state highway which is now part of the southeastern spur of SH 15 connecting SH 1 near Ruakaka to Marsden Point. For many years 15A was a peculiarity since there wasn't any corresponding SH 15. This is because the original SH 15, which used to connect SH 1 with the former site of Port Whangārei, had its highway designation revoked in December 2003. SH 15A was created six months later, in June 2004, to provide a highway connection to the new site of the port at Marsden Point.

== Major intersections ==
Territorial authority	Location	km	mi	Destinations	Notes
Far North District	between Ōkaihau and Ōhaeawai	0	0.0	SH 1 north – Kaitaia, Cape Reinga; SH 1 south – Whangārei	SH 15 begins 35°20′15″S 173°49′41″E
Far North District	Kaikohe	7.4	4.6	SH 12 west – Ohaeawai	SH 12/SH 15 concurrency begins
Far North District	Kaikohe	9	5.6	SH 12 east (Broadway) – Dargaville	SH 12/SH 15 concurrency ends
Whangarei District	Maungatapere	80.5	50.0	SH 14 east – Whangārei	SH 14/SH 15 concurrency begins
Whangarei District	Maungatapere	80.57	50.06	SH 14 west – Dargaville	SH 14/SH 15 concurrency ends
Whangarei District	Otaika	91	57	SH 1 north – Whangārei	SH 15/SH 1 concurrency begins
Whangarei District	Ruakākā	118	73	SH 1 south – Auckland	SH 15/SH 1 concurrency ends
Whangarei District	Marsden Point	126.5	78.6	Marsden Point Oil Refinery, Northport	SH 15 ends 35°50′21″S 174°29′11″E
Concurrency terminus

== See also ==
- List of New Zealand state highways
