= State Highway 14 (New Zealand) =

Road in New Zealand

State Highway 14

Route information
- Maintained by NZ Transport Agency Waka Kotahi
- Length: 54.6 km (33.9 mi)

Major junctions
- East end: SH 1 (Western Hills Drive/Otaika Road) at Whangārei
- SH 15 (Mangakahia Road/Otaika Valley Road) at Maungatapere
- West end: SH 12 (Jervois Street/Grey Street) at Dargaville

Location
- Country: New Zealand
- Primary destinations: Whangārei, Dargaville

Highway system
- New Zealand state highways; Motorways and expressways; List
← SH 12	→ SH 15

State Highway 14 (SH 14) is a New Zealand state highway in the north of the North Island. It forms an east to west connection between SH 1 and SH 12. It runs from Whangārei to Dargaville in the Northland Region of New Zealand.

== Route ==
SH 14 starts in Whangārei, running initially west to Horahora and Maunu before turning southwest, reaching Maungatapere – there it meets SH 15, with which it shares a brief concurrency of 35 m (38 yd). It then runs southwestwards via Tangiteroria and beside the Waiotama and Northern Wairoa rivers, before reaching Dargaville. SH 14 terminates at a junction with SH 12 in Dargaville, at the intersection of Jervois Street and Grey Street.

== Major intersections ==
Territorial authority	Location	km	mi	Destinations	Notes
Whangarei District	Whangārei	0	0.0	SH 1 north (Western Hills Drive) – Cape Reinga; SH 1 south (Otaika Road) – Auckland	SH 14 begins 35°43′56″S 174°18′35″E
Whangarei District	Maungatapere	10.7	6.6	SH 15 south (Otaika Valley Road) – Otaika	SH 14/SH 15 concurrency begins
Whangarei District	Maungatapere	10.73	6.67	SH 15 north (Mangakahia Road) – Kaikohe	SH 14/SH 15 concurrency ends
Kaipara District	Dargaville	54.6	33.9	SH 12 south (Jervois Street) – Kaikohe, Ohaeawai; SH 12 north (Grey Street) – Brynderwyn, Auckland	SH 14 ends 35°56′04″S 173°52′51″E
Concurrency terminus
