= Kendrick Smithyman =

New Zealand poet (1922–1995)

Kendrick Smithyman OBE
- Born: William Kendrick Smithyman; 9 October 1922; Te Kōpuru, New Zealand
- Died: 28 December 1995 (aged 73); Auckland, New Zealand
- Occupation: Poet
- Spouses: Mary Isobel Stanley (m. 1946; died 1980); Margaret Ann Edgcumbe (m. 1981)
- Writing career
- Period: 1944–1995

William Kendrick Smithyman OBE (9 October 1922 – 28 December 1995) was a New Zealand poet and one of the most prolific of that nation's poets in the 20th century.

== Family and early life ==
Smithyman was born in Te Kōpuru, a milling and logging town on the Wairoa River near Dargaville, in the Northland Region in the far north of New Zealand. He was the only child of William "Bill" Kendrick Smithyman, an immigrant from England and a former soldier who had fought both in the Boer War and World War I and who had radical political sympathies. Before World War I, he had worked in sugar plantations in Fiji. The poet's father had also been a sailor and waterside worker but fell on hard times during the Depression when the poet was growing up. The father at some points had to work on relief gangs to earn money. His wife, Annie Lavinia Evans, was born in Christchurch. His parents managed a home for elderly men in Te Kōpuru before moving to Auckland in the early 1930s. Some of Smithyman's poems, especially in Imperial Vistas Family Fictions (written in 1983-1984 and posthumously published in 2002) are about his father and other relatives from previous generations whom Smithyman had never met, including his grandfather, also named William Kendrick, born in 1829, who became a sailor, fought for the British Royal Navy in the Crimean War, travelled to Australia and India, then became harbourmaster at Ramsgate on the southeast coast of England.

The family moved to several communities in and around Auckland before settling on Boscawen Avenue in Point Chevalier, where the lonely boy read voraciously and attended Point Chevalier Primary School. There he became a lifelong friend of future poet and historian Keith Sinclair. Smithyman also attended Seddon Memorial Technical College (1935–1939) and Auckland Teachers' Training College (1940–1941), from which he earned a teacher's certificate. There his first stories and poems were published in the college magazine, Manuka, edited by Robert William Lowry, who later became Smithyman's first publisher.

In World War II, Smithyman served in the New Zealand Army artillery as bombardier (1941–1942), then as a quartermaster in the Royal New Zealand Air Force from 1942 to 1945. His service in the armed services was spent in New Zealand except for a short period in 1945 when he was stationed on Norfolk Island, resulting in Considerations, a sequence of poems later published in Landfall and after that in the 1951 edition of Allen Curnow's Book of New Zealand Verse 1923–1950.

== Career ==
By 1944, his poetry started appearing regularly in journals in New Zealand, Australia, Britain and the United States, quickly establishing his reputation in New Zealand as one of the leading poets of the nation's post-war generation. This status was confirmed by his inclusion in A Book of New Zealand Verse, 1923–50 (1951), edited by Allen Curnow. Thereafter, Smithyman's poetry made it into all significant anthologies of New Zealand poetry.

Smithyman was closely associated with other writers in Auckland, such as Robert Chapman, Maurice Duggan and Keith Sinclair.

In August 1946, at Auckland, Smithyman married the poet Mary Isobel Stanley (née Neal; 1919–1980), whose first husband had been killed in the war. The couple had three sons. He dedicated his first books, Seven Sonnets (1946) and The Blind Mountain & Other Poems (1950) to her. In 1949 the couple moved to Pine Island (now known as Herald Island) in the Waitemata Harbour. Both poets wrote about this time on the Island where they were living in a remote environment, only accessible by boat. From 1946 to 1963 he was a primary and intermediate teacher at various schools in the Auckland area, where he specialised in teaching children with learning difficulties. In lectures and articles he promoted special education for psychologically impaired and high-achieving children, and the training of special-education teachers. Smithyman also attended Auckland University College sporadically, as a part-time student, but did not stay to get a degree. When the Education Department refused to allow him a leave of absence to work on a book of literary criticism, he resigned his position in 1963 and that year took up a teaching position as a tutor of English at the University of Auckland. From 1964 to 1965 he also edited and presented a radio programme, Perspective: A Programme of Critical Writing

Intellectually curious and widely read, Smithyman assimilated a wide range of poetic influences, especially post-war Anglo-American modernism. The English poets T. S. Eliot, W. H. Auden, Dylan Thomas and Americans John Crowe Ransom, Allen Tate, Robert Lowell and Marianne Moore were all influences. He initially avoided some of the preoccupations of earlier New Zealand poets with landscape and colonial history. He was also fascinated by 17th-century poets, especially John Donne. At this time Smithyman wrote ironic, anti-Romantic love poetry thick with syntactical complexity, dense argument, and many references. "[H]is poetry, above all, was academic in style. Smithyman's verse was notorious for its knotty language and allusive obscurity." Many of the poems from this period were eventually collected in Inheritance (1962) and Flying to Palmerston (1968).

The early 1960s he spent less effort on poetry and more on literary criticism, notably A Way of Saying: A Study of New Zealand Poetry (1965). The book's description of the aesthetics and practice of Auckland poets, whose work he dubbed "academic" (including M. K. Joseph, Keith Sinclair, Mary Stanley, C. K. Stead, and the later work of Allen Curnow), also provided insights into his own outlook and poems. "This idiosyncratic book – the first full-length study of the subject – analysed the Romantic affiliations of earlier New Zealand poets, and pointed to subtle regional differences (especially between Auckland and Wellington poets) in his own generation," according to Peter Simpson.

== A change in style ==
From 1960 to 1965, Smithyman stopped writing poetry. Smithyman's poetry changed in style at some point or points in the 1960s or very early 1970s, although critics differ as to when the new style started appearing, and they can't pin down the cause. According to Ian Richards, the poem "Flying to Palmerston", which Smithyman wrote in an airport lounge in 1966 and which later became the title piece for the 1968 book, "signalled a new start in a new manner" in the poet's verse. "There is critical consensus that between this poem and his next collection, Earthquake Weather, in 1972, Smithyman's mature style emerged."

Smithyman was promoted to senior tutor at the University of Auckland in 1966, and he held the post until 1987. A six-month stay in 1969 at the University of Leeds as a visiting fellow in Commonwealth literature resulted in travel in Britain and North America, which stimulated many poems. On returning home in 1970, his poetry engaged the landscapes, history and people of his native Northland, as seen in Earthquake Weather, as well as The Seal in the Dolphin Pool (1974), and Dwarf With a Billiard Cue (1978). "Whatever the biographical reasons (travel, maturity, a grown-up family) the next book, Earthquake Weather (1972) is a different kind of book, more like the four volumes that have followed than anything previous", Murray Edmund wrote in 1988. Some of these works became his most admired verse and are his most anthologized poems, including "An Ordinary Day Beyond Kaitaia", "Tomarata", and "Reading the Maps: An Academic Exercise".

Although Smithyman initially seemed to shy away from writing poems about the landscape, he did write some even in his earliest years ("The Bay 1942", "Bream Bay"), and he turned to that subject in some of his later poems. He wrote about his 1969 travels in North America and Britain in 1969 and about his trip to Canada in 1981. Concerning New Zealand, he wrote about Coromandel ("Colville" and "Where Waikawau Stream Comes Out"), Auckland ("About Setting a Jar on a Hill"), the coast around Pirongia ("Bird Bay", "Below Karioi"), and other areas in the Central North Island ("In the Sticks", "Tokaanu"). Northland came up in his writing quite a bit, with verses about Puhoi, Waipu, Kaitaia, and the area around Dargaville where he grew up. The Bay of Islands and Hokianga sites were mentioned in his posthumous book, Atua Wera.

== Later career ==
In 1980 Smithyman's wife died after a long illness, and in January 1981 at Auckland he married Margaret Ann Edgcumbe, like himself a university tutor. Participation that year in the Harbourfront Literary Festival in Toronto, Ontario, Canada was fruitful in generating many poems.

In 1986 he was awarded an honorary LittD by the University of Auckland, and he won the New Zealand Book Awards for poetry for Stories About Wooden Keyboards (1985). The poems in that volume were more accessible to the general reader than his previous books and tended to use more narrative, anecdote and comedy. This vein in his poetry continued with Are You Going to the Pictures? (1987) and Auto/biographies (1992). He revised many earlier poems in significant ways for his Selected Poems (1989).

Smithyman's other writing in his final years included essays on New Zealand philology and critical editions of novels by William Satchell and the stories of Greville Texidor. He was appointed an Officer of the Order of the British Empire, for services to literature, in the 1990 New Year Honours. He died in December 1995 at North Shore Hospital in Auckland, after falling ill at his home in Northcote.

At his death, Smithyman left five volumes of unpublished poems, including a number intended for an eventual Collected Works edition and more than 500 other poems he didn't intend to publish. Shortly before his death, he completed Atua Wera, a long poem of almost 300 parts largely about Penetana Papahurihia (also known as Te Atua Wera), an early 19th-century Ngā Puhi religious leader. The poem appeared posthumously as a book in 1997 and "was immediately recognised as perhaps his finest work and one of the major New Zealand poems", according to Peter Simpson. In 2006, "Mudflat Works", the online division of Holloway Press, published online Smithyman's 1,500-poem Collected Works, which Smithyman had selected, made final revisions for and put aside in 13 manila folders.

== Works ==
=== Published poetry ===
Each year links to corresponding "[year] in poetry" article:

- 1946: Seven Sonnets, Auckland: Pelorus Press
- 1950: The Blind Mountain & Other Poems, Christchurch: Caxton Press
- 1955: The Gay Trapeze, Wellington: Handcraft Press
- 1957: The Night Shift: Poems on Aspects of Love, by James K. Baxter, Charles Doyle, Louis Johnson and Kendrick Smithyman, Wellington: Capricorn Press
- 1962: Inheritance: Poems, Hamilton: Paul's Book Arcade
- 1968: Flying to Palmerston, Auckland: Published for the University of Auckland by the Oxford University Press
- 1972: Earthquake Weather, Auckland: Auckland University Press
- 1974: The Seal in the Dolphin Pool, Auckland: Auckland University Press
- 1978: Dwarf with a Billiard Cue, Auckland : Auckland University Press and Oxford University Press
- 1979: Menu, Departmental Dinner in Honour of Professor S. Musgrove and Professor M.K. Joseph, the Senior Common Room, 30 November 1979 / [Poetry by W.K. Smithyman], Auckland: s.n.
- 1983: Centennial Poets, Auckland: Printed for the Centenary Celebrations by the Mt Pleasant Press, University of Auckland; Poems by Kendrick Smithyman, Riemke Ensing, Terry Locke, Mervyn Thompson, Wystan Curnow, Peter Dane
- 1985: Stories about Wooden Keyboards, Auckland: Auckland University Press and Oxford University Press
- 1986: An Informal Occasion in the English Department for Peter Dane, Bill Pearson, Karl Stead, 5 December 1986: Three Poems, Auckland: Department of English, University of Auckland
- 1987: Are You Going to the Pictures, Auckland: Auckland University Press
- 1989: Kendrick Smithyman: Selected Poems, "Chosen and introduced by Peter Simpson", Auckland: Auckland University Press
- 1992: Auto/Biographies: Poems 1987-89, Auckland: Auckland University Press
- 1997: Tomarata, afterword by Peter Simpson, Auckland: Holloway Press; First published in: The Seal in the Dolphin Pool. Auckland: Auckland University Press, 1974.
- 1997: Atua Wera, Auckland: Auckland University Press (short-listed for Montana Book Awards in 1998)
- 2002: Last Poems, "With notes by Peter Simpson"; Auckland: Holloway Press
- 2002: Imperial Vistas Family Fictions, Auckland: Auckland University Press A total of 134 poems written in 1983–1984, but none of them published in his lifetime. Smithyman said he wrote them largely to inform his sons about aspects of their family history.
- 2004: Campana to Montale: Versions from Italian, Auckland: Writers Group
- 2004: Collected Poems, 1943-1995, edited & with notes by Margaret Edgcumbe and Peter Simpson, Auckland: Mudflat Webworks, ("Electronic book offered as part of the Smithyman Online website compiled by the University of Auckland and published by the online facility of the University of Auckland's Holloway Press, Mudflat Webworks," according to the University of Auckland Library website.)

=== Criticism ===
- 1965: A Way of Saying: a Study of New Zealand Poetry, Auckland: Collins

=== Edited by Smithyman ===
Each year links to corresponding "[year] in literature" article:

- 1971: William Satchell, The Land of the Lost, edited and introduced by Kendrick Smithyman, Auckland: Auckland University Press
- 1985: The New Gramophone Room: Poetry & Fiction, selected by C. K. Stead, Elizabeth Smither, Kendrick Smithyman, Auckland: Department of English, University of Auckland
- 1985: William Satchell, The Toll of the Bush, Edited and introduced by Kendrick Smithyman, Auckland: Auckland University Press, Oxford University Press
- 1987: Greville Texidor, In Fifteen Minutes You Can Say a Lot: Selected Fiction, edited and with an introduction by Kendrick Smithyman, Wellington: Victoria University Press
