= Kaihū Forest =

Forest in Northland Region, New Zealand

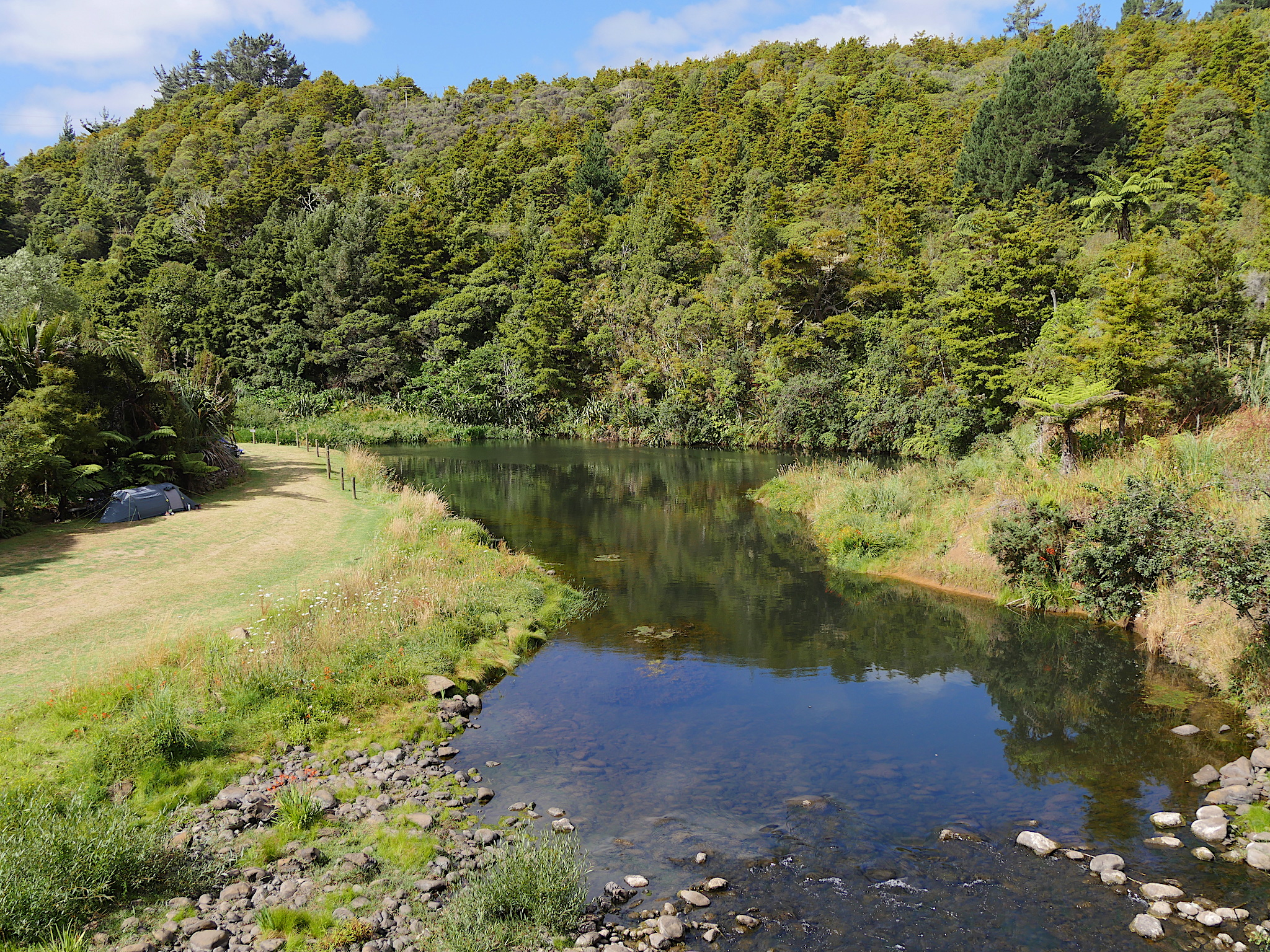
- The Kaihū River with the forest in the background.

- Location within North Island
- Interactive map of Kaihū Forest

Geography
- Location: Northland Region, New Zealand
- Coordinates: 35°45′S 173°45′E
- Elevation: Max. 770 metres (2,530 ft) (Tutamoe)
- Area: 2,400 hectares (5,900 acres)

Kaihū Forest is a protected forest area located in the Northland region of New Zealand, near the Kaihū River and the settlement of Kaihu. The forest spans approximately 2,400 ha (5,900 acres) of highlands, including Tutamoe, the second-tallest mountain in Northland, and is home to a wide range of native flora.

== Ecological significance ==
Historically, Kaihū Forest was home to kauri trees, which thrived in the region's mix of soft sedimentary material — which allowed for bigger root systems and moisture retention — and igneous material from the Waipoua volcano, which increased the soil's fertility. Early records of the forests in the area include mention of a large amount of kauri, including one by the name of Kairaru that, at a girth of 20 metres (66 ft) and height of 50 metres (160 ft), was the largest kauri ever recorded in New Zealand until destroyed by fire in 1891. Kauri have declined significantly in the area, remaining only in isolated pockets that are threatened by kauri dieback, but have been replaced by a wide range of other native plants, including tōtara, mānuka, kahikatea, and northern rātā, among other species.
