= Lake Wainui =

Lake in Northland, New Zealand

- Location within Northland Region
- Location: Northland Region, North Island
- Coordinates: 36.101390°S 173.882267°E
- Basin countries: New Zealand

Lake Wainui is a lake in the Northland Region of New Zealand.

Lake Wainui is a small dune lake located on the scenic Pouto Peninsula. Spanning approximately 4.8 hectares, with a maximum depth of 10.5 metres.

== Geography and Location ==
Situated on the Pouto Peninsula, the lake's geographic coordinates are 36° 6' 4" S, 173° 52' 53" E and it is surrounded by hills and greenery. Its location makes it easily accessible for locals and tourists alike. It has a 61.4 hectare catchment area and is 40m above sea level.

== Ecology and Biodiversity ==
Lake Wainui is known for its diverse ecosystem and rich biodiversity. The recent efforts to preserve and enhance the riparian edge surrounding the lake have contributed to the establishment of emergent vegetation, creating an ideal habitat for various species of flora and fauna. The exclusion of livestock from this narrow strip has allowed the vegetation to thrive undisturbed, resulting in an increase in wildlife activity and a healthier ecosystem overall.

== Conservation and Management ==
The preservation and conservation of Lake Wainui and its surrounding areas are of paramount importance. The recent fencing of the riparian edge to exclude livestock exemplifies the commitment to safeguarding the lake's natural environment. By allowing emergent vegetation to thrive, the initiative not only enhances the lake's aesthetic appeal but also promotes a healthier ecosystem by providing a habitat for a variety of plant and animal species.

== Visiting Lake Wainui ==
Lake Wainui is publicly accessible on foot, but has no public roads directly to it.

== See also ==
- List of lakes in New Zealand
