= Lake Waingata =

Lake in the North Island of New Zealand

- Location within Northland Region
- Location: Northland Region, North Island
- Coordinates: 36.351231°S 174.151124°E
- Basin countries: New Zealand

Lake Waingata is a lake on the Pouto Peninsula in the Kaipara District of New Zealand.

It is situated about 53 kilometres (33 mi) southwest of Dargaville, along with neighbouring Lake Rotokawau it is surrounded by pastoral grassland. The two lakes are separated by a thin piece of land approx 100 metres (330 ft) wide at its narrowest point.

== See also ==
- List of lakes in New Zealand
