= Awakino River (Northland) =

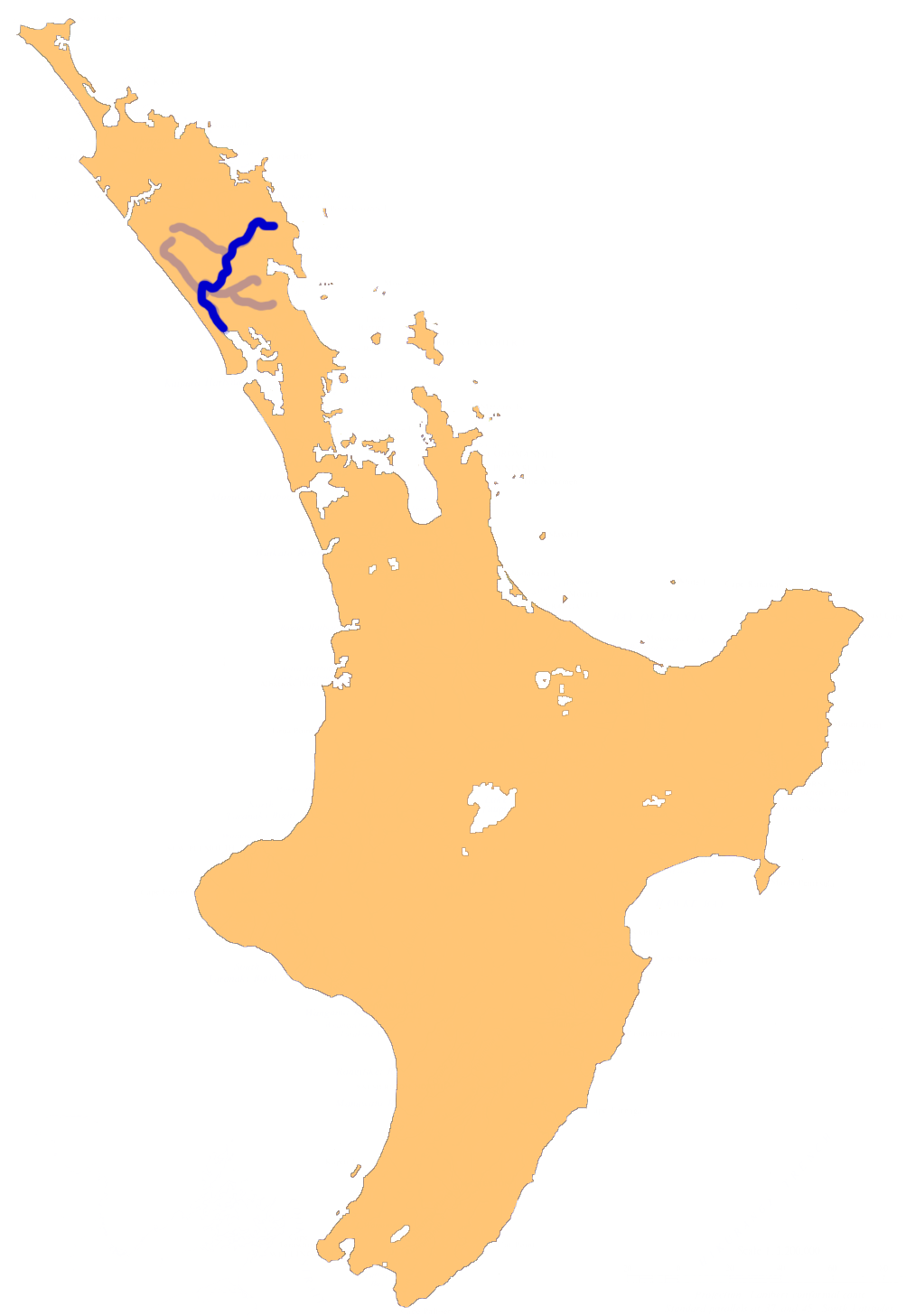
- The Awakino is the Wairoa tributary, which joins it from the north, nearest to the mouth

Location
- Country: New Zealand

Physical characteristics
- Source
  - location: Tutāmoe Range
  - elevation: 770 m (2,530 ft)
- Mouth
  - location: Dargaville
  - elevation: 0m
- Length: 38 km (24 mi)
- Basin size: 116 km^{2} (45 sq mi)

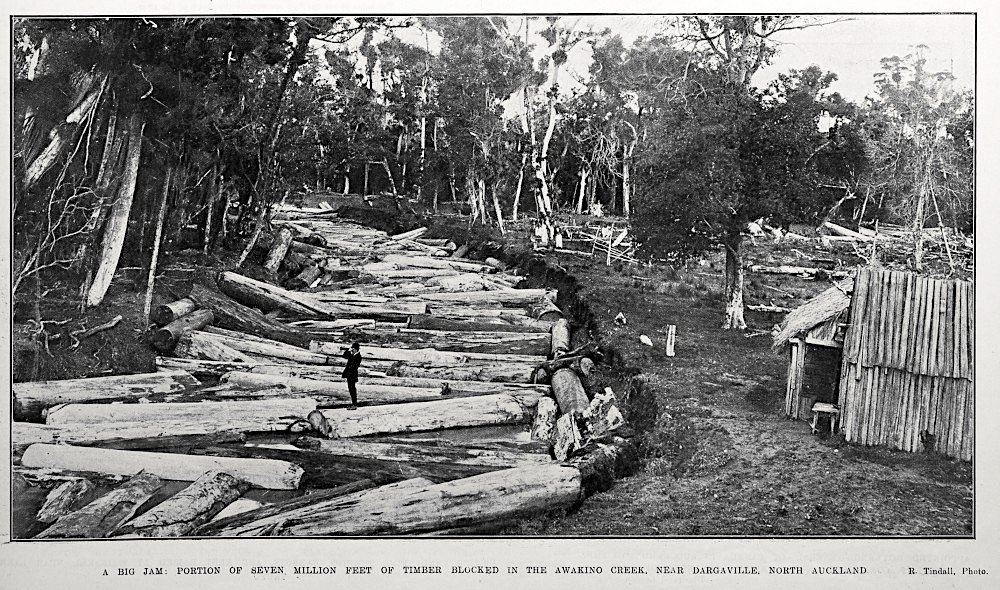
Awakino River blocked by logs in 1914

The Awakino River is a river of the Kaipara District in Northland Region. It flows 38 km (24 mi), generally south from the Awakino Stream, which rises on the Tutāmoe Range, to reach the Wairoa River on the eastern edge of Dargaville. The river is crossed by SH14 and the mothballed Dargaville Branch railway.

The New Zealand Ministry for Culture and Heritage gives a translation of "Bad creek", which accords with a 1981 description of "a slow, meandering drain through willows, swamp and flax lands, with little interest" and lined with muddy stop banks.

== See also ==
- List of rivers of New Zealand
