= Brynderwyn Range =

Ridge in Northland Peninsula, New Zealand

- Brynderwyn Hills
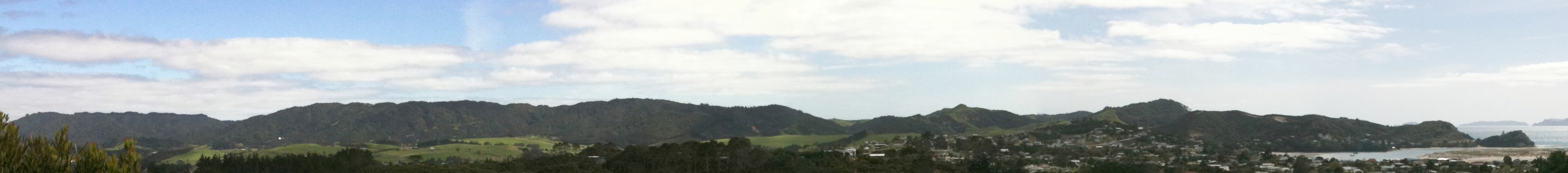
- The eastern end of the Brynderwyn Range as seen from Mangawhai Heads (October 2010)

Highest point
- Elevation: 430 m (1,410 ft)
- Coordinates: 36.0742°S 174.5024°E

Naming
- Native name: Piroa (Māori)

Geography
- Location within Northland Region
- Location: Northland, New Zealand

Geology
- Mountain type: Mountain range

The Brynderwyn Range or Brynderwyn Hills is a ridge extending east–west across the Northland Peninsula in northern New Zealand some 60 kilometres south of Whangārei, from the southern end of Bream Bay in the east to the Otamatea River (an arm of the Kaipara Harbour) in the west. Though not of great height (reaching only some 450 metres) it is a notable feature of the Northland Region's geography, not least because it is traversed by State Highway 1, which is forced to follow a tortuous route for some distance as it descends to the south. The small settlement of Brynderwyn lies at the southern foot of the hills, at the junction of SH1 and SH12. There are different walks of up to 10 km giving views of the Whangārei Heads, Bream Bay and out to sea.

The hills were the site of New Zealand's worst road accident. On 7 February 1963, a bus crashed after losing control of its brakes while nearing the top of the southern descent, killing 15 of the 35 people on board. In July 2014 the presumed remains of a 20-year missing Northland man were found there by forestry workers on a steep hillside.
