= The Greenstone Door =

- Author: William Satchell
- Language: English
- Genre: Bildungsroman
- Set in: New Zealand Wars
- Publication date: 1914
- Text: The Greenstone Door at Wikisource

The Greenstone Door is a 1914 novel by William Satchell. It is a Bildungsroman set in colonial Aotearoa, culminating in the invasion of the Waikato. In 1936 it was called "probably the most important in the history of New Zealand fiction".

== Plot ==
The book tells the story of Cedric Tregarthen. The son of a pākeha trader, he is orphaned in the sack of Te Kuma pa, and subsequently adopted by Pākehā Māori Purcell under the protection of Māori chief Te Waharoa. He is raised among the Ngāti Maniapoto along with his foster-sister Puhi-Huia, and befriends Rangiora, the son of a local ariki. As a teenager he is sent to Auckland, where he experiences Pākeha society and meets Purcell's business partner, Mr Brompart. He meets Governor George Grey, and falls in love with Helenora, a young member of the Governor's household. He also discovers his parentage as the grandson of an Earl, and learns of his father's betrayal of Helenora's mother.

Following Helenora's departure for England and a dispute with the Bromparts, Cedric returns to his foster-father. In the leadup to the Invasion of the Waikato, he attempts to broker peace, but is taken prisoner by the Tohunga Te Atua Mangu, who fears his influence on his foster-father. Escaping after eight months, he is recaptured, and forced to return to the British lines. There he serves General Duncan Cameron as a translator, ultimately witnessing the battle of Ōrākau, in which both Rangiora and Puhi-Huia are killed. His foster-father is then captured and executed for treason by his boyhood enemy, Fred Brompart. Driven mad, Cedric is ultimately nursed back to sanity by Helenora.

== Publication history ==
The book was first published in July 1914, and was originally a failure. This is widely attributed to the outbreak of World War I, with the book's strong anti-war themes, as well as the protagonist Purcell renouncing his British citizenship to live with Māori being regarded as "repugnant to British readers in 1914". Over time interest grew, and it was listed among examples of classic New Zealand literature.

The book was reprinted by Whitcombe & Tombs in 1935, and again by Golden Press in 1974, and by Viking in 1988.
