= Waiotama River =

Coordinates: 35°49′S 174°03′E

Location
- Country: New Zealand

Physical characteristics
- Mouth
  - location: Wairoa River
- Length: 15 km (9.3 mi)

The Waiotama River is a river of the Northland Region of New Zealand's North Island. It flows northwest from its origins south of Maungatapere to reach the Wairoa River 20 kilometres northeast of Dargaville.

== See also ==
- List of rivers of New Zealand
