= William Satchell =

New Zealand novelist (1861–1942)

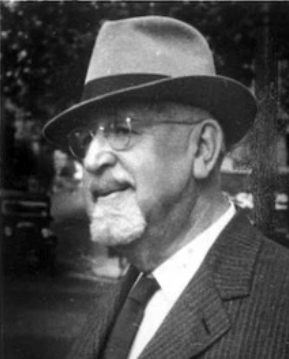
Satchell in 1936

William Arthur Satchell (1 February 1861 – 21 October 1942) was a New Zealand orchardist, writer, stockbroker, novelist and accountant.

== Early life ==
Satchell was born in London, England in 1861. His father, Thomas Satchell, was a civil servant, and little is known about his mother, Hannah Mordey. William's younger brother Thomas went on to emigrate to Japan and become an editor for the Japan Herald in Yokohama. He also had two younger sisters, Rosemary, and one sister, Alice, who died as a child of polio. As a boy he grew up in the Hampstead area, and was educated at Grove House School and Hurstpierpoint College. He then went on to attend Heidelberg University, but he did not graduate with any degree. Upon returning from his studies in Germany, Satchell's father set William up as the manager of a family publishing business, W. Satchell and Co. The company was never registered, and failed to make any profit. His father removed him from the publishing firm in 1884.

== Life and career in New Zealand ==
In 1886 Satchell decided to emigrate to New Zealand for his health, and settled at Waimā in the Hokianga area of the North Island, on a 400-acre block of Māori land that he cleared and farmed for five years with his partner, Elmer J. Brown. His brother Thomas and his cousin Frank Tomlinson joined them a few years later after Thomas Satchell Sr.'s death in 1887. On the 15 November 1889, at Rawene, he married Susan Bryers, a local Ngāpuhi woman and descendant of Te Whareumu.

Satchell's family faced serious financial hardship in the 1890s, as he had lost his land title at Waimā and could not find regular employment after moving from Hokianga to Auckland. This financial stress pushed him to write more short stories and poems, in the hopes of being published. Eventually, his poems and short stories were published semi-regularly in Graphic, a subsidiary of the Auckland Star, sometimes under the pseudonym "Samuel Cliall White.

Satchell found financial success as a stockbroker during the second Thames gold rush of 1895, and in 1900 Satchell had enough money to publish his first poetry book Patriotic and Other Poems, which was well received.

Between 1902 and 1914 Satchell wrote four novels, all set in New Zealand, and all influenced by his own experiences as a settler. His first novel The Land of the Lost, published in 1902, was well received in England. A review in The Athenaeum described his writing as being "imbued with a strong appreciative sense of the bigness and beauty and mystery of nature, and a distinct gift for conveying the gleanings of that sense upon paper." The Land of the Lost was not as well received in New Zealand, where the novel's depiction of life on the gumfields lacked novelty to local readers. His following novels The Toll of the Bush (1905), and The Elixir of Life (1907) had a similar reception.

The Greenstone Door (1914) is a romantic adventure of inter-racial relationships set in the Auckland region during the New Zealand Wars in the middle decades of the nineteenth century. It initially had a lukewarm reception, both overseas and in New Zealand. This may have partially been due to the novel's strong anti-war themes and its publication at the start of World War I, as well as the protagonist Purcell renouncing his British citizenship to live with Māori. The book also contains intertextual reference to works of German literature by Schiller, Novalis, and Karl May.

Satchell did not serve during World War I, but his sons Tom, Allan, and William all fought in France and Palestine, which prompted Satchell to write meditative weekly columns on the nature of war in the New Zealand Herald.

Satchell lived in Kopu, near Thames, between 1917 and 1928, working as an accountant for a timber company. He was reportedly disappointed with the commercial failure of The Greenstone Door and suffered from stomach ulcers. He worked as an accountant for the same company in Auckland between 1928 and 1936, until the company went out of business.

Over time, The Greenstone Door grew somewhat of a cult following, and was republished in 1935. This was followed by a reprint of Land of the Lost in 1938. Satchell was granted a civil list pension in 1939 in recognition of his literary services; he was only the third New Zealander to receive such an award from the government. He died in Auckland in October 1942. His wife predeceased him by six years; he was survived by five sons and four daughters.

== Assessments ==
Although Satchell found little commercial success in his lifetime, Joan Stevens says in her book The New Zealand Novel 1860–1965 (1966) that Satchell is the only New Zealand novelist, "in all the early years up to 1910, whose work has endured and is still readable in its own right". In 1996, in the Dictionary of New Zealand Biography, Kendrick Smithyman said The Land of the Lost, The Toll of the Bush and The Greenstone Door "represent the most significant achievement in New Zealand fiction before the First World War".

A biography, The Maorilander, by Phillip Wilson, was published in 1961. Wilson wrote an expanded version, titled William Satchell, in 1968.

== Books ==
- Patriotic and Other Poems (1900)
- The Land of the Lost (1902)
- The Toll of the Bush (1905)
- The Elixir of Life (1907)
- The Greenstone Door (1914)
