= Brynderwyn =

Coordinates: 36.097°S 174.430°E

Brynderwyn is a settlement in Northland, New Zealand. It is located at the junction of SH1 and SH12 between Whangārei and Wellsford, and a narrowing of the North Auckland Peninsula between Bream Bay and the upper branches of the Kaipara Harbour. It is most notable as the scene of a 1963 bus crash which killed 15 people in the Brynderwyn Range.

The Welsh name for this locality may have been given by William Wright of Sydney, who received a Crown grant on 13 May 1858.
