= Tutamoe =

Second highest mountain in Northland, New Zealand

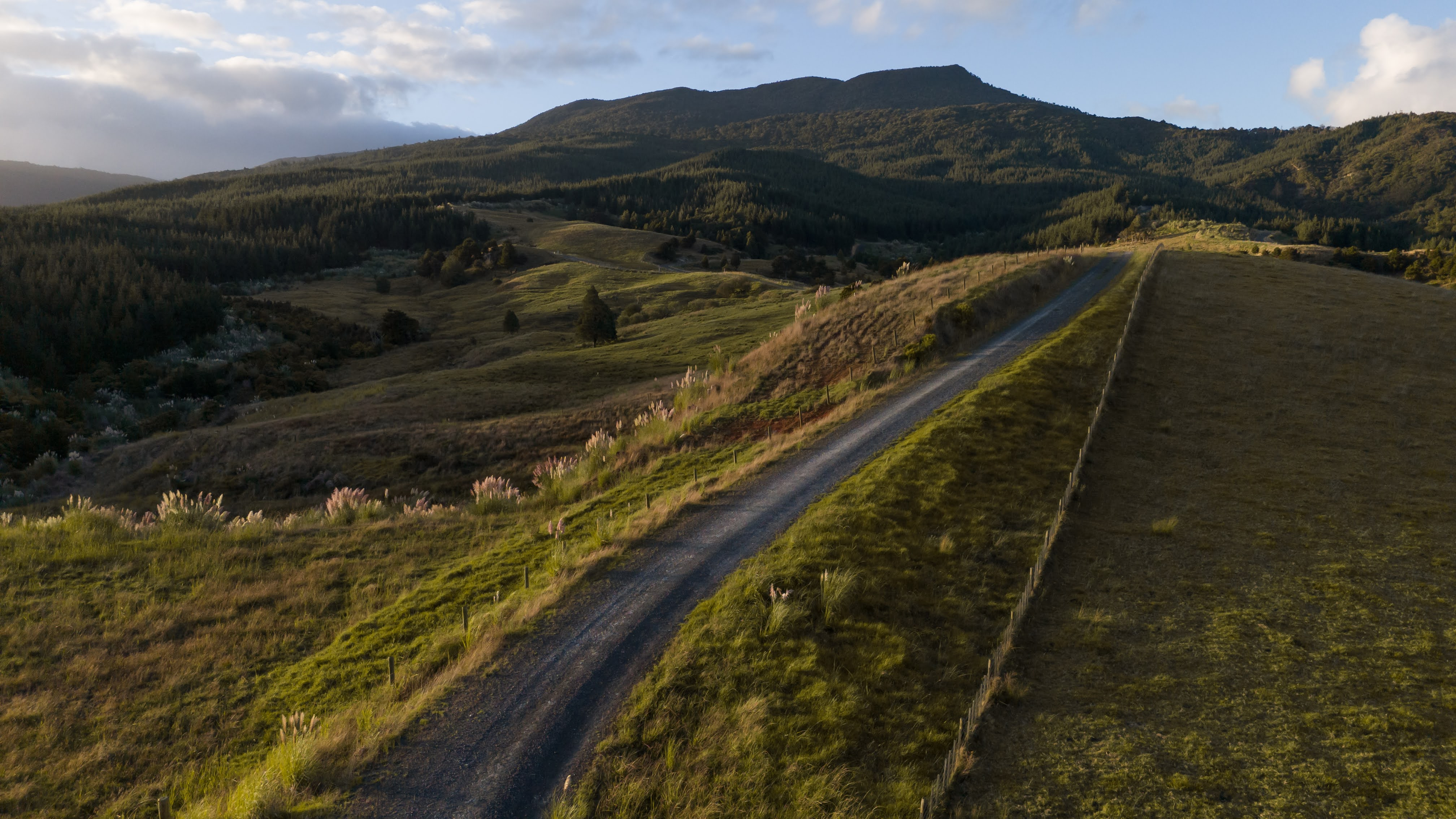
- Tutamoe as seen from the south

Highest point
- Elevation: 770 m (2,530 ft)
- Coordinates: 35°45′36″S 173°48′08″E

Naming
- Language of name: Maori

Geography

Tutamoe is the second highest mountain in Northland, New Zealand, with a height of 770 metres (2,530 ft). It is located in the Kaihu Forest, approximately 20 kilometres north of Dargaville.

Historically, the slopes of Tutamoe were densely forested with kauri trees (Agathis australis). The eastern slopes of Tutamoe were home to the largest kauri tree, Kairaru, having a circumference of 20 m and being 30.5 m to the first branches, double the size of Tāne Mahuta. Kairaru was lost to a fire in the late 1880s.

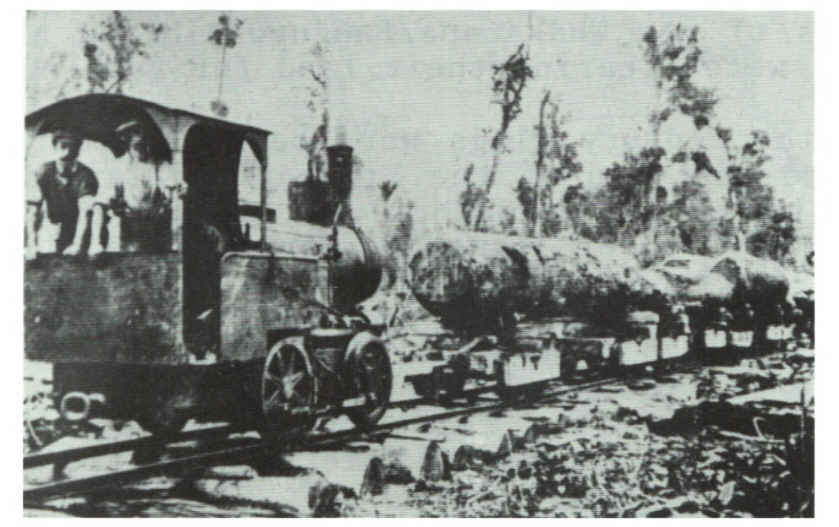
Gibbons and Harris engine moving kauri timber at Tutamoe, 1905

The mountain's soils, primarily composed of soft sedimentary material, provide ideal conditions for kauri trees to establish deep root systems and access moisture during the summer months. Additionally, basalt rocks, originating from the ancient Waipoua volcano, are abundant on the slopes. These mineral-rich rocks contribute to the fertility of the soil over time, creating favourable growing conditions. Many of the large kauri trees that remain today are found in areas with deep, fertile soils.

According to Māori mythology, Tutamoe is the guardian of the tribes in the area surrounding present-day Dargaville.
