= Te Kōpuru =

- Interactive map of Te Kōpuru
- Coordinates: 36°1′51.6″S 173°55′21″E
- Country: New Zealand
- Region: Northland Region
- District: Kaipara District
- Ward: West Coast-Central Ward
- Electorates: Northland; Te Tai Tokerau

Government
  - Territorial Authority: Kaipara District Council
  - Regional council: Northland Regional Council
  - Mayor of Kaipara: Jonathan Larsen
  - Northland MP: Grant McCallum
  - Te Tai Tokerau MP: Mariameno Kapa-Kingi

Area
  - Total: 2.63 km^{2} (1.02 sq mi)

Population (June 2025)
  - Total: 550
  - Density: 210/km^{2} (540/sq mi)

Te Kōpuru is the largest community on the Pouto Peninsula in Northland, New Zealand. The Wairoa River separates the peninsula at this point from the main North Auckland Peninsula to the east. Dargaville is 14 km (8.7 mi) to the north.

== History and culture ==
=== Pre-European history ===
The area was initially occupied by Ngāti Awa, but the Ngāti Whātua displaced them in the late 17th or early 18th century. During the Musket Wars of the early 19th century, fighting between Ngā Puhi and Ngāti Whātua and the effects of influenza substantially depopulated the area.

=== European settlement ===
In 1841, a skull found in a Pākehā farmer's store at Mangawhare infuriated local Māori, who enacted “Muru” by attacking and plundering his store. A court exonerated the farmer and the perpetrators of the “Muru” ceded the land at Te Kōpuru as compensation. The perpetrators had no interests or rights in the land. A hui held at Te Kōpuru in 1860 to make peace between Ngāti Whātua and Ngā Puhi was attended by about 600 people.

An attempt to set up a kauri sawmill at Te Kōpuru began in 1867, but the machinery was damaged because the ship was leaky, and the owners refused its delivery. In 1870 a mill engineer, B C Massey, was looking for work. The mill may have been completed in 1870 by him, or in 1871 by Mr Doyle of Auckland, who took the work at a contract of about 2,000 pounds. The mill was the largest in New Zealand, producing 120,000 feet (37,000 m) of timber per week in 1875. It was destroyed by fire in 1883, but rebuilt, and rebuilt again after another fire in 1906 The town had a stable population of about 215 by the end of the decade. By 1876, the town had stores which were "fitted up in first-rate style, and [were] well-stocked" and a library, but no hotel. A Post Office opened in 1877. In 1878, the town was described as like the "port of some thriving inland city". A steamer service provided transport to Dargaville and Helensville twice a week from February 1878, and a road to Dargaville opened in 1879.

=== 20th century ===
The population increased to 440 during the 1890s as the timber industry grew. A road was built south to Tikinui in 1897, and partially metalled the following year. A library was built in 1899. Gum-diggers were active in the area in the 1890s through at least 1910, and around the turn of the century W Brown and Sons established a boat building yard at Te Kōpuru. Dairy herds became established in the early 20th century. In 1903, the Customs Office was moved to Te Kōpuru from Pouto. A hospital was built to treat the accident victims from Te Kōpuru, Aratapu and Tatarariki, with Te Kōpuru as the hospital site rather than Dargaville because the mill towns had a larger population.

The first sealed road in the Kaipara District was probably the one from Te Kōpuru to Mount Wesley, just south of Dargaville, in about 1918. The mill closed in 1920. Having a hospital sustained the town. The road north degraded to a metalled road by the 1930s. In 1956, the general wards of Te Kopuru Hospital moved to the new hospital in Dargaville. Maternity and services for the elderly continued, although the main hospital building burned down in 1959. In 1971, the hospital closed with maternity services moved to the Dargaville Hospital.

A ferry service was established in 1934 running from Raupo (on the eastern shore of the Northern Wairoa) to Tikinui (just south of Te Kōpuru). The service was initially established to transport milk from dairy farms on the Pouto Peninsula to the dairy factory located in Ruawai, but many travellers to the peninsula found using the ferry service preferable to driving through Dargaville (currently a 35-minute journey but far longer on the metalled and windy roads of the time). This was particularly true during the toheroa season (now illegal to harvest as the population has not recovered from over exploitation in the 1950s and 1960s) when families would come from all over the country to harvest the shellfish, found on the west coast beaches of Northland, that many thought of as a delicacy. Improved road conditions and the establishment of a railway line led to the service being discontinued around 1971.

=== Marae ===
Some Ngāti Whātua marae are located in or around Te Kōpuru. Ōtūrei Marae and Rangimārie Te Aroha meeting house are affiliated with Te Uri o Hau and Te Popoto. The Waikāretu or Pōuto Marae and Rīpia marae sites are also connected with Te Uri o Hau.

== Demographics ==
Statistics New Zealand describes Te Kōpuru as a rural settlement, which covers 2.63 km^{2} (1.02 sq mi) and had an estimated population of 550 as of June 2025, with a population density of 209 people per km^{2}. Te Kōpuru is part of the larger Kaipara Coastal statistical area.

Historical population
Year	Pop.	±% p.a.
2006	456	—
2013	465	+0.28%
2018	498	+1.38%
2023	540	+1.63%

Te Kōpuru had a population of 540 in the 2023 New Zealand census, an increase of 42 people (8.4%) since the 2018 census, and an increase of 75 people (16.1%) since the 2013 census. There were 264 males, 270 females and 6 people of other genders in 219 dwellings. 2.8% of people identified as LGBTIQ+. The median age was 43.0 years (compared with 38.1 years nationally). There were 117 people (21.7%) aged under 15 years, 84 (15.6%) aged 15 to 29, 249 (46.1%) aged 30 to 64, and 93 (17.2%) aged 65 or older.

People could identify as more than one ethnicity. The results were 73.9% European (Pākehā), 50.0% Māori, 3.9% Pasifika, 1.7% Asian, and 5.6% other, which includes people giving their ethnicity as "New Zealander". English was spoken by 97.8%, Māori language by 10.0%, and other languages by 3.3%. No language could be spoken by 2.2% (e.g. too young to talk). New Zealand Sign Language was known by 0.6%. The percentage of people born overseas was 7.8, compared with 28.8% nationally.

Religious affiliations were 30.0% Christian, 5.6% Māori religious beliefs, 0.6% Buddhist, 1.1% New Age, and 0.6% other religions. People who answered that they had no religion were 55.6%, and 7.2% of people did not answer the census question.

Of those at least 15 years old, 36 (8.5%) people had a bachelor's or higher degree, 246 (58.2%) had a post-high school certificate or diploma, and 132 (31.2%) people exclusively held high school qualifications. The median income was $25,500, compared with $41,500 nationally. 9 people (2.1%) earned over $100,000 compared to 12.1% nationally. The employment status of those at least 15 was that 156 (36.9%) people were employed full-time, 51 (12.1%) were part-time, and 27 (6.4%) were unemployed.

== Notable people ==
- John Carter, politician
- Eddie Dunn, All Black
- Ian Dunn, All Black
- Jane Goulding, hockey player
- Warwick Henderson, art gallerist
- Ross Meurant, politician and policeman
- Mina Ripia, musician
- Lana Searle, radio announcer
- Clem Simich, politician
- Kendrick Smithyman, poet
- Kelly Tarlton, marine archaeologist
- John Atkinson Walker, first manager, Te Kopuru sawmill
- Lawrence Weathers, Victoria Cross recipient
- Clifton Webb, politician

== Education ==
Te Kōpuru School is a coeducational full primary (years 1–8) school with a roll of 82 students as of March 2026. The school was founded in 1872. In 1937, the primary schools in Tikinui, Tatarariki and Redhill consolidated into Te Kōpuru School.

Aratapu District High School, a little to the north of Te Kōpuru, closed in 1965. The nearest secondary school is now in Dargaville.
