= Lake Rotokawau (Kaipara) =

Lake in Northland, New Zealand

- Location within Northland Region
- Location: Pouto Peninsula, Northland Region, North Island
- Coordinates: 36.34692°S 174.1472°E
- Type: Dune Lake
- Catchment area: 102.5 hectares (253 acres)
- Basin countries: New Zealand
- Surface area: 26.74 hectares (66.1 acres)
- Max. depth: 12.96 metres (42.5 ft)

Lake Rotokawau is a lake on the Pouto Peninsula in the Kaipara District of New Zealand.

Rotokawau is situated about 52 kilometres (32 mi) southwest of Dargaville, along with neighbouring Lake Waingata it is surrounded by pastoral grassland. At its deepest point it is 12.96 metres (42.5 ft) deep. The Northland Regional Council regularly checks the dune lakes with diving, water sampling and land-based surveys to assess water quality and ecological conditions. In the words of Brooke Gray, Biodiversity Advisor for the Northland Regional Council, "Rotokawau is one of the top ecologically outstanding lakes in Northland".

The lake sits within ground water level, but only receives around 7% of its water from ground water, therefore it is classified as a Class 3 Window dune lake. Rainfall accounts for 59% of its water and 34% is from surface runoff.

The lake does not thermally stratify, which increases nutrient availability in the water column throughout the year.

== Etymology ==
In Māori, Roto means 'lake' and kawau means 'cormorant' or 'shag', a local bird.
