= Jane Goulding =

New Zealand field hockey player

Jane Elizabeth Goulding (born 18 October 1957 in Te Kōpuru to Nionne and John Goulding) is a retired field hockey player from New Zealand, who was a member of the national team that finished sixth at the 1984 Summer Olympics in Los Angeles, California.
