= 1963 Brynderwyn bus accident =

Bus crash near Brynderwyn, New Zealand killing 15 people

Coordinates: 36°04′45.7″S 174°25′34.1″E

Details
- Date: 7 February 1963; 13:00
- Location: Pilbrow Hill, Brynderwyn Range
- Country: New Zealand
- Owner: Waikato Services Ltd.
- Cause: Brake failure

Statistics
- Passengers: 35
- Crew: 1
- Deaths: 15
- Injured: 21

The 1963 Brynderwyn bus accident occurred on the day after Waitangi Day, 7 February 1963, when a bus rolled down a slope in the Brynderwyn Range, killing 15 people. To date, it is the deadliest road accident in New Zealand history.

== Background ==
The 1963 Waitangi Day celebrations in Waitangi, Northland, were attended by Queen Elizabeth II and the Duke of Edinburgh. A bus was chartered by the Māori Affairs Department to carry 35 passengers to and from the celebrations. All of the passengers were Māori from the wider Auckland area, many from the Ngāti Whātua o Kaipara iwi. Some were part of a kapa haka delegation that performed for the Queen at Waitangi. The bus, owned by Waikato Services Ltd., was driven by 46-year-old Harold Parker.

== Accident ==
The bus departed Paihia on the morning of 7 February. The accident occurred after 1:00 pm, when the bus was traversing the Brynderwyn Ranges section of State Highway 1, between the towns of Waipu and Kaiwaka. The bus had just finished a break at the summit of Pilbrow Hill. As the bus started to descend down the southern face of the hill, the service brakes on the bus failed. Following this, Parker attempted to steer the bus through the remainder of the downhill section. The bus left the road on the final bend of the hill, plummeting some 30 m down the valley of the Piroa Stream.

== Aftermath and legacy ==
The Snelling family, who owned a farm nearby and had heard the accident, were the first to reach the wreckage. Additionally, a party of 5 members from the Auckland District Māori Council, who had also been travelling on the road, assisted with the initial response. 14 people were initially killed by the accident. Another person later died from their injuries, resulting in a death toll of 15. The remaining 21 injured were taken to Whangarei Hospital by 3:30 pm.

Following the accident, the Queen sent a message of condolence to Prime Minister Keith Holyoake, asking him to "convey [Prince Philip and I's] sympathy to the injured and the next-of-kin of those who lost their lives in the bus."

A commission of inquiry was held by the Department of Transport in April 1963, which concluded that the accident was caused by brake failure. Regulations for passenger service vehicle construction were subsequently changed sixteen months later.

The communities of Onehunga and Māngere were strongly impacted by the accident, as many of the passengers were members of the community. Tangihanga were held at Onehunga, which were attended by Prime Minister Keith Holyoake and opposition leader Walter Nash. Seeing the difficulty that the communities had in arranging the tangi, Holyoake and Nash agreed to co-fund a marae in the area. This led to the construction of Te Puea Memorial Marae in Māngere Bridge, Auckland, which was opened in 1965.

A memorial stone was unveiled at the scene location on 7 February 2003, on the 40th anniversary of the accident.
