= Lake Rotokawau (Karikari Peninsula) =

- Location within Northland Region
- Location: Far North District, Northland Region, North Island
- Coordinates: 34.870°S 173.309°E
- Type: Dune lake
- Basin countries: New Zealand
- Surface area: 63.3 hectares (156 acres)
- Max. depth: 12 m (39 ft)

Lake Rotokawau is a dune lake on the Karikari Peninsula in the Far North District of New Zealand. It is northeast of Rangiputa village and near Puwheke Beach. It is sometimes referred to as 'Lake Rotokawau West' and is the larger of two adjacent lakes.

The lake has no inflows or outflows. The surrounding catchment is pasture and kanuka/manuka scrub, with pohutukawa forest to the north of the lake.
