= Tangiteroria =

- Interactive map of Tangiteroria
- Coordinates: 35°49′17″S 174°2′41″E
- Country: New Zealand
- Region: Northland Region
- District: Kaipara District
- Ward: West Coast-Central Ward
- Electorates: Northland; Te Tai Tokerau

Government
  - Territorial Authority: Kaipara District Council
  - Regional council: Northland Regional Council
  - Mayor of Kaipara: Jonathan Larsen
  - Northland MP: Grant McCallum
  - Te Tai Tokerau MP: TBD

Tangiteroria is a small rural community in the North Island of New Zealand. It is located halfway between Whangārei and Dargaville on State Highway 14 on the banks of the Northern Wairoa river.

It consists of a primary school, pub (currently closed), Catholic Church (currently closed), petrol station (currently closed), marae, and a sports complex/community centre (open for meals fortnightly). The sports complex and community centre were destroyed by a fire in the early hours of January 16, 2020, but rebuilt and opened in September 2023.

Kirikopuni and Pukehuia both had railway stations on the Dargaville Branch for the movement of stock throughout Northland and a passenger service.

== History and culture ==
A Wesleyan mission station was set up by James Wallis in 1836, and then run by James Buller. The station lasted until 1853. Kauri logs were sent down the river to be milled in the mid-1860s. A flax mill operated in the late 19th century.

A steamer service up the Wairoa River was established to Tangiteroria by the Tangihua in 1878, and Watson's Landing and store flourished there in 1881. The S.S. Blanche ran a service between Dargaville and Tangiteroria in 1891-2, and the S.S. Ethel was doing the run twice a week in 1896. It was replaced by the S.S. Naumai from 1903-1920. The service finished in 1929. Road access was established in the 1890s.

== Marae ==
The local Tangiterōria Marae and Tirarau meeting house are a traditional meeting place for the Ngāpuhi hapū of Te Parawhau and Te Uriroroi, and the Ngāti Whātua hapū of Te Kuihi and Te Parawhau.

== Demographics ==
Tangiteroria is in an SA1 statistical area which covers 95.05 km^{2} (36.70 sq mi). The SA1 area is part of the larger Maungaru statistical area.

Historical population for Tangiteoria and surrounds
Year	Pop.	±% p.a.
2006	201	—
2013	168	−2.53%
2018	204	+3.96%
2023	198	−0.60%

The SA1 statistical area had a population of 198 in the 2023 New Zealand census, a decrease of 6 people (−2.9%) since the 2018 census, and an increase of 30 people (17.9%) since the 2013 census. There were 105 males and 93 females in 87 dwellings. 3.0% of people identified as LGBTIQ+. The median age was 46.9 years (compared with 38.1 years nationally). There were 33 people (16.7%) aged under 15 years, 36 (18.2%) aged 15 to 29, 90 (45.5%) aged 30 to 64, and 39 (19.7%) aged 65 or older.

People could identify as more than one ethnicity. The results were 86.4% European (Pākehā), 22.7% Māori, 3.0% Pasifika, 1.5% Asian, and 3.0% other, which includes people giving their ethnicity as "New Zealander". English was spoken by 98.5%, Māori language by 4.5%, Samoan by 1.5%, and other languages by 3.0%. No language could be spoken by 3.0% (e.g. too young to talk). The percentage of people born overseas was 15.2, compared with 28.8% nationally.

The only religious affiliation given was 21.2% Christian. People who answered that they had no religion were 59.1%, and 16.7% of people did not answer the census question.

Of those at least 15 years old, 12 (7.3%) people had a bachelor's or higher degree, 105 (63.6%) had a post-high school certificate or diploma, and 39 (23.6%) people exclusively held high school qualifications. The median income was $38,000, compared with $41,500 nationally. 12 people (7.3%) earned over $100,000 compared to 12.1% nationally. The employment status of those at least 15 was that 87 (52.7%) people were employed full-time, 21 (12.7%) were part-time, and 3 (1.8%) were unemployed.

=== Maungaru statistical area ===
Maungaru statistical area, which also includes Tangowahine, covers 691.81 km^{2} (267.11 sq mi) and had an estimated population of 1,860 as of June 2025, with a population density of 2.7 people per km^{2}.

Historical population for Maungaru statistical area
Year	Pop.	±% p.a.
2006	1,713	—
2013	1,686	−0.23%
2018	1,800	+1.32%
2023	1,836	+0.40%

Maungaru had a population of 1,836 in the 2023 New Zealand census, an increase of 36 people (2.0%) since the 2018 census, and an increase of 150 people (8.9%) since the 2013 census. There were 924 males, 900 females and 12 people of other genders in 687 dwellings. 2.3% of people identified as LGBTIQ+. The median age was 44.6 years (compared with 38.1 years nationally). There were 327 people (17.8%) aged under 15 years, 309 (16.8%) aged 15 to 29, 840 (45.8%) aged 30 to 64, and 357 (19.4%) aged 65 or older.

People could identify as more than one ethnicity. The results were 89.2% European (Pākehā); 24.7% Māori; 3.8% Pasifika; 3.3% Asian; 0.5% Middle Eastern, Latin American and African New Zealanders (MELAA); and 2.8% other, which includes people giving their ethnicity as "New Zealander". English was spoken by 97.5%, Māori language by 3.9%, Samoan by 0.5%, and other languages by 4.7%. No language could be spoken by 2.1% (e.g. too young to talk). New Zealand Sign Language was known by 0.3%. The percentage of people born overseas was 10.5, compared with 28.8% nationally.

Religious affiliations were 29.4% Christian, 0.3% Hindu, 0.3% Islam, 1.3% Māori religious beliefs, 0.2% Buddhist, 0.5% New Age, and 1.1% other religions. People who answered that they had no religion were 55.4%, and 11.4% of people did not answer the census question.

Of those at least 15 years old, 126 (8.3%) people had a bachelor's or higher degree, 933 (61.8%) had a post-high school certificate or diploma, and 408 (27.0%) people exclusively held high school qualifications. The median income was $34,100, compared with $41,500 nationally. 108 people (7.2%) earned over $100,000 compared to 12.1% nationally. The employment status of those at least 15 was that 765 (50.7%) people were employed full-time, 249 (16.5%) were part-time, and 27 (1.8%) were unemployed.

== Education ==
Tangiteroria School is a coeducational full primary (years 1-8) school with a roll of 34 students as of July 2026. The school was established in 1886.
