= Maungatapere =

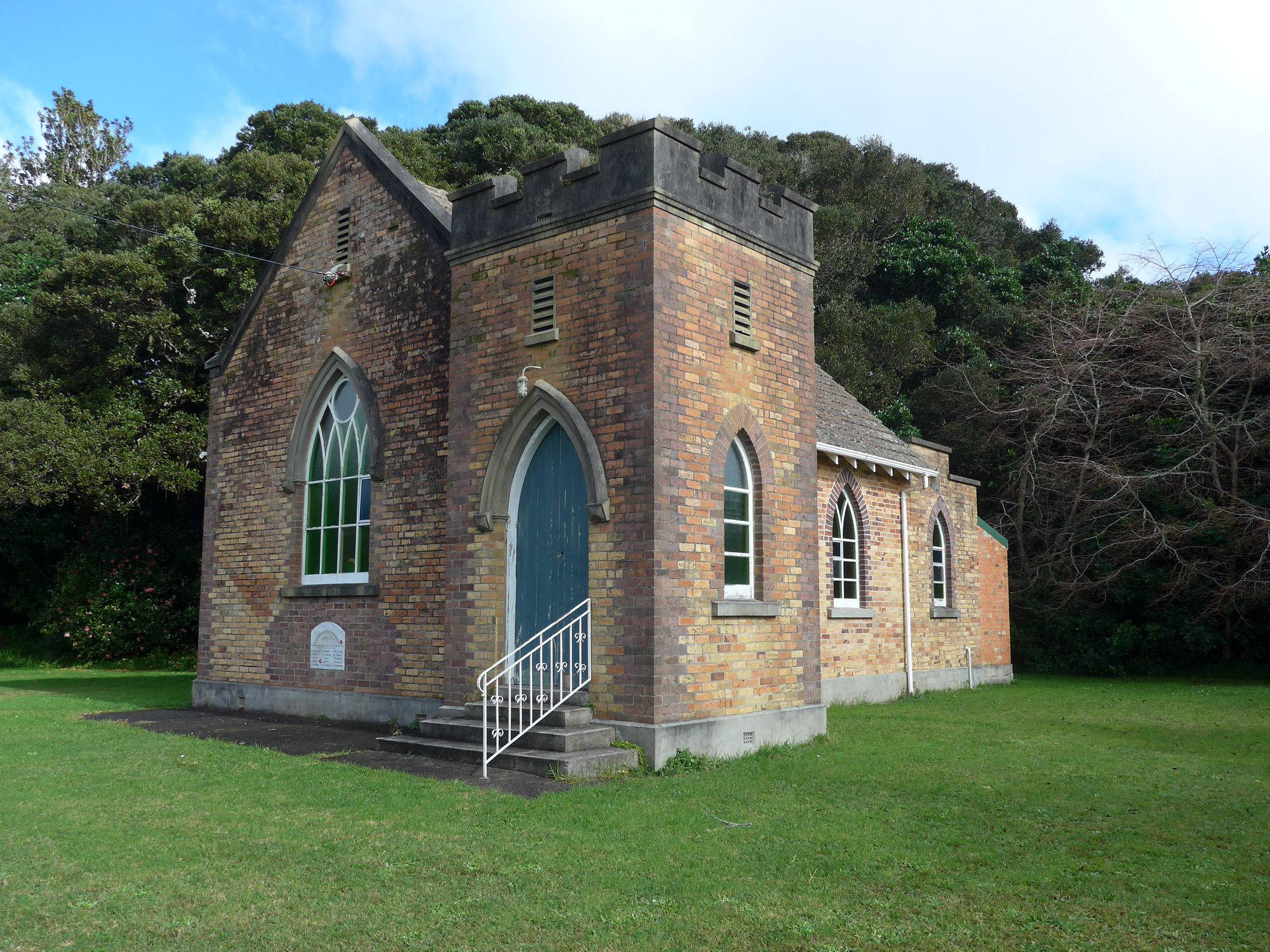
- Maungatapere war memorial church
- Interactive map of Maungatapere
- Coordinates: 35°45′18″S 174°12′28″E
- Country: New Zealand
- Region: Northland Region
- District: Whangarei District
- Ward: Mangakahia-Maungatapere Ward
- Electorates: Whangārei; Te Tai Tokerau

Government
  - Territorial Authority: Whangarei District Council
  - Regional council: Northland Regional Council
  - Mayor of Whangārei: Ken Couper
  - Whangārei MP: Shane Reti
  - Te Tai Tokerau MP: Mariameno Kapa-Kingi

Area
  - Total: 1.33 km^{2} (0.51 sq mi)

Population (June 2025)
  - Total: 330
  - Density: 250/km^{2} (640/sq mi)

Maungatapere is a settlement in Northland, New Zealand. State Highway 14 runs through it.

== Geography ==
The settlement takes its name from a rounded volcanic peak of the same name (a Maori name meaning "meeting house by the mountain") that lies to the southwest, and has a summit 359 metres above sea level. Whangārei is 11 km (6.8 mi) to the east, and Tangiteroria is 18 km (11 mi) to the south west. Maungatapere is at the junction of State Highways 14 and 15. It is the antipode of the city of Tangier, Morocco.

== History ==
Thomas Elmsley bought 60,000 acres (24,000 ha) of land in Maungatapere and northern Wairoa from Te Tirarau Kukupa in 1839. The next year he and the brothers Henry and Charles Walton brought workers to establish farms in the area. Henry Walton's farm was on the slopes of Maungatapere Mountain and was called "Maungatapere Park". After the Flagstaff War, Walton employed former soldiers to build stone walls which are still a feature of the area. Walton built a road between Maungatapere and Whangarei in 1858.

A war memorial church was planned for Maungatapere in 1919 but did not open until 1928 due to difficulty with fundraising.

== Demographics ==
Statistics New Zealand describes Maungatāpere as a rural settlement. The settlement covers 1.33 km^{2} (0.51 sq mi) and had an estimated population of 330 as of June 2025, with a population density of 248 people per km^{2}. The settlement is part of the larger Maungatāpere statistical area.

Historical population for the settlement
| Year | Pop. | ±% p.a. |
|---|---|---|
| 2006 | 231 | — |
| 2013 | 261 | +1.76% |
| 2018 | 273 | +0.90% |
| 2023 | 321 | +3.29% |
The 2006 population is for a smaller area of 1.29 km^{2} Source:

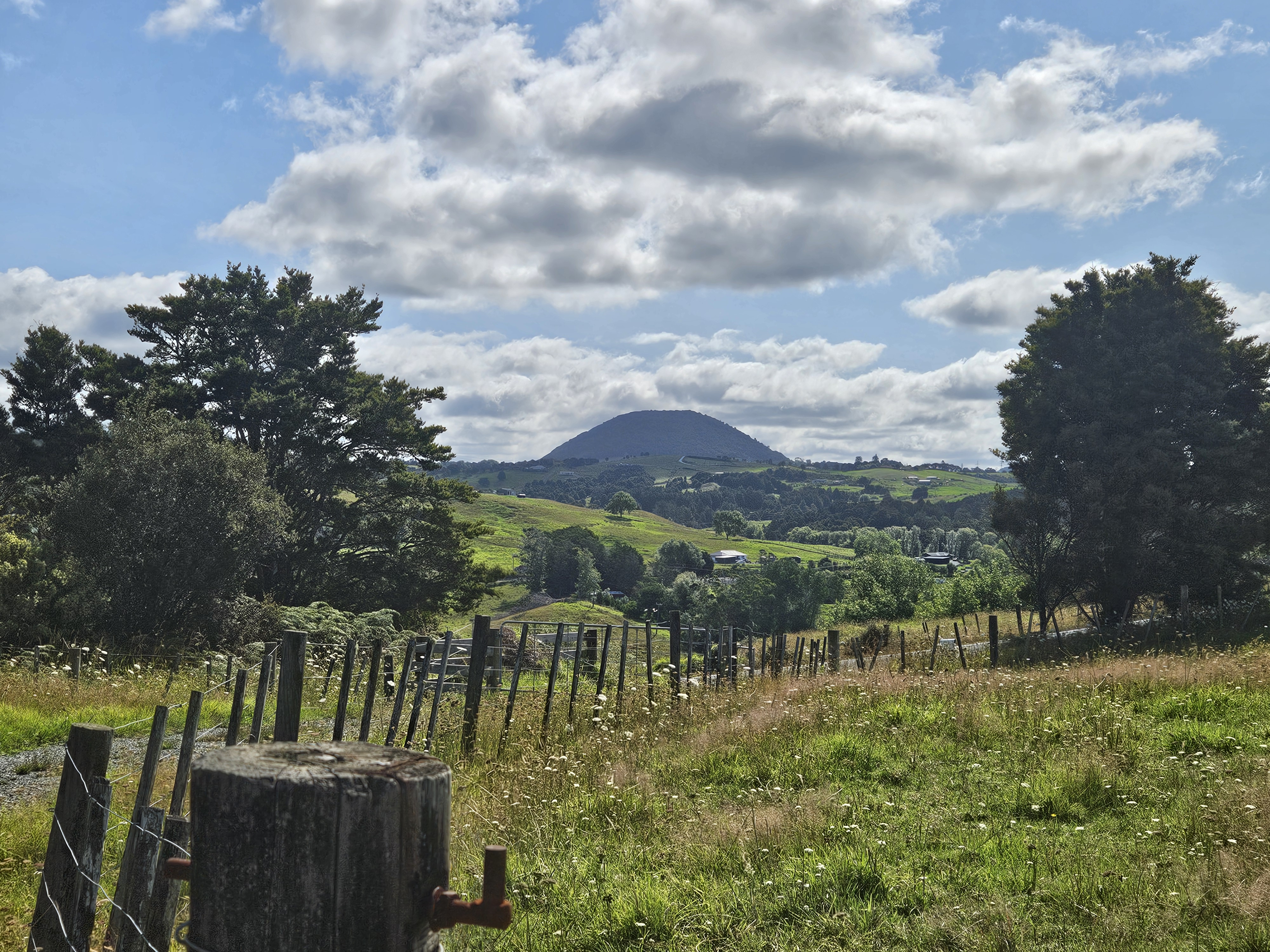
The Maungatapere volcano seen from Otaika Valley

Maungatāpere had a population of 321 in the 2023 New Zealand census, an increase of 48 people (17.6%) since the 2018 census, and an increase of 60 people (23.0%) since the 2013 census. There were 156 males and 165 females in 105 dwellings. 2.8% of people identified as LGBTIQ+. The median age was 39.3 years (compared with 38.1 years nationally). There were 72 people (22.4%) aged under 15 years, 51 (15.9%) aged 15 to 29, 129 (40.2%) aged 30 to 64, and 69 (21.5%) aged 65 or older.

People could identify as more than one ethnicity. The results were 82.2% European (Pākehā), 32.7% Māori, 2.8% Pasifika, 5.6% Asian, and 3.7% other, which includes people giving their ethnicity as "New Zealander". English was spoken by 97.2%, Māori language by 7.5%, and other languages by 5.6%. No language could be spoken by 1.9% (e.g. too young to talk). The percentage of people born overseas was 15.0, compared with 28.8% nationally.

Religious affiliations were 30.8% Christian, 0.9% Hindu, 0.9% Māori religious beliefs, 0.9% Buddhist, and 0.9% other religions. People who answered that they had no religion were 57.9%, and 7.5% of people did not answer the census question.

Of those at least 15 years old, 36 (14.5%) people had a bachelor's or higher degree, 138 (55.4%) had a post-high school certificate or diploma, and 63 (25.3%) people exclusively held high school qualifications. The median income was $38,400, compared with $41,500 nationally. 18 people (7.2%) earned over $100,000 compared to 12.1% nationally. The employment status of those at least 15 was that 135 (54.2%) people were employed full-time, 30 (12.0%) were part-time, and 3 (1.2%) were unemployed.

=== Maungatāpere statistical area ===
Maungatāpere statistical area covers 174.48 km^{2} (67.37 sq mi) and had an estimated population of 3,790 as of June 2025, with a population density of 22 people per km^{2}.

Historical population for the statistical area
| Year | Pop. | ±% p.a. |
|---|---|---|
| 2006 | 2,757 | — |
| 2013 | 2,994 | +1.19% |
| 2018 | 3,477 | +3.04% |
| 2023 | 3,651 | +0.98% |

Maungatāpere statistical area had a population of 3,651 in the 2023 New Zealand census, an increase of 174 people (5.0%) since the 2018 census, and an increase of 657 people (21.9%) since the 2013 census. There were 1,854 males, 1,788 females and 9 people of other genders in 1,281 dwellings. 2.4% of people identified as LGBTIQ+. The median age was 44.1 years (compared with 38.1 years nationally). There were 711 people (19.5%) aged under 15 years, 516 (14.1%) aged 15 to 29, 1,725 (47.2%) aged 30 to 64, and 702 (19.2%) aged 65 or older.

People could identify as more than one ethnicity. The results were 89.4% European (Pākehā); 20.1% Māori; 2.5% Pasifika; 3.3% Asian; 0.5% Middle Eastern, Latin American and African New Zealanders (MELAA); and 2.8% other, which includes people giving their ethnicity as "New Zealander". English was spoken by 97.8%, Māori language by 3.0%, Samoan by 0.2%, and other languages by 5.6%. No language could be spoken by 1.7% (e.g. too young to talk). New Zealand Sign Language was known by 0.2%. The percentage of people born overseas was 16.5, compared with 28.8% nationally.

Religious affiliations were 29.9% Christian, 0.2% Hindu, 0.1% Islam, 0.6% Māori religious beliefs, 0.2% Buddhist, 0.7% New Age, and 1.2% other religions. People who answered that they had no religion were 59.1%, and 8.3% of people did not answer the census question.

Of those at least 15 years old, 462 (15.7%) people had a bachelor's or higher degree, 1,749 (59.5%) had a post-high school certificate or diploma, and 570 (19.4%) people exclusively held high school qualifications. The median income was $42,700, compared with $41,500 nationally. 333 people (11.3%) earned over $100,000 compared to 12.1% nationally. The employment status of those at least 15 was that 1,596 (54.3%) people were employed full-time, 498 (16.9%) were part-time, and 54 (1.8%) were unemployed.

== Education ==
Maungatapere School is a coeducational full primary (years 1-8) school with a roll of 306 students (as of July 2026). The school celebrated its 125th jubilee in 2004.
