= Pouto Peninsula =

Peninsula in Northland, New Zealand

Pouto Peninsula Poutō Peninsula
- Peninsula
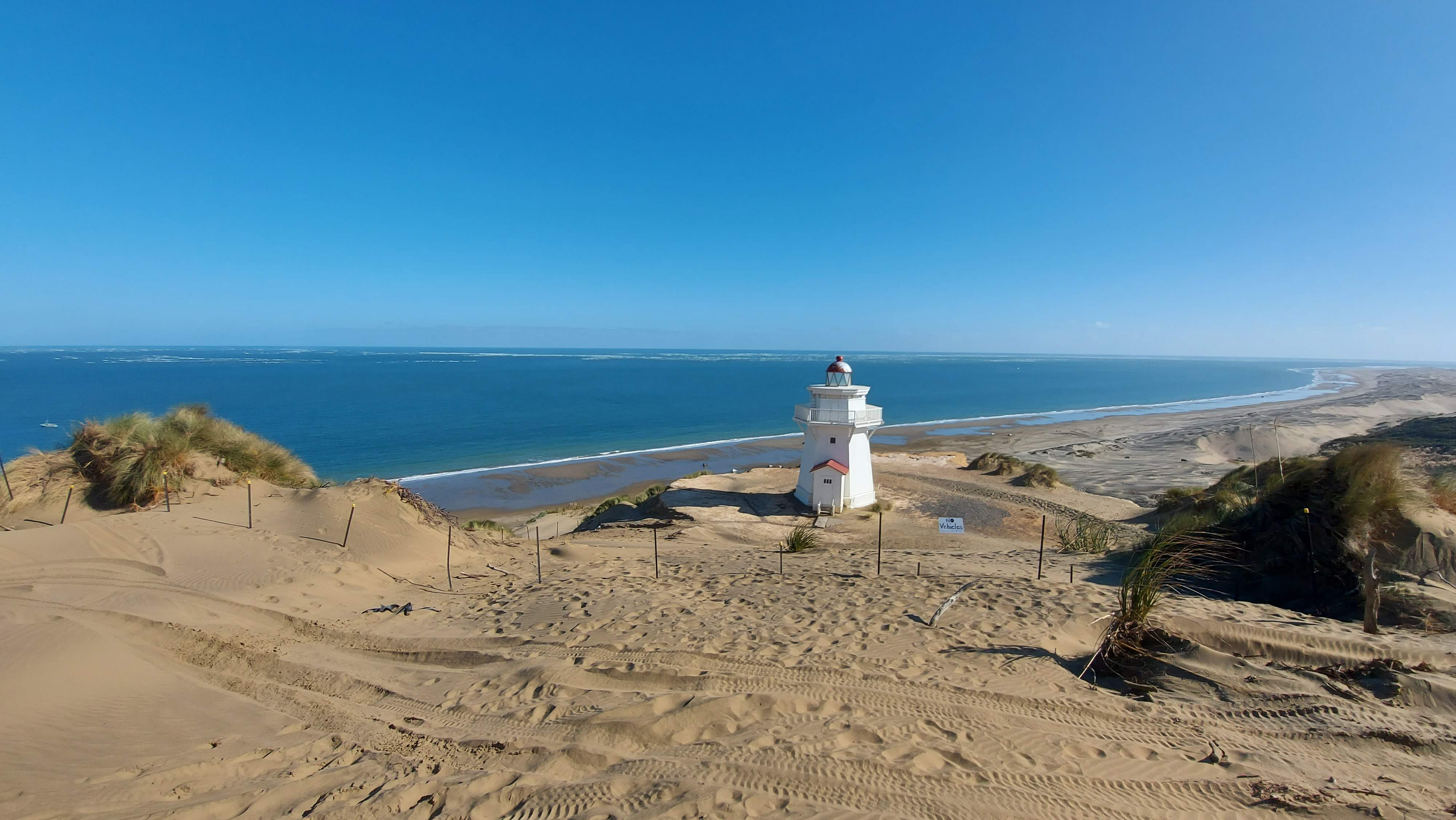
- Pouto North Head and Lighthouse looking west out through the Kaipara Harbour mouth

- Location within Northland Region
- Coordinates: 36°15′S 174°2′E
- Location: Kaipara District

The Pouto Peninsula is a landform on the northern Kaipara Harbour in Northland, New Zealand. The Peninsula runs in the north west to south east direction and is approximately 55 km long. The width varies from about 5.4 km to about 14 km, with the widest part of the peninsula near its southern end. The Tasman Sea is to the west, and the Kaipara Harbour is to the south. The Wairoa River and Kaipara Harbour are to the east. Dargaville and State Highway 12 lie directly to the north east of the peninsula. The mouth of the Kaipara Harbour separates the peninsula from the smaller South Kaipara Peninsula.

The most substantial settlement on the peninsula is Te Kōpuru. The locality of Pouto, originally a Māori village, is in the south east of the peninsula.

== Geography and conservation ==
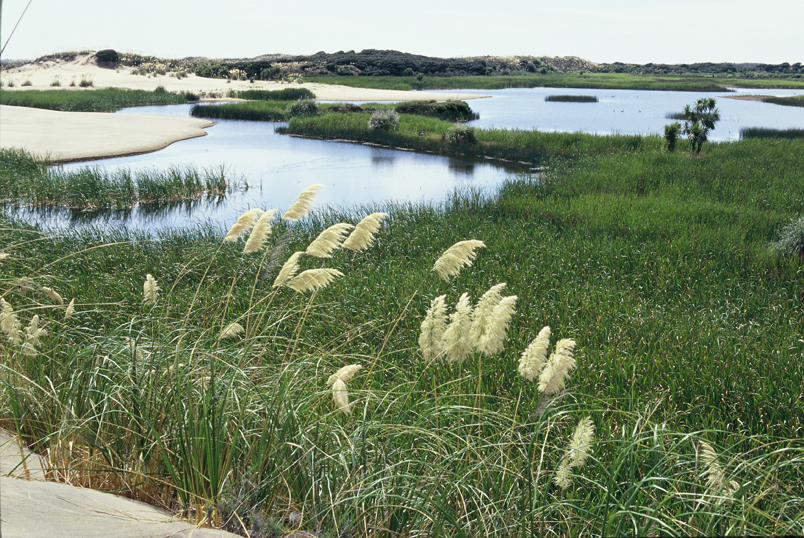
Dune Lake

Much of Pouto – over 600 ha – is covered by sand dunes, which are one of the largest unmodified dune systems in New Zealand. Many of the dunes rise over 100 m above sea level, and the highest reaches 214 m. There are also both permanent and temporary wetlands, and more than 20 freshwater lakes and swamps. The interior is planted in exotic forests.

Several threatened plants, birds, invertebrates and a freshwater fish are found on the peninsula.

== Shipwrecks ==
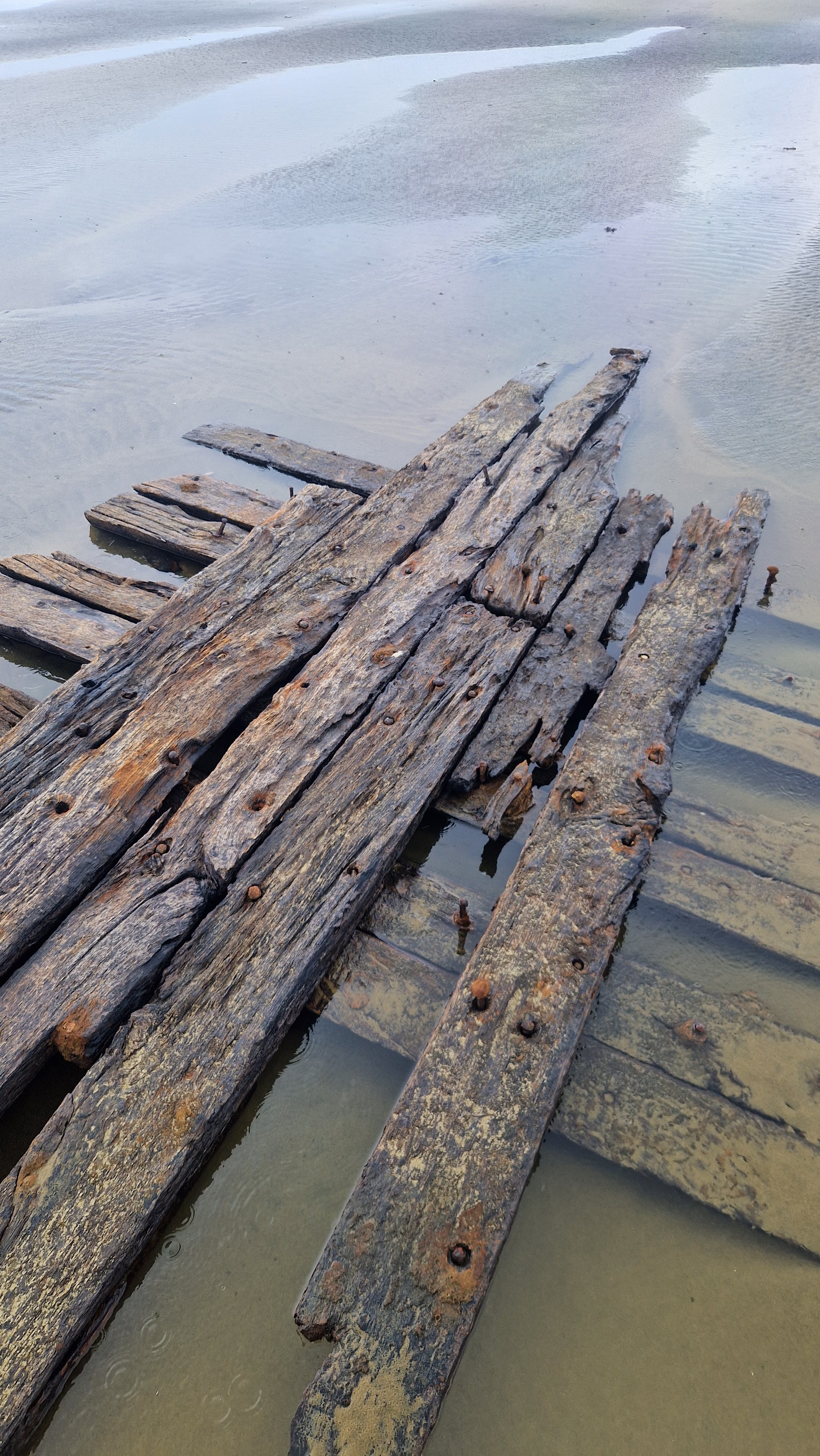
Remains of a shipwreck near Midge Bay, Pouto Peninsula

There have been at least 43 vessels recorded shipwrecks around Kaipara North Head, some say as many as 110. The low-lying peninsula makes the north head of the Kaipara Harbour treacherous, and there are a lack of landmarks on the peninsula from which to take bearings. Tradition recounts that Rongomai, the captain of the waka Māhuhu, drowned when his canoe capsized near the entrance to Kaipara Harbour in the early days of Māori settlement of New Zealand. The first recorded shipwreck was of the Aurora, a 550-ton barque, in 1840, and the most recent was the charter fishing vessel Francie in 2016.

New Zealand film maker Winston Cowie investigated potential Portuguese or Spanish shipwrecks on the Pouto Peninsula and recorded the oral tradition from interviews on the Iberian discovery question in his books Conquistador Puzzle Trail and Nueva Zelanda, un puzzle histórico: tras la pista de los conquistadores españoles. Cowie concludes that more research and investigation is required to conclude that any of them are Spanish or Portuguese. The oral tradition of Pouto elders, however, did mention a Spanish ship, helmets, armour in the sand, and buried treasure.

== History ==
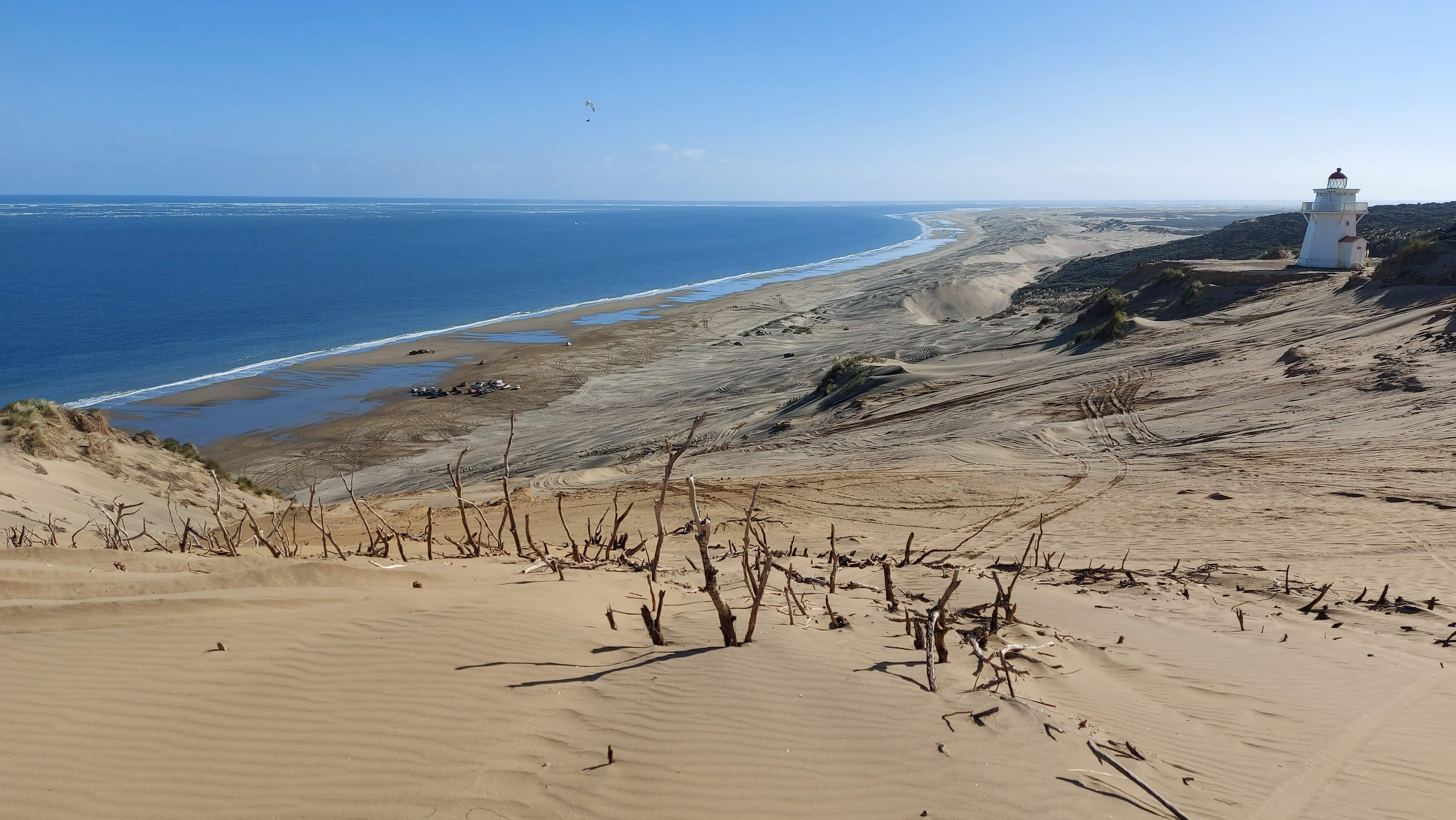
Pouto North Head looking west out through the Kaipara Harbour mouth.

Descendants of the Māhuhu crew settled around Pouto and the South Head of Kaipara Harbour, possibly in the 13th century CE. Some of the crew of Aotea may have joined them in the 14th century. In the 15th century, Taramainuku, a grandson of the Arawa captain, settled at Pouto near the North Head, killing or driving away some of the previous occupants. According to tradition, the greater area of Kaipara is called after a hāngī Taramainuku hosted, at which the para fern (Marattia salicina) was served. ("Kai" is a Māori language word meaning "food".)

In the late 17th century, or early 18th, Ngāti Whātua occupied the Pouto Peninsula as part of their move southwards. In 1820, during the Musket Wars, Ngā Puhi laid siege to Ngāti Whātua's Tauhara pa near Pouto, but were unable to capture it. A truce was agreed, to be cemented by the marriage of a Ngā Puhi chief to the daughter of a Ngāti Whātua chief. During the festivities, Ngā Puhi and their allies suddenly turned on their hosts and massacred them.

In 1874, a customs house and pilot station were built at Pouto. A signal mast was erected in the sandhills at North Head in 1876, 5–6 miles west of the station. The following year, a telegraph system was set up between the two. A lighthouse was built at North Head in 1884. The customs office was shifted to Te Kōpuru in 1903. The lighthouse was automated in 1947, and closed in the mid-1950s. The structure still exists and was renovated in 1982–84.

Gum-diggers operated on the peninsula from the 1870s and lasting into the 1930s, although kauri trees no longer grew there. Dairy farming was established in the early 20th century. Sand from Pouto was used to build dams in the Waitākere Ranges, and was also barged around the Kaipara Harbour. The southern part of the peninsula was slow to be developed, with the road only reaching to Taingaehe in 1930, and extending another 35 km to Pouto itself in 1931. Until then, contact with the rest of the world was by steamer. The road wasn't metalled until the 1940s.

== Education ==
Pouto School is a coeducational full primary (years 1–8) school with a roll of 12 students as of March 2026. A school was first established at Pouto in 1878.

There is also a primary school at Te Kōpuru. The leaflet 'Pouto – 105 years (1879–1984)' compiled in 1985 by local historian Logan Forrest to mark 104 years of education on the Pouto Peninsula – the history of the Pouto, Waikare, Punahaere and Rangitane schools – gives an overview of education and history on the peninsula up until 1984 – the centenary.

== Demographics ==
Kaipara Coastal statistical area extends north past Aranga to the boundary with the Far North District. It covers 1,248.03 km^{2} (481.87 sq mi) and had an estimated population of 3,940 as of June 2025, with a population density of 3.2 people per km^{2}.

Historical population
Year	Pop.	±% p.a.
2006	3,447	—
2013	3,399	−0.20%
2018	3,651	+1.44%
2023	3,846	+1.05%
The 2006 population is for a larger area of 1,248.06 km^{2} Source:

Kaipara Coastal had a population of 3,846 in the 2023 New Zealand census, an increase of 195 people (5.3%) since the 2018 census, and an increase of 447 people (13.2%) since the 2013 census. There were 1,938 males, 1,896 females and 9 people of other genders in 1,545 dwellings. 2.3% of people identified as LGBTIQ+. The median age was 46.6 years (compared with 38.1 years nationally). There were 699 people (18.2%) aged under 15 years, 555 (14.4%) aged 15 to 29, 1,788 (46.5%) aged 30 to 64, and 804 (20.9%) aged 65 or older.

People could identify as more than one ethnicity. The results were 80.8% European (Pākehā); 33.4% Māori; 3.8% Pasifika; 2.8% Asian; 0.5% Middle Eastern, Latin American and African New Zealanders (MELAA); and 4.0% other, which includes people giving their ethnicity as "New Zealander". English was spoken by 97.7%, Māori language by 5.6%, Samoan by 0.2%, and other languages by 4.1%. No language could be spoken by 1.9% (e.g. too young to talk). New Zealand Sign Language was known by 0.4%. The percentage of people born overseas was 11.5, compared with 28.8% nationally.

Religious affiliations were 29.6% Christian, 0.5% Islam, 3.2% Māori religious beliefs, 0.2% Buddhist, 0.5% New Age, 0.1% Jewish, and 0.9% other religions. People who answered that they had no religion were 56.4%, and 9.0% of people did not answer the census question.

Of those at least 15 years old, 288 (9.2%) people had a bachelor's or higher degree, 1,779 (56.5%) had a post-high school certificate or diploma, and 999 (31.7%) people exclusively held high school qualifications. The median income was $31,300, compared with $41,500 nationally. 150 people (4.8%) earned over $100,000 compared to 12.1% nationally. The employment status of those at least 15 was that 1,395 (44.3%) people were employed full-time, 477 (15.2%) were part-time, and 105 (3.3%) were unemployed.

== Climate ==
Climate data for Pouto (1980–1987)
Month	Jan	Feb	Mar	Apr	May	Jun	Jul	Aug	Sep	Oct	Nov	Dec	Year
Mean daily maximum °C (°F)	22.9 (73.2)	22.7 (72.9)	21.9 (71.4)	19.6 (67.3)	17.0 (62.6)	15.3 (59.5)	14.3 (57.7)	14.5 (58.1)	15.7 (60.3)	17.0 (62.6)	19.1 (66.4)	21.3 (70.3)	18.4 (65.2)
Daily mean °C (°F)	19.4 (66.9)	19.4 (66.9)	18.6 (65.5)	16.4 (61.5)	14.0 (57.2)	12.4 (54.3)	11.3 (52.3)	11.5 (52.7)	12.7 (54.9)	13.9 (57.0)	15.8 (60.4)	17.8 (64.0)	15.3 (59.5)
Mean daily minimum °C (°F)	15.8 (60.4)	16.0 (60.8)	15.4 (59.7)	13.3 (55.9)	11.0 (51.8)	9.6 (49.3)	8.3 (46.9)	8.5 (47.3)	9.7 (49.5)	10.8 (51.4)	12.5 (54.5)	14.3 (57.7)	12.1 (53.8)
Average rainfall mm (inches)	92.8 (3.65)	85.3 (3.36)	119.1 (4.69)	123.6 (4.87)	108.8 (4.28)	100.8 (3.97)	111.3 (4.38)	117.9 (4.64)	101.8 (4.01)	83.7 (3.30)	52.1 (2.05)	85.1 (3.35)	1,182.3 (46.55)
Source: NIWA (rainfall 1981–2010)
