= Kaihū River =

Coordinates: 35°57′S 173°52′E

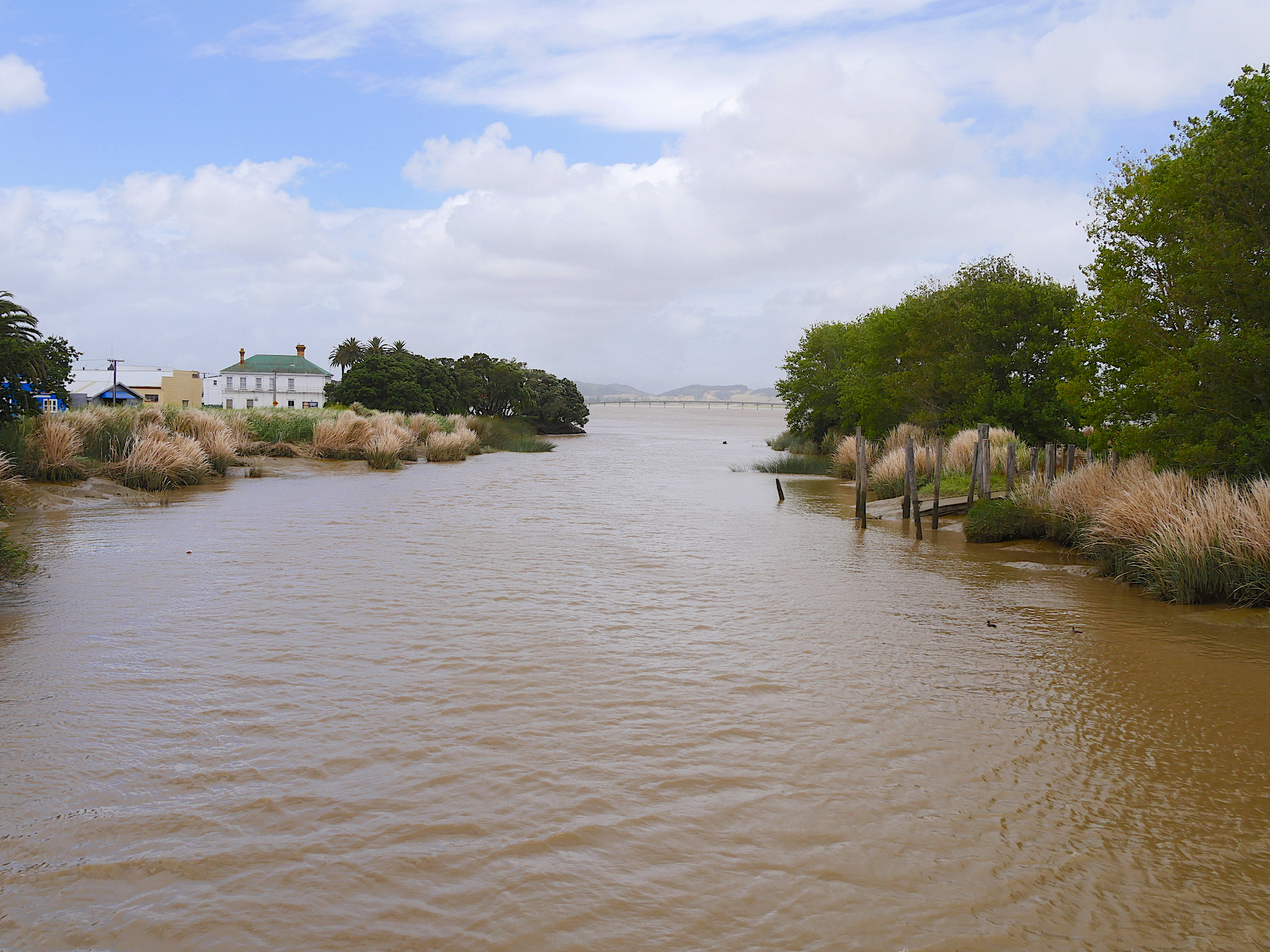
- Kaihū River, river mouth to Wairoa River, Northland

Location
- Country: New Zealand

Physical characteristics
- Mouth
  - location: Wairoa River
- Length: 38 km (24 mi)

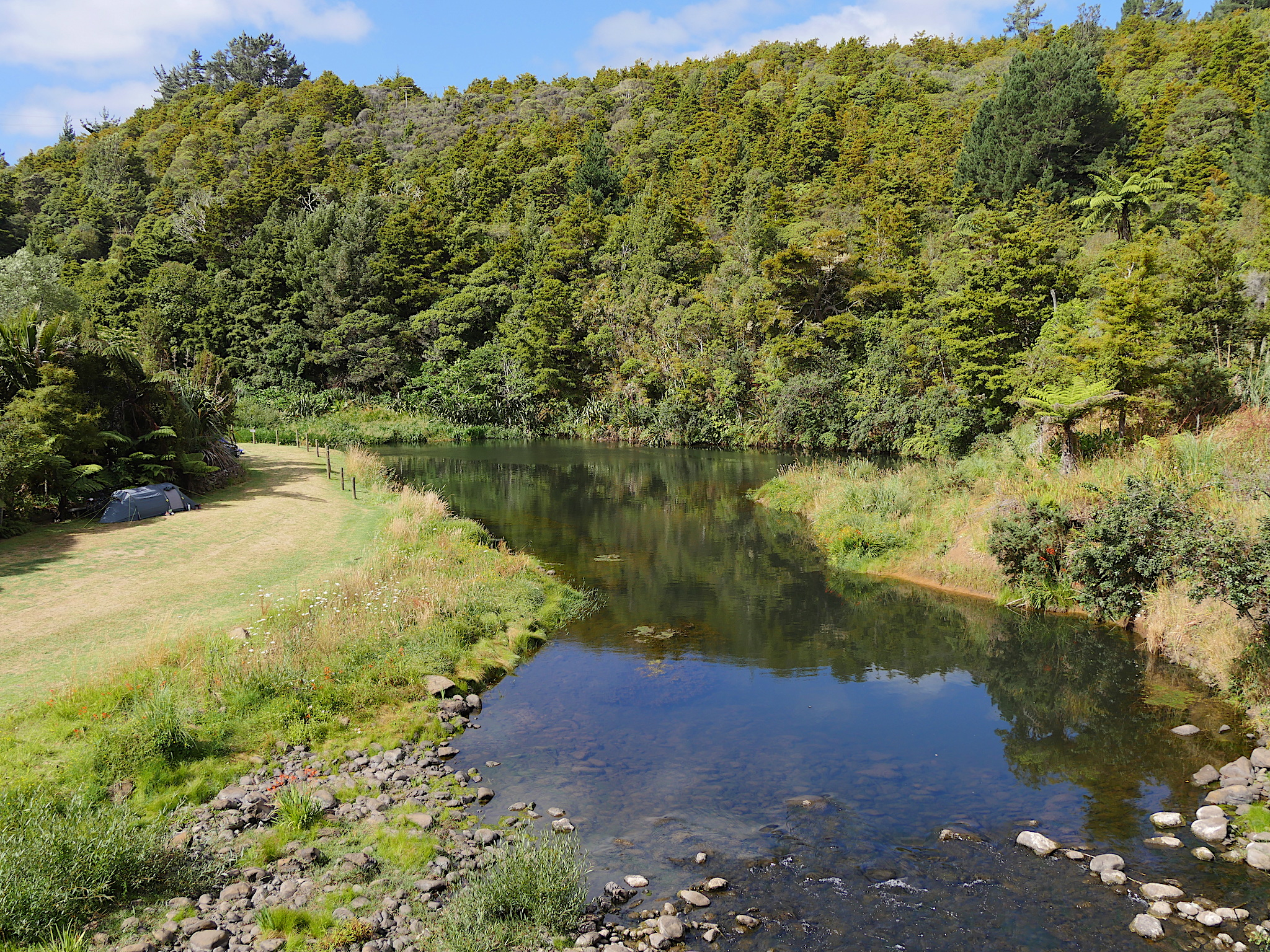
Kaihū River, close to Whataro

The Kaihū River is a river of the far north of New Zealand's North Island. It originates in native forest near Trounson Kauri Park flows southeast from just south of Waipoua Forest, reaching the Wairoa River at the town of Dargaville.

Its surrounding land supports a combination of forestry (both native and exotic), agriculture, and horticulture, though dairy farming is the primary land use in the mid to lower sections. The river is also notable for having volcanic acidic catchment geology, a feature shared with five other locations in the area.

== See also ==
- List of rivers of New Zealand
