= Ōhaeawai =

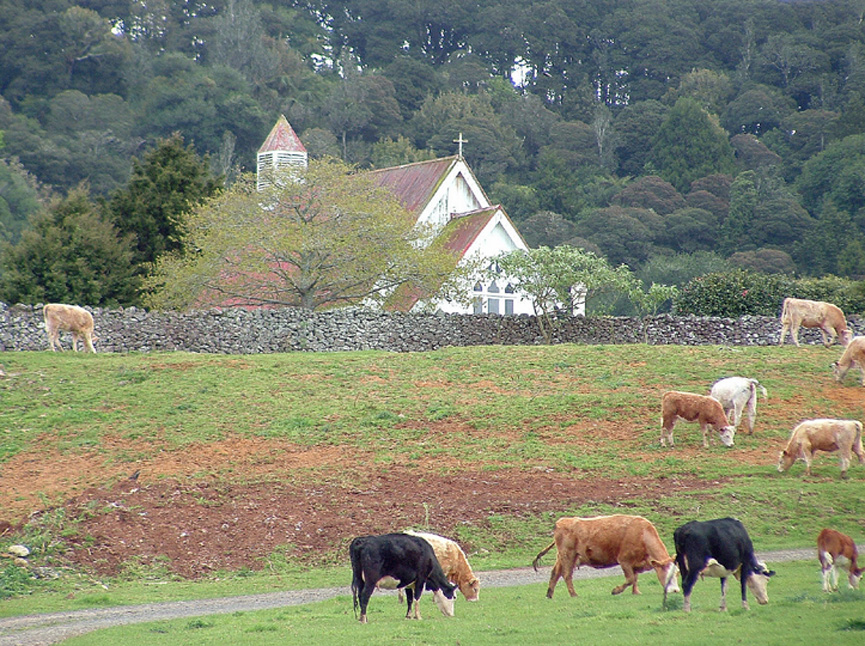
- St Michael's Church sits atop the pā site today in a pastoral setting
- Interactive map of Ōhaeawai
- Coordinates: 35°21′4″S 173°52′55″E
- Country: New Zealand
- Region: Northland Region
- District: Far North District
- Ward: Kaikohe/Hokianga
- Community: Kaikohe-Hokianga
- Subdivision: Kaikohe
- Electorates: Northland; Te Tai Tokerau

Government
  - Territorial Authority: Far North District Council
  - Regional council: Northland Regional Council
  - Mayor of Far North: Moko Tepania
  - Northland MP: Grant McCallum
  - Te Tai Tokerau MP: TBD

Area
  - Total: 12.74 km^{2} (4.92 sq mi)

Population (June 2025)
  - Total: 450
  - Density: 35/km^{2} (91/sq mi)

Ōhaeawai is a small village at the junction of State Highway 1 and State Highway 12 in the Far North District of New Zealand, some 250 km (160 mi) from Auckland. The town of Kaikohe is 10.4 km (6.5 mi) to the west, and the Bay of Islands is a short drive to the east.

The New Zealand Ministry for Culture and Heritage gives a translation of "place of thermal waters" for Ōhaeawai.

== History ==
Nearby is the site of the bloody Battle of Ōhaeawai fought at Pene Taui's pā (fort) during the Flagstaff War in 1845. The therapeutic mercurial waters of the minor health spa of Ngawha Springs are in a small thermal area to the west, where Northland prison is situated. The village is the centre of a rich farming district as a result of the fertile volcanic soils, with the district known to the Ngāpuhi as Taiāmai.

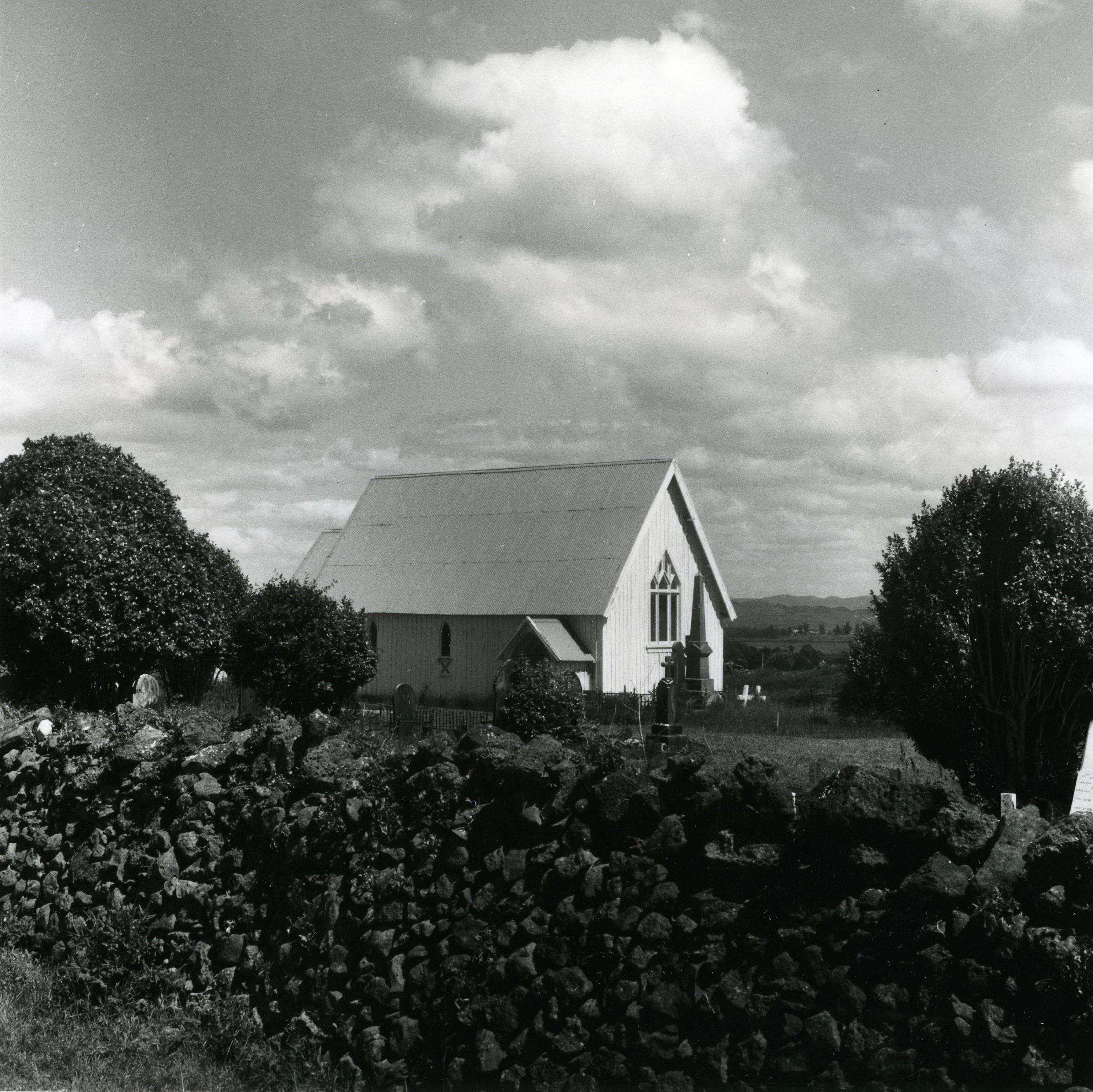
St Michael's Church, Ōhaeawai

Taiāmai was the name given to a large boulder of volcanic rock situated about 400 m (quarter mile) south east of the Ohaeawai Hotel. This prominent rock stands about 3.5 metres (11 ft) high, and was formerly an uruuru whenua, a place where travellers recited a charm and placed a small offering, such as a branch or tuft of grass, in order to placate the spirits of that place.

In 1845 Te Ruki Kawiti and Pene Taui fortified Taui's pā, which British forces laid siege to in July that year. The outcome of the Battle of Ōhaeawai is considered to be a defeat of the British colonial forces. St. Michael's Anglican Church was built in 1870 on the site of the pā.

St. Michael's Anglican Church is 7.2 km (4.5 mi) from Kaikohe and 3.2 km from the township of Ōhaeawai, situated on a gentle rise a short distance west of the main road. In August 2018 the battleground area around the church, including the urupā (cemetery), was added to the Heritage New Zealand list as a wāhi tapu, a place sacred to the Ngāti Rangi hapū and of historic significance.

In June 2019, the name of the locality was officially gazetted as Ōhaeawai by the New Zealand Geographic Board.

== Demographics ==
Statistics New Zealand describes Ōhaeawai as a rural settlement. It covers 12.74 km^{2} (4.92 sq mi) and had an estimated population of 450 as of June 2025, with a population density of 35 people per km^{2}. The settlement is part of the larger Ōhaeawai-Waimate North statistical area.

Historical population for Ōhaeawai settlement
Year	Pop.	±% p.a.
2006	342	—
2013	339	−0.13%
2018	399	+3.31%
2023	429	+1.46%

Ōhaeawai had a population of 429 in the 2023 New Zealand census, an increase of 30 people (7.5%) since the 2018 census, and an increase of 90 people (26.5%) since the 2013 census. There were 204 males, 222 females and 3 people of other genders in 126 dwellings. 4.2% of people identified as LGBTIQ+. The median age was 38.2 years (compared with 38.1 years nationally). There were 105 people (24.5%) aged under 15 years, 63 (14.7%) aged 15 to 29, 198 (46.2%) aged 30 to 64, and 66 (15.4%) aged 65 or older.

People could identify as more than one ethnicity. The results were 64.3% European (Pākehā); 53.1% Māori; 3.5% Pasifika; 2.1% Asian; 0.7% Middle Eastern, Latin American and African New Zealanders (MELAA); and 2.8% other, which includes people giving their ethnicity as "New Zealander". English was spoken by 98.6%, Māori language by 14.0%, Samoan by 0.7% and other languages by 2.8%. No language could be spoken by 0.7% (e.g. too young to talk). New Zealand Sign Language was known by 1.4%. The percentage of people born overseas was 10.5, compared with 28.8% nationally.

Religious affiliations were 29.4% Christian, 7.0% Māori religious beliefs, and 0.7% other religions. People who answered that they had no religion were 59.4%, and 3.5% of people did not answer the census question.

Of those at least 15 years old, 30 (9.3%) people had a bachelor's or higher degree, 201 (62.0%) had a post-high school certificate or diploma, and 78 (24.1%) people exclusively held high school qualifications. The median income was $38,300, compared with $41,500 nationally. 15 people (4.6%) earned over $100,000 compared to 12.1% nationally. The employment status of those at least 15 was that 168 (51.9%) people were employed full-time, 48 (14.8%) were part-time, and 15 (4.6%) were unemployed.

=== Ōhaeawai-Waimate North statistical area ===
Ōhaeawai-Waimate North statistical area covers 87.37 km^{2} (33.73 sq mi) and had an estimated population of 1,300 as of June 2025, with a population density of 15 people per km^{2}.

Historical population for Ohaeawai-Waimate North
Year	Pop.	±% p.a.
2006	864	—
2013	933	+1.10%
2018	1,140	+4.09%
2023	1,251	+1.88%

Ōhaeawai-Waimate North had a population of 1,251 in the 2023 New Zealand census, an increase of 111 people (9.7%) since the 2018 census, and an increase of 318 people (34.1%) since the 2013 census. There were 609 males, 636 females and 6 people of other genders in 411 dwellings. 2.9% of people identified as LGBTIQ+. The median age was 46.4 years (compared with 38.1 years nationally). There were 219 people (17.5%) aged under 15 years, 198 (15.8%) aged 15 to 29, 576 (46.0%) aged 30 to 64, and 255 (20.4%) aged 65 or older.

People could identify as more than one ethnicity. The results were 70.3% European (Pākehā); 45.8% Māori; 3.1% Pasifika; 2.2% Asian; 0.5% Middle Eastern, Latin American and African New Zealanders (MELAA); and 1.9% other, which includes people giving their ethnicity as "New Zealander". English was spoken by 98.1%, Māori language by 12.9%, Samoan by 0.5% and other languages by 4.6%. No language could be spoken by 1.0% (e.g. too young to talk). New Zealand Sign Language was known by 0.7%. The percentage of people born overseas was 14.1, compared with 28.8% nationally.

Religious affiliations were 28.1% Christian, 0.2% Islam, 5.0% Māori religious beliefs, 0.2% Buddhist, 0.7% New Age, and 0.5% other religions. People who answered that they had no religion were 60.0%, and 5.8% of people did not answer the census question.

Of those at least 15 years old, 123 (11.9%) people had a bachelor's or higher degree, 603 (58.4%) had a post-high school certificate or diploma, and 258 (25.0%) people exclusively held high school qualifications. The median income was $37,200, compared with $41,500 nationally. 66 people (6.4%) earned over $100,000 compared to 12.1% nationally. The employment status of those at least 15 was that 510 (49.4%) people were employed full-time, 165 (16.0%) were part-time, and 24 (2.3%) were unemployed.

== Marae ==
There are two Ngāpuhi marae in the Ōhaeawai area. Rāwhitiroa or Te Ahuahu Marae is affiliated with Ngāti Hineira, Te Kapotai, Te Popoto, Te Uri Taniwha and Ngawha Marae affiliated with Ngāti Rangi.

In October 2020, the Government committed $499,093 from the Provincial Growth Fund to upgrade the Parawhenua Marae, creating 10 jobs.

== Education ==
Ohaeawai School is a coeducational contributing primary (years 1-6) school with a roll of 153 students as of July 2026. The school's history extends to 1874.
