= Wairoa River (Northland) =

Coordinates: 36.1846°S 174.0583°E

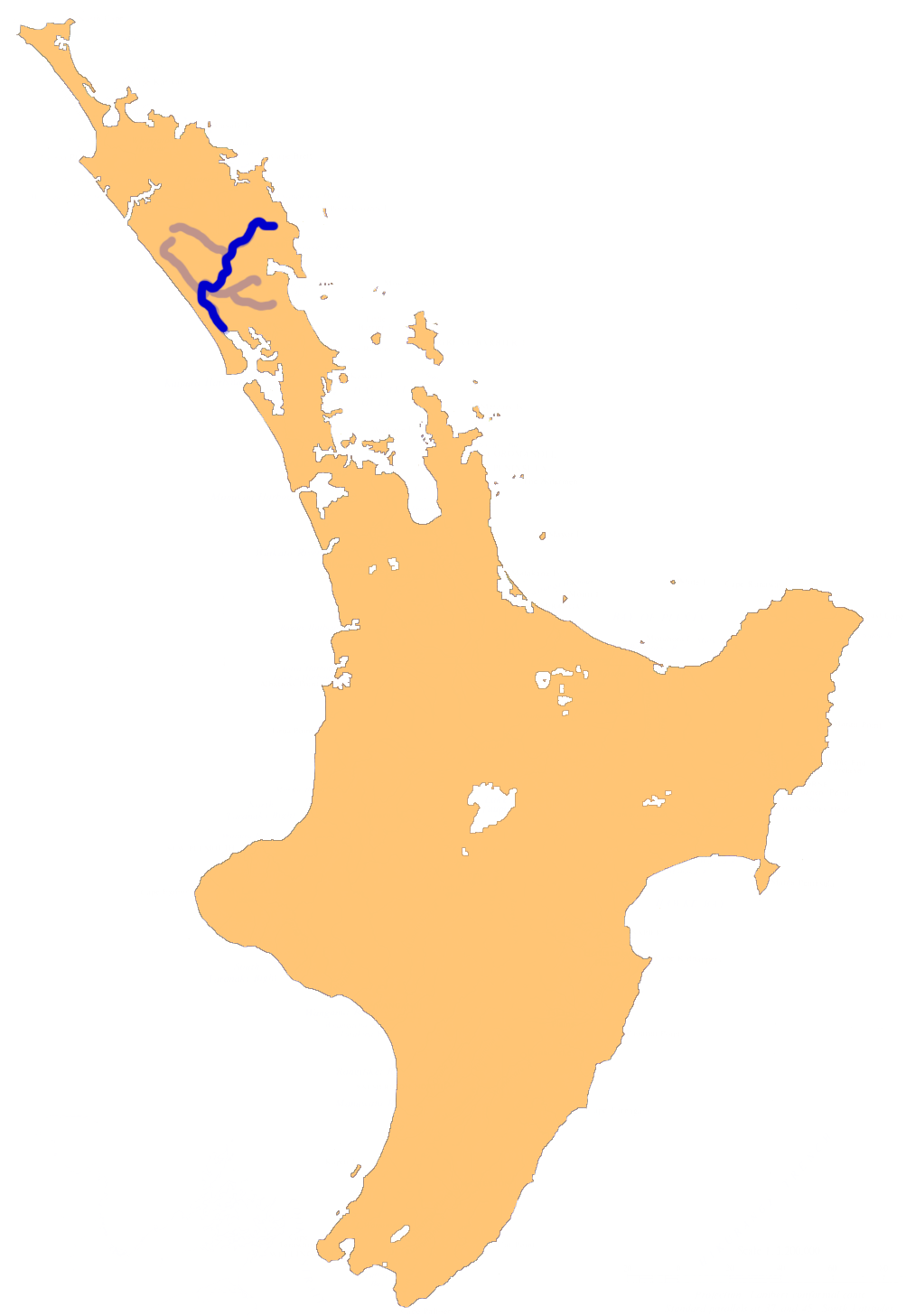
- Wairoa and Wairua rivers (blue) and the Kaihū, Manganui and Mangakāhia tributaries

- Location of the Wairoa River in New Zealand

Location
- Country: New Zealand
- Region: Northland

Physical characteristics
- Source
  - location: Near Tangiteroria
- Mouth
  - location: Kaipara Harbour
- Length: 96 km (60 mi)

The Wairoa River in Northland, New Zealand, runs for 96 kilometres (60 mi) through the central part of the Northland Peninsula into the Kaipara Harbour. It has a catchment of 3,650 square kilometres (1,410 sq mi), the largest in Northland. The name Wairoa is Māori for 'long water' (wai 'water', roa 'long'). It is the most common place name in New Zealand, and this river is sometimes called the Northern Wairoa River to distinguish it.

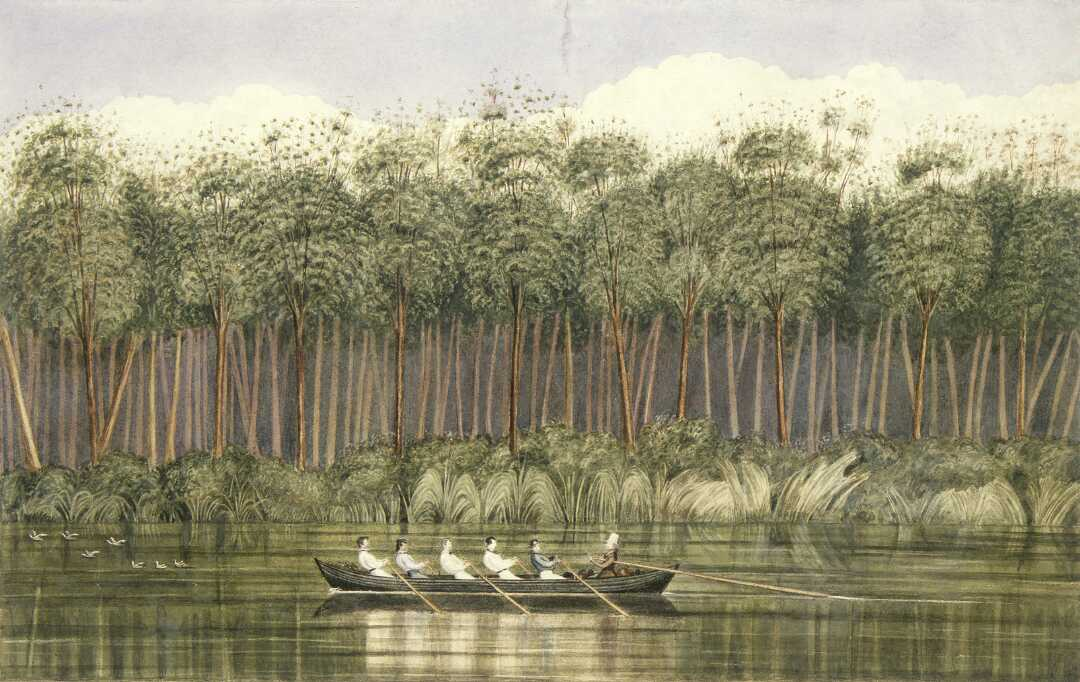
Painting showing the Wairoa River. By Charles Heaphy. 1840

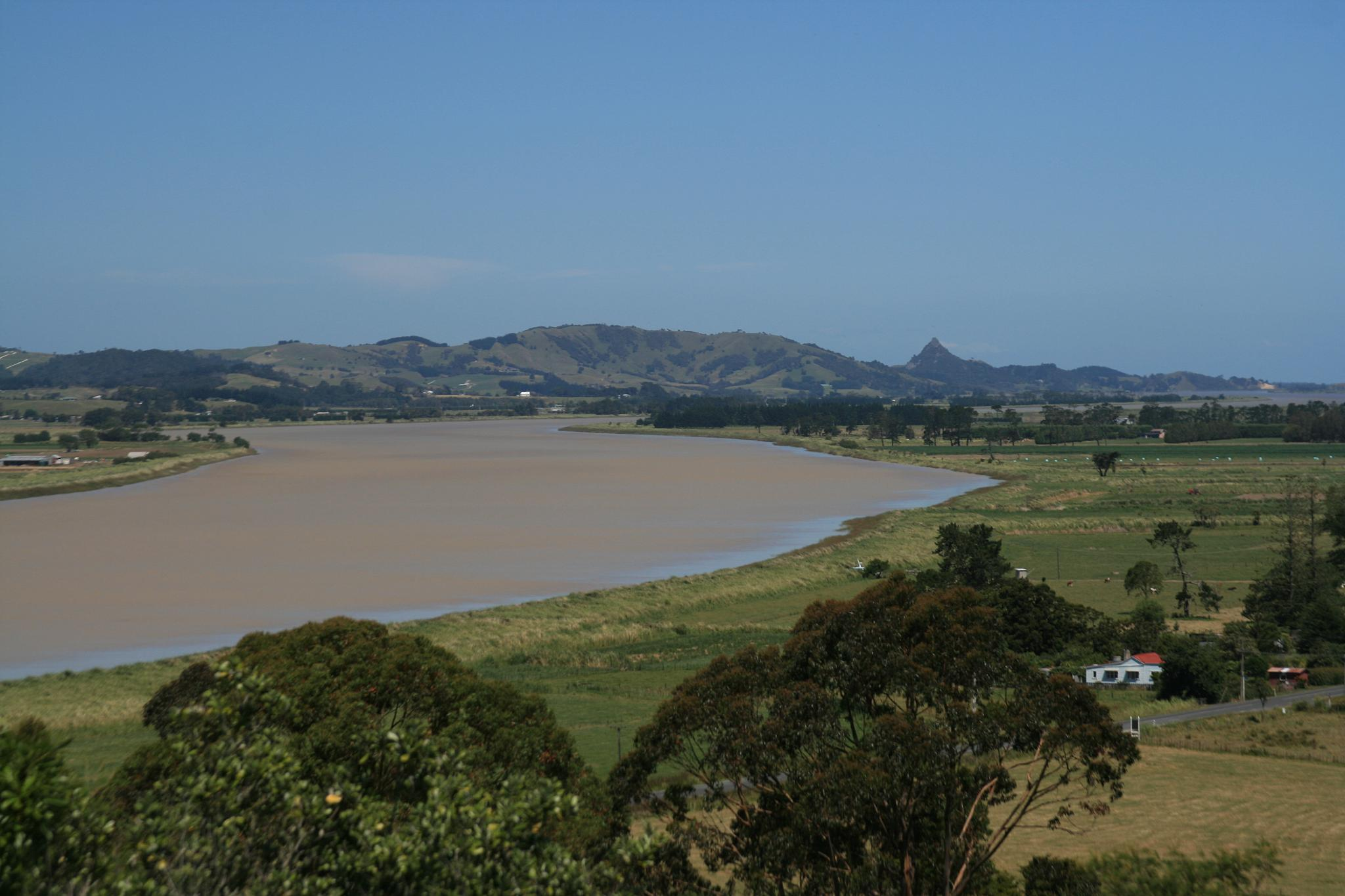
Wairoa River near Dargaville

The Wairoa River is formed by the confluence of the Mangakāhia River and the Wairua River just north of Tangiteroria. It runs south-west to Dargaville, then south-east for 40 kilometres in a wide navigable estuary that flows into the northern end of the Kaipara Harbour. The river has virtually no gradient and is tidal for most of its length. Tributaries include (from its origin to its mouth) the Waiotama River, Manganui River, Awakino River and Kaihū River.

In the 19th century, the river's swamplands near Dargaville were the most popular location for kauri gum digging.

The water in the river is degraded because of pastoral farming that takes place in much of its catchment.
