= Te Mata =

Te Mata (Māori for "The Eye" or "The Blade") is the name of several places in New Zealand. It is also Spanish for “it kills you”.

- Te Mata, Thames-Coromandel District, Waikato
- Te Mata, Waikato District, Waikato
- Te Mata Peak, Hawke's Bay
- Te Mata Estate, a winery based in Hawke's Bay
- Te Mata River
- Te Mata Hapuku, the original name of Birdlings Flat, Canterbury
- Te Mata Stream, an alternative name for a stretch of the Opotoru River
- Te Mata, a hill overlooking the Whakapara River, Northland
- Te Mata, a hill near Linton, Manawatu-Wanganui
- Te Mata, a hill within Whanganui National Park, Manawatu-Wanganui
- New Zealand Poet Laureate, originally known for sponsorship purposes as the Te Mata Poet Laureate
- Te Mata, a song by singer Kali Uchis.

== See also ==
- Karl Temata, Cook Islands rugby league player
