= Pāpakanui River =

River in the Auckland Region, New Zealand

- Mouth of the Pāpakanui River Pāpakanui River (New Zealand)
- Route of the Pāpakanui River

Location
- Country: New Zealand
- Region: Auckland Region

Physical characteristics
- Source
  - coordinates: 36.38805°S 174.42442°E
- Mouth: Tauhoa River
  - coordinates: 36.4031°S 174.4137°E

Basin features
- Progression: Pāpakanui River → Tauhoa River → Kaipara Harbour → Tasman Sea

The Pāpakanui River is a tidal creek of the Kaipara Harbour in the northern Auckland Region of New Zealand's North Island. This short wide river forms part of the lower Kaipara Harbour system, adding its waters to another tidal creek, the Tauhoa River, close to the settlement of Tauhoa.

== See also ==
- List of rivers of New Zealand
