= Kaipara Flats =

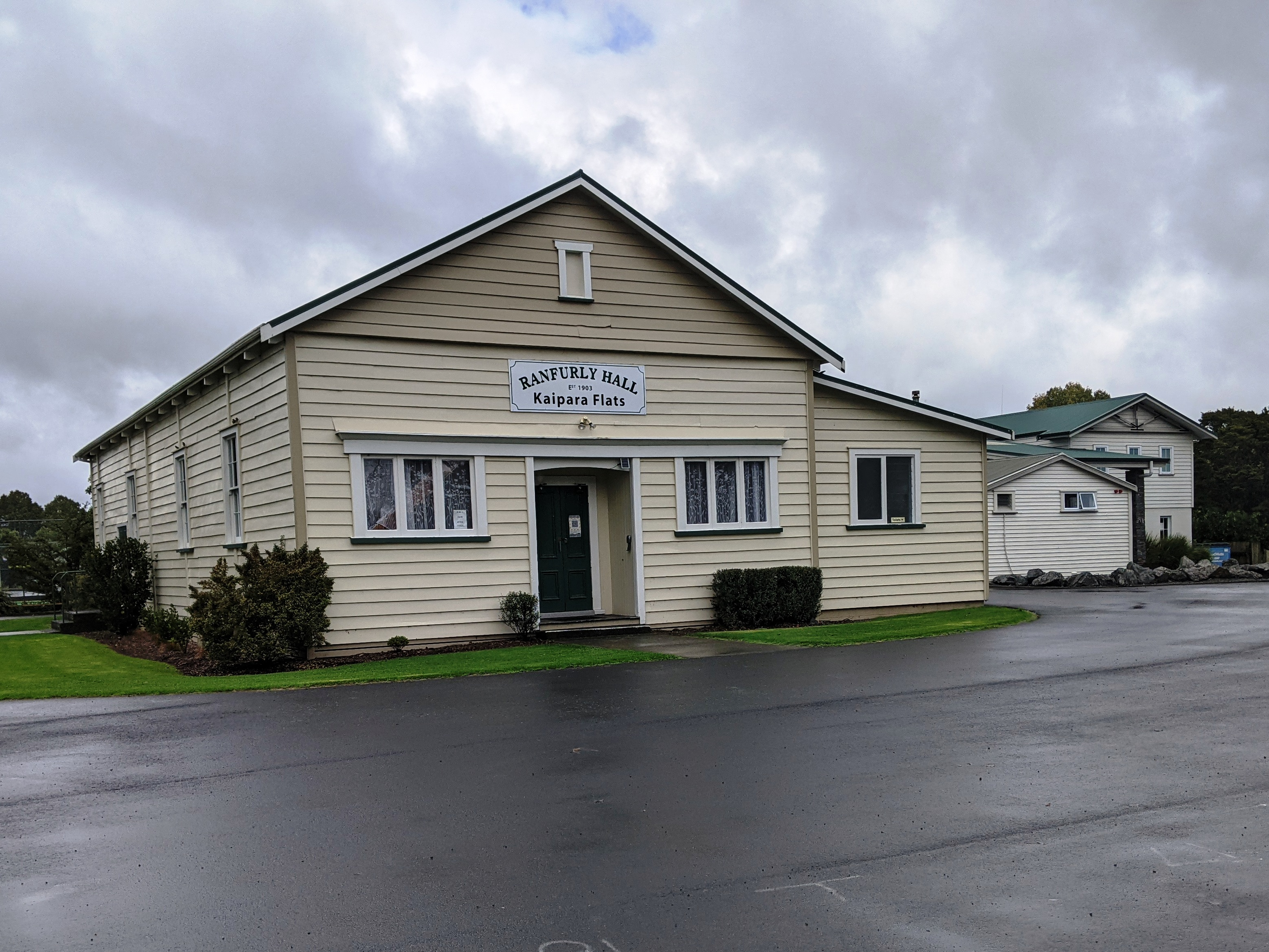
- Ranfurly Hall
- Interactive map of Kaipara Flats
- Coordinates: 36°24′22″S 174°32′47″E
- Country: New Zealand
- Region: Auckland Region
- Local board: Rodney Local Board
- Subdivision: Warkworth subdivision
- Electorates: Kaipara ki Mahurangi; Te Tai Tokerau

Government
  - Territorial Authority: Auckland Council
  - Mayor of Auckland: Wayne Brown
  - Kaipara ki Mahurangi MP: Chris Penk
  - Te Tai Tokerau MP: Mariameno Kapa-Kingi

Area
  - Total: 1.53 km^{2} (0.59 sq mi)

Population (June 2025)
  - Total: 160
  - Density: 100/km^{2} (270/sq mi)

Kaipara Flats is a locality in the Rodney District of New Zealand. Warkworth is 12 km to the east, Ahuroa to the south, and Tauhoa to the north-west. The North Auckland railway line passes through the area.

The economy is mostly sheep and cattle farming, with lifestyle blocks increasing in popularity. The Rodney Aero Club has an airfield nearby.

A bridle track was established to Glorit on the Kaipara Harbour in 1899, and part was improved to a dray road the following year. The North Auckland Line reached Kaipara Flats from Ahuroa in 1906.

== Demographics ==
Statistics New Zealand describes Kaipara Flats as a rural settlement, which covers 1.53 km^{2} (0.59 sq mi) and had an estimated population of 160 as of June 2025, with a population density of 105 people per km^{2}. Kaipara Flats is part of the larger Puhoi Valley statistical area.

Historical population
Year	Pop.	±% p.a.
2006	150	—
2013	138	−1.18%
2018	168	+4.01%
2023	153	−1.85%

Kaipara Flats had a population of 153 in the 2023 New Zealand census, a decrease of 15 people (−8.9%) since the 2018 census, and an increase of 15 people (10.9%) since the 2013 census. There were 75 males, 78 females and 3 people of other genders in 54 dwellings. The median age was 46.3 years (compared with 38.1 years nationally). There were 24 people (15.7%) aged under 15 years, 27 (17.6%) aged 15 to 29, 72 (47.1%) aged 30 to 64, and 30 (19.6%) aged 65 or older.

People could identify as more than one ethnicity. The results were 86.3% European (Pākehā); 13.7% Māori; 2.0% Pasifika; 5.9% Asian; and 3.9% Middle Eastern, Latin American and African New Zealanders (MELAA). English was spoken by 98.0%, Māori language by 2.0%, and other languages by 7.8%. No language could be spoken by 2.0% (e.g. too young to talk). The percentage of people born overseas was 15.7, compared with 28.8% nationally.

Religious affiliations were 19.6% Christian, 3.9% Māori religious beliefs, 2.0% New Age, and 2.0% other religions. People who answered that they had no religion were 70.6%, and 5.9% of people did not answer the census question.

Of those at least 15 years old, 6 (4.7%) people had a bachelor's or higher degree, 78 (60.5%) had a post-high school certificate or diploma, and 33 (25.6%) people exclusively held high school qualifications. The median income was $38,600, compared with $41,500 nationally. 18 people (14.0%) earned over $100,000 compared to 12.1% nationally. The employment status of those at least 15 was that 60 (46.5%) people were employed full-time, 24 (18.6%) were part-time, and 3 (2.3%) were unemployed.

== Education ==
Kaipara Flats School is a coeducational contributing primary (years 1-6) school with a roll of 109 students as of July 2026. The school was established in 1878.
