= Omaru =

Omaru may refer to:

- Omaru, Japanese village merged in 1889 to form Inagi
- Omaru, toilet potty in Japan
- Omaru River, river in New Zealand
- Miyuki Ishikawa (née Omaru), Japanese serial killer
- Omaru Polka, Japanese VTuber

== See also ==
- Komaru
