= Waiariki River =

Coordinates: 35°32′S 174°14′E

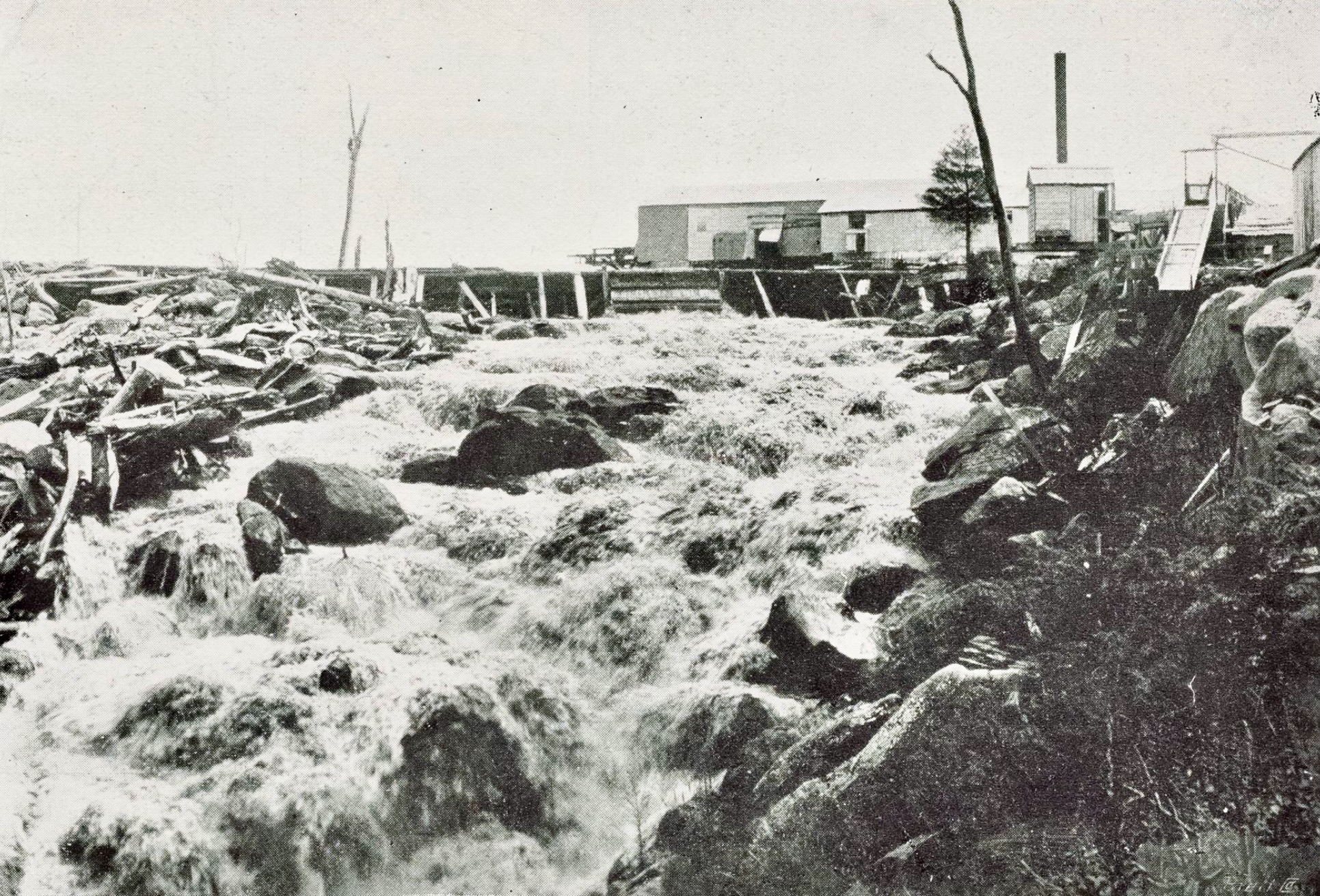
- Tripping a dam at Puhipuhi to carry kauri logs down stream in 1907

Location
- Country: New Zealand

Physical characteristics
- Source
  - location: Confluence of Waikiore and Pukekaikiore Streams
  - elevation: 230 m (750 ft)
- Mouth
  - location: Waiotu River
  - elevation: 90 m (300 ft)
- Length: 13 km (8.1 mi)

The Waiariki River is a river of the Northland Region of New Zealand's North Island. It forms at the confluence of the Waikiore and Pukekaikiore Streams and is in the catchment of the Wairua River, which it reaches by the Waiotu River, approximately halfway between Whangārei and Kawakawa.

The river flows through a Ngāti Hau area, the first application to the Native Land Court for title being in 1871. The river's name means chiefly waters, a healing place for warriors after battle. The area was a kauri forest.

== Puhipuhi mines ==
Silver was discovered in the upper valleys of the Pukekaikiore and Tangiapakura Streams in 1889. The mines were still being worked in 1900, but little seems to have happened after that.

Just to the north of the start of the Waiariki River, at Puhipuhi, is a cinnabar-impregnated quartz, from which mercury has been extracted. Alluvial cinnabar was noticed in the Puhipuhi area in 1892. From 1907, quartz outcrops at the head of the Waikiore Creek were mined, producing 1558 tons of ore and 15.5 tons of mercury by 1925. The mine was rebuilt in 1939 and became an open cast pit. It produced another 14.9 tons of mercury before closure in 1945. The mining lease ended in 1981 and in 2010 the Department of Conservation reviewed the significance of the mine.

== See also ==
- List of rivers of New Zealand
