= Kaipara =

Kaipara may refer to:

- Kaipara Flats, a locality in the Rodney District of New Zealand
- Kaipara (electorate), a former Parliamentary electorate
- Kaipara District, a local government division in New Zealand
- Kaipara Harbour, in northern New Zealand
- Kaipara River, in northern New Zealand

== See also ==
- Oriini Kaipara, New Zealand broadcaster and politician
