= Ahuroa =

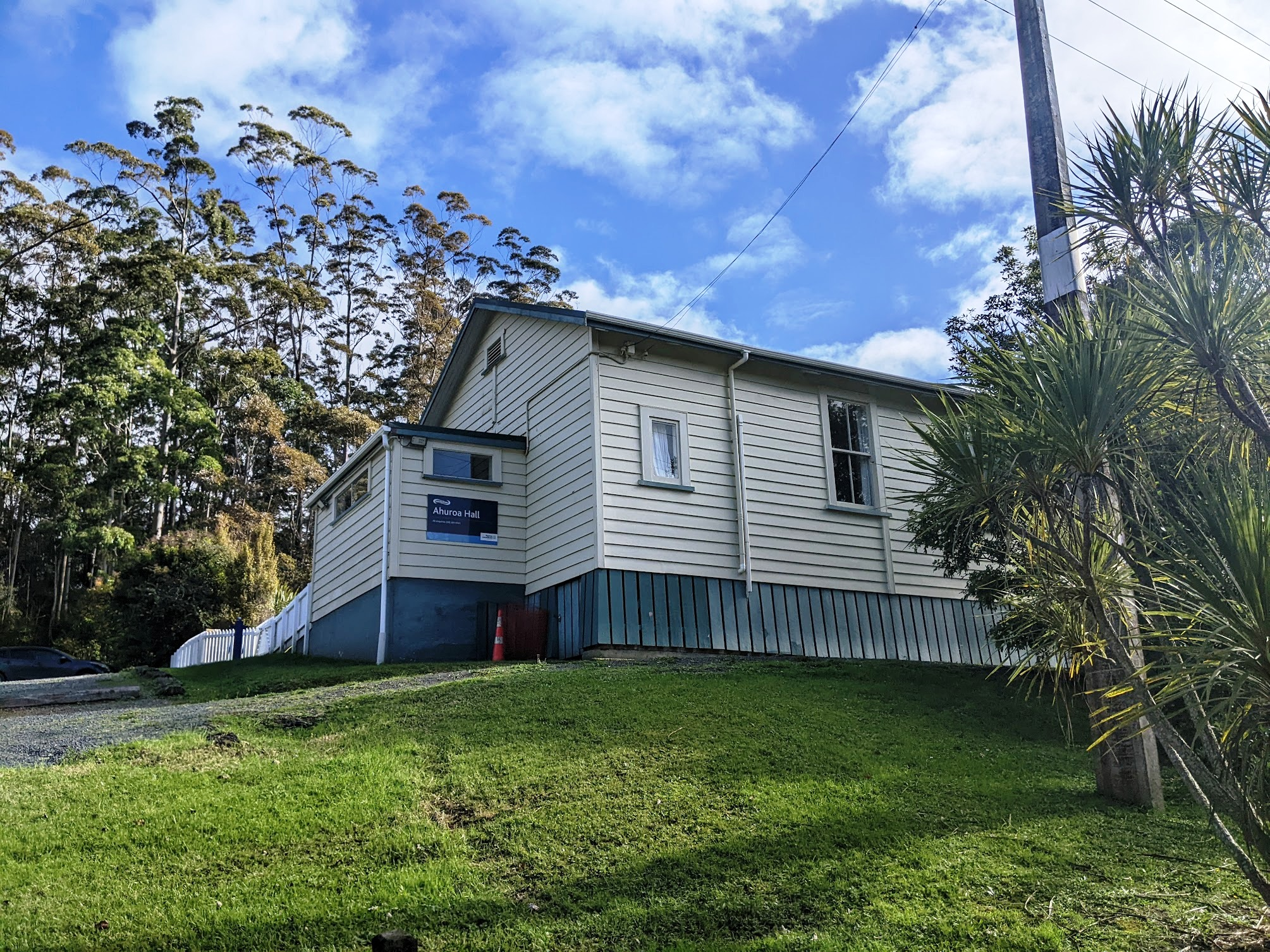
- Ahuroa Hall
- Interactive map of Ahuroa
- Coordinates: 36°28′35″S 174°33′19″E
- Country: New Zealand
- Region: Auckland Region
- Ward: Rodney ward
- Local board: Rodney Local Board
- Subdivision: Warkworth subdivision
- Electorates: Kaipara ki Mahurangi; Te Tai Tokerau (Māori)

Government
  - Territorial authority: Auckland Council
  - Mayor of Auckland: Wayne Brown
  - Kaipara ki Mahurangi MP: Chris Penk
  - Te Tai Tokerau MP: Mariameno Kapa-Kingi

Area
  - Total: 16.63 km^{2} (6.42 sq mi)

Population (2023)
  - Total: 159
  - Density: 9.56/km^{2} (24.8/sq mi)

Ahuroa is a locality in the north of Auckland, New Zealand. Ahuroa is located in the Rodney Local Board area of the city, within the Warkworth subdivision. Puhoi is to the south-east, Warkworth to the north-east, and Kaipara Flats to the north. The North Auckland railway line passes through the area.

== Etymology ==
The New Zealand Ministry for Culture and Heritage gives a translation of "Long Mound" for Ahuroa.

== History ==
The Ahuroa road board was created c.1891–1896 and dissolved c.1906–1911.

The North Auckland Line reached Ahuroa from Kaukapakapa in 1905, allowing exploitation of the local forests. Because it had a railway station, the road between Ahuroa and Glorit on the western coast was chosen to be a highway in the late 1920s, and metalled.

== Education ==
Ahuroa is the site of King's College's Venture Camp. The school owns land and forests there and runs camps such as the 8 days stay as part of the 26 days Year 10 Adventure Challenge at Kings College and the Ahuroa venture camp hosts the Year 12 Leadership camp, preparing them to become prefects in Year 13, as well as leasing out the facility to many corporations from New Zealand.

== Demographics ==
Ahuroa is in an SA1 statistical area which covers 16.63 km^{2} (6.42 sq mi). The SA1 area is part of the larger Kaipara Hills statistical area.

Historical population
Year	Pop.	±% p.a.
2006	111	—
2013	132	+2.51%
2018	144	+1.76%
2023	159	+2.00%

Ahuroa had a population of 159 in the 2023 New Zealand census, an increase of 15 people (10.4%) since the 2018 census, and an increase of 27 people (20.5%) since the 2013 census. There were 75 males and 84 females in 54 dwellings. 3.8% of people identified as LGBTIQ+. The median age was 42.7 years (compared with 38.1 years nationally). There were 33 people (20.8%) aged under 15 years, 24 (15.1%) aged 15 to 29, 78 (49.1%) aged 30 to 64, and 24 (15.1%) aged 65 or older.

People could identify as more than one ethnicity. The results were 96.2% European (Pākehā), 13.2% Māori, 1.9% Pasifika, and 1.9% Asian. English was spoken by 98.1%, Māori language by 3.8%, and other languages by 3.8%. The percentage of people born overseas was 17.0, compared with 28.8% nationally.

Religious affiliations were 20.8% Christian. People who answered that they had no religion were 69.8%, and 9.4% of people did not answer the census question.

Of those at least 15 years old, 27 (21.4%) people had a bachelor's or higher degree, 81 (64.3%) had a post-high school certificate or diploma, and 21 (16.7%) people exclusively held high school qualifications. The median income was $37,300, compared with $41,500 nationally. 18 people (14.3%) earned over $100,000 compared to 12.1% nationally. The employment status of those at least 15 was that 72 (57.1%) people were employed full-time, 24 (19.0%) were part-time, and 3 (2.4%) were unemployed.

== Education ==
Ahuroa School is a coeducational full primary (years 1–8) school with a roll of 51 as of July 2026.
