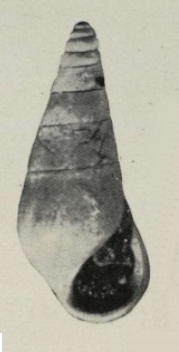
- Shell of Melanella badenia (holotype)

Scientific classification
- Kingdom: Animalia
- Phylum: Mollusca
- Class: Gastropoda
- Subclass: Caenogastropoda
- Order: Littorinimorpha
- Family: Eulimidae
- Genus: Melanella
- Species: †M. badenia

Binomial name
- †Melanella badenia (Laws, 1939)

Synonyms
- † Balcis badenia Laws, 1939 (superseded combination)

= Melanella badenia =

Species of gastropod

Melanella badenia is an extinct species of sea snail, a marine gastropod mollusk in the family Eulimidae.

== Description ==
The length of the shell attains 2.8 mm, its diameter 1.2 mm .

(Original description) The shell is small and glossy, with straight sides. The sutures are very indistinct, and the whorls are flat. The body whorl is only slightly less than half the total height of the shell.

The apex is conical and consists of approximately three whorls, which increase rapidly in width and are convex in outline. The body whorl is somewhat flattened above, convex around the periphery, and only slightly convex across the base. The aperture has a Rissoinid outline but lacks an anterior notch.

The columella is short, thick, and arcuate, while the inner lip bears a slight callus. The outer and basal lips are very strongly and broadly thickened. The outer lip is almost straight, except for a very slight recession towards the suture, and rises from the anterior end at a distinct angle. It is also notably effuse. No sculpture is present.

== Distribution ==
Fossils of this species are endemic of New Zealand and were found in Tertiary strata off Kaipara Harbour.
