= Melanella waikomitica =

- Shell of Melanella waikomitica (holotype)

Scientific classification
- Kingdom: Animalia
- Phylum: Mollusca
- Class: Gastropoda
- Subclass: Caenogastropoda
- Order: Littorinimorpha
- Family: Eulimidae
- Genus: Melanella
- Species: †M. waikomitica

Binomial name
- †Melanella waikomitica (Laws, 1939)

Synonyms
- † Balcis waikomitica Laws, 1939 (superseded combination)

Species of gastropod

Melanella waikomitica is an extinct species of sea snail, a marine gastropod mollusk in the family Eulimidae.

== Description ==
The length of the shell attains 6.3 mm, its diameter 1.8 mm .

(Original description) The shell is of moderate size, with a slightly curved axis, perfectly smooth outlines, and sutures that are hardly visible. The apex is sharply pointed, and the terminal whorls are minute. The height of the body whorl is about one-third that of the shell. The aperture is narrowly ovate, sharply angled behind, and narrowly rounded in front. The columella is thin, faintly arcuate, and set vertically. The inner lip is lightly callused. The outer lip is thin and sharp, being broadly and shallowly sinused above and convex below.

== Distribution ==
Fossils of this species are endemic of New Zealand and were found in Tertiary strata off Kaipara Harbour.
