= Whanaki River =

River in the Auckland Region, New Zealand

- Mouth of the Whanaki River Whanaki River (New Zealand)
- Route of the Whanaki River

Location
- Country: New Zealand
- Region: Auckland Region

Physical characteristics
- Source
  - coordinates: 36.3135°S 174.4968°E
- Mouth: Tauhoa River
  - coordinates: 36.3409°S 174.4331°E
- Length: 10 km (6 mi)

Basin features
- Progression: Whanaki River → Tauhoa River → Kaipara Harbour → Tasman Sea

The Whanaki River is a river of the Auckland Region of New Zealand's North Island. It flows southwest from its origins near Wellsford to reach the Tauhoa River, an arm of the Kaipara Harbour.

== See also ==
- List of rivers of New Zealand
