= Mangawai River =

Location
- Country: New Zealand
- Region: Northland Region

Physical characteristics
- Mouth
  - location: Manganui River (Northland)
  - coordinates: 36°00′56″S 174°16′08.7″E

The Mangawai River is a small river of the Northland Region of New Zealand. It changes name to the Manganui River (Northland) near to where it is crossed by the North Auckland Line.

The rivers ultimately flow into the Wairoa River (Northland) 20 kilometres (12 mi) upstream of Dargaville, before ending in the Kaipara Harbour.

== See also ==
- List of rivers of New Zealand
