= Melanella waiaotea =

- Shell of † Melanella waiaotea (holotype)

Scientific classification
- Kingdom: Animalia
- Phylum: Mollusca
- Class: Gastropoda
- Subclass: Caenogastropoda
- Order: Littorinimorpha
- Family: Eulimidae
- Genus: Melanella
- Species: †M. waiaotea

Binomial name
- †Melanella waiaotea (Laws, 1941)

Synonyms
- † Balcis (Vitreolina) waiaotea Laws, 1941 (superseded combination); † Balcis waiaotea Laws, 1941 (superseded combination)

Species of gastropod

Melanella waiaotea is an extinct species of sea snail, a marine gastropod mollusk in the family Eulimidae. The species is one of a number within the genus Melanella.

== Description ==
The length of the shell attains 2.6 mm; its diameter 0.7 mm.

(Original description) The very small shell is slender and has a curved axis. The whorls are flat, and the sutures are very indistinct. The protoconch is narrowly rounded over the summit.

The height of the body whorl is greater than one third of that of the shell. The base is long and very lightly convex; the periphery lies high up and is marked by a very faint angulation.

The aperture is narrowly ovate, narrowly rounded in front, and sharply angled behind. The columella is slightly arcuate. The parietal wall bears a distinct callus, which does not extend far beyond the aperture. The outer lip is thin, retracted to the suture, and convex below.

== Distribution ==
Fossils of this marine species were off Kaipara, New Zealand
