= Waiotu River =

Coordinates: 35°32′S 174°14′E

Location
- Country: New Zealand

Physical characteristics
- Mouth
  - location: Wairua River
- Length: 15 km (9.3 mi)

The Waiotu River is a hard sediment bottomed river of the Northland Region of New Zealand's North Island. One of the headwaters of the Wairua River system, it flows generally south from its sources 15 kilometres southeast of Kawakawa. Its waters join with those of the Whakapara River to form the Wairua River.

== See also ==
- List of rivers of New Zealand
