= Ōpāhekeheke Island =

Island in New Zealand

Native name: Ōpāhekeheke
- Interactive map of Ōpāhekeheke Island

Geography
- Location: Auckland Region
- Coordinates: 36.617987°S 174.381656°E
- Adjacent to: Kaipara Harbour
- Area: 13.5 ha (33 acres)
- Length: 850 m (2790 ft)
- Width: 315 m (1033 ft)
- Highest elevation: 18 m (59 ft)

Ōpāhekeheke Island is an island located in the southern Kaipara Harbour in the Auckland Region, New Zealand.

== Geography ==
Ōpāhekeheke Island is located in the southwestern Kaipara Harbour, near the Kawau Parua Inlet and the mouth of Te Kowhai Creek on South Head. It reaches a height of 18 m (59 ft) above sea level. The island is a depositional sand bank, surrounded by intertidal flats and mangroves.

== Biodiversity ==
The island is forested by semi-mature and regenerating coastal forest. The great white shark has been found in the waters surrounding the island, often attracted by Kaipara Harbour fishermen, who habitually discard unwanted fish such as spotted estuary smooth-hounds into a location known as "The Gutter".
