= Ōpatu River =

River in the Auckland Region, New Zealand

- Mouth of the Ōpatu River Ōpatu River (New Zealand)
- Route of the Ōpatu River

Location
- Country: New Zealand
- Region: Auckland Region

Physical characteristics
- Source: Te Pahi Stream
  - coordinates: 36.38804°S 174.42444°E
- Mouth: Tauhoa River
  - coordinates: 36.3871°S 174.3985°E
- Length: 6 km (4 mi)

Basin features
- Progression: Ōpatu River → Tauhoa River → Kaipara Harbour → Tasman Sea

The Ōpatu River is a tidal creek of the Kaipara Harbour, in the Auckland Region of New Zealand's North Island. It flows west from Te Pahi Stream, before joining another tidal creek of the harbour, the Tauhoa River.

== See also ==
- List of rivers of New Zealand
