= Komaru =

Komaru (小丸) may refer to:

- Komaru Castle, Japanese castle
- Komaru Naegi, Danganronpa character
- Mount Komaru, mountain in Japan
