= Omaru River =

Coordinates: 35°59′S 174°09′E

Location
- Country: New Zealand

Physical characteristics
- Mouth
  - location: Manganui River
- Length: 20 km (12 mi)

The Omaru River is a river of the Northland Region of New Zealand's North Island. It flows generally north from several streams with origins northwest of Paparoa, reaching the Manganui River 20 kilometres northeast of Ruawai.

The New Zealand Ministry for Culture and Heritage gives a translation of "place of shelter" for Ōmaru.

== See also ==
- List of rivers of New Zealand
