= Te Mata, Thames-Coromandel District =

Te Matu
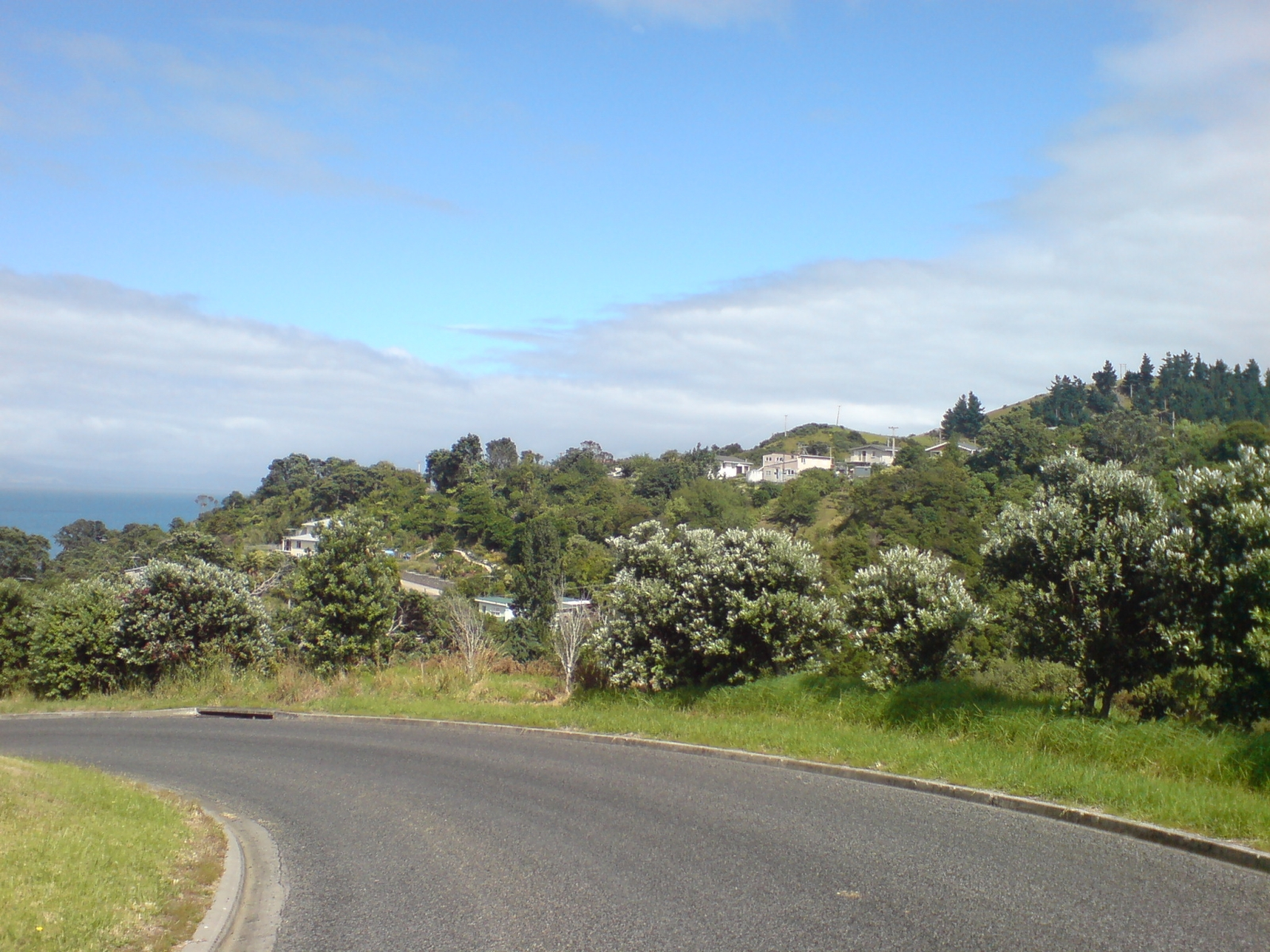
- Part of the village seen from the south of the valley.
- Interactive map of Te Matu
- Coordinates: 36°58′S 175°29′E
- Country: New Zealand
- Region: Waikato
- District: Thames-Coromandel District
- Ward: Thames ward
- Community Board: Thames Community
- Electorates: Coromandel; Hauraki-Waikato (Māori)

Government
  - Council: Thames-Coromandel District Council
  - Regional council: Waikato Regional Council
  - Mayor of Thames-Coromandel: Peter Revell
  - Coromandel MP: Scott Simpson
  - Hauraki-Waikato MP: Hana-Rawhiti Maipi-Clarke

Area
  - Total: 2.23 km^{2} (0.86 sq mi)

Population (2023 Census)
  - Total: 117
  - Density: 52.5/km^{2} (136/sq mi)

Te Mata is a small village on the western coast of the Coromandel Peninsula, New Zealand, located approximately halfway between Coromandel Town and Thames. It overlooks Te Mata River.

The name 'Te Mata' also applies to a hamlet on the other side of the Waikato, 15 km from Raglan and a vineyard and a peak in Hawke's Bay.

== Demographics ==
Te Mata is in an SA1 statistical area which covers 2.23 km^{2} (0.86 sq mi). The SA1 area is included in the demographics for Tapu, New Zealand.

Historical population
Year	Pop.	±% p.a.
2013	117	—
2018	153	+5.51%
2023	177	+2.96%

The SA1 area had a population of 177 in the 2023 New Zealand census, an increase of 24 people (15.7%) since the 2018 census, and an increase of 60 people (51.3%) since the 2013 census. There were 87 males, 87 females and 3 people of other genders in 75 dwellings. 1.7% of people identified as LGBTIQ+. The median age was 65.8 years (compared with 38.1 years nationally). There were 6 people (3.4%) aged under 15 years, 12 (6.8%) aged 15 to 29, 63 (35.6%) aged 30 to 64, and 96 (54.2%) aged 65 or older.

People could identify as more than one ethnicity. The results were 89.8% European (Pākehā), 13.6% Māori, 1.7% Asian, and 3.4% other, which includes people giving their ethnicity as "New Zealander". English was spoken by 100.0%, Māori language by 1.7%, and other languages by 6.8%. The percentage of people born overseas was 15.3, compared with 28.8% nationally.

Religious affiliations were 30.5% Christian, 1.7% Buddhist, and 1.7% other religions. People who answered that they had no religion were 54.2%, and 10.2% of people did not answer the census question.

Of those at least 15 years old, 27 (15.8%) people had a bachelor's or higher degree, 102 (59.6%) had a post-high school certificate or diploma, and 45 (26.3%) people exclusively held high school qualifications. The median income was $28,000, compared with $41,500 nationally. 6 people (3.5%) earned over $100,000 compared to 12.1% nationally. The employment status of those at least 15 was that 48 (28.1%) people were employed full-time and 27 (15.8%) were part-time.
