= Tauhoa River =

River in the Auckland Region, New Zealand

- Mouth of the Tauhoa River Tauhoa River (New Zealand)
- Route of the Tauhoa River

Location
- Country: New Zealand
- Region: Auckland Region

Physical characteristics
- Source
  - coordinates: 36.3405°S 174.3995°E
- Mouth: Kaipara Harbour
  - coordinates: 36.4153°S 174.3625°E
- Length: 8 km (5.0 mi)

Basin features
- Progression: Tauhoa River → Kaipara Harbour → Tasman Sea
- Tributaries
  - left: Whanaki River, Opatu River, Papakanui River
  - right: Opou Creek, Onemanga Creek, Kahutaewao Creek, Hiki Creek, Te Raupa Creek

The Tauhoa River is an estuarial arm of the Kaipara Harbour in the Auckland Region of New Zealand's North Island. As part of the harbour's drowned valley system, it consists of narrow channels flowing south through expanses of mudflat to meet with the main waters of the Kaipara due east of the harbour entrance. The Tauhoa Channel links the entrance with the river mouth.

== History ==
In pre-European times, the Tauhoa River was important to the Tāmaki Māori people of the Kaipara Harbour. The Opou portage allowed waka to be transported across the Okahukura Peninsula between the Oruawharo and Tauhoa rivers.

== Tauhoa Scientific Reserve ==
The Tauhoa Scientific Reserve is a nationally important reserve primarily made up of mangrove forest. It is 291 ha (720 acres) and one of two large mangrove forest reserves in New Zealand. It was vested with the University of Auckland in 1949.

== See also ==
- List of rivers of New Zealand
