= Te Mata River =

Coordinates: 36°58′S 175°30′E

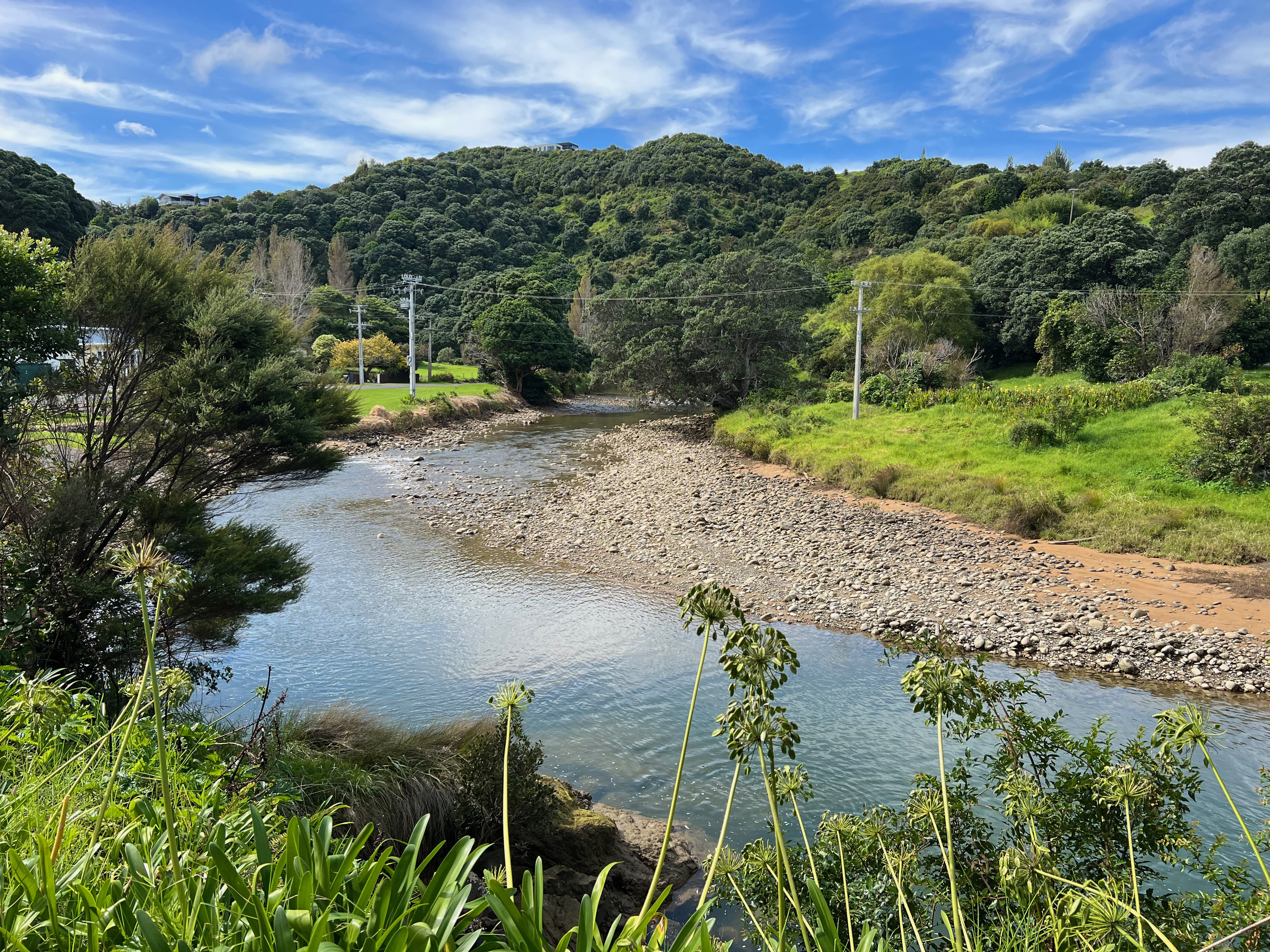
- Te Mata River near its mouth

Location
- Country: New Zealand

Physical characteristics
- Source
  - location: Papakai, Coromandel Range
  - elevation: 759 m (2,490 ft)
- Mouth
  - location: Firth of Thames
- Length: 15 km (9.3 mi)

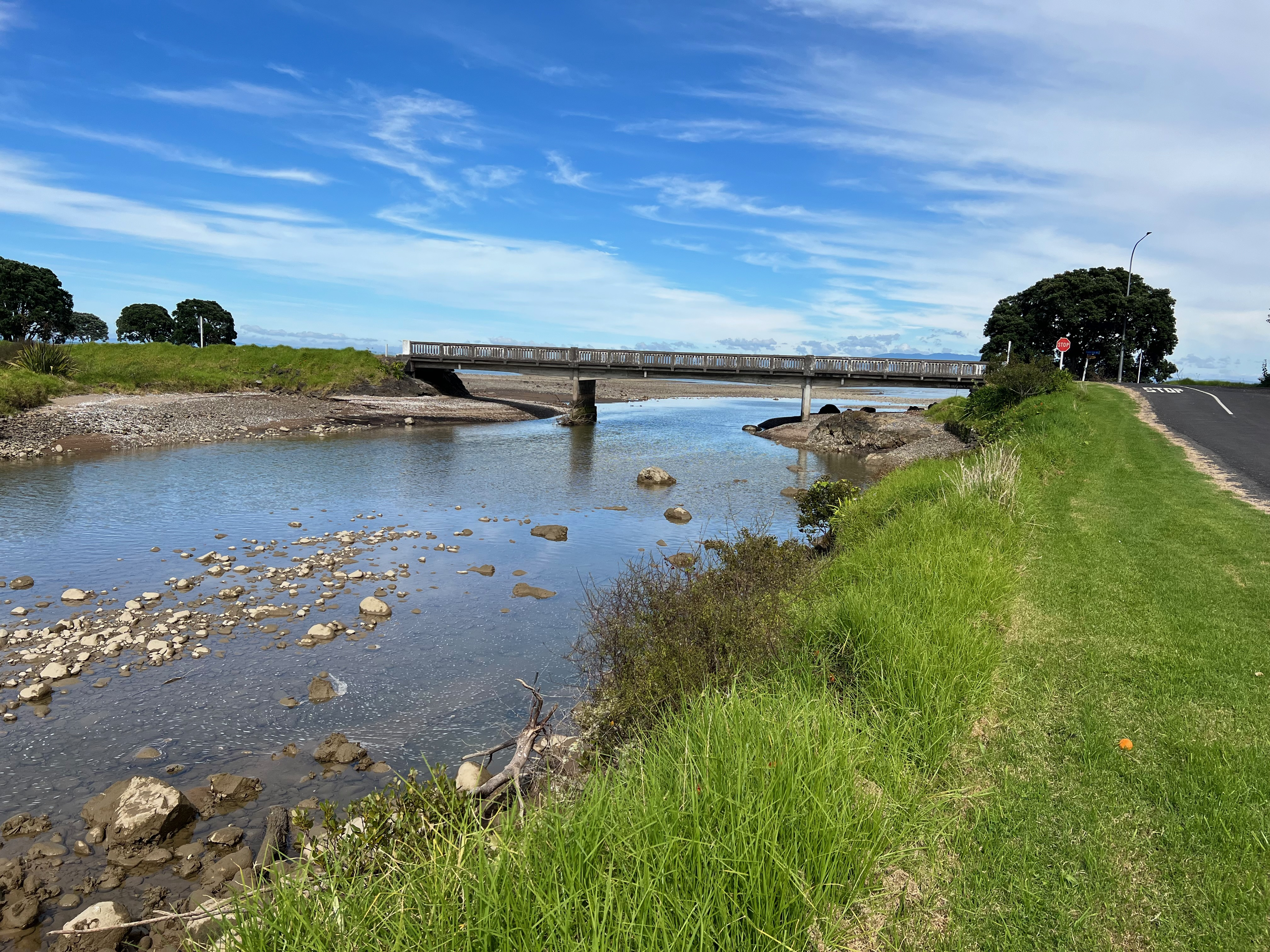
Te Mata River bridge was built about 1945

The Te Mata River is a river of the Coromandel Peninsula in New Zealand's North Island. It flows west to reach the Firth of Thames at the small settlement of Te Mata, 25 kilometres (16 mi) south of Coromandel.

The river was once used to wash large kauri logs down to the sea. The headwaters were logged for kauri around 1890–1900. Thames Sawmilling Company cut rimu and miro in the 1960s. The higher areas around Papakai weren't logged. The native frogs, Leiopelma archeyi and Leiopelma hochstetteri, live near the valley.

Gentle Annie mine produced 4.8 kg of gold between 1887 and 1889. Gentle Annie Stream joins the river about 3 km up from the coast and the find was described as being towards the ridge.

The SH25 bridge was built about 1945.

== See also ==
- List of rivers of New Zealand
