= Tauhoa =

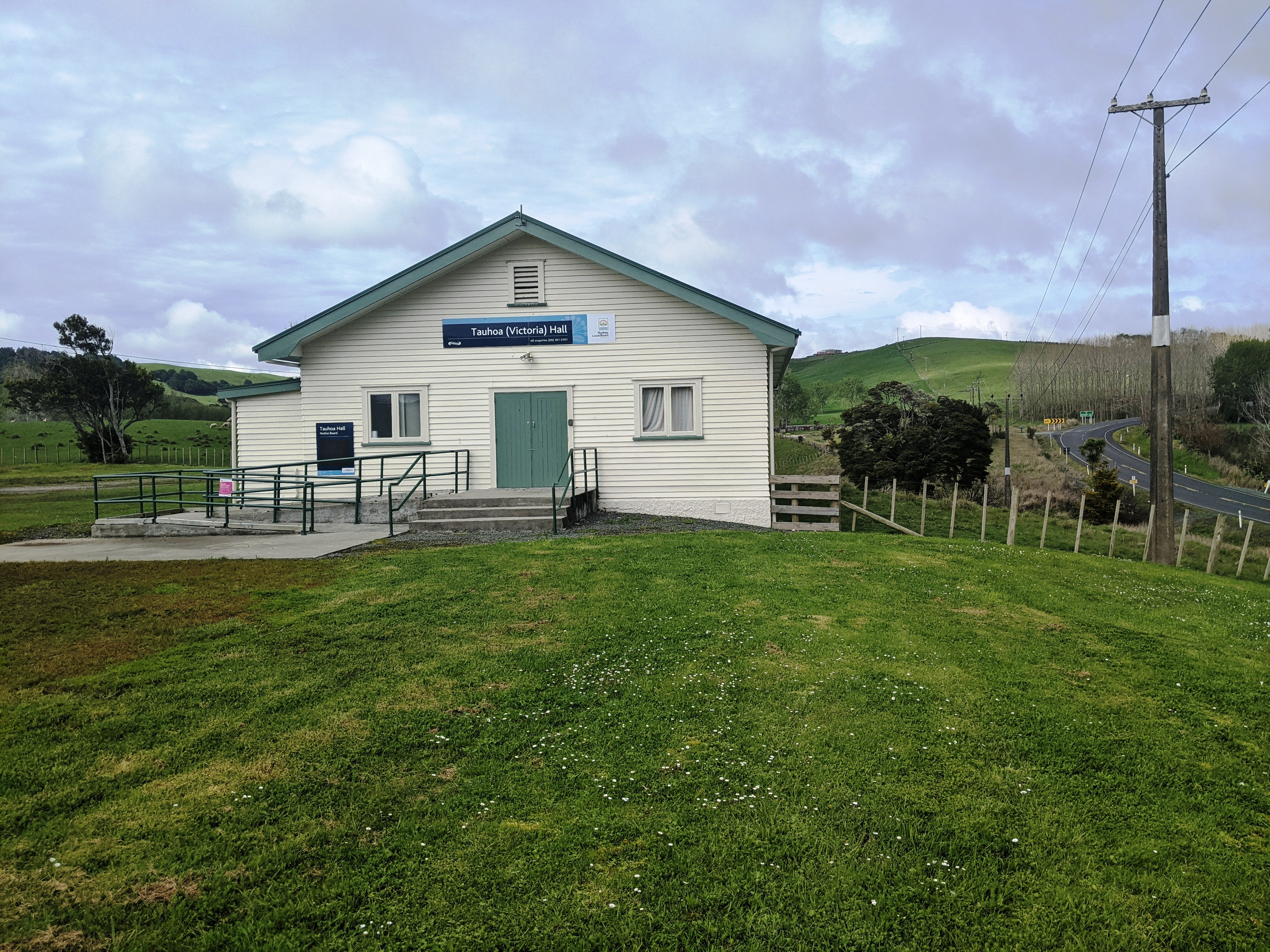
- Tauhoa (Victoria) Hall

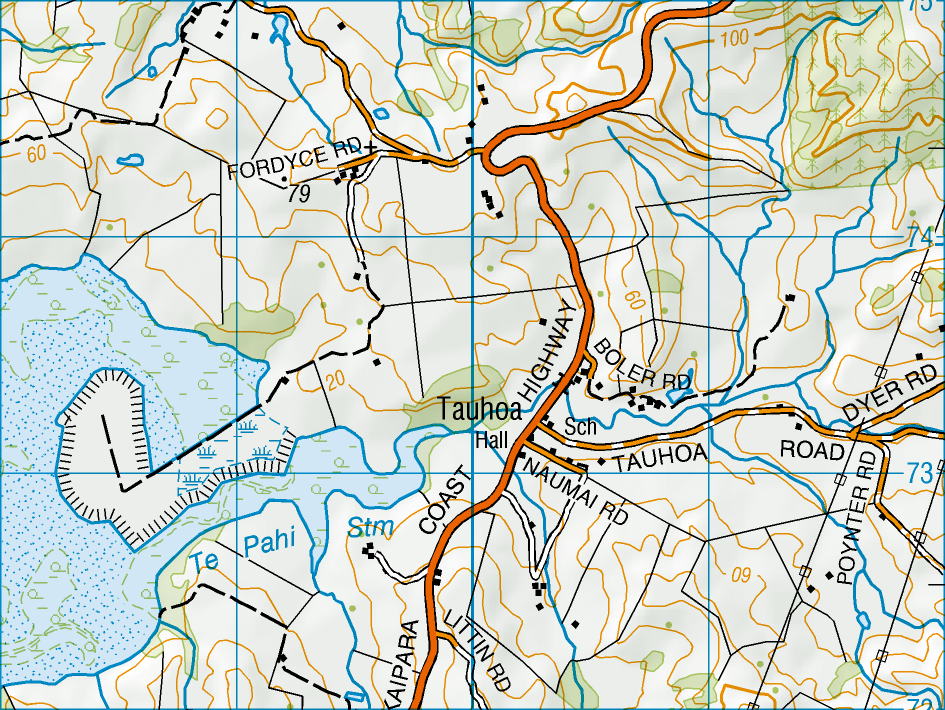
- Coordinates: 36°22′38″S 174°27′8″E
- Country: New Zealand
- Region: Auckland Region
- Local board: Rodney Local Board
- Subdivision: Wellsford subdivision
- Electorates: Kaipara ki Mahurangi; Te Tai Tokerau

Government
  - Territorial Authority: Auckland Council
  - Mayor of Auckland: Wayne Brown
  - Kaipara ki Mahurangi MP: Chris Penk
  - Te Tai Tokerau MP: Mariameno Kapa-Kingi

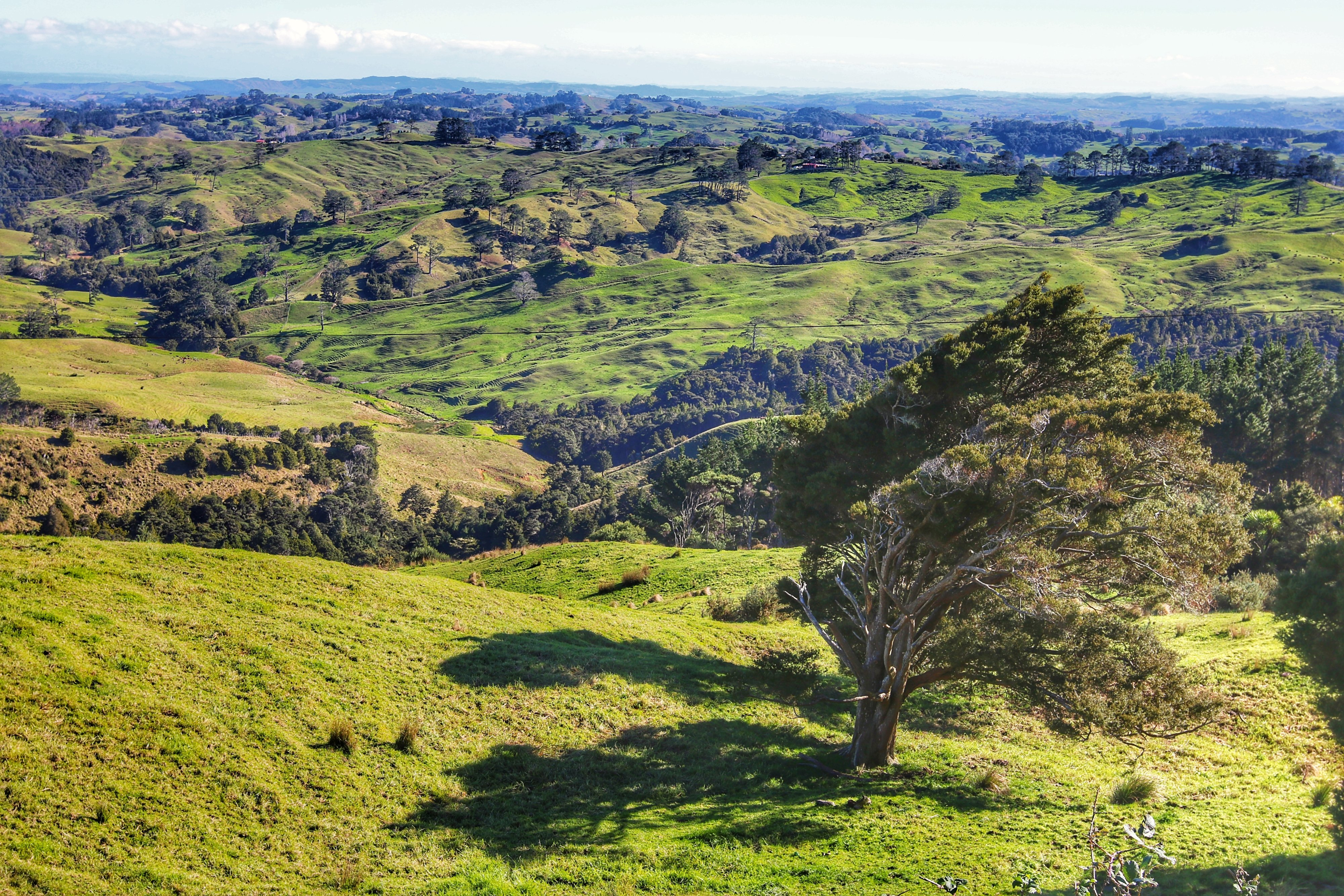
View of farmland in Rodney District, near the township of Tauhoa

Tauhoa is a rural village in the North Island of New Zealand.

State Highway 16 runs through the area, connecting to Wellsford 15 km to the north-east and Glorit 12 km to the south. Te Pahi Stream flows through the area and into the Tauhoa River, which drains into the southern Kaipara Harbour to the west.

== History and culture ==
=== European settlement ===
The Tauhoa block, together with the Hoteo block inland of it, together comprising 41,400 acres (16,800 ha), were purchased from the Māori chief Te Keene and others in March 1867. Land at Tauhoa was first offered for sale to settlers in 1868, but in 1875 some of the land was still being surveyed for future settlement. Some of the land occupied by settlers in the 1870s was abandoned in the 1880s. Gum-digging took place from the late 19th-century to 1910.

A tramway operated during the 1880s to bring kauri logs down to Te Pahi Stream, where sailing ships could take them away. The barque Mary Mildred was stranded and wrecked in the Tauhoa River with a load of kauri. The small steamer S.S. Mary Allen was built at Tauhoa and transported goods between Te Pahi Creek and the northern Wairoa River in the early 1880s.

A road north to Port Albert was described as "a good summer road" in 1880. By 1886, a route south to Kaukapakapa was complete and bridged, but was still impassable in winter. A small portion of the road at Tauhoa was metalled in 1899. In the late 1920s, the road from Tauhoa to the railway station at Hoteo was designated a highway, and metalled. Other roads in the area were mostly metalled by the mid-1930s.

Tauhoa is a productive area for agriculture but historically fortunes were not so grand. Some settlers called the area around Linton Road 'Strugglers Gully'.

== Governance ==
The Tauhoa Road District was formed 26 September 1867, it is not known when it began operation. It was dissolved c.1906–1911.

Tauhoa was part of the Kourawhero/Tauhoa riding as part of Rodney County until 1989 when the county was replaced by the Rodney District Council.

== Demographics ==
Tauhoa is in an SA1 statistical area which covers 43.10 km^{2} (16.64 sq mi). The SA1 area is part of the larger Kaipara Hills statistical area.

Historical population for Tauhoa and surrounds
Year	Pop.	±% p.a.
2006	126	—
2013	123	−0.34%
2018	132	+1.42%
2023	168	+4.94%

The SA1 statistical area had a population of 168 in the 2023 New Zealand census, an increase of 36 people (27.3%) since the 2018 census, and an increase of 45 people (36.6%) since the 2013 census. There were 84 males and 87 females in 42 dwellings. 1.8% of people identified as LGBTIQ+. The median age was 39.9 years (compared with 38.1 years nationally). There were 42 people (25.0%) aged under 15 years, 21 (12.5%) aged 15 to 29, 78 (46.4%) aged 30 to 64, and 30 (17.9%) aged 65 or older.

People could identify as more than one ethnicity. The results were 91.1% European (Pākehā); 33.9% Māori; 1.8% Pasifika; 1.8% Asian; 1.8% Middle Eastern, Latin American and African New Zealanders (MELAA); and 3.6% other, which includes people giving their ethnicity as "New Zealander". English was spoken by 100.0%, Māori language by 3.6%, and other languages by 7.1%. The percentage of people born overseas was 16.1, compared with 28.8% nationally.

Religious affiliations were 23.2% Christian, 3.6% Māori religious beliefs, 1.8% Buddhist, and 1.8% New Age. People who answered that they had no religion were 66.1%, and 7.1% of people did not answer the census question.

Of those at least 15 years old, 21 (16.7%) people had a bachelor's or higher degree, 81 (64.3%) had a post-high school certificate or diploma, and 30 (23.8%) people exclusively held high school qualifications. The median income was $39,900, compared with $41,500 nationally. 12 people (9.5%) earned over $100,000 compared to 12.1% nationally. The employment status of those at least 15 was that 63 (50.0%) people were employed full-time, 24 (19.0%) were part-time, and 3 (2.4%) were unemployed.

=== Kaipara Hills statistical area ===
Kaipara Hills statistical area, which also includes Glorit, covers 282.62 km^{2} (109.12 sq mi) and had an estimated population of 2,370 as of June 2025, with a population density of 8.4 people per km^{2}.

Historical population for Kaipara Hills
Year	Pop.	±% p.a.
2006	1,473	—
2013	1,686	+1.95%
2018	1,965	+3.11%
2023	2,235	+2.61%

Kaipara Hills had a population of 2,235 in the 2023 New Zealand census, an increase of 270 people (13.7%) since the 2018 census, and an increase of 549 people (32.6%) since the 2013 census. There were 1,113 males, 1,104 females and 15 people of other genders in 732 dwellings. 2.6% of people identified as LGBTIQ+. The median age was 39.6 years (compared with 38.1 years nationally). There were 486 people (21.7%) aged under 15 years, 351 (15.7%) aged 15 to 29, 1,146 (51.3%) aged 30 to 64, and 249 (11.1%) aged 65 or older.

People could identify as more than one ethnicity. The results were 87.8% European (Pākehā); 20.7% Māori; 2.4% Pasifika; 2.4% Asian; 0.7% Middle Eastern, Latin American and African New Zealanders (MELAA); and 3.5% other, which includes people giving their ethnicity as "New Zealander". English was spoken by 96.9%, Māori language by 4.0%, and other languages by 8.2%. No language could be spoken by 2.1% (e.g. too young to talk). New Zealand Sign Language was known by 0.3%. The percentage of people born overseas was 19.1, compared with 28.8% nationally.

Religious affiliations were 22.6% Christian, 0.3% Hindu, 0.1% Islam, 3.8% Māori religious beliefs, 0.4% Buddhist, 0.8% New Age, 0.1% Jewish, and 1.5% other religions. People who answered that they had no religion were 62.4%, and 8.2% of people did not answer the census question.

Of those at least 15 years old, 255 (14.6%) people had a bachelor's or higher degree, 1,044 (59.7%) had a post-high school certificate or diploma, and 378 (21.6%) people exclusively held high school qualifications. The median income was $40,700, compared with $41,500 nationally. 228 people (13.0%) earned over $100,000 compared to 12.1% nationally. The employment status of those at least 15 was that 954 (54.5%) people were employed full-time, 249 (14.2%) were part-time, and 48 (2.7%) were unemployed.

== Education ==
Tauhoa School is a coeducational full primary (years 1-8) school with a roll of 61 students as of July 2026.

The school opened in 1879.
