= Whakapara River =

Coordinates: 35°33′S 174°14′E

Location
- Country: New Zealand

Physical characteristics
- Mouth
  - location: Wairua River
- Length: 18 km (11 mi)

The Whakapara River is a river of the Northland Region of New Zealand's North Island. One of the headwaters of the Wairua River, it flows generally east from its sources close to the North Auckland Peninsula's east coast, and reaches the Wairua 5 km (3.1 mi) west of Otonga.

== See also ==
- List of rivers of New Zealand
