= Kaipara Harbour =

Harbour estuary in New Zealand

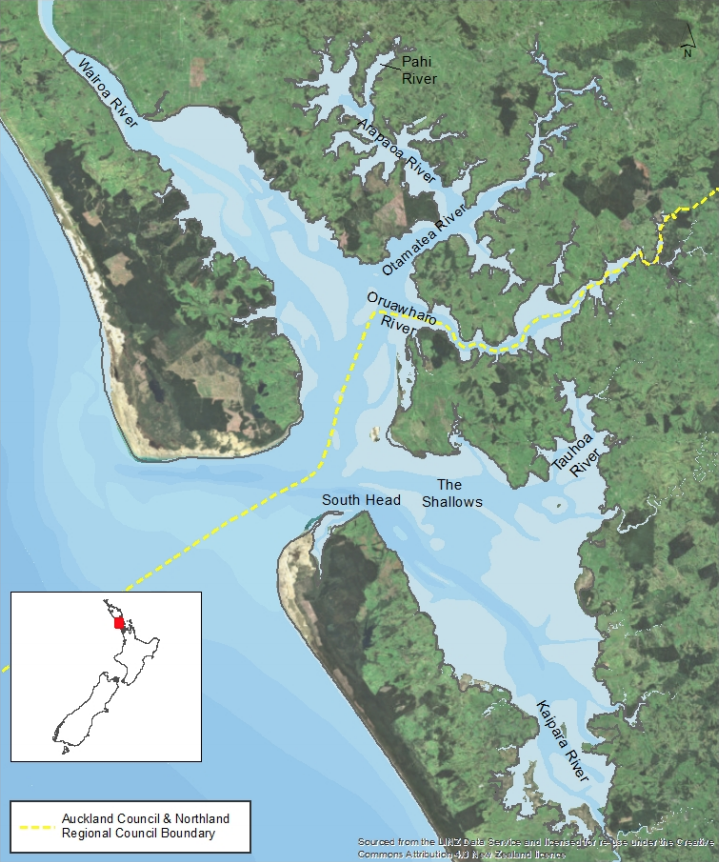
- Kaipara Harbour opens onto the Tasman Sea
- Interactive map of Kaipara Harbour
- Location: Northland and Auckland Regions, New Zealand
- Coordinates: 36°25′S 174°13′E
- River sources: Arapārera River, Hikurangi River, Hōteo River, Kaihu River, Kaipara River, Kaiwaka River, Kaukapakapa River, Kumeū River, Makarau River, Mangakahia River, Manganui River, Mangawai River, Omaru River, Opatu River, Oruawharo River, Otamatea River, Topuni River, Wairoa River, Wairua River, Whakapara River
- Ocean/sea sources: Tasman Sea
- Basin countries: New Zealand
- Islands: Manukapua Island, Titipu Island, Moturemu Island, Ōpāhekeheke Island, Puharakeke Island, Motukuru Island, Waikauri Island
- Sections/sub-basins: Arapaoa River, Tauhoa River, Whakaki River
- Settlements: Glorit, Helensville, Kaukapakapa, Matakohe, Maungaturoto, Pahi, Parakai, Port Albert, Pouto, Ruawai, Shelly Beach, Tapora, Tauhoa, Tinopai, Waioneke

Kaipara Harbour is a large enclosed harbour estuary complex on the north-western side of the North Island of New Zealand. The northern part of the harbour is administered by Kaipara District Council and the southern part by Auckland Council. The local Māori iwi is Ngāti Whātua.

By area, the Kaipara Harbour is one of the largest harbours in the world. It covers 947 square kilometres (366 sq mi) at high tide, with 409 square kilometres (158 sq mi) exposed as mudflats and sandflats at low tide.

According to Māori tradition, the name Kaipara had its origins in the 15th century when the Arawa chief Kahumatamomoe travelled to the Kaipara to visit his nephew at Pouto. At a feast, he was so impressed with the cooked root of the para fern, that he gave the name Kai-para to the district. Kaipara comes from the Māori kai meaning "food", and para meaning "king fern".

== Geography ==
The harbour extends for some 60 kilometres (37 mi) from north to south. Several large arms extend into the interior of the Northland Peninsula in the north-east of the harbour, one of them ending near the town of Maungaturoto, only ten kilometres (6.2 miles) from the east coast. The harbour has extensive catchments feeding five rivers and over a hundred streams, and includes large estuaries formed by the Wairoa, Otamatea, Oruawharo, Tauhoa (Channel) and Kaipara. A number of small islands off the shoreline are connected to the mainland by mudflats at low tide.

The Kaipara Harbour is broad and mostly shallow, as it is formed from a system of drowned river valleys. The harbour shoreline is convoluted by the entry of many rivers and streams, and is about 800 kilometres (500 mi) long, being the drainage catchment for about 640,000 hectares (2,500 sq mi) of land.

The harbour mouth is a channel to the Tasman Sea. It narrows to a width of 6 kilometres (3.7 mi), and is over 50 metres (160 ft) deep in parts. On average, Kaipara tides rise and fall 2.10 metres (6.9 ft). Spring tidal flows reach 9 km/h (5 knots) in the entrance channel and move 1,990 million cubic metres per tidal movement or 7,960 million cubic metres daily.

The harbour entrance is hazardous for watercraft. Big waves from the Tasman Sea break over large sandbanks about five metres below the surface, two to five kilometres from the shore. The sand in these sandbanks comes mainly from the Waikato River. Sand discharged from this river is transported northward by the prevailing coastal currents. Some of this sand is carried into the Kaipara harbour entrance, but mostly cycles out again and then continues moving northwards along the west coast. The southern sandbanks at the entrance are constantly accumulating and releasing this sand.

These treacherous sandbanks shift and change position, and are known locally as "the graveyard". The graveyard is responsible for more shipwrecks than any other place in New Zealand, and has claimed at least 43 vessels – some say as many as 110. For this reason, a lighthouse was built in 1884 at the end of the Pouto Peninsula, on the northern side of the entrance. It was automated in 1947 and closed in the mid-1950s. The structure still exists and was renovated in 1982–84. The remains of wrecks still become visible under certain tidal and sand conditions. The Kaipara is rarely used today for shipping, and no large settlements lie close to its shores, although many small communities lie along its coastline.

== Geology ==
The Kaipara Harbour is a drowned river valley system, which first formed 2–3 million years ago as an open bay, becoming a sheltered harbour as elongated sand dune barriers formed at the harbour's mouth. Over the last two million years, the harbour has cycled between periods of being a forested river valley and a flooded harbour, depending on changes in the global sea level. The present harbour formed approximately 8,000 years ago, after the Last Glacial Maximum.

== Human use ==
=== Māori mythology and history ===
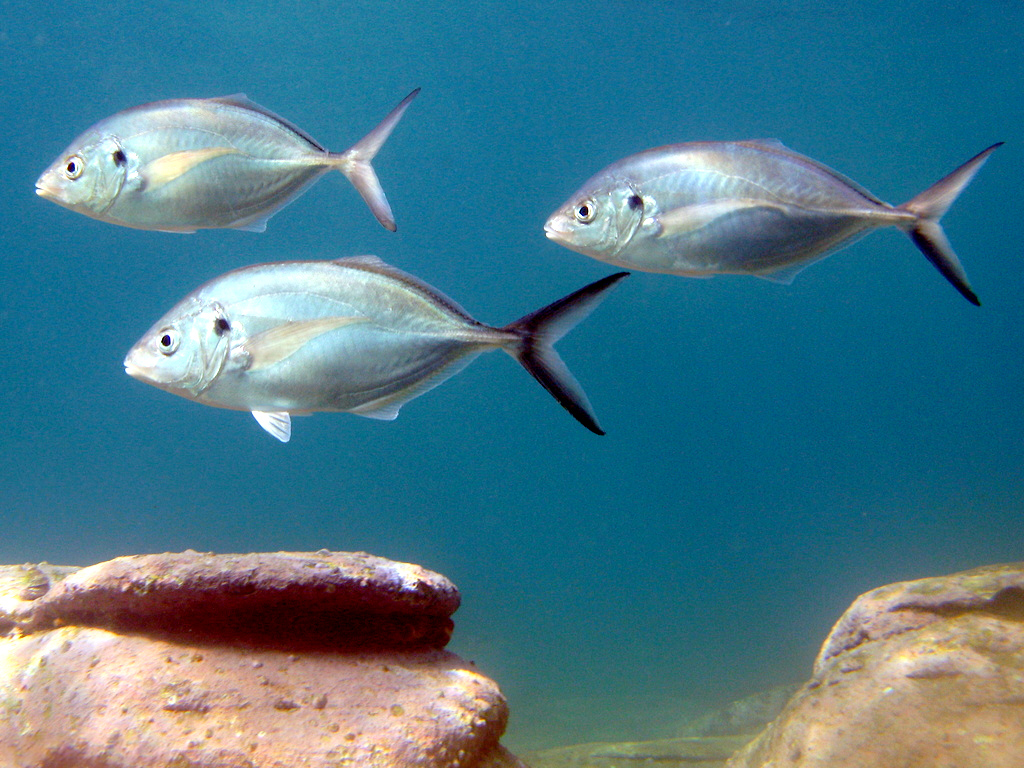
Juvenile white trevally (araara)

In Māori mythology, the ocean-going canoe Māhuhu voyaged from Hawaiki to New Zealand, commanded by the chief Rongomai. It overturned on the northern side of the entrance and Rongomai drowned. His body was eaten by araara (white trevally), and his descendants to this day will not eat that fish.

Māori settlements and marae have been scattered around the harbour margins for hundreds of years. The waterways of the Kaipara provided, and still provide, Māori with resources and a ready means of moving between marae.

Today most marae are associated with the Ngāti Whātua sub-tribes, Te Taoū and Te Uri-o-Hau. Both these sub-tribes descend from the chief Haumoewhārangi, who settled at Poutō on the northern side of the Kaipara entrance. He was killed in an argument about kūmara (sweet potatoes). His widow Waihekeao formed a partnership with a Tainui warrior chief, Kāwharu. Kāwharu led several destructive campaigns around Kaipara. Eventually the descendants of Waihekeao and Haumoewhārangi came to control the Kaipara Harbour. Te Uri-o-Hau was founded by Hakiputatōmuri, and controlled the northern part of Kaipara Harbour. Te Taoū was founded by Mawake, and controlled the south.

=== European history ===
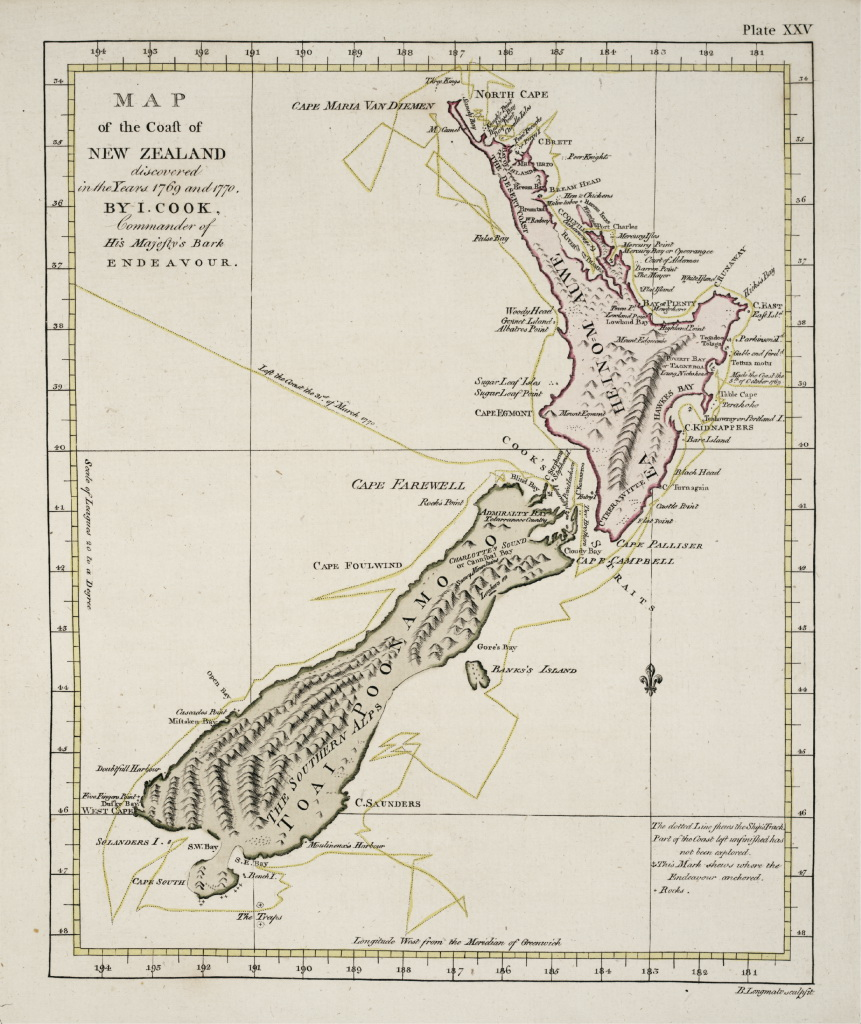
Chart of New Zealand, explored in 1769 and 1770 by Lieut. James Cook, commander of the barque Endeavour. Shows the Kaipara Harbour as "False Bay".

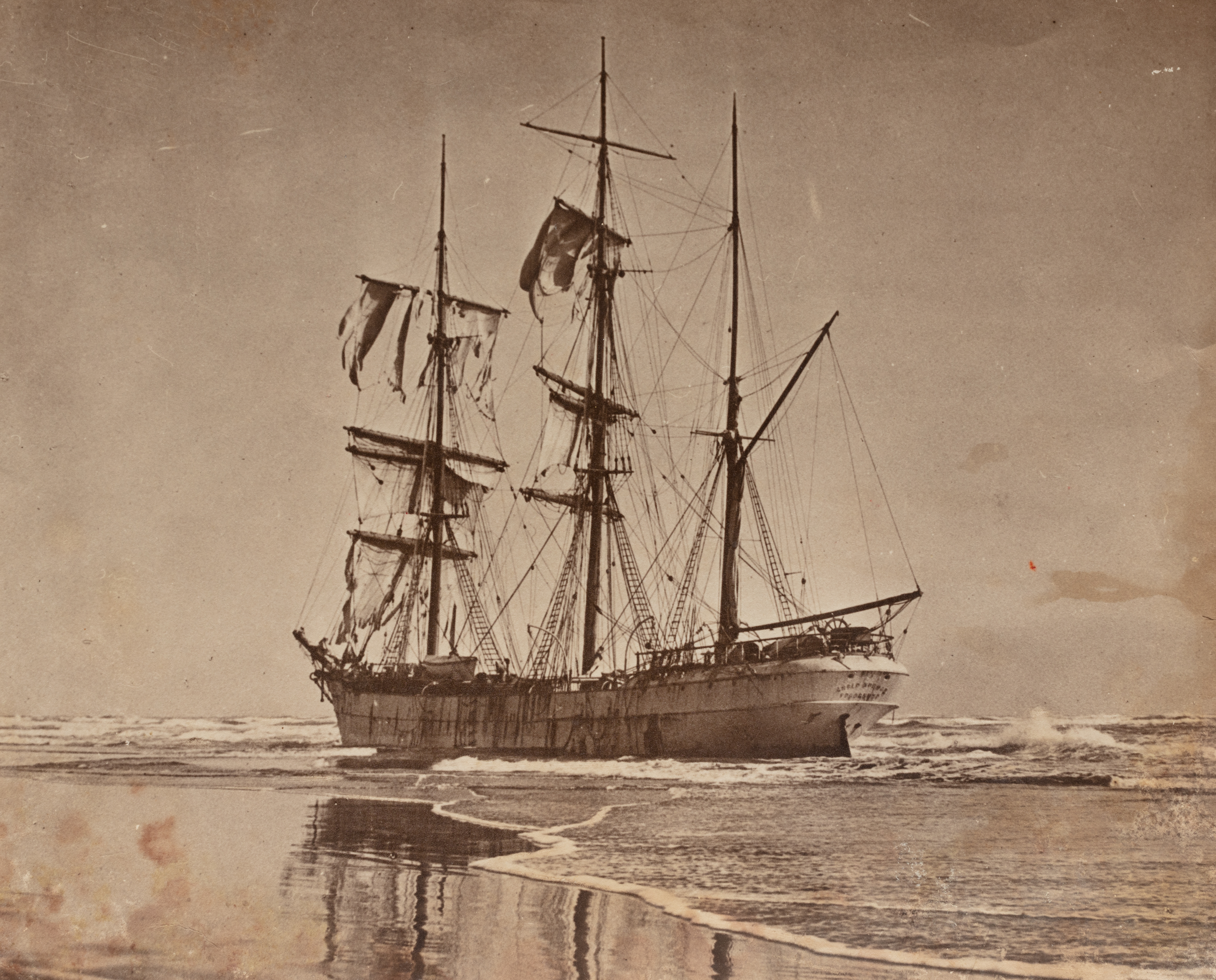
The three-masted barque Anglo Norman went aground on Pouto Peninsula near the harbour entrance in 1914

James Cook sighted and recorded the harbour on his first voyage, in 1770. He named it "False Bay", noting in his journal that it had "the appearance of a Bay or inlet, but I believe it is only low land".

In 1839, European settlers began arriving in the Kaipara to fell and mill kauri trees and build boats for local requirements. Despite the perilous bar at the harbour entrance, the Kaipara became a busy port from the 1860s, shipping thousands of tonnes of kauri timber and gum. The first sailing ship wrecked at the entrance to the harbour was the 550-ton barque Aurora in April 1840. The brigantine Sophia Pate was wrecked at South Head in August 1841 with the loss of all 21 on board. The most recent wreck was the yacht Aosky in 1994.

The town of Dargaville was established 30 kilometres up the Wairoa, the main river feeding the Kaipara from the north. The stretch of water to Dargaville is broad and straight and provided an easy route into the kauri forests in the interior. Dargaville flourished and immigrants from Britain and Croatia were attracted to the area. Ships up to 3,000 tons carried timber and logs out along the Wairoa to defy the bar at the harbour entrance before continuing, usually to another New Zealand port or across the Tasman to Australia.

The Kaipara River is the principal river feeding Kaipara Harbour from the south. From 1863 Helensville established itself as a timber port on this river, and provided shipping services about the Kaipara. When the timber ran out, Helensville developed sheep and dairy farms, and more recently nut plantations, vineyards and deer farms.

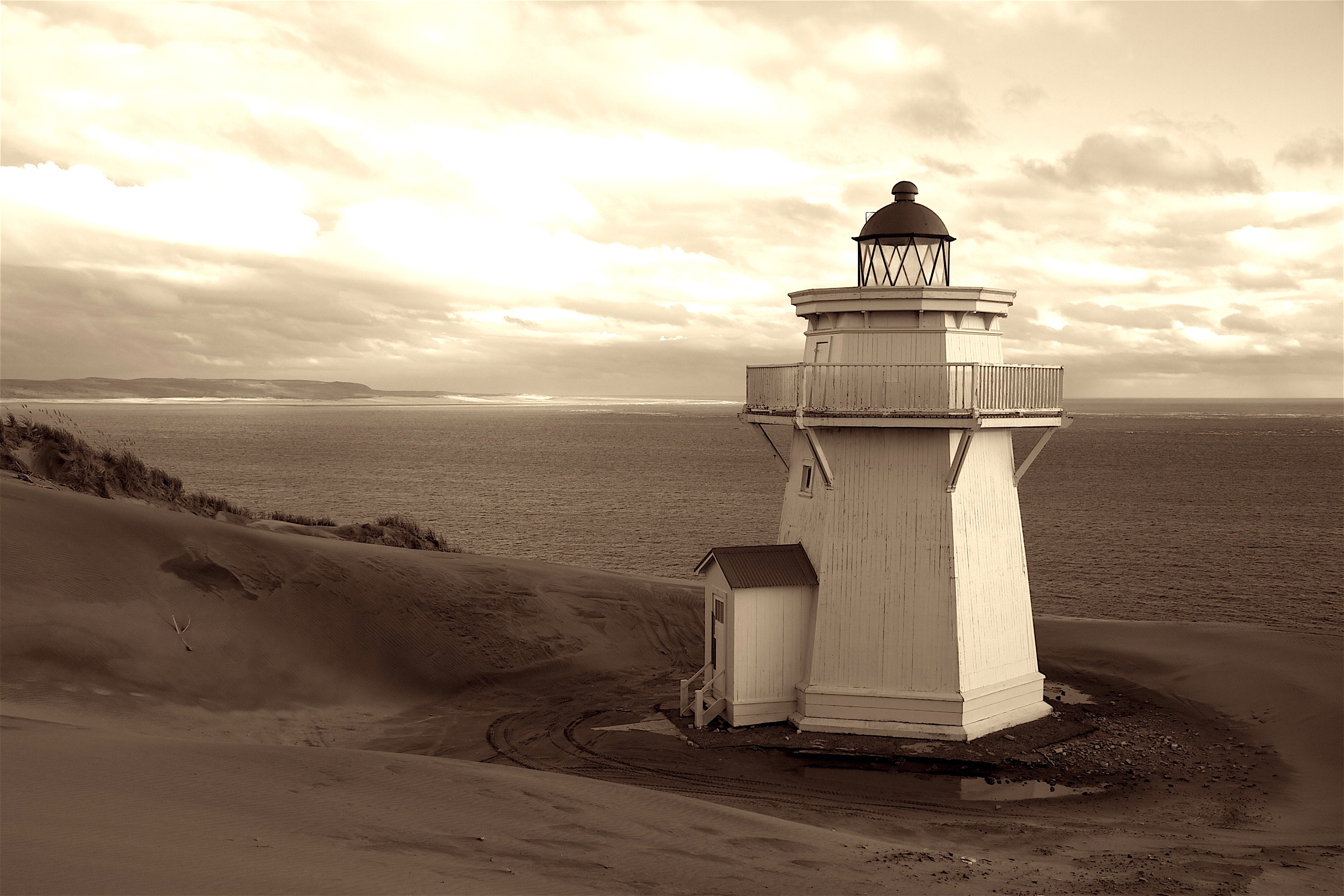
Kaipara lighthouse, 2012

Further south, Riverhead was an important trading link with the Kaipara and Helensville, and a centre for gum digging. Also set by a river, it milled timber and flour, and made paper. Later it turned to tobacco. From 1929 to 1933, the Riverhead State Forest was developed from 5,000 hectares (19 sq mi) of exhausted gum land.

As the kauri ran out, the Kaipara became a backwater. After 1920 the gum and timber industries dwindled, and farming, mainly dairying, took over. In particular, there is dairying on the rich Ruāwai flats. These flats are below sea level, and are protected by a stopbank and a drainage system. Coastal sawmill settlements at Tinopai, Arapaoa, Batley, Matakohe, Oneriri, Ōruawharo, Pahi, Paparoa, Tanoa and Whakapirau have become quiet backwaters. Pahi has become a launch point for houseboats and fishing. Matakohe has a museum which commemorates the kauri industry and the early Pākehā settlers.

Today, Dargaville is the principal centre in the Kaipara area. Its population plateaued in the 1960s. It is the country's main kūmara (sweet potato) producer.

=== Fisheries ===
Much of the coastal fishing industry in New Zealand depends on mangrove forests. About 80% of fish caught commercially are linked to food chains dependent on the mangroves, and at least 30 species of fish use mangrove wetlands at some stage of their life cycle.

The marine and estuarine areas in the Kaipara Harbour breed snapper, mullet, flounder, sole, kahawai, white trevally, gurnard, yellow‑eyed mullet and skates, rays and sharks. The Kaipara is the largest estuarine harbour on the west coast of New Zealand and provides significant areas of suitable breeding grounds and habitats for juvenile fish. It has fewer problems with water quality than the Manukau, and is the single most significant wetland for west coast fisheries.

In 2009, NIWA scientists discovered that 98 percent of snapper on the west coast of the North Island were originally juveniles from nurseries in the Kaipara. Snapper is New Zealand's largest recreational fishery, and is also a commercial fishery with an annual export value of $32 million. The findings show how fragile some fish stocks can be, and highlights the importance of protecting natural habitats, like the Kaipara.

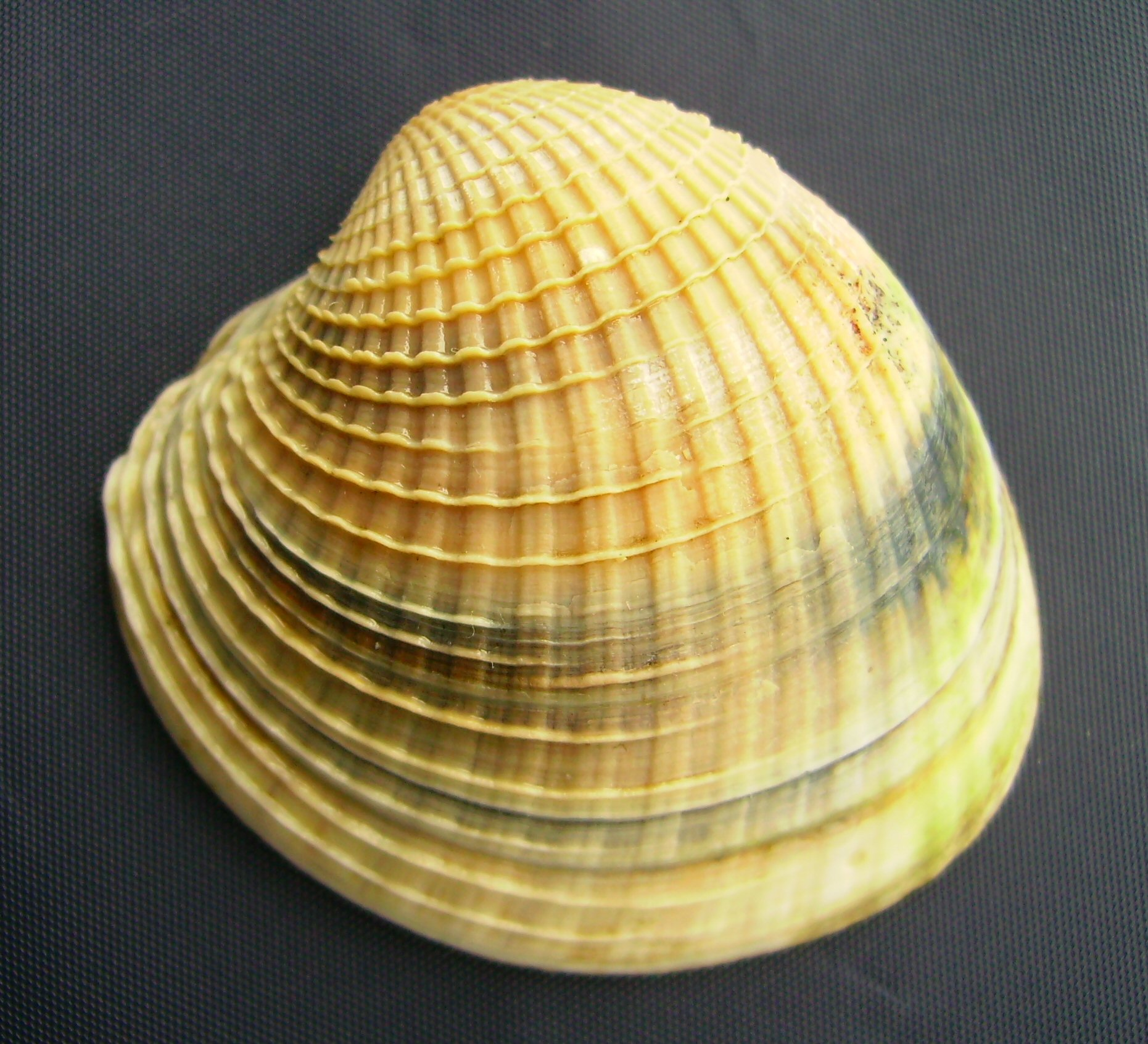
New Zealand cockle

Native rock oysters are plentiful on the rocky shores, and the introduced Pacific oysters flourish lower in the intertidal zone. There are cockles and tuatua on the lower tidal flats, mussels from low tide on the rocks to subtidal beds closer to the mouth of the harbour, and scallops in the tidal channels.

The scallop population has periodic incidences of high mortality, the causes of which have not been identified. Concerns in recent years about the size and availability of scallops have resulted in temporary closures of the scallop fisheries.

Early versions of oyster farming occurred between the early 1900s and 1950s. Thousands of tons of rocks were placed along the shorelines to act as an additional substrate on which the natural rock oyster could grow. In 2002, the Crown settled the historical claims of Te Uri o Hau, a hapū of the northern Kaipara Harbour. As part of the settlement, access to and the rights of the hapū to gather oysters within the existing "Maori Oyster Areas" were recognised. In 2008, resource consent was given to Biomarine to establish New Zealand's largest oyster farm in the Kaipara. The farm is projected to produce about NZ$30 million in annual exports and 100 new jobs.

In recent years, there has been a perception amongst locals that commercial fishers have damaged fisheries in the Kaipara. Locals have been frustrated in their attempts to gain government support. The veteran filmmaker Barry Barclay has examined this in his 2005 documentary, The Kaipara affair.

=== Sand mining ===
Currently (2007) about 219,000 cubic metres of sand is mined each year from the entrance and tidal deltas of the Kaipara. This sand contributes over half the sand requirements for Auckland. The sand is used in the production of concrete and asphalt, and also in drainage systems and beach nourishment. A suction pump is usually used to extract the sand from the seabed. It is pumped into a barge as a sand and water slurry. As the barge loads, shells and other objects are screened out and the sea water drained back to the sea. The availability of sea sand within the Auckland region means the road costs of transporting sand from further parts of the country are avoided. Concerns about possible negative consequences of this sand mining have also been raised.

=== Tidal power ===
External images
- Kaipara Harbour main channel
- Proposed cable and turbines

In 2008, Crest Energy, a power company, received resource consent to install about 200 underwater tidal turbines in the Kaipara Harbour, which would use the substantial tidal flows moving in and out every day near the harbour mouth to produce electricity for approximately 250,000 homes.

Crest planned to place the turbines at least 30 metres deep along a ten kilometre stretch of the main channel. Historical charts show this stretch of the channel has changed little over 150 years. The output of the turbines will cycle twice daily with the predictable rise and fall of the tide. Each turbine will have a maximum output of 1.2 MW, and is expected to generate 0.75 MW averaged over time.

The peak level of generation for the combined turbines is about 200 MW. This exceeds the projected peak electricity needs of Northland. It would have environmental benefits in offsetting annual carbon emissions from a thermal-based, gas turbine generator of 575,000 tonnes of carbon. The project was costed at about $600 million and to be economic would have to be scaled up rapidly to near full capacity.

However, while the Department of Conservation had approved the project, and had made substantial environmental monitoring conditions part of the consent, the project also had objectors on the grounds of claimed influences on the local ecosystems and charter fishing (see the section above on fisheries). Appeals before the Environment Court are still likely. The project was put on hold by Crest Energy in late 2013; its director Anthony cited several issues that prevented the project from proceeding. He also sold the majority of his shareholdings to Todd Energy Ltd the same year.

== Ecology and environment ==
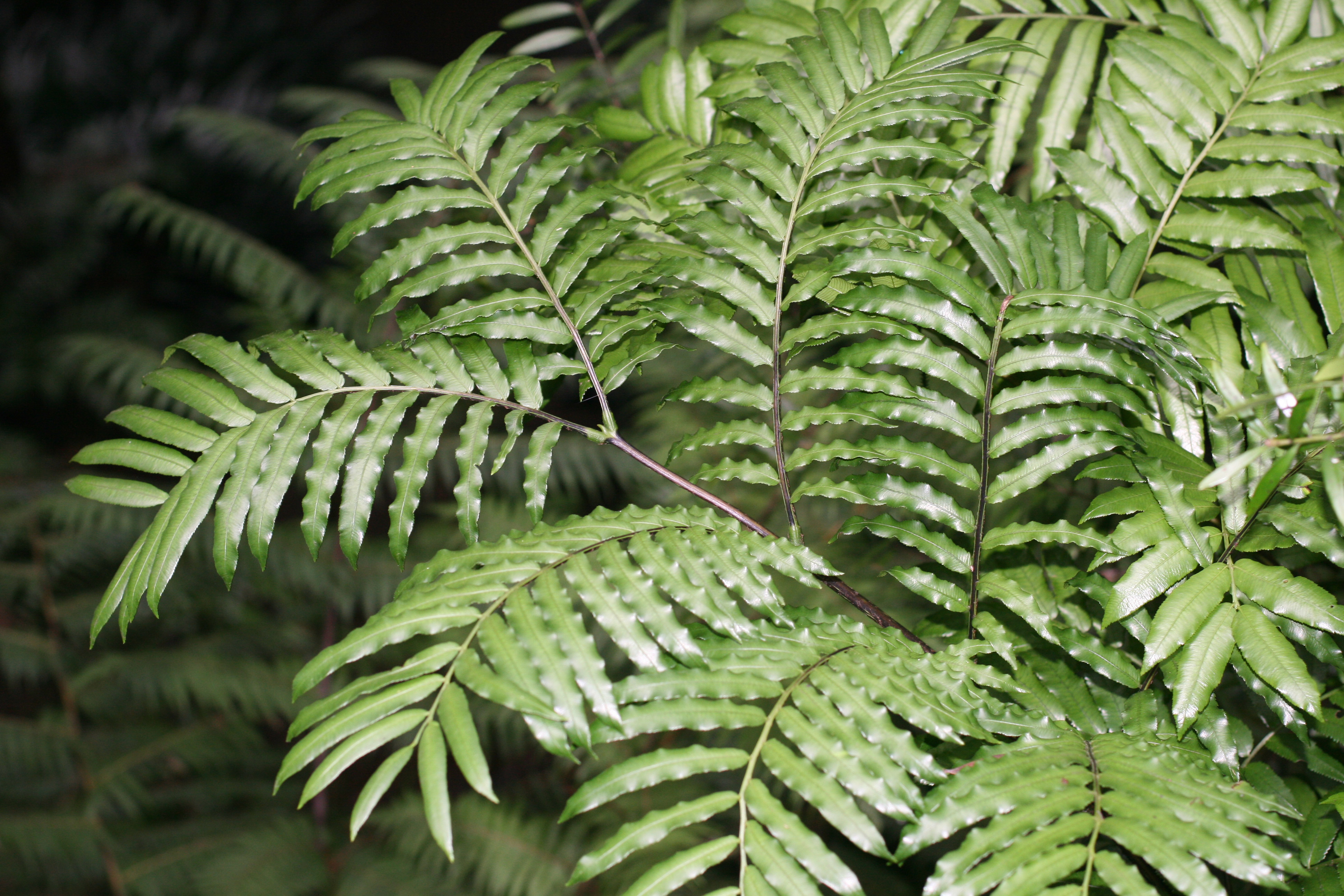
The Kaipara is named after the eating quality (kai) of the king fern (para)

The Kaipara Harbour is a productive marine ecosystem, with diverse habitats and ecotones. There are tidal reaches, intertidal mudflats and sandflats, freshwater swamps, maritime rushes, reed beds and coastal scrublands. The area includes 125 square kilometres of mangrove forest, with subtidal fringes of seagrass.

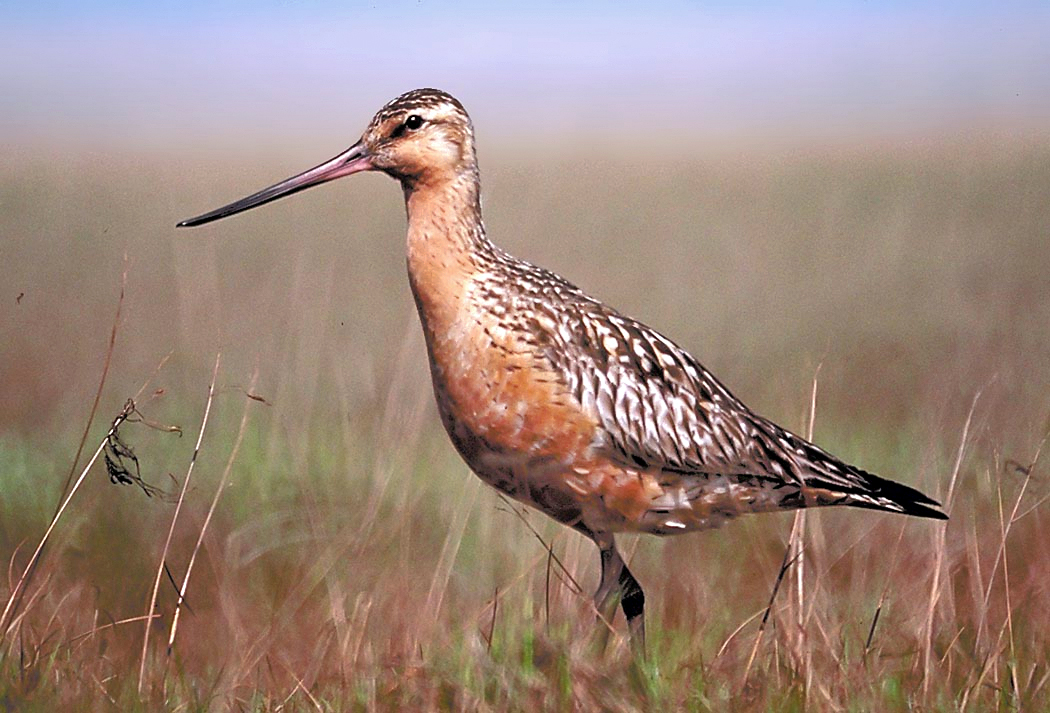
Bar-tailed godwit

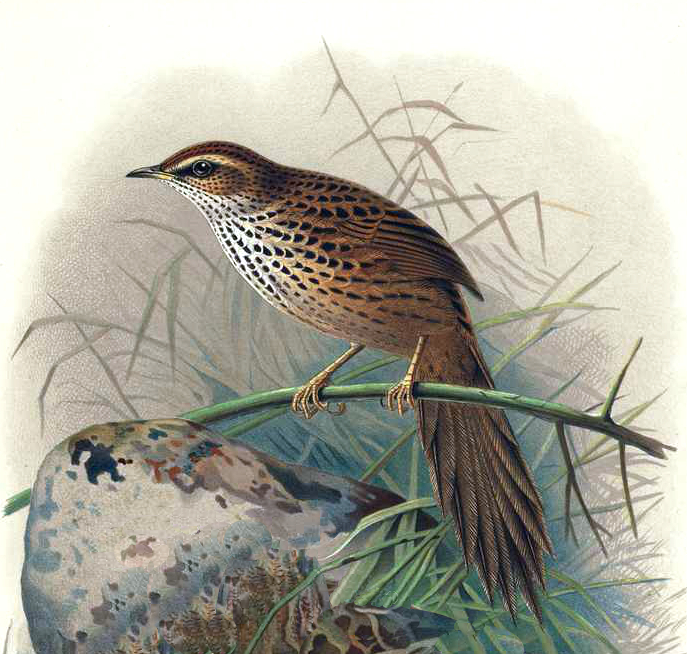
Fern bird

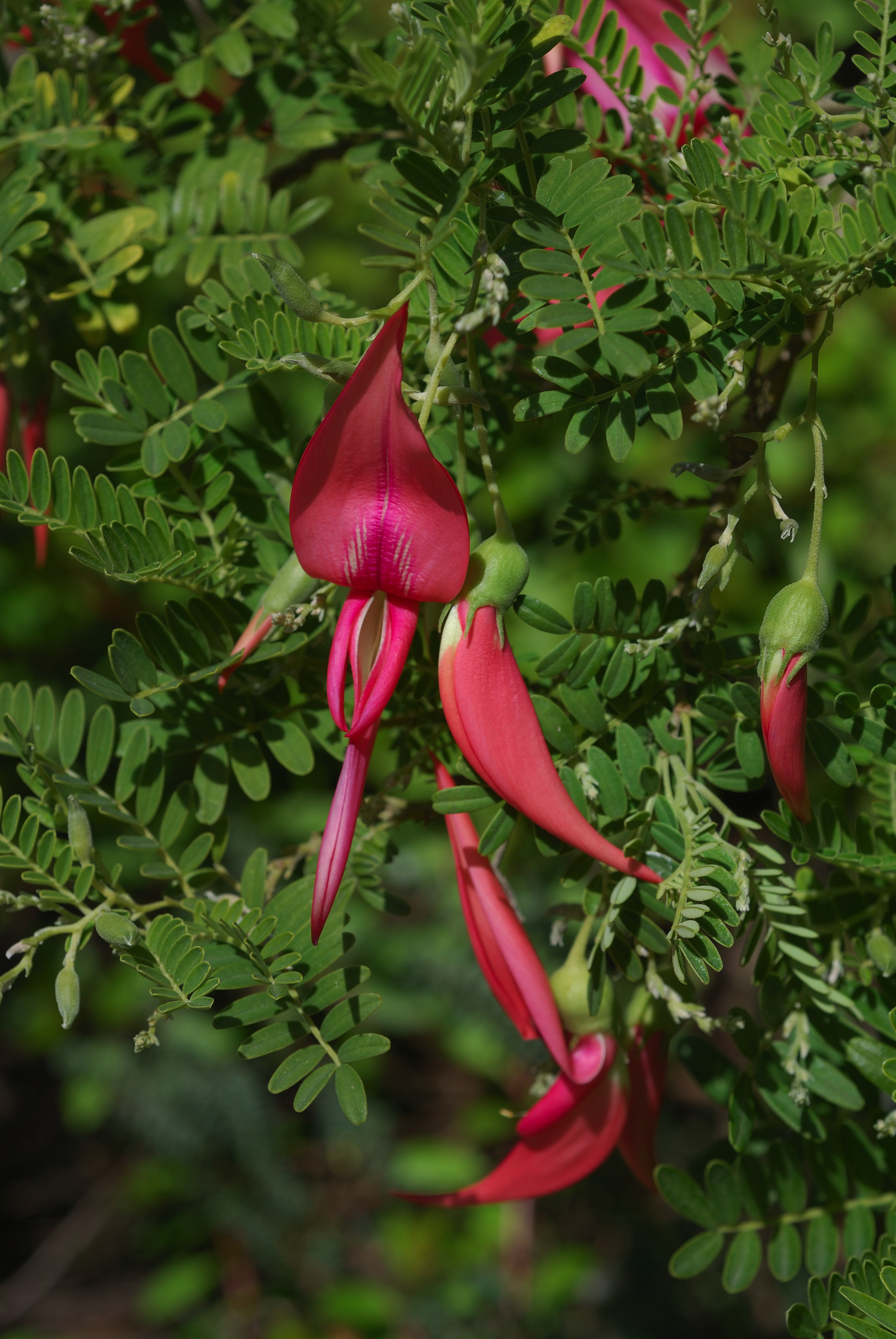
Kaka beak leaves and flowers

The Kaipara is a migratory bird habitat of international significance. Forty-two coastal species are known, and up to 50,000 birds are common. Rare species use the harbour for feeding during summer before returning to the Northern Hemisphere to breed, such as the bar-tailed godwit, lesser knot, and turnstone. Threatened or endangered native species such as the North Island fernbird, fairy tern, crake, Australasian bittern, banded rail, grey‑faced petrels, banded and NZ dotterels, South Island pied oystercatcher, pied stilt, and wrybill are also present. Significant local populations of black swan, pūkeko, and grey duck also breed in the area.

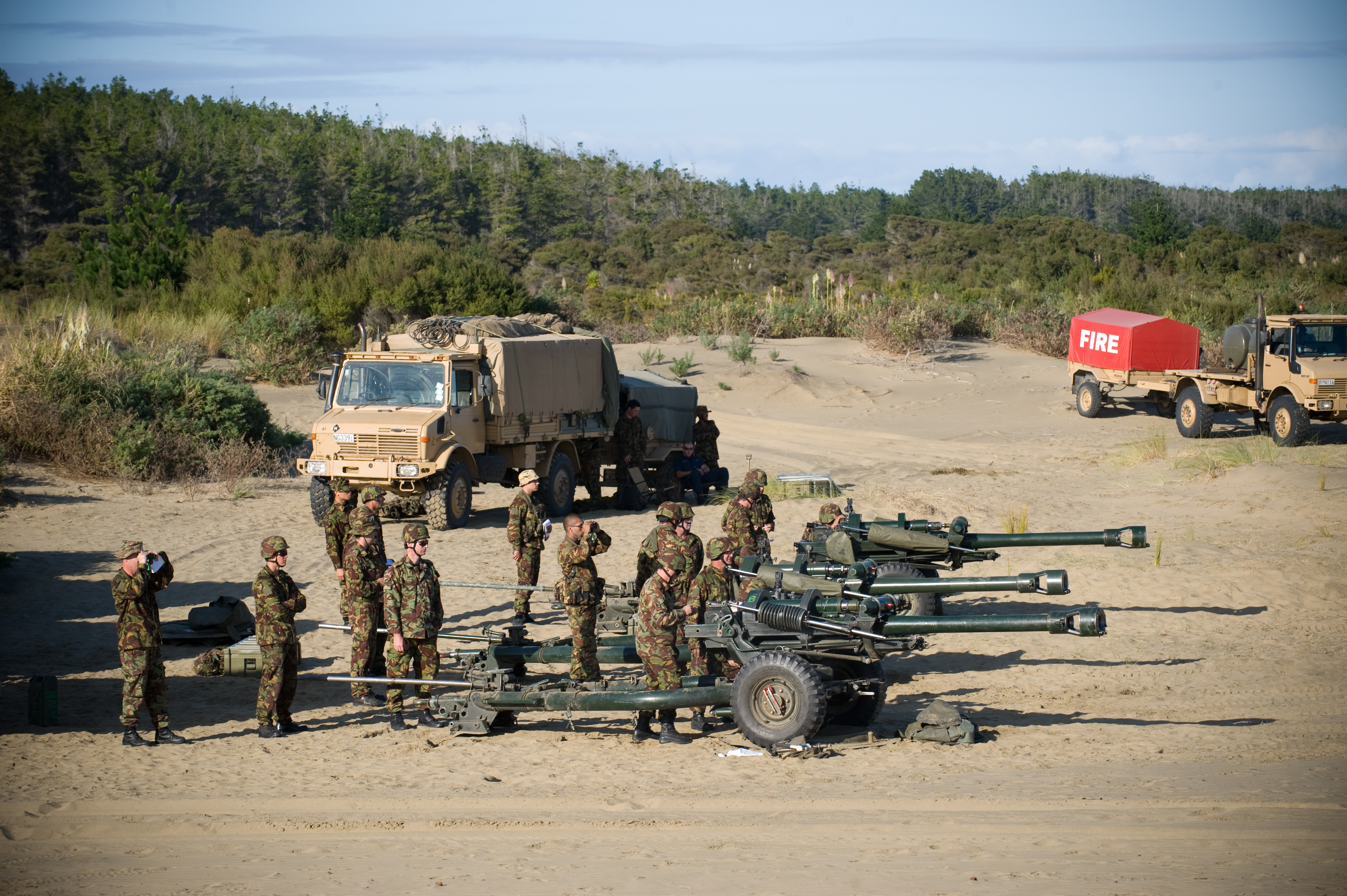
Artillery training with 105mm field guns at the Kaipara weapons range

Land habitats adjacent to the harbour support some rare botanical species, including native orchids, the king fern, and the endangered kaka beak.

In particular, Papakanui Spit on the south head of the harbour entrance, a mobile sandspit, is important as a breeding and roosting area for the New Zealand dotterel and the fairy tern. It also has areas of pingao. The spit was an important habitat for the Caspian tern. The birds have moved to other parts of Kaipara Harbour, possibly due to human disturbance. An air weapons range used by the New Zealand Defence Force is a short distance south of the spit.

In 2011, the environmental state of the harbour was said to be "nearing crisis" and "in significant decline". Shrinking fish and shellfish stocks, more sedimentation, declining water quality, and competition for resource use and development were noted as the main issues, with "ninety-nine per cent of the rivers in the catchment ... polluted".

Biodiversity in the Kaipara has declined. The timber industry removed most of the native forest. Much of the kauri and kahikatea forest, scrub and riparian vegetation has been replaced with farms and urban areas. Mangrove forests and wetlands have been reclaimed. Soil erosion on land and sedimentation in the harbour have increased. Shellfish abundance has declined, especially toheroa, scallops, tuatua, cockles and pipi. Finfish like mullet, snapper, kanae and school shark have diminished.

Habitat fragmentation has occurred. Natural vegetation in the Kaipara catchments have been reduced to islands of wetlands and forest in human-made landscapes – separated by urban areas, roads, exotic forests and pastures. More information is needed on biodiversity in the Kaipara Harbour and habitats in associated coastal areas. A recent pilot survey found that habitats in the estuaries are still extensive, but ninety percent of land cover is no longer indigenous wetland or vegetation. Even if the key existing areas were to be protected, further buffers and corridors that give better connection between the natural areas would be needed to encourage the recovery of biodiversity.

== Management ==
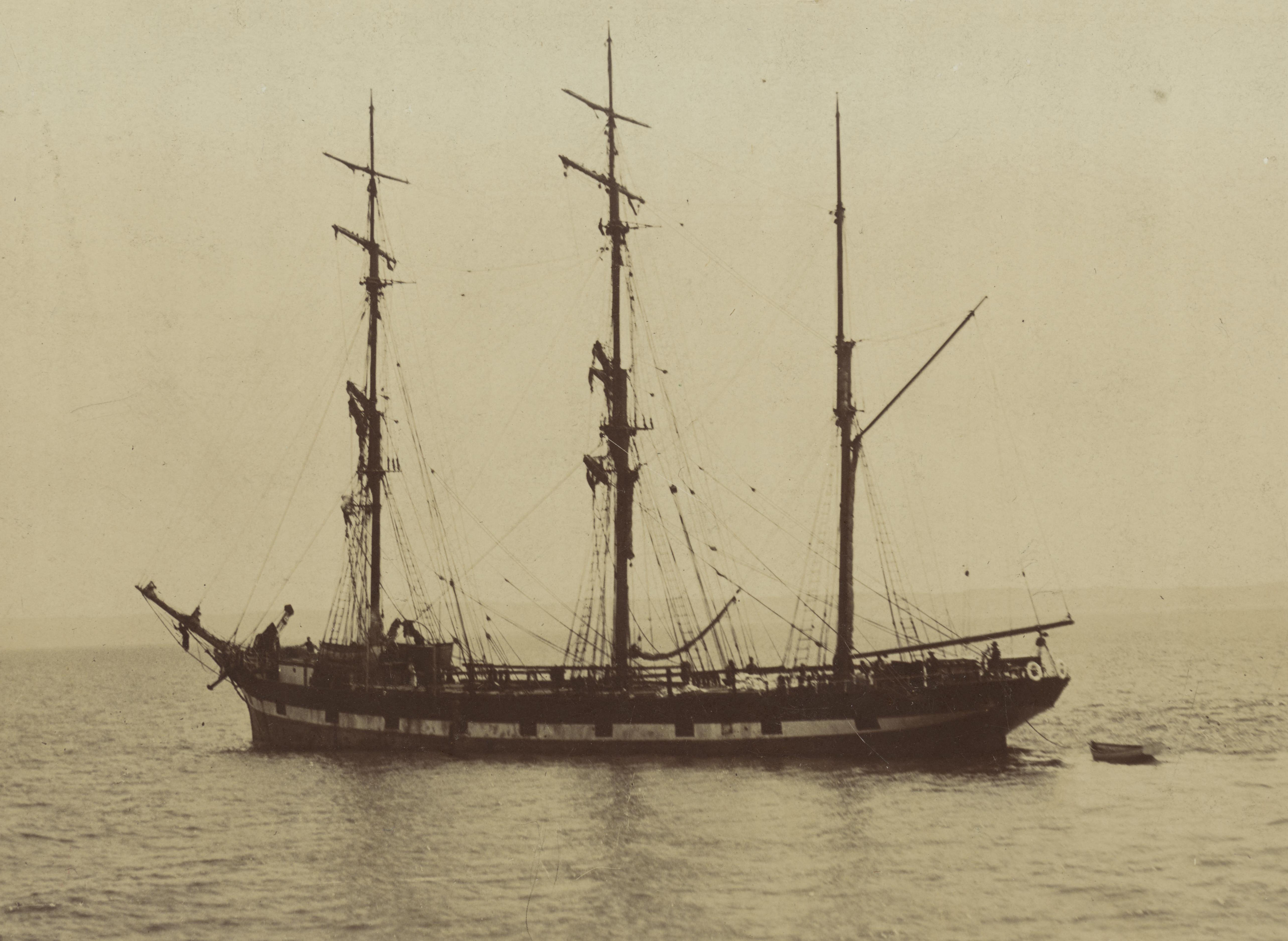
Timber-laden vessel waiting at Kaipara Heads for a favourable breeze. Pre-1909.

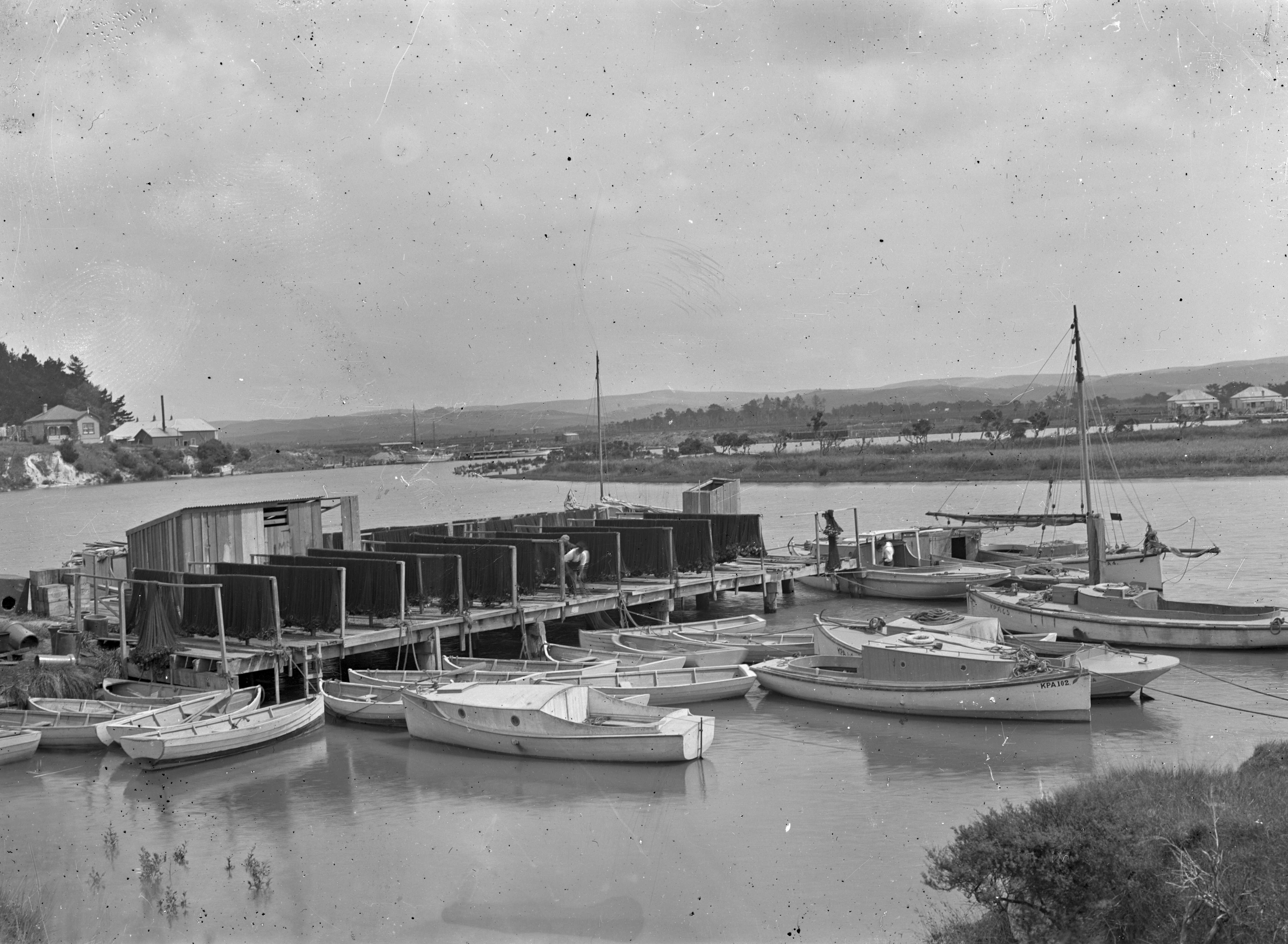
Fishing boats with nets drying on the Kaipara River at Helensville, early 20th century

Management of the Kaipara Harbour does not have a central administration. Management is distributed among the Kaipara District Council, Auckland Council, Northland Regional Council, the Department of Conservation's Northland and Auckland section, and the Ministry of Fisheries.

The Ministry of Fishing allocates quota for the north-western region of New Zealand as a whole, but does not tailor quota specifically for the Kaipara. Local iwi feel they are not sufficiently involved in management issues, and to further compound matters, the local iwi is split between Te Uri-o-Hau in the northern part and Te Taoū in the southern part.

== Timeline ==
- c. 1300: The Maori chief Rongomai arrives in his canoe Māhuhu from Hawaiki, and is drowned at the harbour entrance.
- 1807 or 1808: Ngapuhi fight Ngāti Whātua, Te-Uri-o-Hau and Te Roroa iwi at the battle of Moremonui on the west coast of Northland, the first battle in which Maori used muskets.
- 1839: European settlers begin arriving to fell and mill kauri trees.
- 1840: The Aurora, a 550-ton barque, is the first European ship to be wrecked at the entrance.
- 1860s: The timber industry is established.
- 1899: The timber industry peaks.
- c. 1939: Timber trade ends, and the area becomes a backwater.
- 2002: Crown settles historical claims of Te Uri o Hau
- 2005: Filmmaker Barry Barclay makes his documentary, The Kaipara Affair.
- 2008: Biomarine receives resource consent to establish an oyster farm
- 2008: Crest Energy receives resource consent to install tidal turbines

== See also ==
- Aotearoa Wave and Tidal Energy Association
- Alan Gibbs – Gibbs Farm
- List of deepest natural harbours
