= Wairua River =

Coordinates: 35°47′S 174°03′E

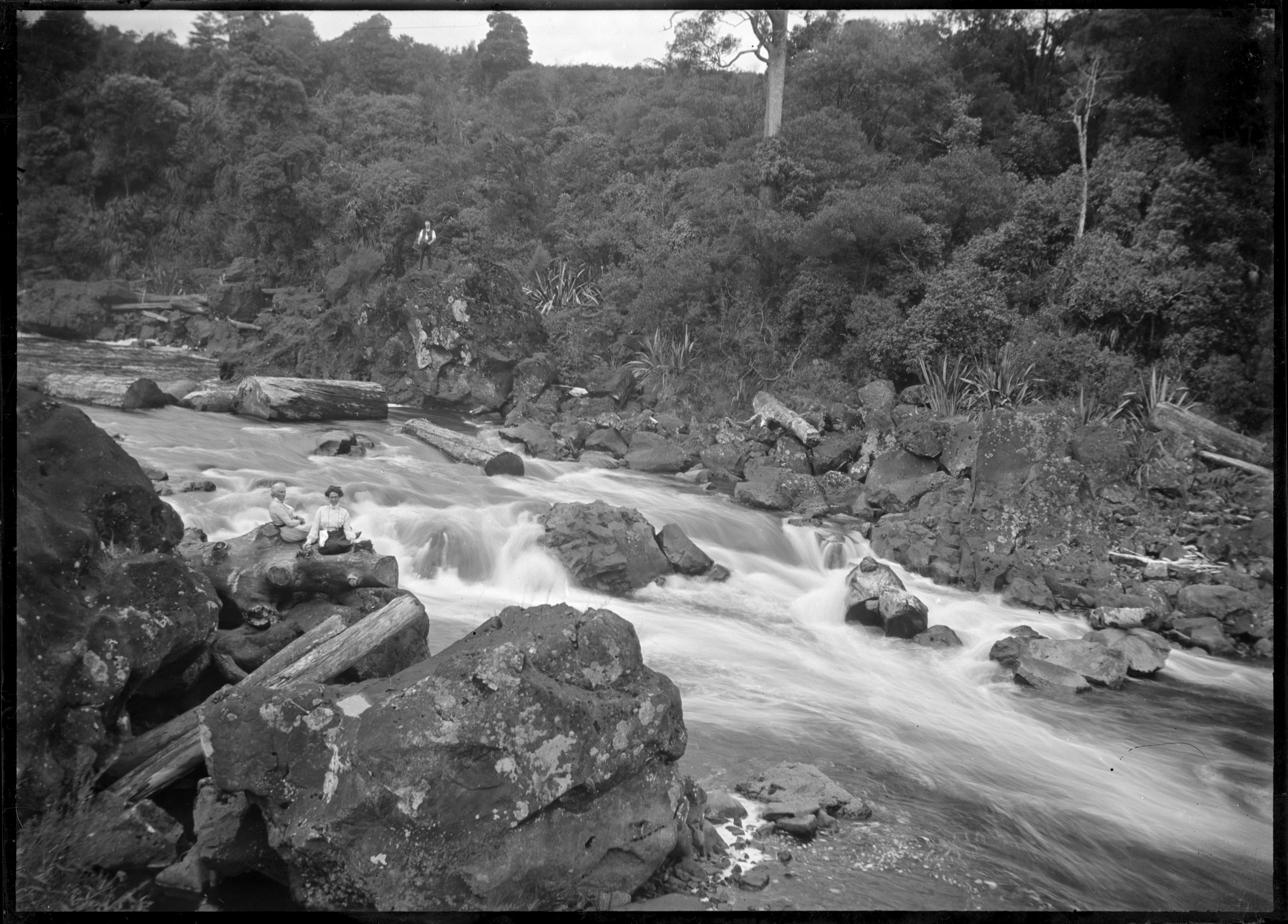
- The rapids on the Wairua River below the Wairua Falls, 1911

Location
- Country: New Zealand

The Wairua River is a river of Northland, New Zealand. It flows south-west from Hikurangi, north of Whangārei, and joins the Mangakāhia River between Titoki and Tangiteroria to form the Wairoa River, which runs past Dargaville to the Kaipara Harbour.

== See also ==
- List of rivers of New Zealand
