= Manganui River (Northland) =

Coordinates: 35.906364°S 173.949899°E

Location
- Country: New Zealand

Physical characteristics
- Mouth
  - location: Wairoa River
- Length: 53 km (33 mi)

New Zealand's largest Manganui River is a river of the Northland Region of New Zealand's North Island. It follows a generally westward course from its sources west of Ruakaka before its outflow into the Wairoa River 5 kilometres (3 mi) east of Dargaville. The river's lower course is noted for its convoluted, winding path through low-lying swampy terrain, and several oxbow lakes are associated with this stretch of the river.

== See also ==
- List of rivers of New Zealand
