= Glorit =

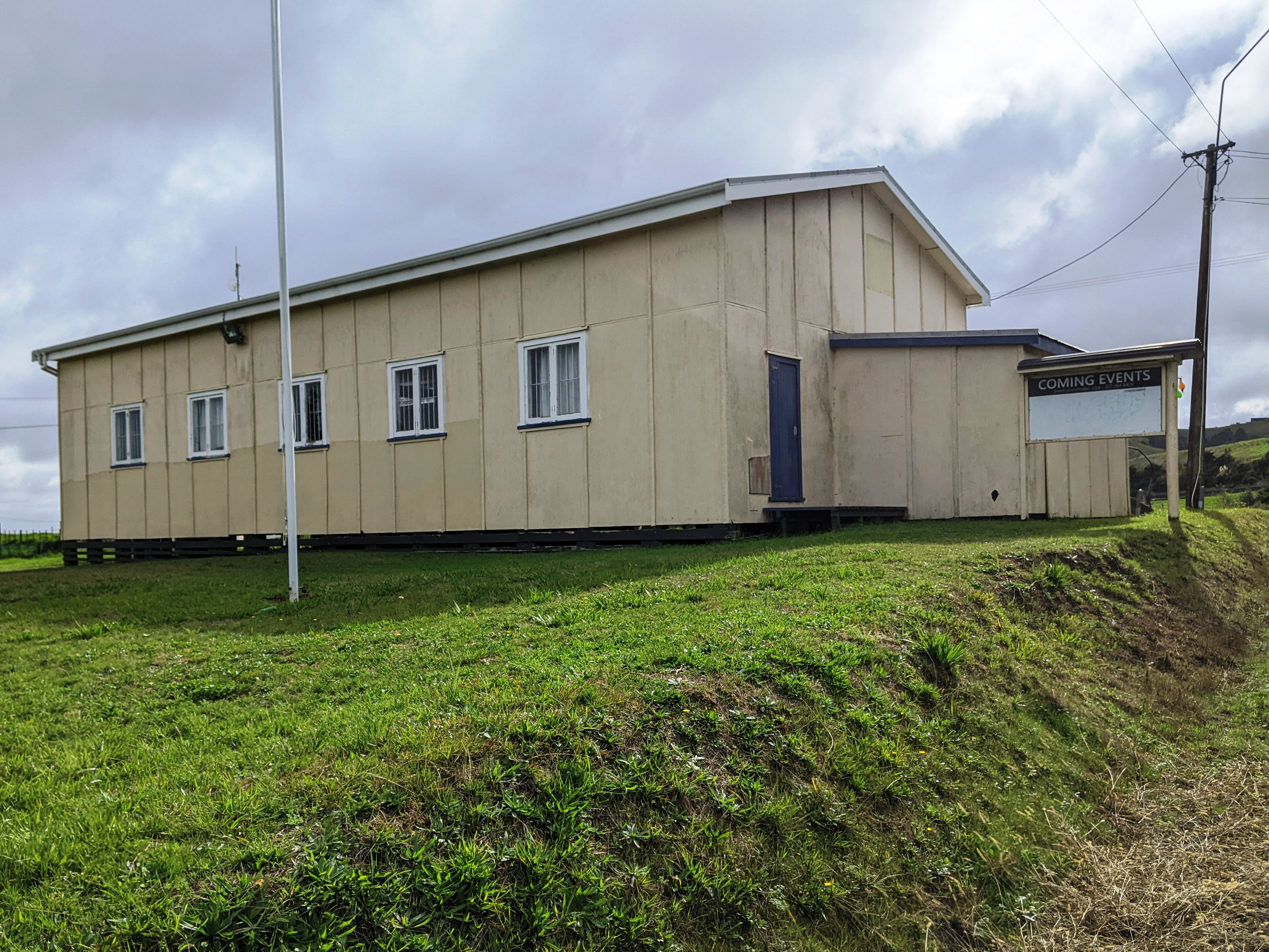
- Glorit community hall
- Interactive map of Glorit
- Coordinates: 36.464716°S 174.445907°E
- Country: New Zealand
- Region: Auckland Region
- Ward: Rodney ward
- Local board: Rodney Local Board
- Subdivision: Kumeū subdivision
- Electorates: Kaipara ki Mahurangi; Te Tai Tokerau

Government
  - Territorial Authority: Auckland Council
  - Mayor of Auckland: Wayne Brown
  - Kaipara ki Mahurangi MP: Chris Penk
  - Te Tai Tokerau MP: Mariameno Kapa-Kingi

Glorit is a rural community in the Auckland Region of New Zealand's North Island. State Highway 16 runs through the area, connecting to Tauhoa 12 km to the north and Helensville to the south.

The settlement was established in 1868 and celebrated its 150th anniversary in 2018.

A falling transmission tower at Glorit caused a power outage on 20 June 2024 that affected almost 100,000 properties in Northland, which is most of the region. The fallen tower was visible from SH16.

== Demographics ==
Glorit is in an SA1 statistical area which covers 34.95 km^{2} (13.49 sq mi). The SA1 area is part of the larger Kaipara Hills statistical area.

Historical population
Year	Pop.	±% p.a.
2006	60	—
2013	90	+5.96%
2018	120	+5.92%
2023	108	−2.09%

The SA1 statistical area had a population of 108 in the 2023 New Zealand census, a decrease of 12 people (−10.0%) since the 2018 census, and an increase of 18 people (20.0%) since the 2013 census. There were 57 males, 51 females and 3 people of other genders in 45 dwellings. 2.8% of people identified as LGBTIQ+. The median age was 41.7 years (compared with 38.1 years nationally). There were 21 people (19.4%) aged under 15 years, 18 (16.7%) aged 15 to 29, 54 (50.0%) aged 30 to 64, and 18 (16.7%) aged 65 or older.

People could identify as more than one ethnicity. The results were 83.3% European (Pākehā), 36.1% Māori, and 5.6% Pasifika. English was spoken by 97.2%, Māori language by 8.3%, and other languages by 5.6%. No language could be spoken by 5.6% (e.g. too young to talk). The percentage of people born overseas was 22.2, compared with 28.8% nationally.

Religious affiliations were 16.7% Christian, and 2.8% Māori religious beliefs. People who answered that they had no religion were 69.4%, and 11.1% of people did not answer the census question.

Of those at least 15 years old, 9 (10.3%) people had a bachelor's or higher degree, 48 (55.2%) had a post-high school certificate or diploma, and 30 (34.5%) people exclusively held high school qualifications. The median income was $39,200, compared with $41,500 nationally. 12 people (13.8%) earned over $100,000 compared to 12.1% nationally. The employment status of those at least 15 was that 45 (51.7%) people were employed full-time and 12 (13.8%) were part-time.
