= Mangawhai Harbour =

Harbour in Northland Region, New Zealand

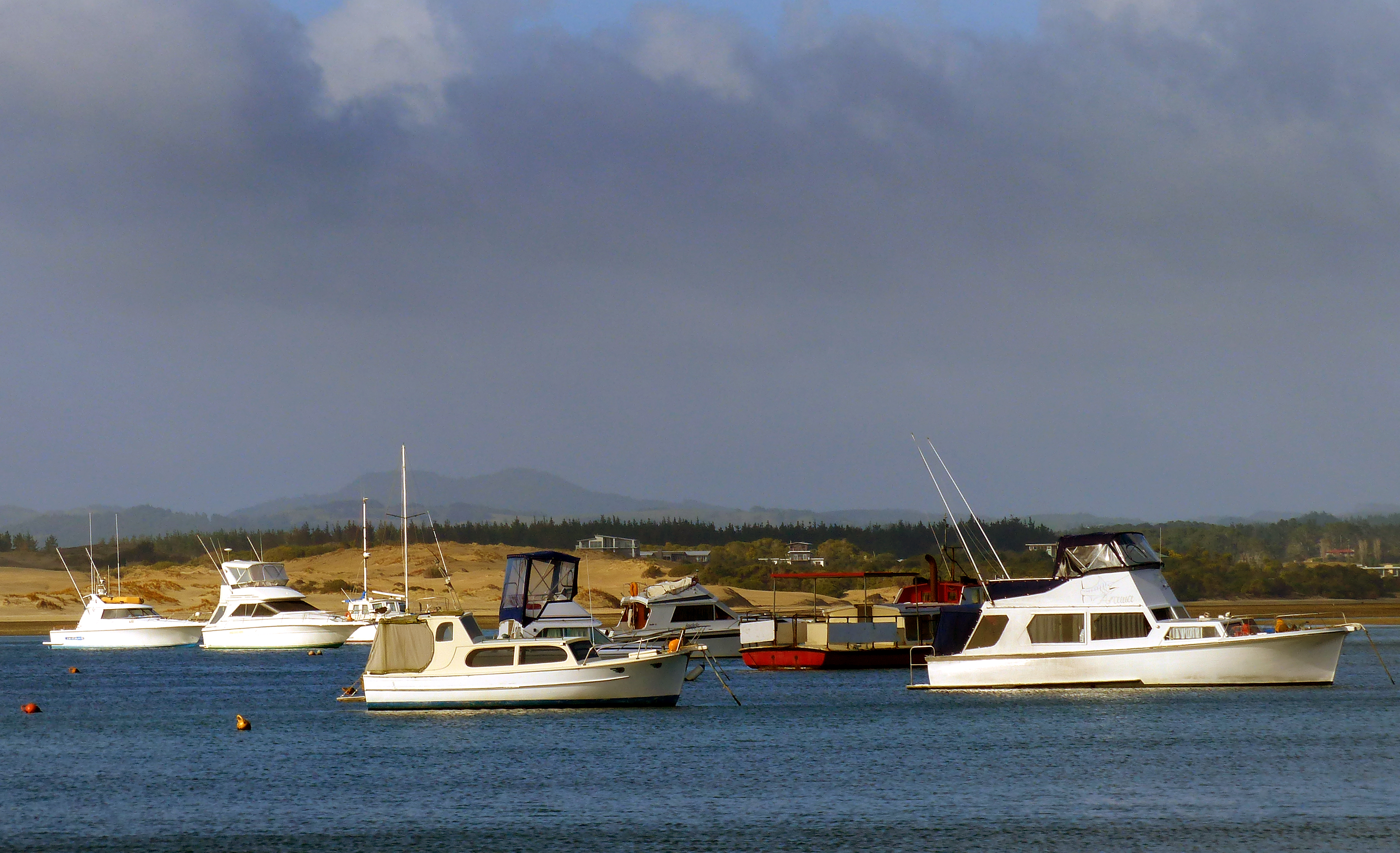
- Location: Kaipara District, Northland
- Coordinates: 36.10°S 174.59°E
- River sources: Bob Creek, Mangawhai River, Tara Creek
- Ocean/sea sources: Pacific Ocean
- Basin countries: New Zealand
- Max. length: 9.1 km (5.7 mi)
- Max. width: 0.94 km (0.58 mi)
- Settlements: Mangawhai, Mangawhai Heads

Location and extent of Mangawhai Harbour

Mangawhai Harbour is a natural harbour on the east coast of the Kaipara District in Northland, New Zealand. It is separated from the ocean by a sandspit, which is protected for wildlife conservation as the Mangawhai Government Purpose Wildlife Refuge Reserve. The townships of Mangawhai and Mangawhai Heads sit beside the harbour.

== Geography ==
Mangawhai Harbour is situated five kilometres south of Paepae-o-Tū / Bream Tail, a major headland in the Northland Region. A large sandspit separates the harbour from the ocean. The central section of the harbour is called Mangawhai Estuary. It is fed by a number of tributaries, including the Mangawhai River, Bob Creek and Tara Creek.

== Flora and fauna ==
The sandspit is a 245-hectare nature reserve called the Mangawhai Government Purpose Wildlife Refuge Reserve. It is a feeding ground and/or breeding ground for migratory and endangered shorebird species, such as Caspian terns, New Zealand fairy terns, variable oystercatchers and New Zealand dotterels. Spinifex and pīngao grow there.

== History ==
Mangawhai Harbour is a part of the rohe of Te Uri-o-Hau, a tribal group either seen as an independent iwi, or as a hapū of Ngāti Whātua. The name refers to Te Whai, a historic rangatira of Ngāti Whātua, who shares his name with the short-tail stingray (whai) found in the harbour. Te Whai had a fortified pā at Mangawhai Point, a central headland in the harbour, near the southern point of Mangawhai Heads township. The harbour was an important connection between the east and west coasts of Northland, as it was a part of the Ōtamatea portage, a place which allowed waka to be hauled overland between the Mangawhai Harbour and the Kaipara Harbour, via the Kaiwaka River, Hakaru River and Otamatea River. Forty-one archaeological sites have been identified around the harbour.

Mangawhai Harbour was purchased by the Crown in 1858, with European settlers using the harbour from 1859, primarily for the kauri logging and kauri gum industries. As these industries dwindled, dairy farming and sheep farming became the main industries around the harbour. Two European settlements developed around the harbour, Mangawhai to the south-west and Mangawhai Heads to the north.

In 1864, the British schooner Three Brothers hit the sandbar at the mouth of the Mangawhai Harbour. Two passengers were washed overboard and drowned.

Sand mining began at the Mangawhai Harbour entrance pre-1940. In 1978 the collapse of sand dunes, believed to be caused by sand mining, closed the harbour for five and a half years. Commercial sand mining ceased in 2004.
