= Otamatea County =

Former North Island county in New Zealand

- County of New Zealand
- 1887–1989
- Capital: Paparoa
- Area
  - Coordinates: 36°5′54″S 174°14′22″E
- History
  - Established: 1887
  - Disestablished: 1989
- Today part of: Kaipara District

Otamatea County was one of the counties of New Zealand in the North Island, from 1887 until 1989. It was created by the Counties Act 1886, which came into effect on 1 January 1887, from parts of the existing Hobson, Rodney and Whangarei Counties. The county seat was at Paparoa. In the 1989 local government reforms, Otamatea County merged with Dargaville Borough, Hobson County and parts of Rodney County and Whangarei County to create Kaipara District.

== Geography ==
Along the county's eastern boundary was the shoreline between Bream Tail and the Mangawhai Heads. The western boundary follows the inner Kaipara Harbour north of the Oruawharo River up to the Wairoa River. The area is dominated by rolling hills with the Kaipara Flats in the northwest and the Brynderwyns in the northeast.

The southern boundary with Rodney County was along the Hakaru River.

== Economy ==
The economy of the area is dominated by farming and the large amount of rivers that drain into the Kaipara Harbour led to Otamatea County having the most-developed agricultural sector in Northland. In 1984 85% of the land of the county was farmland.

Around 3,500 ha (8,600 acres) of poor quality land near Tinopai and Topuri is used for forestry.

The Ruawai flats produce a large amount of sweet potato.

== See also ==
- List of former territorial authorities in New Zealand § Counties
