= Hobson County =

Coordinates: 35.9°S 173.85°E

- County of New Zealand
- 1876–1989
- Map of Hobson County with ridings shown
- Capital: Aratapu (1876–1909); Dargaville (1909–1989)
- History
  - Established: 1876
  - Disestablished: 1989
- Today part of: Kaipara District

Hobson County was one of the counties of New Zealand in the North Island, from 1876 until 1989. It came into existence in November 1876, when the provinces were abolished. The county seat was at Aratapu, on the western bank of the Wairoa River, 9.5 kilometres (5.9 mi) south of Dargaville, until 1909, when it moved to Dargaville. In 1908, the town of Dargaville and neighboroughing Mangawhare split from Hobson County to form Dargaville Borough. In the 1989 local government reforms, Hobson County re-amalgamated with Dargaville Borough and merged with Otamatea County and parts of Rodney County and Whangarei County to create Kaipara District.

== See also ==
- List of former territorial authorities in New Zealand § Counties
