= Topuni River =

River in the North Island, New Zealand

- Mouth of the Topuni River Topuni River (Northland Region) Topuni River (New Zealand)
- Route of the Topuni River

Location
- Country: New Zealand
- Region: Northland Region, Auckland Region

Physical characteristics
- Source: Hakaru River
  - coordinates: 36.2107°S 174.4831°E
- Mouth: Oruawharo River
  - coordinates: 36.2578°S 174.47°E
- Length: 12 km (7.5 mi)

Basin features
- Progression: Topuni River → Oruawharo River → Kaipara Harbour → Tasman Sea

The Topuni River is a river in the upper North Island of New Zealand. From its source on the Hakaru River, it flows generally south, with most of its length being through a drowned valley in the northeast of the Kaipara Harbour system. The estuarine section of the river forms a part of the border between the Kaipara District of the Northland Region and the Rodney local board area of the Auckland Region. The Topuni River flows into Oruawharo River — an arm of the Kaipara — 10 kilometres northwest of Wellsford.

== See also ==
- List of rivers of New Zealand
