= Mangawhai River =

Coordinates: 36°04′S 174°35′E

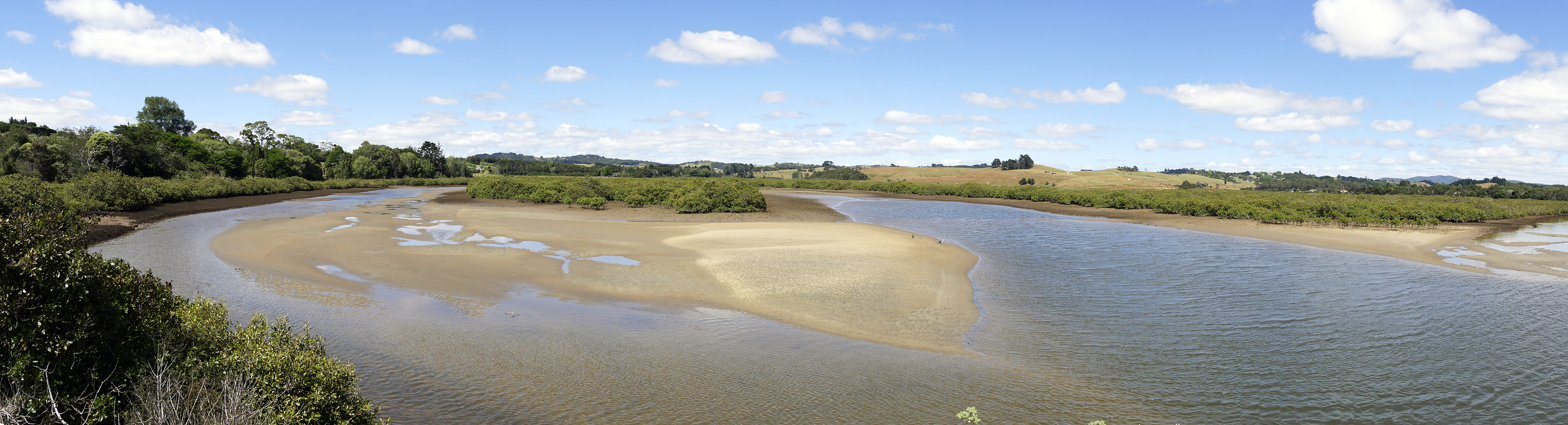
- Mangawhai Harbour

Location
- Country: New Zealand
- Region: Northland Region

Physical characteristics
- Mouth
  - location: Manganui River (Northland)

Mangawhai River, Northland NZ

The Mangawhai River is a river of the Northland Region of New Zealand. It flows into the Mangawhai Estuary, Mangawhai Harbour and then into the Pacific Ocean.

== See also ==
- List of rivers of New Zealand
