= Peter Panyoczki =

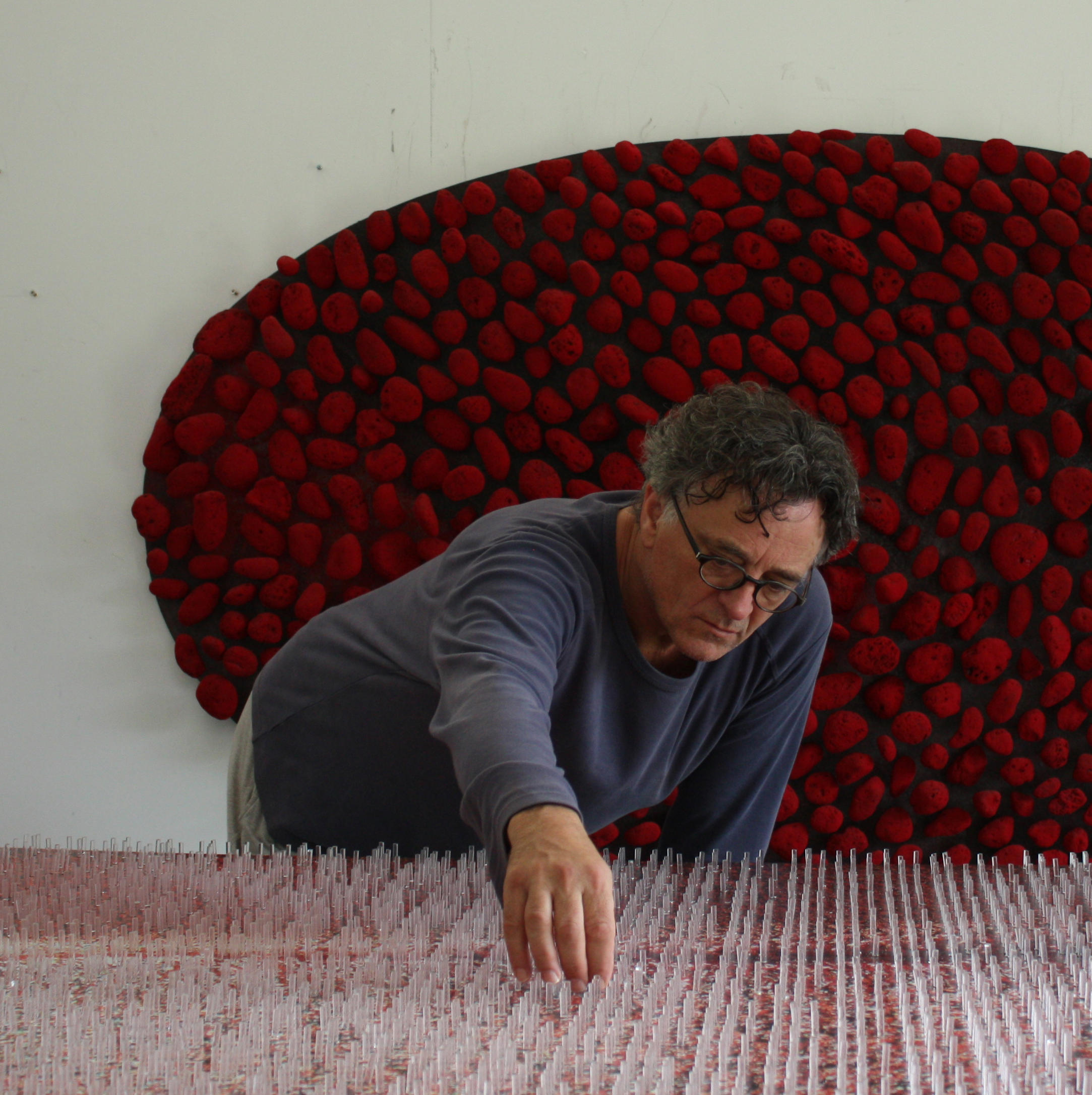
- Panyoczki in his studio
- Born: 30 October 1953 (age 72); Budapest, Hungary
- Education: University of Zurich
- Known for: Visual art

Peter Panyoczki (born 30 October 1953) is a Hungarian, Swiss, and New Zealand artist based in Kaiwaka, New Zealand. Panyoczki has exhibited in Switzerland, USA, Germany, Italy, Hungary, France, and Japan.

== Career ==
Three-year-old Panyoczki escapes with his parents to Switzerland after the Hungarian Revolution of 1956. Between 1969 and 1974 he attends Kollegium Gymnasium Schwyz before he begins his studies at the University of Zurich (German language and literature, art history, and English literature) where he obtains his master's degree in 1980. A year earlier, he started as an assistant for German language at the Purdue University in Lafayette, Indiana in the United States. During the two years he spent there, he wrote and directed a film based on Samuel Beckett's short story First Love. Between 1982 and 1986, he makes various studies in Rotterdam, Florence, and Vienna and teaches classes of language and art. In 1990, he starts a project in Barcelona. The project "Hannibal" was a meditative travel and research on Vanitas through Northern Africa. During his travels, he creates a poetic video the title of which was Hannibal.

In 1992, Panyoczki visits New Zealand for the first time, and a year later he realizes the first part of the Babylon-Project which was an interactive artistic dialogue with János Kalmár and Joerg Spamer at the Goethe-Institut in Budapest. In 1995, Panyoczki moves to New Zealand and becomes a resident and the same year his son Janos is born. In 1999, he starts a project in New Zealand. The Kaipara Foundation was aimed to create a platform, where artists, scientists, musicians etc. from NZ and overseas had a possibility to meet and to stay in residence, to work and communicate their ideas at seminars and symposiums. The Kaipara Foundation has been taken over by the Wallace Arts Foundation in 2014. Panyoczki was one of the five judges in the 2014 Wallace Art Awards, the biggest and longest-surviving art awards in New Zealand.

Today Panyoczki lives on two continents and is permanently on the move which is also reflected in his work that is permeated by signs of presence during absence. He belongs to the 1980s generation of artists who polemically rejected conceptual art yet did not simply return to figurative art, instead having a conceptual interest in the question of art as a medium: art is perceived as a medium when its visibility is put to the test. His work expresses the paradox of communication that refuses to reveal itself by providing information of what it is made of. It is pleasantly free of morality, while at the same time it does not avoid the tension created by self-irony and a socially reflected cultural criticism.

== Private life ==
Panyoczki is married to Tatjana, a jewellery artist. They live in Kaiwaka, New Zealand.

== Bibliography ==
- Monographie (1996)
- Distance and Proximity (2004)
- Surface and Beneath (2016)

== See also ==
- Wallace Art Awards
