= Hakaru River =

Coordinates: 36°12′39″S 174°28′58″E

Location
- Country: New Zealand

Physical characteristics
- Source
  - location: Kaipara District
- Mouth
  - location: Topuni River
- Length: 30 km (19 mi)

Basin features
- Bridges: Hakaru Bridge

The Hakaru River is a river in the Northland Region of New Zealand. It starts in the Brynderwyn Hills and flows south to join the Topuni River exiting in the Oruawharo River, which forms part of the Kaipara Harbour.

The name literally means "to shake" in the Māori language. Traditionally it was known as Te Hakoru to Te Tai Tokerau Māori, but was transcribed as Hakaru on an 1870 map.

The Hakaru River formed part of the boundary between Otamatea and Rodney Counties.

== See also ==
- List of rivers of New Zealand
