= Grace Gooder =

New Zealand cricketer (1924–1983)

Personal information
- Full name: Grace Patricia Gooder
- Born: 22 March 1924; Auckland, New Zealand
- Died: 21 March 1983 (aged 58); Auckland, New Zealand
- Batting: Right-handed
- Bowling: Right-arm medium
- Role: Bowler

International information
- National side: New Zealand (1949)
- Only Test (cap 25): 26 March 1949 v England

Domestic team information
- Years: Team
- 1943/44–1952/53: Auckland

Career statistics
Competition	WTest	WFC
Matches	1	16
Runs scored	11	142
Batting average	5.50	9.46
100s/50s	0/0	0/0
Top score	11	16
Balls bowled	236	1,366
Wickets	8	51
Bowling average	9.12	13.20
5 wickets in innings	1	4
10 wickets in match	0	1
Best bowling	6/42	6/35
Catches/stumpings	0/–	9/–
- Source: CricketArchive, 27 November 2021

Grace Patricia Gooder (22 March 1924 – 21 March 1983) was a New Zealand cricketer and nurse. She played cricket as a right-arm medium bowler. She played one Test match for New Zealand in 1949. She is one of thirteen cricketers to have taken a five-wicket haul on their debut in women's Test cricket. On her only international appearance, she claimed six wickets for the concession of 42 runs in the first innings against England. She played domestic cricket for Auckland. Gooder later trained as a nurse and was the head nurse at Mt Eden Prison from 1974 until her death.

== Early life ==
Gooder was born in 1924 in Ruawai, where she grew up on the family farm and attended Ruawai School with her two sisters. The farm was lost during the Depression and the family moved to Takapuna, where Gooder was enrolled at Takapuna Grammar School.

== Career ==
Gooder worked as a clerk for North Shore Transport before training in England as a nurse. She trained in psychiatric nursing at Netherne Hospital and later trained in general nursing. She was awarded a gold medal for nursing at the St James Hospital in London.

Gooder became a pioneer of integrated nursing, the inclusion of psychiatric considerations in treating patients, and published articles promoting the approach. She worked as a senior nurse at Oakley Hospital in Auckland from the early 1960s, and then in 1974 moved to Mt Eden Prison, where she was appointed as head nurse. She worked at the prison until her sudden death from stroke in 1983.

== Private life ==
As a teenager Gooder had a boyfriend, who was killed in 1942 while serving overseas when his Wellington bomber crashed. Gooder was however a lesbian, and sought help for her attraction to women at the Queen Mary Hospital in Hanmer Springs. There a staff member suggested to her that "she simply had to accept who she was". Gooder later formed a life-long relationship with a nurse she met at Oakley Hospital.
