= Mangawhai Heads =

Settlement in New Zealand

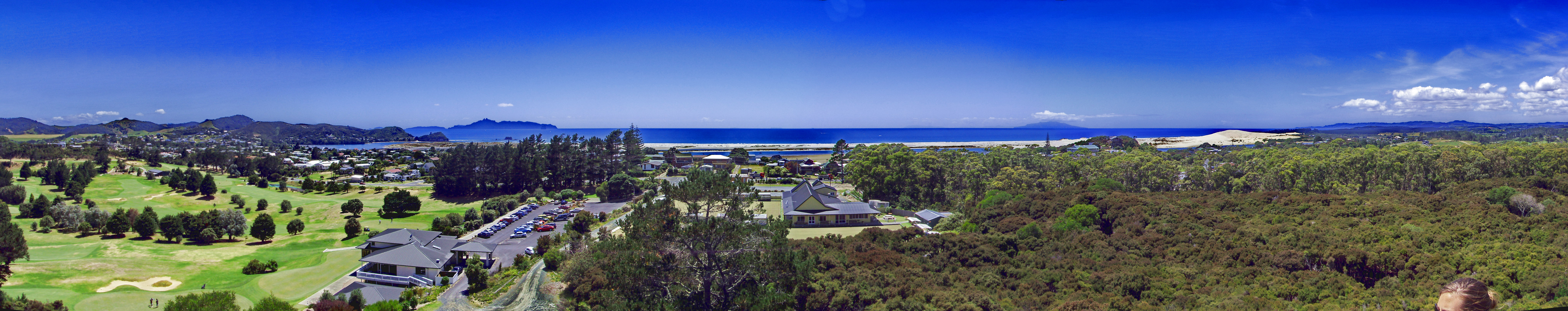
- Interactive map of Mangawhai Heads
- Coordinates: 36.095°S 174.586°E
- Country: New Zealand
- Region: Northland Region
- District: Kaipara District
- Ward: Kaiwaka-Mangawhai Ward
- Electorates: Northland; Te Tai Tokerau

Government
  - Territorial Authority: Kaipara District Council
  - Regional council: Northland Regional Council
  - Mayor of Kaipara: Jonathan Larsen
  - Northland MP: Grant McCallum
  - Te Tai Tokerau MP: Mariameno Kapa-Kingi

Area
  - Total: 6.99 km^{2} (2.70 sq mi)

Population (June 2025)
  - Total: 2,760
  - Density: 395/km^{2} (1,020/sq mi)

Mangawhai Heads is a township on the northern part of the Mangawhai Harbour in Northland, New Zealand. By road, Waipu is 21 kilometres northwest, and Mangawhai is 5 kilometres southwest.

== Geography ==
The Mangawhai Cliffs Walkway, north of the township, is a 4.5-kilometre walk to Paepae-o-Tū / Bream Tail, and has a lookout point.

Mangawhai Heads Beach is an intermediate-level surf beach.

== History ==
The Mangawhai Harbour is a part of the rohe of Te Uri-o-Hau, a tribal group either seen as an independent iwi, or as a hapū of Ngāti Whātua. The name refers to Te Whai, a historic rangatira of Ngāti Whātua, who shares his name with the short-tail stingray, whai, found in the harbour. Te Uri o Hau had a fortified pā down Tara Road, which is facing the beach.

Sand has been mined at Mangawhai Harbour since at least the 1940s. In 1978 the collapse of sand dunes, believed to be caused by sand mining, closed the harbour for five and a half years. From 1993 to 2004, sand was commercially suction-dredged from the sandbars of Mangawhai Heads. In 2004, the Mangawhai Harbour Restoration Society won an Environment Court decision to stop the issue of new licences. The companies, such as McCallum Brothers, re-applied to the Auckland Regional Council for resource consent but the application was turned down in 2005. In January 2008 another application to sand mine in the Mangawhai Forest was being heard by the Environment Court.

Mangawhai Museum, which opened in its present building in 2014, features displays on the area's local history.

A new subdivision called The Rise or Mangawhai North is planned northwest of the existing settlement.

== Demographics ==
Mangawhai Heads covers 6.99 km^{2} (2.70 sq mi) and had an estimated population of 2,760 as of June 2025, with a population density of 395 people per km^{2}.

Historical population
Year	Pop.	±% p.a.
2006	927	—
2013	1,239	+4.23%
2018	1,995	+10.00%
2023	2,685	+6.12%

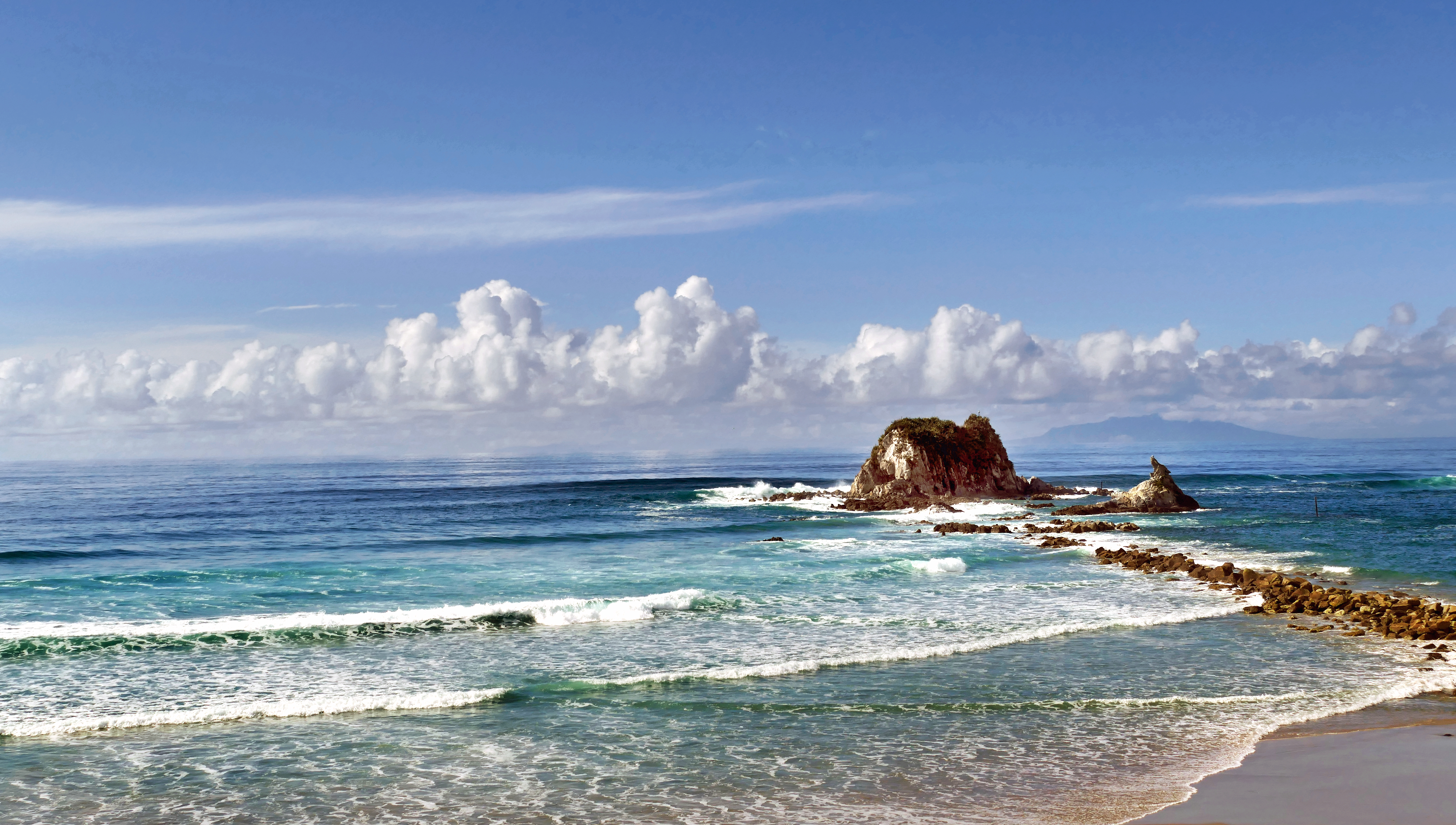
Mangawhai Heads Beach

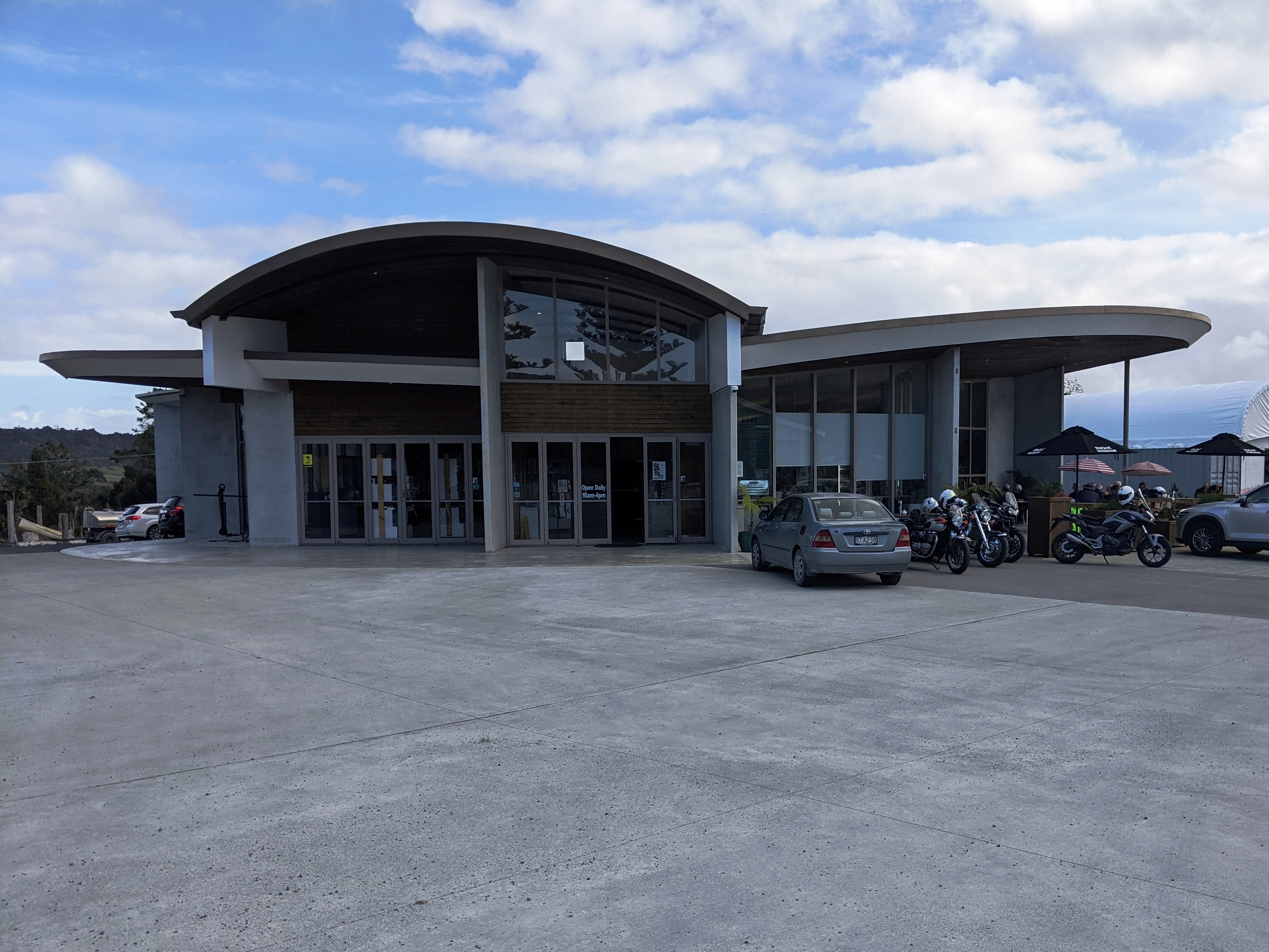
Mangawhai Museum

Mangawhai Heads had a population of 2,685 in the 2023 New Zealand census, an increase of 690 people (34.6%) since the 2018 census, and an increase of 1,446 people (116.7%) since the 2013 census. There were 1,314 males, 1,359 females and 12 people of other genders in 1,101 dwellings. 2.1% of people identified as LGBTIQ+. The median age was 51.0 years (compared with 38.1 years nationally). There were 429 people (16.0%) aged under 15 years, 303 (11.3%) aged 15 to 29, 1,077 (40.1%) aged 30 to 64, and 876 (32.6%) aged 65 or older.

People could identify as more than one ethnicity. The results were 92.1% European (Pākehā); 13.1% Māori; 2.8% Pasifika; 3.8% Asian; 0.9% Middle Eastern, Latin American and African New Zealanders (MELAA); and 2.5% other, which includes people giving their ethnicity as "New Zealander". English was spoken by 98.3%, Māori language by 2.0%, Samoan by 0.2%, and other languages by 7.8%. No language could be spoken by 1.3% (e.g. too young to talk). New Zealand Sign Language was known by 0.3%. The percentage of people born overseas was 21.9, compared with 28.8% nationally.

Religious affiliations were 28.6% Christian, 0.7% Hindu, 0.2% Islam, 0.1% Māori religious beliefs, 0.6% Buddhist, 0.4% New Age, 0.2% Jewish, and 0.7% other religions. People who answered that they had no religion were 62.3%, and 6.3% of people did not answer the census question.

Of those at least 15 years old, 402 (17.8%) people had a bachelor's or higher degree, 1,263 (56.0%) had a post-high school certificate or diploma, and 489 (21.7%) people exclusively held high school qualifications. The median income was $34,400, compared with $41,500 nationally. 261 people (11.6%) earned over $100,000 compared to 12.1% nationally. The employment status of those at least 15 was that 855 (37.9%) people were employed full-time, 351 (15.6%) were part-time, and 51 (2.3%) were unemployed.
