= Whakaki River =

Coordinates: 36°16′S 174°20′E

Location
- Country: New Zealand

Physical characteristics
- Mouth
  - location: Kaipara Harbour
- Length: 7 km (4.3 mi)

The Whakaki River is located in the Northland Region of New Zealand's North Island. Despite its name, it is better described as a silty arm of the Kaipara Harbour. It flows northwest to reach the Otamatea River.

== See also ==
- List of rivers of New Zealand
