= Mangawhai =

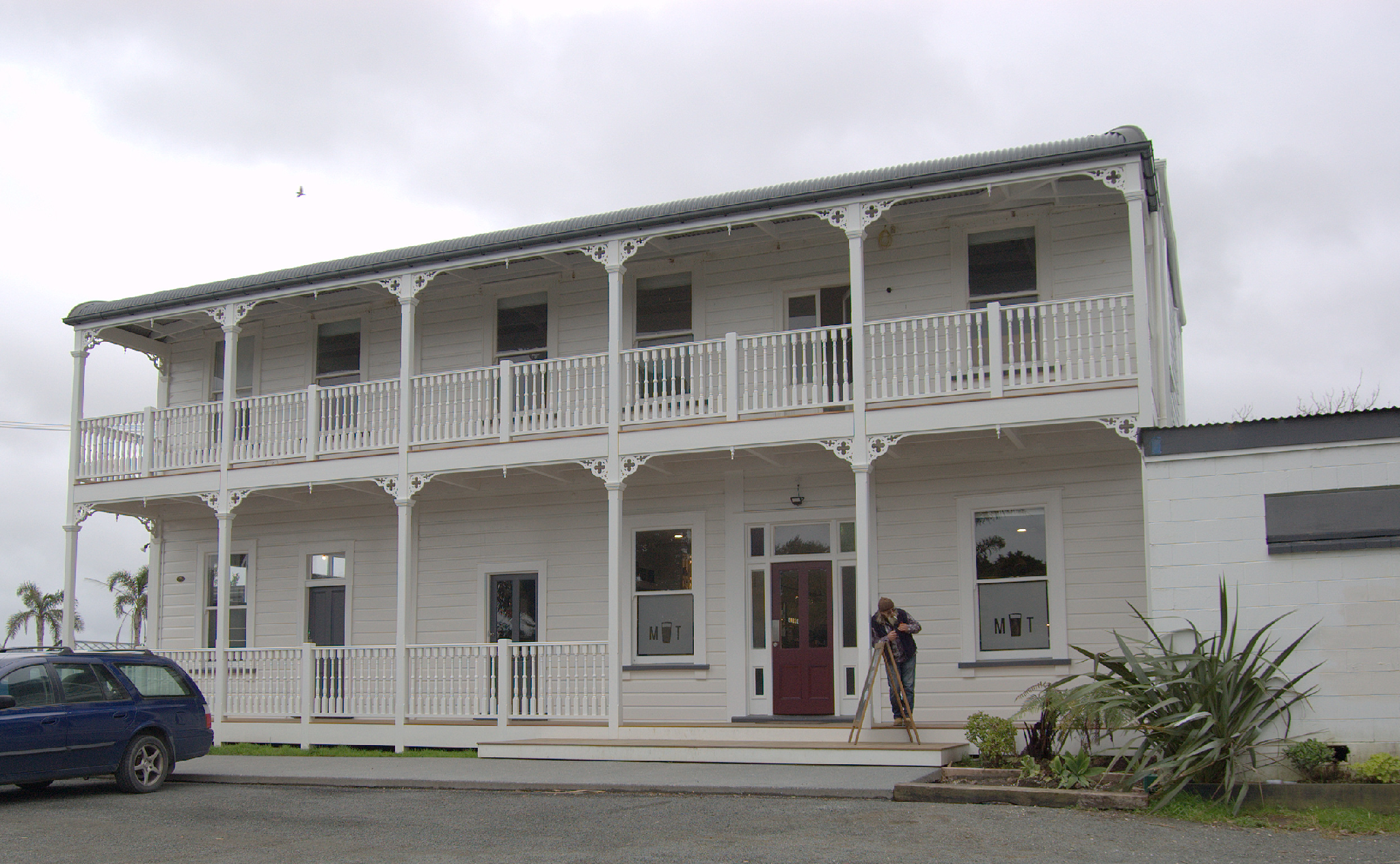
- Mangawhai Tavern in 2019, built 1890
- Interactive map of Mangawhai
- Coordinates: 36°7′35″S 174°34′29″E
- Country: New Zealand
- Region: Northland Region
- District: Kaipara District
- Ward: Kaiwaka-Mangawhai Ward

Government
  - Territorial authority: Kaipara District Council
  - Regional council: Northland Regional Council
  - Mayor of Kaipara: Jonathan Larsen
  - Northland MP: Grant McCallum
  - Te Tai Tokerau MP: TBD

Area
  - Total: 1.89 km^{2} (0.73 sq mi)

Population (June 2025)
  - Total: 1,290
  - Density: 683/km^{2} (1,770/sq mi)

Mangawhai is a township at the south-west extent of the Mangawhai Harbour, or Mangawhai Estuary, in Northland, New Zealand. The adjacent township of Mangawhai Heads is 5 km north-east, on the lower part of the harbour. Kaiwaka is 13 km south-west, and Te Ārai 13 km south.

== History ==
Mangawhai is the traditional Māori name for the area, referring to the stingrays (whai) that live in the harbour. In the early and mid 19th century, Mangawhai Harbour was one of the main access points for the Kaipara Harbour. Ngāti Whātua used to drag waka from Kaiwaka to Mangawhai. A Ngā Puhi war party landed at Mangawhai in February 1825 and moved 12 km inland to confront the Ngāti Whātua at Te Ika-a-ranga-nui near Kaiwaka.

Later in the 19th century, settlers would travel by boat from Auckland to Mangawhai, walk to Kaiwaka, and then travel on the water again across the Kaipara Harbour. By the early 1860s, a dray road existed between Mangawhai and Kaiwaka. In the latter 19th century, the kauri gum digging trade became an important industry in the area. A wharf was built near the hotel in the 1880s and demolished in 1950. The hotel burnt down in 1890 and was rebuilt, and still stands as the Mangawhai Tavern. On 26 January 2025 Mangawhai was hit by a tornado that caused extensive damage and two serious injuries.

In 2018 it was proposed to develop a new town between Mangawhai and Mangawhai Heads, called Mangawhai Central, to accommodate the rapid increase of population expected and overcome the space limitations of the existing commercial areas. The business area was largely complete by the end of 2022 but the residential development stalled. A new residential area called Mangawhai Hills is planned west of the existing settlement.

== Governance ==
The Mangawai Road District was formed 26 September 1867. It first operated 29 October 1869 and was transferred from Rodney County to the nascent Otamatea County in 1886.

== Demographics ==
Mangawhai township covers 1.89 km^{2} (0.73 sq mi) and had an estimated population of 1,290 as of June 2025, with a population density of 683 people per km^{2}.

Historical population for Mangawhai township
Year	Pop.	±% p.a.
2006	348	—
2013	507	+5.52%
2018	936	+13.05%
2023	1,206	+5.20%

Mangawhai had a population of 1,206 in the 2023 New Zealand census, an increase of 270 people (28.8%) since the 2018 census, and an increase of 699 people (137.9%) since the 2013 census. There were 585 males and 624 females in 528 dwellings. 1.7% of people identified as LGBTIQ+. The median age was 50.6 years (compared with 38.1 years nationally). There were 228 people (18.9%) aged under 15 years, 99 (8.2%) aged 15 to 29, 480 (39.8%) aged 30 to 64, and 399 (33.1%) aged 65 or older.

People could identify as more than one ethnicity. The results were 94.3% European (Pākehā); 12.4% Māori; 2.2% Pasifika; 3.5% Asian; 0.7% Middle Eastern, Latin American and African New Zealanders (MELAA); and 1.5% other, which includes people giving their ethnicity as "New Zealander". English was spoken by 98.0%, Māori language by 2.0%, Samoan by 0.2%, and other languages by 7.5%. No language could be spoken by 1.7% (e.g. too young to talk). New Zealand Sign Language was known by 0.5%. The percentage of people born overseas was 20.6, compared with 28.8% nationally.

Religious affiliations were 24.4% Christian, 0.7% Hindu, 0.5% Māori religious beliefs, 0.7% Buddhist, 0.2% New Age, 0.2% Jewish, and 1.5% other religions. People who answered that they had no religion were 66.9%, and 4.7% of people did not answer the census question.

Of those at least 15 years old, 147 (15.0%) people had a bachelor's or higher degree, 564 (57.7%) had a post-high school certificate or diploma, and 225 (23.0%) people exclusively held high school qualifications. The median income was $32,600, compared with $41,500 nationally. 90 people (9.2%) earned over $100,000 compared to 12.1% nationally. The employment status of those at least 15 was that 375 (38.3%) people were employed full-time, 144 (14.7%) were part-time, and 15 (1.5%) were unemployed.

=== Rural surrounds ===
Mangawhai Rural, which surrounds but does not include Mangawhai township and Mangawhai Heads, covers 91.56 km^{2} (35.35 sq mi) and had an estimated population of 3,150 as of June 2025, with a population density of 34 people per km^{2}.

Historical population for Mangawhai Rural
Year	Pop.	±% p.a.
2006	1,032	—
2013	1,398	+4.43%
2018	2,100	+8.48%
2023	2,940	+6.96%

Mangawhai Rural had a population of 2,940 in the 2023 New Zealand census, an increase of 840 people (40.0%) since the 2018 census, and an increase of 1,542 people (110.3%) since the 2013 census. There were 1,503 males, 1,425 females and 9 people of other genders in 1,167 dwellings. 2.1% of people identified as LGBTIQ+. The median age was 49.7 years (compared with 38.1 years nationally). There were 516 people (17.6%) aged under 15 years, 306 (10.4%) aged 15 to 29, 1,392 (47.3%) aged 30 to 64, and 726 (24.7%) aged 65 or older.

People could identify as more than one ethnicity. The results were 94.1% European (Pākehā); 12.3% Māori; 3.5% Pasifika; 2.3% Asian; 0.7% Middle Eastern, Latin American and African New Zealanders (MELAA); and 3.3% other, which includes people giving their ethnicity as "New Zealander". English was spoken by 98.1%, Māori language by 1.4%, and other languages by 6.7%. No language could be spoken by 1.6% (e.g. too young to talk). New Zealand Sign Language was known by 0.2%. The percentage of people born overseas was 19.9, compared with 28.8% nationally.

Religious affiliations were 23.4% Christian, 0.3% Hindu, 0.1% Islam, 0.2% Māori religious beliefs, 0.6% Buddhist, 0.5% New Age, 0.1% Jewish, and 0.7% other religions. People who answered that they had no religion were 66.8%, and 7.4% of people did not answer the census question.

Of those at least 15 years old, 426 (17.6%) people had a bachelor's or higher degree, 1,395 (57.5%) had a post-high school certificate or diploma, and 471 (19.4%) people exclusively held high school qualifications. The median income was $35,200, compared with $41,500 nationally. 282 people (11.6%) earned over $100,000 compared to 12.1% nationally. The employment status of those at least 15 was that 1,011 (41.7%) people were employed full-time, 468 (19.3%) were part-time, and 42 (1.7%) were unemployed.

== Education ==
Mangawhai Beach School is a coeducational full primary (years 1–8) school with a decile rating of 6 and a roll of 710 students as of July 2026.

Mangawhai Hills College is an independent private school that opened in February 2025 with 13 students in years 7 to 9. It will add a year level each year until it serves students from years 7 to 13 in 2030. It was established by the Mangawhai Education Trust.
