= Kaiwaka =

- The Eutopia cafe building
- Nickname: The little town of lights
- Interactive map of Kaiwaka
- Coordinates: 36°9′40″S 174°26′37″E
- Country: New Zealand
- Region: Northland Region
- District: Kaipara District
- Ward: Kaiwaka-Mangawhai Ward
- Electorates: Northland; Te Tai Tokerau

Government
  - Territorial Authority: Kaipara District Council
  - Regional council: Northland Regional Council
  - Mayor of Kaipara: Jonathan Larsen
  - Northland MP: Grant McCallum
  - Te Tai Tokerau MP: Mariameno Kapa-Kingi

Area
  - Total: 7.57 km^{2} (2.92 sq mi)

Population (June 2025)
  - Total: 820
  - Density: 110/km^{2} (280/sq mi)

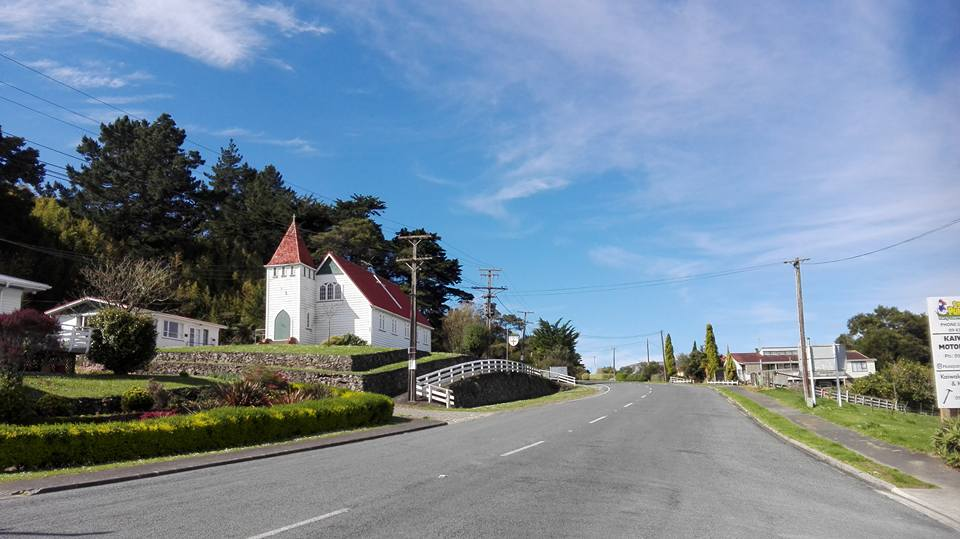
Looking east on Kaiwaka Mangawhai Road, with St Paul's Anglican church on the left

Kaiwaka, known as "the little town of lights", is a settlement in Northland, New Zealand. The Kaiwaka River runs from the east through the area and joins with the Wairau River to form the Otamatea River, which drains into the Kaipara Harbour. State Highway 1 passes through Kaiwaka. Kaiwaka is located 20 kilometres (12 mi) north of Wellsford.

Kaiwaka was established in the 1850s during the kauri timber and gum trade. During the late 19th and early 20th century both the road and railway line north passed through the town.

== Etymology ==
The New Zealand Ministry for Culture and Heritage gives a translation of eating the canoes for Kaiwaka. The reference to food and canoe may reflect the historic Mangapai portage route between Kaiwaka and Mangawhai linking the east coast with the Kaipara Harbour.

Local tradition also speaks of a cloud that is only observed in this part of the Kaipara. It is seen as an omen that a high-ranking person is about to die. Kaiwaka refers to threatening clouds on the horizon, and also to a sign of misfortune.

== History ==
=== Pre-European history ===
In February 1825, during the Musket Wars, a major battle between Ngāpuhi and Ngāti Whātua was fought at Te Ika-a-ranga-nui, near Kaiwaka.

=== European settlement ===
Kaiwaka became a trading and commercial point from the late 1850s. As the kauri timber and gum industries declined towards the end of the century, dairy farming became established. The Hakaru Dairy Company was formed to serve Kaiwaka farmers in 1902.

From the 1880s, steamers provided regular service to Kaiwaka from the Otamatea. The Minnie Casey ran a service every Tuesday from 1882. Services continued well into the 20th century.

The Great North Road from Auckland to Whangārei passed through Kaiwaka, but was only a line on a map for much of the 19th century. Attempts were made to improve the road from 1895, and by 1900 the worst places on the road between Kaiwaka and Whangārei were metalled. In 1911, Kaiwaka had a population of 211.

The North Auckland railway line reached Kaiwaka in March 1913, although problems with the terrain, and World War I, meant that it was not extended significantly further north until the early 1920s.

The Lands and Survey Department took over large blocks of unproductive land and developed them in the 1940s, and these were passed to returning soldiers in the early 1950s.

== Notable places ==
Eutopia cafe was established in 2001. The cafe is decorated with artwork, coloured glass, and sculptures and has a distinct appearance.

=== Marae ===
Kaiwaka's Te Pounga Marae and meeting house on the central peninsula of Kaipara Harbour are a traditional meeting place for Te Uri o Hau and Ngāti Whātua.

== Demographics ==
Statistics New Zealand describes Kaiwaka as a rural settlement, which covers 7.57 km^{2} (2.92 sq mi) and had an estimated population of 820 as of June 2025, with a population density of 108 people per km^{2}. Kaiwaka is part of the larger Kaiwaka statistical area.

Historical population for Kaiwaka settlement
Year	Pop.	±% p.a.
2006	525	—
2013	621	+2.43%
2018	744	+3.68%
2023	783	+1.03%
The 2006 population is for a smaller area of 7.23 km^{2}. Source:

Kaiwaka had a population of 783 in the 2023 New Zealand census, an increase of 39 people (5.2%) since the 2018 census, and an increase of 162 people (26.1%) since the 2013 census. There were 390 males, 393 females and 3 people of other genders in 285 dwellings. 1.9% of people identified as LGBTIQ+. The median age was 39.9 years (compared with 38.1 years nationally). There were 165 people (21.1%) aged under 15 years, 138 (17.6%) aged 15 to 29, 366 (46.7%) aged 30 to 64, and 114 (14.6%) aged 65 or older.

People could identify as more than one ethnicity. The results were 72.4% European (Pākehā); 28.4% Māori; 5.0% Pasifika; 12.3% Asian; 0.8% Middle Eastern, Latin American and African New Zealanders (MELAA); and 1.9% other, which includes people giving their ethnicity as "New Zealander". English was spoken by 97.3%, Māori language by 5.4%, and other languages by 11.9%. No language could be spoken by 1.5% (e.g. too young to talk). The percentage of people born overseas was 24.5, compared with 28.8% nationally.

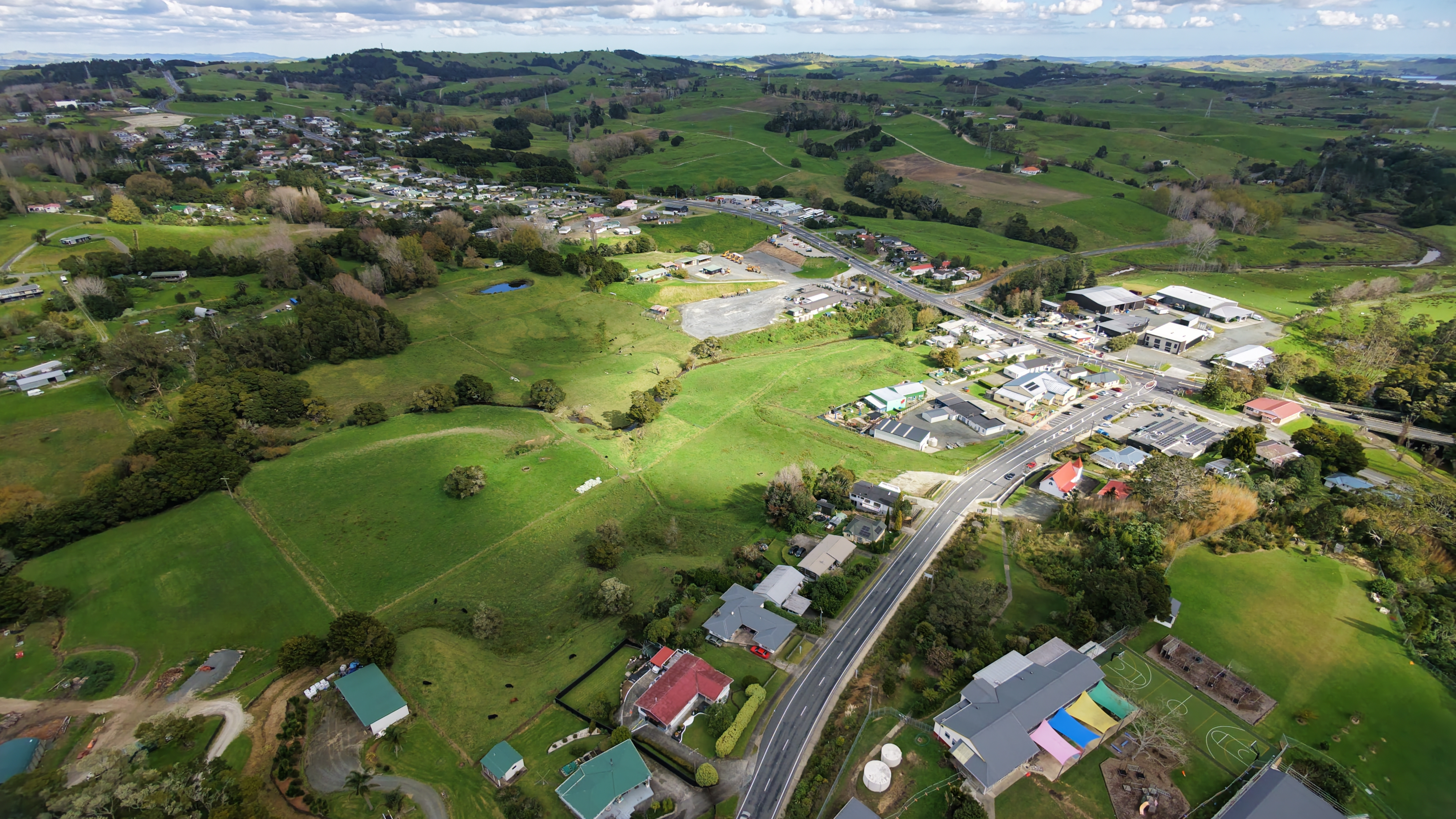
Kaiwaka from above, looking southwest

Religious affiliations were 32.2% Christian, 1.5% Hindu, 0.4% Islam, 3.8% Māori religious beliefs, 0.4% New Age, 0.4% Jewish, and 1.9% other religions. People who answered that they had no religion were 52.1%, and 6.5% of people did not answer the census question.

Of those at least 15 years old, 63 (10.2%) people had a bachelor's or higher degree, 333 (53.9%) had a post-high school certificate or diploma, and 186 (30.1%) people exclusively held high school qualifications. The median income was $33,400, compared with $41,500 nationally. 36 people (5.8%) earned over $100,000 compared to 12.1% nationally. The employment status of those at least 15 was that 300 (48.5%) people were employed full-time, 105 (17.0%) were part-time, and 12 (1.9%) were unemployed.

=== Kaiwaka statistical area ===
Kaiwaka statistical area covers 259.03 km^{2} (100.01 sq mi) and had an estimated population of 2,680 as of June 2025, with a population density of 10.3 people per km^{2}.

Historical population for Kaiwaka statistical area
Year	Pop.	±% p.a.
2006	1,452	—
2013	1,599	+1.39%
2018	2,139	+5.99%
2023	2,532	+3.43%

Kaiwaka had a population of 2,532 in the 2023 New Zealand census, an increase of 393 people (18.4%) since the 2018 census, and an increase of 933 people (58.3%) since the 2013 census. There were 1,263 males, 1,266 females and 6 people of other genders in 945 dwellings. 1.9% of people identified as LGBTIQ+. The median age was 43.6 years (compared with 38.1 years nationally). There were 477 people (18.8%) aged under 15 years, 354 (14.0%) aged 15 to 29, 1,245 (49.2%) aged 30 to 64, and 456 (18.0%) aged 65 or older.

People could identify as more than one ethnicity. The results were 79.6% European (Pākehā); 26.1% Māori; 4.9% Pasifika; 6.9% Asian; 0.8% Middle Eastern, Latin American and African New Zealanders (MELAA); and 3.2% other, which includes people giving their ethnicity as "New Zealander". English was spoken by 97.6%, Māori language by 6.4%, Samoan by 0.1%, and other languages by 9.5%. No language could be spoken by 1.8% (e.g. too young to talk). New Zealand Sign Language was known by 0.6%. The percentage of people born overseas was 20.4, compared with 28.8% nationally.

Religious affiliations were 26.9% Christian, 0.7% Hindu, 0.2% Islam, 4.5% Māori religious beliefs, 0.4% Buddhist, 1.2% New Age, 0.2% Jewish, and 1.7% other religions. People who answered that they had no religion were 57.1%, and 7.9% of people did not answer the census question.

Of those at least 15 years old, 276 (13.4%) people had a bachelor's or higher degree, 1,158 (56.4%) had a post-high school certificate or diploma, and 543 (26.4%) people exclusively held high school qualifications. The median income was $32,700, compared with $41,500 nationally. 153 people (7.4%) earned over $100,000 compared to 12.1% nationally. The employment status of those at least 15 was that 978 (47.6%) people were employed full-time, 318 (15.5%) were part-time, and 36 (1.8%) were unemployed.

== Notable people ==
- Jane Mander, journalist and novelist, attended school in Kaiwaka.
- Tāpihana Paraire Paikea, Member of Parliament for Northern Maori, died at Kaiwaka.

== Education ==
Kaiwaka School is a coeducational contributing primary (years 1–6) school with a roll of 133 students as of July 2026.

The school opened in September, 1871, and the school celebrated its centennial in 1970.

== Geographic features ==
=== Kaiwaka River ===
The Kaiwaka River is a prominent feature that begins near Kaiwaka township and flows West, where it joins the Wairau River to form the Otamatea River, which drains into the Kaipara Harbour.

=== Pukekaroro Scenic Reserve ===
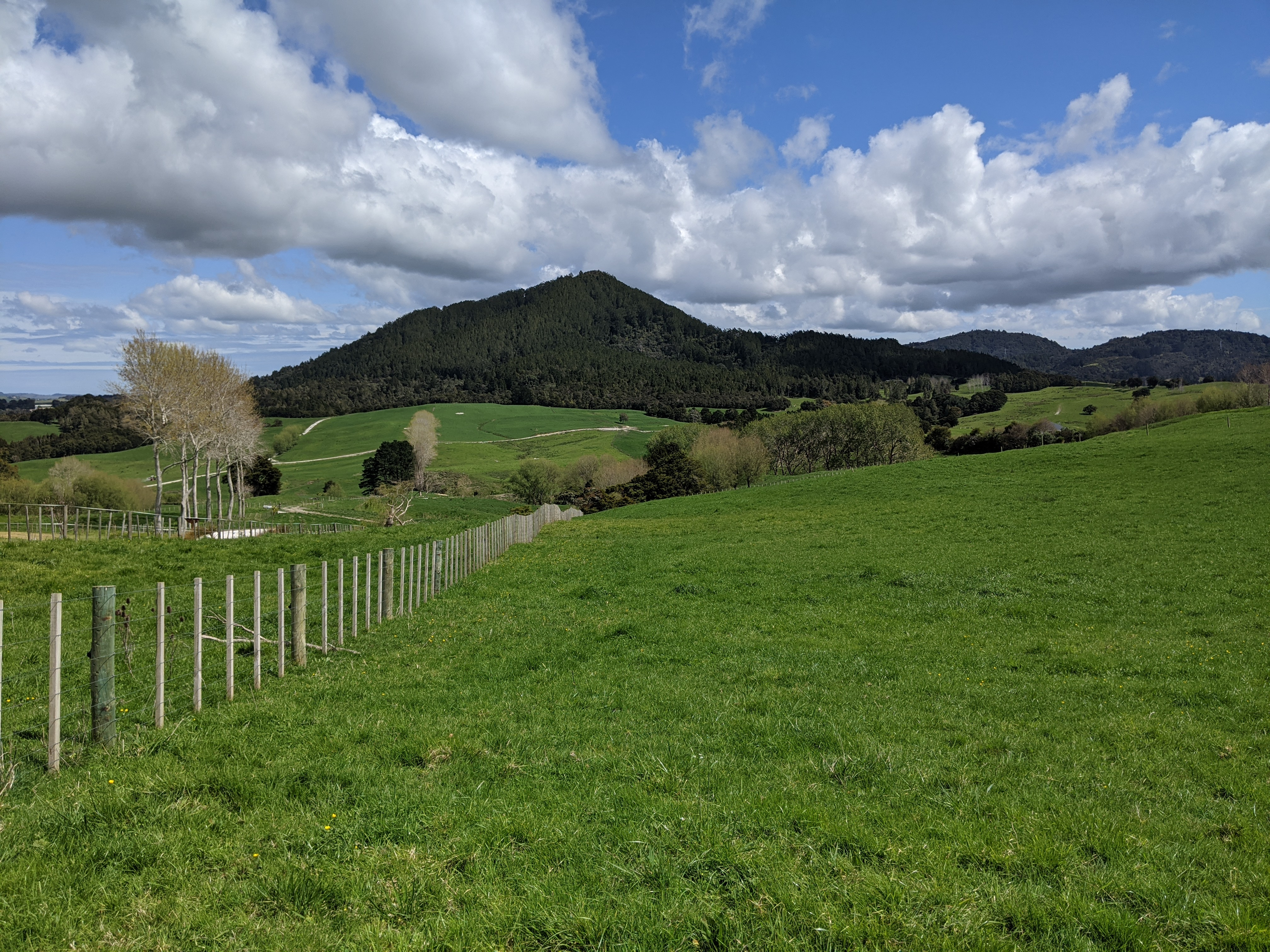
Pukekaroro

Pukekaroro is a distinctive 1.5-kilometre-diameter (0.93 mi), forest-covered volcanic dome of dacite dated at 17 million years old rising to a height of 301 metres (988 ft), 3.5 kilometres (2.2 mi) north of Kaiwaka on State Highway 1.

The maunga (mountain) Pukekaroro is of great importance to Te Uri o Hau. Pukekaroro was a key strategic site for Te Uri o Hau, as from the summit the Mangawhai Heads to the east and the Kaipara Harbour entrance to the west are both visible. Traditionally, Te Uri o Hau used the timber that grew on the mountain to build waka renowned for their seaworthiness.

During the battle known as Te Ika Ranganui in 1825, Karoro, a rangatira (chief) who had a pā (settlement) site at the very top of the mountain, retrieved many Te Uri o Hau dead and wounded from the surrounding area and carried them up to the pā so they would not be found by the enemy. Pukekaroro is of special spiritual significance to Te Uri o Hau because of the many wāhi tapu (sacred sites) on the mountain. The mountain has been tapu (sacred) since that battle and remains so today.

== See also ==
- Te Whareumu#Te Ika-a-ranga-nui
