= Kaiwaka River =

River in New Zealand

Coordinates: 36°09′S 174°24′E

Location
- Country: New Zealand

Physical characteristics
- Length: 10 km (6.2 mi)

The Kaiwaka River is a river of New Zealand's Northland Region. For much of its length, it is a broad arm of the Otamatea River, as much an inlet of the Kaipara Harbour as a true river.

== See also ==
- List of rivers of New Zealand
