= Tinopai =

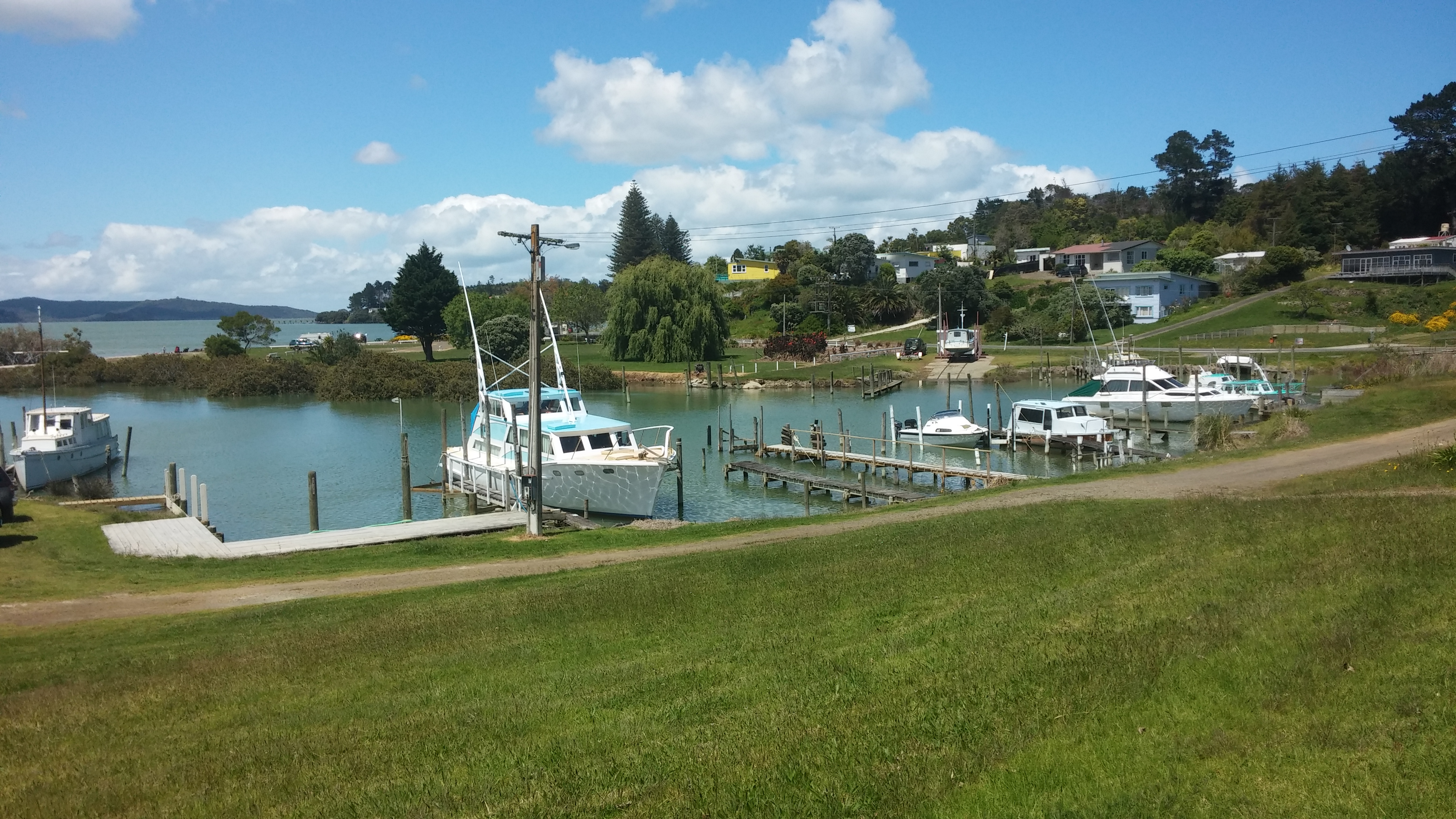
- Tinopai marina
- Interactive map of Tinopai
- Coordinates: 36°15′18″S 174°14′55″E
- Country: New Zealand
- Region: Northland Region
- District: Kaipara District
- Ward: Otamatea Ward
- Electorates: Northland; Te Tai Tokerau

Government
  - Territorial Authority: Kaipara District Council
  - Regional council: Northland Regional Council
  - Mayor of Kaipara: Jonathan Larsen
  - Northland MP: Grant McCallum
  - Te Tai Tokerau MP: Mariameno Kapa-Kingi

Area
  - Total: 23.21 km^{2} (8.96 sq mi)

Population (2023 Census)
  - Total: 240
  - Density: 10/km^{2} (27/sq mi)

Tinopai is a settlement on the Komiti Bay, part of the Hukatere Peninsula in the northern Kaipara Harbour in Northland, New Zealand. The Otamatea River flows from the north east past Tinopai and into the harbour. Matakohe is 23 km (14 mi) to the north.

It is now a quiet backwater. The population is approximately 240, but expands considerably during the summer holiday season.

The Hukatere Scenic Reserve is on the road to Matakohe and contains a bush walk with mature kauri trees, to the north of Tinopai.

== History and culture ==
The original settlement was called Te Komiti, which was a regular stopping point for Māori travellers on the Kaipara. A large raupo church, capable of holding several hundred people, was built here in 1852. The Komiti Fruitlands Development Association bought 3,255 acres (13.17 km^{2}) in 1915 to grow fruit, particularly apples, and built a wharf in 1917 from which to ship them. They renamed the area "Tinopai Fruitlands" in 1918. Apple growing finished in the mid-1930s due to the Great Depression and poor management.

There are several marae in the Tinopai area. Ngā Tai Whakarongorua Marae and its Ngā Tai Whakarongorua meeting house, and Waihaua / Arapaoa Marae and its Kirihipi meeting house are connected with Te Uri o Hau and Ngāti Whātua. Rāwhitiroa Marae and its Rāwhitiroa meeting house are a meeting place for Te Uri o Hau and the Ngāti Whātua hapū of Te Popoto. The Waiōhou and Waiotea / Tinopai marae grounds are also meeting places for both iwi.

== Demographics ==
Tinopai is in an SA1 statistical area which covers 23.21 km^{2} (8.96 sq mi). The SA1 area is part of the larger Rūāwai-Matakohe statistical area.

Historical population for Tinopai and surrounds
Year	Pop.	±% p.a.
2006	189	—
2013	174	−1.17%
2018	210	+3.83%
2023	240	+2.71%

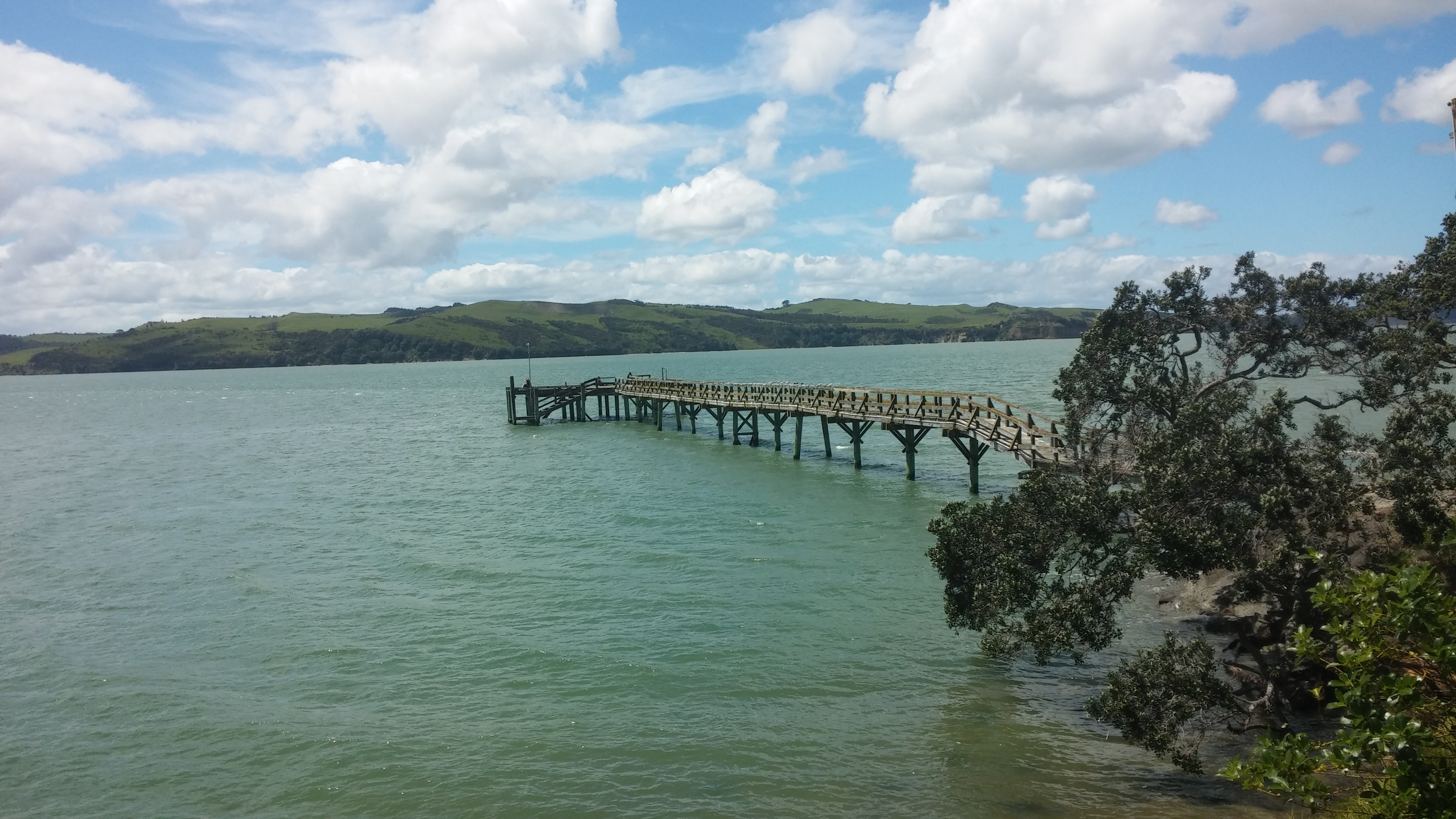
Tinopai wharf, opened 1991 by MP Lockwood Smith

The SA1 statistical area had a population of 240 in the 2023 New Zealand census, an increase of 30 people (14.3%) since the 2018 census, and an increase of 66 people (37.9%) since the 2013 census. There were 126 males and 111 females in 99 dwellings. The median age was 57.1 years (compared with 38.1 years nationally). There were 42 people (17.5%) aged under 15 years, 18 (7.5%) aged 15 to 29, 102 (42.5%) aged 30 to 64, and 78 (32.5%) aged 65 or older.

People could identify as more than one ethnicity. The results were 71.2% European (Pākehā), 50.0% Māori, 2.5% Pasifika, 2.5% Asian, and 2.5% other, which includes people giving their ethnicity as "New Zealander". English was spoken by 96.2%, Māori language by 10.0%, and other languages by 2.5%. No language could be spoken by 1.2% (e.g. too young to talk). The percentage of people born overseas was 7.5, compared with 28.8% nationally.

Religious affiliations were 31.2% Christian, 1.2% Islam, 5.0% Māori religious beliefs, 1.2% New Age, and 1.2% other religions. People who answered that they had no religion were 57.5%, and 5.0% of people did not answer the census question.

Of those at least 15 years old, 21 (10.6%) people had a bachelor's or higher degree, 102 (51.5%) had a post-high school certificate or diploma, and 69 (34.8%) people exclusively held high school qualifications. The median income was $22,800, compared with $41,500 nationally. 6 people (3.0%) earned over $100,000 compared to 12.1% nationally. The employment status of those at least 15 was that 54 (27.3%) people were employed full-time, 15 (7.6%) were part-time, and 9 (4.5%) were unemployed.

== Education ==
Tinopai School is a coeducational full primary (years 1-8) school with a roll of 19 students as of July 2026. The school opened on 13 September 1916.
