= Ruawai =

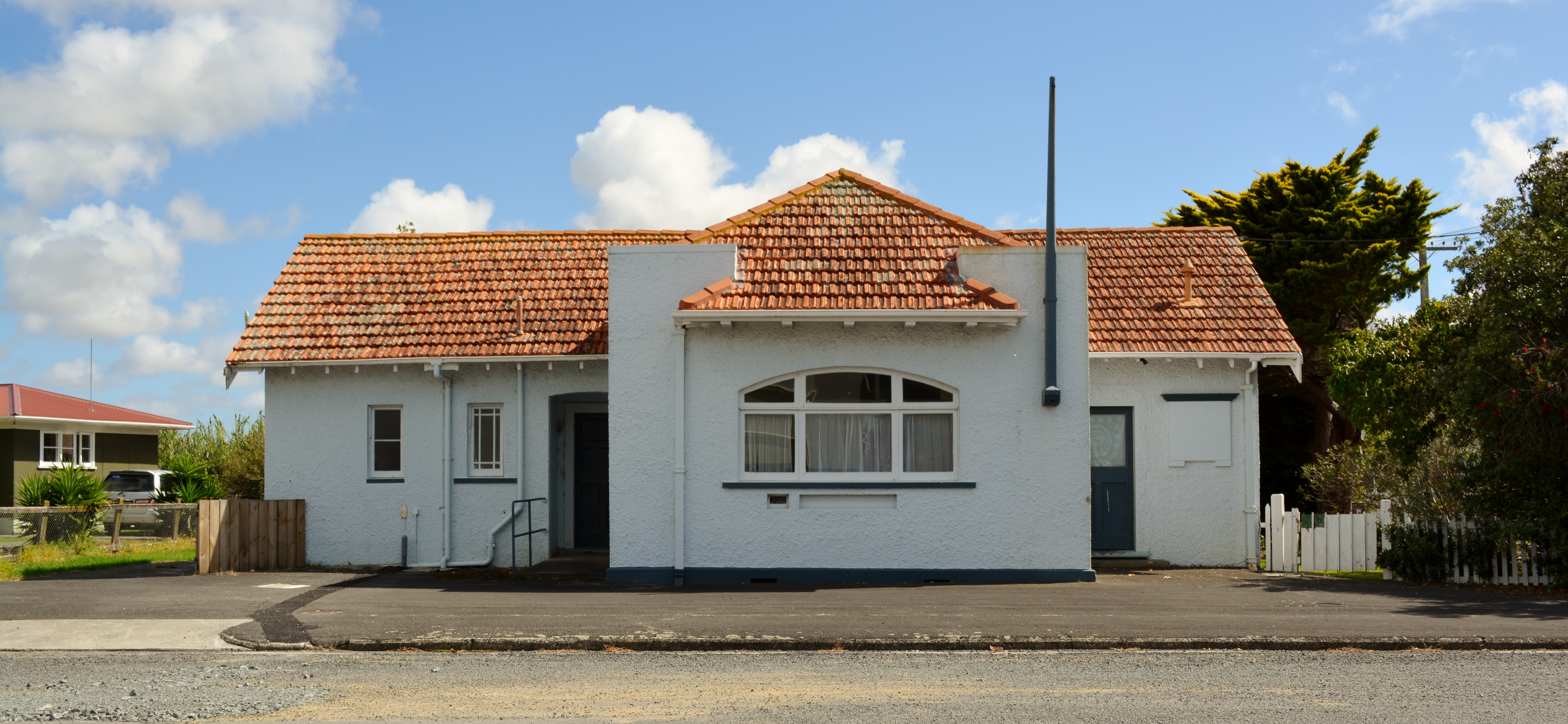
- Former Ruawai Post Office and telephone exchange
- Interactive map of Ruawai
- Coordinates: 36°8′11″S 174°1′26″E
- Country: New Zealand
- Region: Northland Region
- District: Kaipara District
- Ward: Otamatea Ward
- Electorates: Northland; Te Tai Tokerau

Government
  - Territorial Authority: Kaipara District Council
  - Regional council: Northland Regional Council
  - Mayor of Kaipara: Jonathan Larsen
  - Northland MP: Grant McCallum
  - Te Tai Tokerau MP: Mariameno Kapa-Kingi

Area
  - Total: 3.21 km^{2} (1.24 sq mi)

Population (June 2025)
  - Total: 480
  - Density: 150/km^{2} (390/sq mi)

Ruawai is a small town located 30 km south of Dargaville in Northland, New Zealand.

The name literally translated from Maori means 'two waters' referring to the nearby Northern Wairoa River and Kaipara Harbour. The township primarily serves the outlying farming area which consists mainly of cattle farming and kumara growing and the town declared itself as the Kumara capital of the world.

The local Naumai Marae and Ngā Uri o te Kotahitanga meeting house is a traditional meeting place for Ngāti Whātua and Te Uri o Hau.

== History ==
Ruawai was a location for the late 19th/early 20th century kauri gum digging trade. The farmer Doug Righton had a wing design patented in 1931 and during the 1950s and 1960s, he built a large glider, the Righton Big Wing, based on that patent.

== Economy ==
The Ruawai flats produce a large amount of sweet potato.

== Demographics ==
Statistics New Zealand describes Rūāwai as a rural settlement, which covers 3.21 km^{2} (1.24 sq mi) and had an estimated population of 480 as of June 2025, with a population density of 150 people per km^{2}. Rūāwai is part of the larger Rūāwai-Matakohe statistical area.

Historical population for Rūāwai settlement
Year	Pop.	±% p.a.
2006	426	—
2013	432	+0.20%
2018	471	+1.74%
2023	480	+0.38%

Rūāwai had a population of 480 in the 2023 New Zealand census, an increase of 9 people (1.9%) since the 2018 census, and an increase of 48 people (11.1%) since the 2013 census. There were 246 males and 234 females in 198 dwellings. 1.9% of people identified as LGBTIQ+. The median age was 48.6 years (compared with 38.1 years nationally). There were 93 people (19.4%) aged under 15 years, 63 (13.1%) aged 15 to 29, 180 (37.5%) aged 30 to 64, and 144 (30.0%) aged 65 or older.

People could identify as more than one ethnicity. The results were 78.1% European (Pākehā); 41.2% Māori; 3.8% Pasifika; 2.5% Asian; and 0.6% Middle Eastern, Latin American and African New Zealanders (MELAA). English was spoken by 98.1%, Māori language by 5.0%, Samoan by 0.6%, and other languages by 2.5%. No language could be spoken by 1.2% (e.g. too young to talk). The percentage of people born overseas was 10.6, compared with 28.8% nationally.

Religious affiliations were 36.2% Christian, 2.5% Māori religious beliefs, 0.6% New Age, and 0.6% other religions. People who answered that they had no religion were 49.4%, and 11.2% of people did not answer the census question.

Of those at least 15 years old, 24 (6.2%) people had a bachelor's or higher degree, 198 (51.2%) had a post-high school certificate or diploma, and 156 (40.3%) people exclusively held high school qualifications. The median income was $26,800, compared with $41,500 nationally. 9 people (2.3%) earned over $100,000 compared to 12.1% nationally. The employment status of those at least 15 was that 123 (31.8%) people were employed full-time, 60 (15.5%) were part-time, and 21 (5.4%) were unemployed.

=== Rūāwai-Matakohe statistical area ===
Rūāwai-Matakohe statistical area, which also includes Matakohe and Tinopai, covers 530.47 km^{2} (204.82 sq mi) and had an estimated population of 2,720 as of June 2025, with a population density of 5.1 people per km^{2}.

Historical population for Rūāwai-Matakohe
Year	Pop.	±% p.a.
2006	2,235	—
2013	2,289	+0.34%
2018	2,436	+1.25%
2023	2,631	+1.55%

Rūāwai-Matakohe had a population of 2,631 in the 2023 New Zealand census, an increase of 195 people (8.0%) since the 2018 census, and an increase of 342 people (14.9%) since the 2013 census. There were 1,380 males, 1,248 females and 3 people of other genders in 1,044 dwellings. 2.2% of people identified as LGBTIQ+. The median age was 48.6 years (compared with 38.1 years nationally). There were 498 people (18.9%) aged under 15 years, 321 (12.2%) aged 15 to 29, 1,194 (45.4%) aged 30 to 64, and 621 (23.6%) aged 65 or older.

People could identify as more than one ethnicity. The results were 83.9% European (Pākehā); 28.6% Māori; 4.1% Pasifika; 2.4% Asian; 0.5% Middle Eastern, Latin American and African New Zealanders (MELAA); and 3.9% other, which includes people giving their ethnicity as "New Zealander". English was spoken by 97.9%, Māori language by 4.8%, Samoan by 0.3%, and other languages by 4.4%. No language could be spoken by 1.6% (e.g. too young to talk). New Zealand Sign Language was known by 0.2%. The percentage of people born overseas was 11.4, compared with 28.8% nationally.

Religious affiliations were 26.7% Christian, 0.5% Hindu, 0.1% Islam, 3.0% Māori religious beliefs, 0.1% Buddhist, 0.7% New Age, and 1.0% other religions. People who answered that they had no religion were 58.5%, and 9.7% of people did not answer the census question.

Of those at least 15 years old, 177 (8.3%) people had a bachelor's or higher degree, 1,194 (56.0%) had a post-high school certificate or diploma, and 702 (32.9%) people exclusively held high school qualifications. The median income was $30,300, compared with $41,500 nationally. 126 people (5.9%) earned over $100,000 compared to 12.1% nationally. The employment status of those at least 15 was that 885 (41.5%) people were employed full-time, 351 (16.5%) were part-time, and 75 (3.5%) were unemployed.

== Education ==
Ruawai College is a secondary (years 7–13) school with a roll of 145 students as of July 2026. Ruawai District High School was established in 1929. In December 1995, Ruawai College installed a 128 kbit/s DDS leased line connection that delivered internet services and offered dialup internet with IGRIN billing the service (IGRIN has since purchased by Orcon). The arrangement delivered internet to the rural community where the nearest dialup internet services were a toll call away, as well as giving the school low cost internet. At the time, only a handful of schools nationally had a campus-wide, hard wired internet service.

Ruawai School is a contributing primary (years 1–6) school with a roll of 96 students as of July 2026.

Both schools are coeducational.

== Notable people ==
- Lockwood Smith, politician.
- Roy Billing OAM, noted NZ actor, now domiciled in Australia, was brought up in Ruawai where he attended Ruawai High School
- Grace Gooder – New Zealand cricketer (1924–1983)
