= Te Uri-o-Hau =

Māori hapū (sub-tribe) of the iwi (tribe) Ngāti Whātua in Aotearoa New Zealand

- Iwi (tribe) in Māoridom
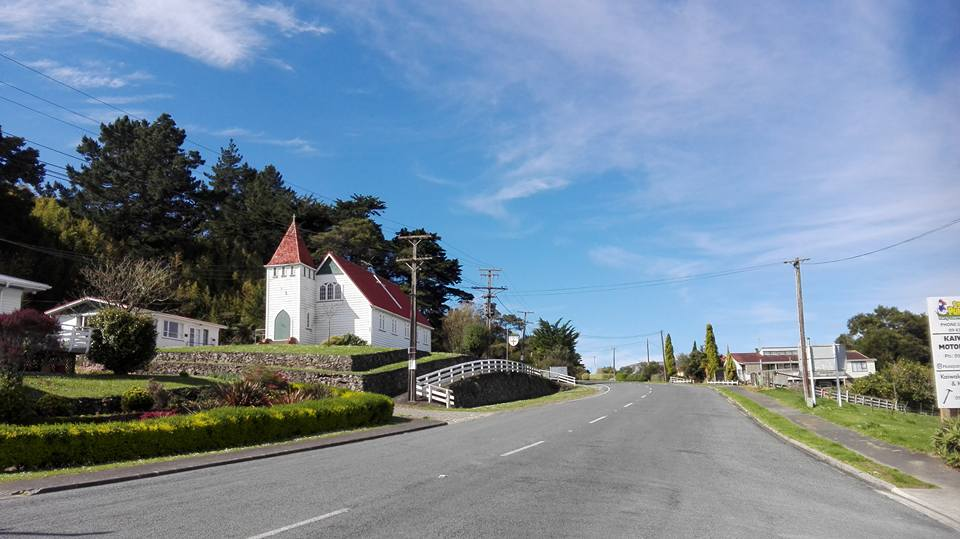
- Kaiwaka

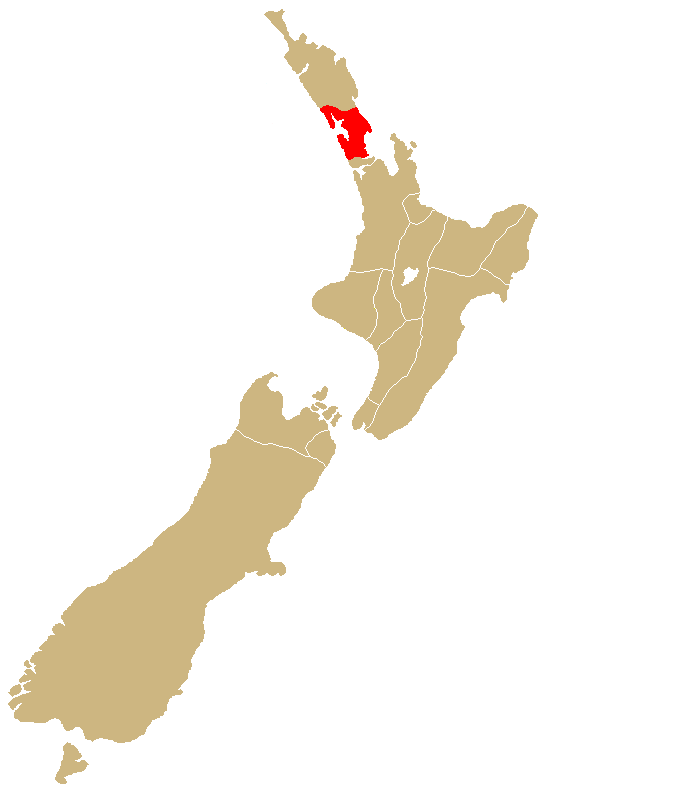
- Rohe (region): Northland
- Waka (canoe): Māhuhu-ki-te-rangi
- Population: 1,314 (2018 census)
- Website: www.uriohau.com

Te Uri-o-Hau (sometimes spelt Te Uri O Hau or Te Uriohau) is a Māori iwi (tribe) based around New Zealand's Kaipara Harbour. It is both an independent iwi and a hapū (sub-tribe) of the larger Ngāti Whātua iwi, alongside Ngāti Whātua-o-Ōrākei, Te Roroa and Te Taoū. Its rohe (tribal area) includes Dargaville, Maungaturoto, Mangawhai, Kaiwaka and Wellsford.

According to the 2018 New Zealand census, about 1,314 people affiliate with the iwi. This compares to 732 in 2001, 1,074 in 2006, and 1,260 in 2013.

== History ==
Iwi leader Russell Kemp died in 2018 at the age of 71.

== Hapū and marae ==
=== Hapū ===
Te Uri-o-Hau is further divided into the following hapū (sub-tribes):

- Ngāi Tāhuhu
- Ngāti Kaiwhare
- Ngāti Kauae
- Ngāti Kura
- Ngāti Mauku
- Ngāti Rangi
- Ngāti Tāhinga
- Te Uri o Hau

=== Marae and wharenui ===
The iwi has the following marae (meeting places) and wharenui (meeting houses):

- Naumai, Ngā Uri o te Kotahitanga, Ruawai
- Ngā Tai Whakarongorua and Ngā Tai Whakarongorua, Tinopai
- Ōruawharo and Rangimārie, Ōruawharo
- Ōtamatea and Aotearoa, Whakapirau
- Ōtūrei and Rangimārie Te Aroha, Aratapu
- Parirau and Te Whare Mārama, Matakohe
- Rāwhitiroa and Rāwhitiroa, Tinopai
- Rīpia and Te Orikena, Rīpia
- Te Kōwhai and Te Kōwhai, Matakohe
- Te Pounga and Te Pounga, Kaiwaka
- Waihaua Arapaoa and Kirihipi, Tinopai
- Waikāretu Pōuto and Waikāretu, Te Kōpuru
- Waiōhou, Tinopai
- Waiotea, Tinopai

== Organisations ==
Te Uri o Hau Settlement Trust represents the iwi following its Treaty of Waitangi settlement with the New Zealand Government under Te Uri o Hau Claims Settlement Act 2002. It also represents the iwi as an "iwi authority" during the resource consent process under the Resource Management Act 1991. It is a Tūhono organisation and a trust, and its governance board includes two represents from each of the four Ngā Mātua marae: Otamatea, Waikaretu, Oruawharo and Arapaoa.

The iwi has interests in the territory of Northland Regional Council, Auckland Council and Kaipara District Council.

== Religion ==
According to the 2018 New Zealand census, 53.6% of the iwi has a religious belief and 40% have no religious beliefs. By comparison, 38.1% for the Māori population as a whole has a religious belief.

Religious affiliation	%
Irreligious	40
Christianity	32.1
Anglicanism	8.2
Catholicism	7.5
Christianity (no further description)	5.7
Latter-Day Saints	2.7
Methodism	2.3
Pentecostal	2.1
Presbyterian, Congregational and Reformed	1.8
Evangelical, Born-Again and Fundamentalist	1.1
Jehovah's Witnesses	0.7
Māori Religions	20.3
Rātana Church	19.6
Other Māori religions and beliefs	0.7
Spiritualism and New Age Religions	1.8
Object to answering	6.4

== Notable people ==
- Paraire Karaka Paikea
- Hone Tuwhare

== See also ==
- List of Māori iwi
