= Kaipara District =

- Territorial authority district
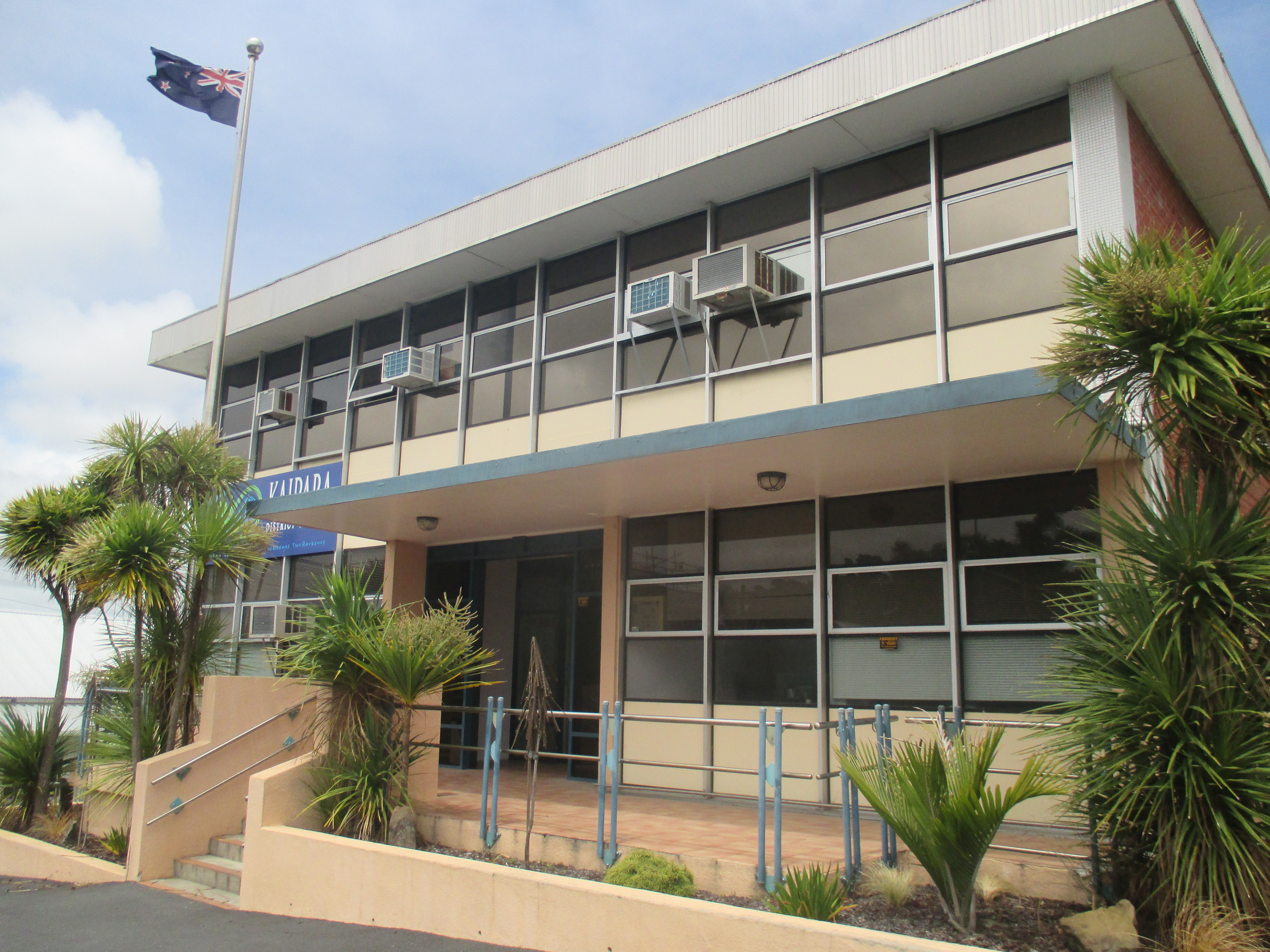
- Kaipara District Council building in Dargaville

- Kaipara district within the North Island
- Coordinates: 36.06°S 174.09°E
- Country: New Zealand
- Region: Northland
- Wards: Wairoa; Otamatea; Kaiwaka-Mangawhai
- Seat: Dargaville

Government
  - Mayor: Jonathan Larsen
  - Territorial authority: Kaipara District Council

Area
  - Land: 3,109.09 km^{2} (1,200.43 sq mi)

Population (June 2025)
  - Total: 26,800
  - Density: 8.62/km^{2} (22.3/sq mi)
- Time zone: UTC+12 (NZST)
  - Summer (DST): UTC+13 (NZDT)
- Postcode(s): Map of postcodes
- Website: Kaipara District Council

Kaipara District is a territorial authority district governed by Kaipara District Council in the Northland Region of New Zealand. It has a population of 26,800 (June 2025).

== Geography ==
Kaipara District covers 3,109.09 km^{2} (1,200.43 sq mi). It mostly lies on the western side of the Northland Peninsula, but the southern portion extends to a short part of the east coast in the Mangawhai area. Much of the district is in the rolling hills around the northern half of the Kaipara Harbour, a large natural harbour that opens to the Tasman Sea. Management of the harbour is shared between Kaipara District Council and other organisations, most notably Northland Regional Council (in the north) and Auckland Council to the south.

The roughly triangular district stretches from a narrow part of the Northland Peninsula south of Kaiwaka and Mangawhai in the southeast to the Waipoua Forest in the northwest. The district's western boundary is defined by Ripirō Beach, which stretches down the west coast from Maunganui Bluff and the Waipoua Forest in the north, to Pouto at the entrance to Kaipara Harbour. The region is bisected by the northern Wairoa River and its tributaries, which flow into the northern end of Kaipara Harbour.

=== Population centres ===
Most of the population of 26,800 (June 2025) live rurally, with the rest in small settlements scattered amongst the rolling hills or nestled on the shores of the harbour. Dargaville, in the west, is the largest town, the primary service centre and seat of the district council, with 5,170 residents. The rapidly growing twin towns of Mangawhai and Mangawhai Heads in the east have a combined population over 4,000 (Mangawhai Heads 2,760 and Mangawhai 1,290). Other towns and villages include Ruawai, Matakohe, Paparoa, Maungaturoto, Kaiwaka, Te Kōpuru, Kaihu and the harbour villages of Pahi, Tinopai and Whakapirau. The district has no major urban centre; the nearest one is the city of Whangārei, 45 kilometres northeast of Dargaville.

The area around Dargaville is noted for the high proportion of residents of Dalmatian descent and has an active Dalmatian Club. Community spirit is strong in the rural communities, as evidenced by the numerous local clubs, volunteer organisations and other initiatives. Dargaville has an annual Arts and Crafts Festival run by the local Rotary club and also features weekly Riverside Produce Markets on Thursday afternoons. Maungaturoto has a monthly market on a Friday from 4pm to 7pm at the Maungaturoto Hall and also has a volunteer group (Maungaturoto Residents Association) dedicated to beautifying the town. A similar volunteer group exists in Ruawai and Paparoa (Progressive Paparoa).

== Local government ==
Kaipara District was formed in the 1989 New Zealand local government reforms and was constituted on 1 November 1989. It was made up of five former boroughs and counties: all of Hobson County, Dargaville Borough, Otamatea County, and parts of Rodney County and Whangarei County.

Kaipara District Council faced financial management and governance challenges in 2012 that were beyond the ability of the mayor and councillors to manage, and they agreed to the Minister of Local Government appointing commissioners to take over governance. A new council was elected in 2016, with a Crown manager to guide it. The council returned to full self-management in 2019.

Prior to 2022, Kaipara District was divided into four wards: West Coast-Central, Dargaville, Otamatea, and Kaiwaka-Mangawhai. It has reverted to three wards (which is the last amount since the 2016 elections) from 2022. This time West Coast-Central and Dargaville Wards were merged to form Wairoa Ward.

== Demographics ==
Kaipara District had an estimated population of 26,800 as of June 2025, with a population density of 8.6 people per km^{2}.

Historical population
Year	Pop.	±% p.a.
18,135	2,013	—
2013	18,963	+0.01%
2018	22,869	+3.82%
2023	25,899	+2.52%

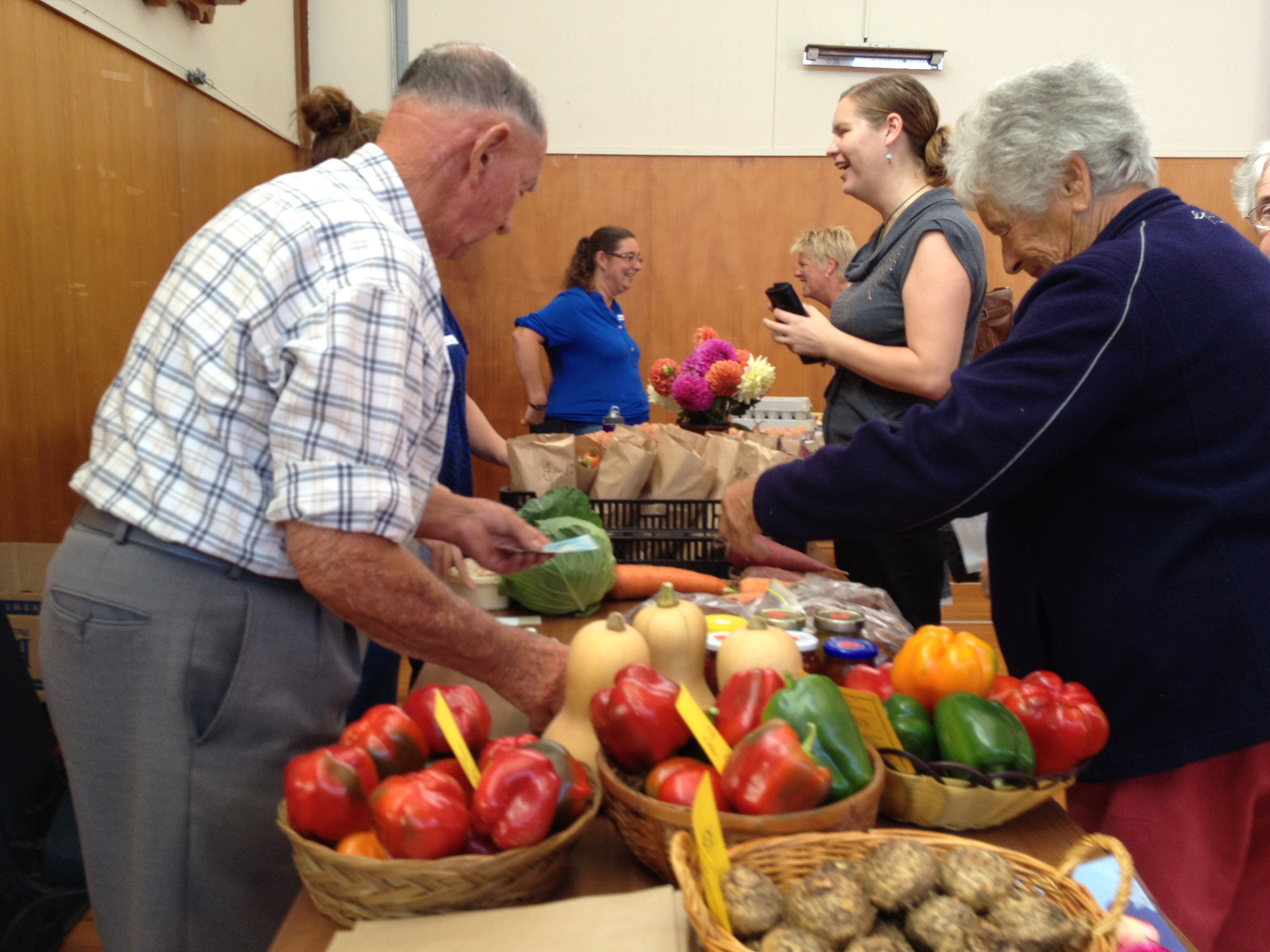
Maungaturoto Markets are held on the first Friday of the month.

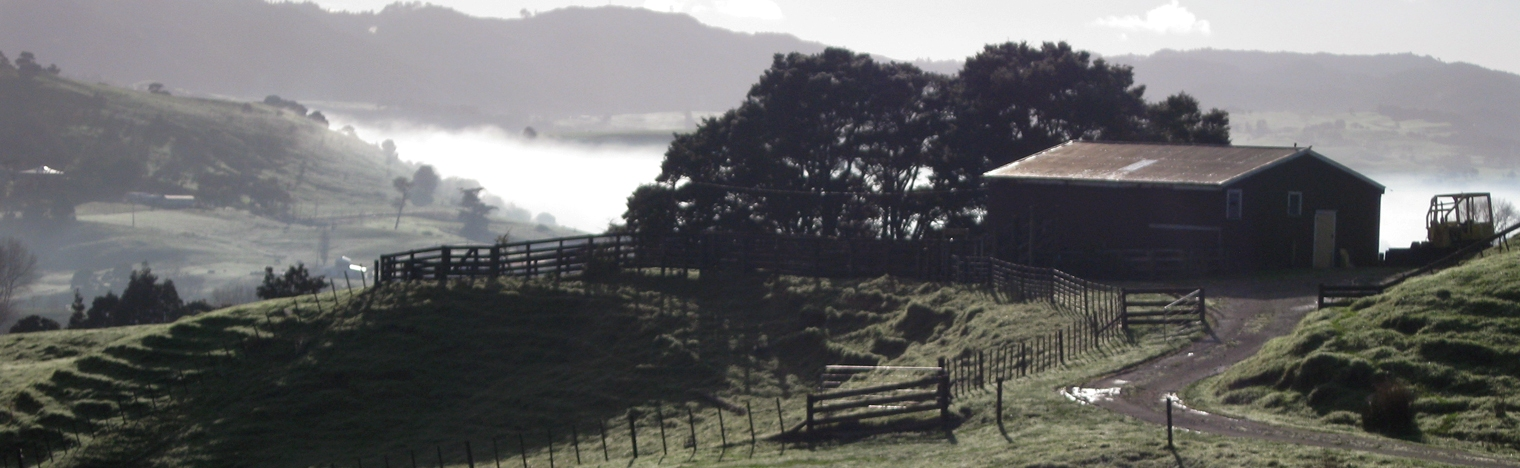
Photo taken from View Road, Maungaturoto

Kaipara District had a population of 25,899 in the 2023 New Zealand census, an increase of 3,030 people (13.2%) since the 2018 census, and an increase of 6,936 people (36.6%) since the 2013 census. There were 12,960 males, 12,849 females and 84 people of other genders in 10,191 dwellings. 2.2% of people identified as LGBTIQ+. The median age was 46.8 years (compared with 38.1 years nationally). There were 4,734 people (18.3%) aged under 15 years, 3,480 (13.4%) aged 15 to 29, 11,376 (43.9%) aged 30 to 64, and 6,309 (24.4%) aged 65 or older.

People could identify as more than one ethnicity. The results were 83.7% European (Pākehā); 25.4% Māori; 4.8% Pasifika; 3.6% Asian; 0.5% Middle Eastern, Latin American and African New Zealanders (MELAA); and 3.0% other, which includes people giving their ethnicity as "New Zealander". English was spoken by 97.7%, Māori language by 4.7%, Samoan by 0.3% and other languages by 6.3%. No language could be spoken by 1.7% (e.g. too young to talk). New Zealand Sign Language was known by 0.4%. The percentage of people born overseas was 15.7, compared with 28.8% nationally.

Religious affiliations were 30.5% Christian, 0.5% Hindu, 0.2% Islam, 2.3% Māori religious beliefs, 0.4% Buddhist, 0.6% New Age, 0.1% Jewish, and 1.1% other religions. People who answered that they had no religion were 56.0%, and 8.5% of people did not answer the census question.

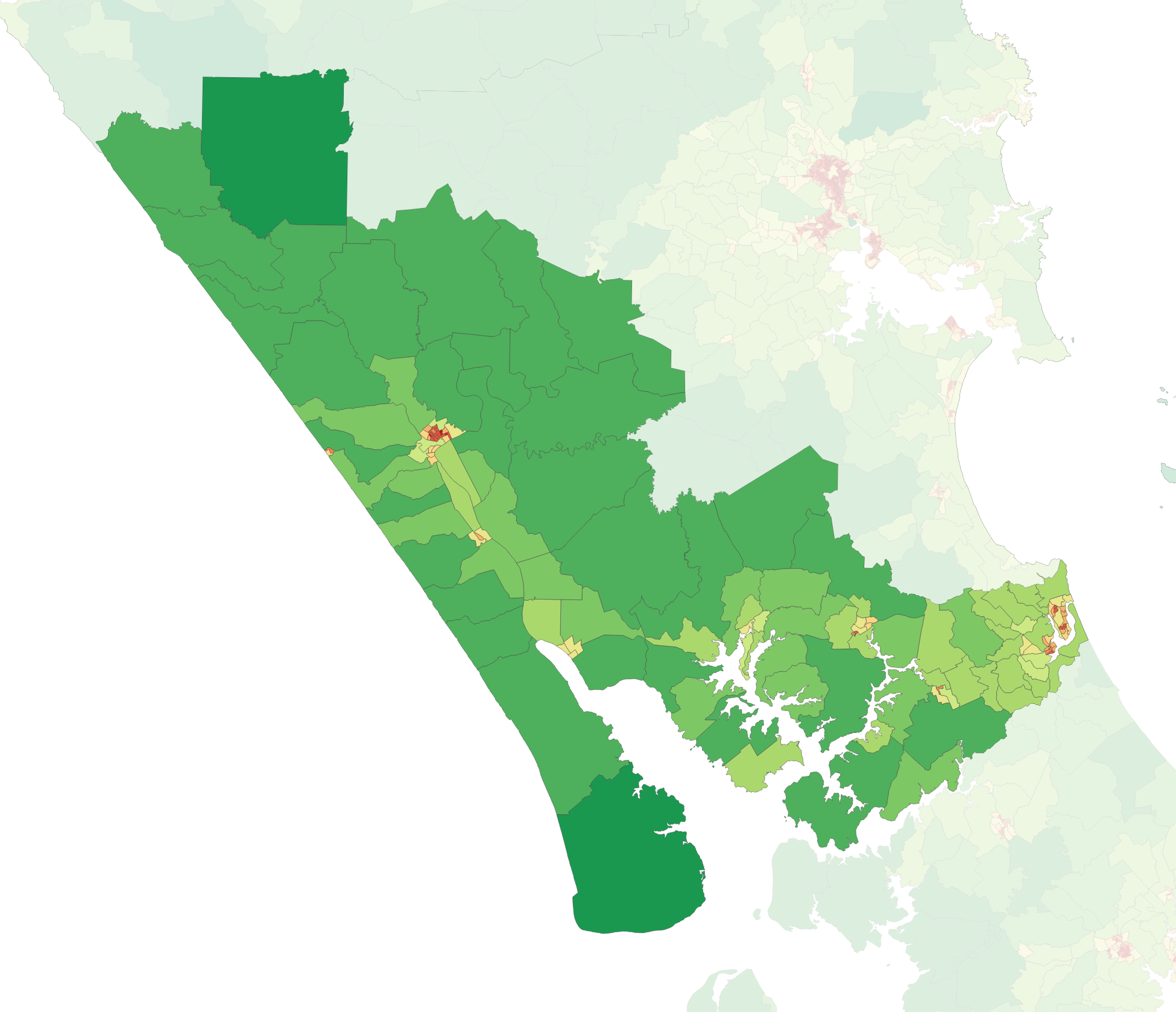
Population density in the 2023 census

Of those at least 15 years old, 2,391 (11.3%) people had a bachelor's or higher degree, 12,051 (56.9%) had a post-high school certificate or diploma, and 6,009 (28.4%) people exclusively held high school qualifications. The median income was $31,600, compared with $41,500 nationally. 1,557 people (7.4%) earned over $100,000 compared to 12.1% nationally. The employment status of those at least 15 was that 8,946 (42.3%) people were employed full-time, 3,240 (15.3%) were part-time, and 546 (2.6%) were unemployed.

Individual wards
Name	Area (km^{2})	Population	Density (per km^{2})	Dwellings	Median age	Median income
Wairoa General Ward	1,952.70	10,695	5.5	4,176	44.8 years	$30,200
Otamatea General Ward	796.92	5,835	7.3	2,274	47.0 years	$31,000
Kaiwaka-Mangawhai General Ward	359.47	9,369	26.1	3,741	48.5 years	$34,000
New Zealand					38.1 years	$41,500
