= Rodney County =

Coordinates: 36.585°S 174.695°E

- County of New Zealand
- 1876–1989
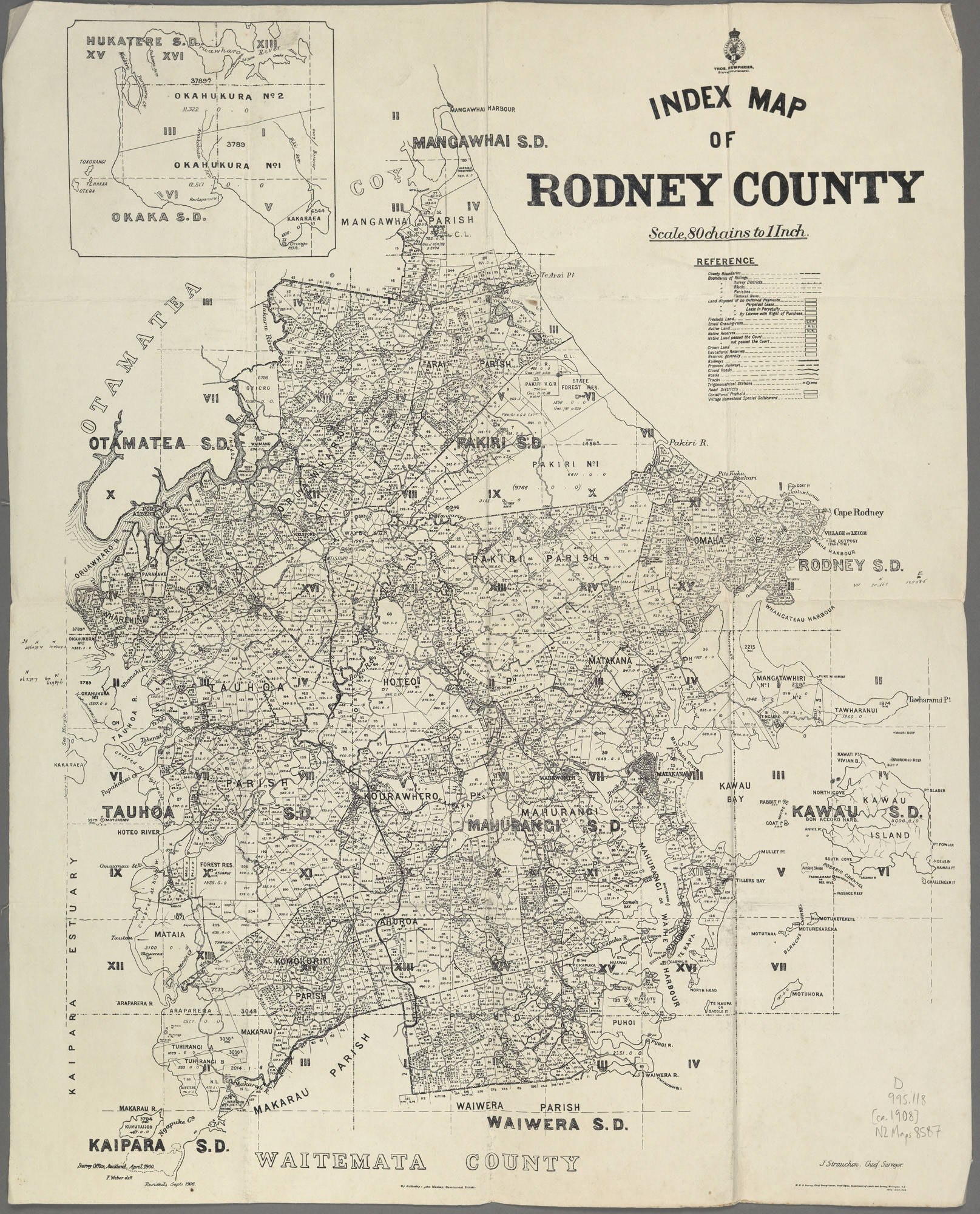
- 1908 map of Rodney County, excluding the Okahukura Peninsula
- Capital: Warkworth, Orewa (after amalgamation with Waitemata ridings)
- Population
  - 1970: 7,320
- History
  - Established: 1876
  - Disestablished: 1989
- Today part of: Auckland Council

Rodney County was one of the counties of New Zealand in the North Island, from 1876 until 1989. It came into existence in November 1876, when the provinces were abolished. In the 1989 local government reforms, it merged with Helensville Borough to create Rodney District.

== Geography ==
In 1970 Rodney County covered an area of 310,400 acres (125,600 ha).

The southern boundary with Waitemata County was along the Makarau River, whilst the northern boundary with Otamatea County was along the Hakaru River.

== History ==
In 1877 the Kaukapakapa Highway District was transferred from Rodney to Waitemata County. In 1883 the Wainui Road District was transferred to Waitemata County. The northern part of Rodney County (Mangawai and Whakapirau road districts) was transferred to the nascent Otamatea County in 1887.

Following the Counties Act 1949 Rodney County established two county towns: Wellsford in 1953 and Leigh in 1954.

In 1961 the Rodney County Council moved from their Alnwick Street address to a new building on Baxter Street, Warkworth.

In 1974, after absorbing the four rural ridings of Waitemata County the County would double the size and triple its population. Following this amalgamation it was decided to build a new council building in Orewa which opened on the 6th of October, 1977.

In the early 1980s the county experienced an economic and population boom. Kiwifruit prices had hit $8.02 per tray and the county was the fastest growing in population with a 17.9% increase, helped by a 22.5% increase in the Hibiscus Coast. The economy of Rodney during this period would be largely based on meat cattle and other forms of agriculture.

As part of the local government reforms the county was abolished and replaced by Rodney District. The borders would remain largely the same aside from the incorporation of Helensville Borough and Taupaki from the newly formed Waitakere City, and a slight change to the border at Mangawhai.

== Ridings ==
Rodney County initially had 6 ridings: Kaukapakapa, Puhoi, Mahurangi, Tauhoa, Mangawai, and Albert.

== List of county chairmen ==
The Rodney County Council was presided over by a chairman. The following is a complete list of officeholders:

	Name	Term of office
1	Nathaniel Wilson	1877–1878
2	Henry Palmer	1878–1881
(1)	Nathaniel Wilson	1881–1885
3	Josiah Hill Hudson	1885–1887
4	Edward Browne	1885–1892
5	George Moor	1892
6	John Morison King	1892–1893
7	Thomas Adams Gubb	1893–1899
(1)	Nathaniel Wilson	1899–1905
8	Lewis Philip Becroft	1905–1911
9	George Wyatt Thompson	1911–1917
10	John Alfred Shepherd	1917–1920
11	John Morison	1920–1923
12	Frederick Hodgson	1923–1926
13	William John Schollum	1926–1932
14	Walter Kenneth Becroft	1932–1938
15	William Robinson Grant	1938–1947
(13)	William John Schollum	1947–1953
16	Thomas Oliver Llewellyn Jenkins	1953–1963
17	John James Granville	1963–1973
18	Gordon Mason	1973–1989

== See also ==
- List of former territorial authorities in New Zealand § Counties
