= Otamatea River (Northland) =

Coordinates: 36°15′30″S 174°15′38″E

Location
- Country: New Zealand

Physical characteristics
- Mouth
  - location: Kaipara Harbour
- Length: 18.5 km (11.5 mi)

The Otamatea River is a river in the Northland Region. A short and wide river, it flows southwest and could be considered an arm of the northern Kaipara Harbour. The Otamatea is formed by the confluence of the Wairau and Kaiwaka rivers and the North Auckland Line crosses at this point. Almost 300 metres (330 yd) wide at its origin, the river widens to 1.8 kilometres (1.1 mi) by its mouth opposite Tinopai. Several other broad tidal creeks flow into the Otamatea, including Raepare Creek, Awaroa Creek, Takahoa Creek and the Whakaki River on the left bank and the Arapaoa River on the right.

== Cultural references ==
The Otamatea River is depicted in Jane Mander's novel, The Story of a New Zealand River (1920), where the setting reflects her childhood experience of living in the isolated kauri milling settlement of Pukekaroro. The novel describes a journey up the river:

There were no mountains on the western bank of the river now, and the eastern ones had dwarfed. The river, too, had widened out, swelled at intervals by smelly creeks, sneaking from remote sources away among the hills. They passed fire-swept wastes, and blackened ranges and valleys, where denuded kauri trees, now often standing alone like giant spectres, held up their bleached heads imploringly to the sky. Once a gully opened out upon a dark level wall of stiff kahikateas, and once a break in the ranges revealed, on a distant green hill, a solitary house beside a clump of friendly pines.
