= Whangarei County =

County in New Zealand

Coordinates: 35°43′30″S 174°19′25″E

- County of New Zealand
- 1876–1989
- Capital: Whangarei, New Zealand
- History
  - Established: 1876
  - Disestablished: 1989
- Today part of: Whangarei District

Whangarei County was one of the counties of New Zealand in the North Island.

The first Whangarei County Council, elected in 1876, included Richard Sissons.

== See also ==
- List of former territorial authorities in New Zealand § Counties
