= Moerewa railway station =

Defunct railway station in New Zealand

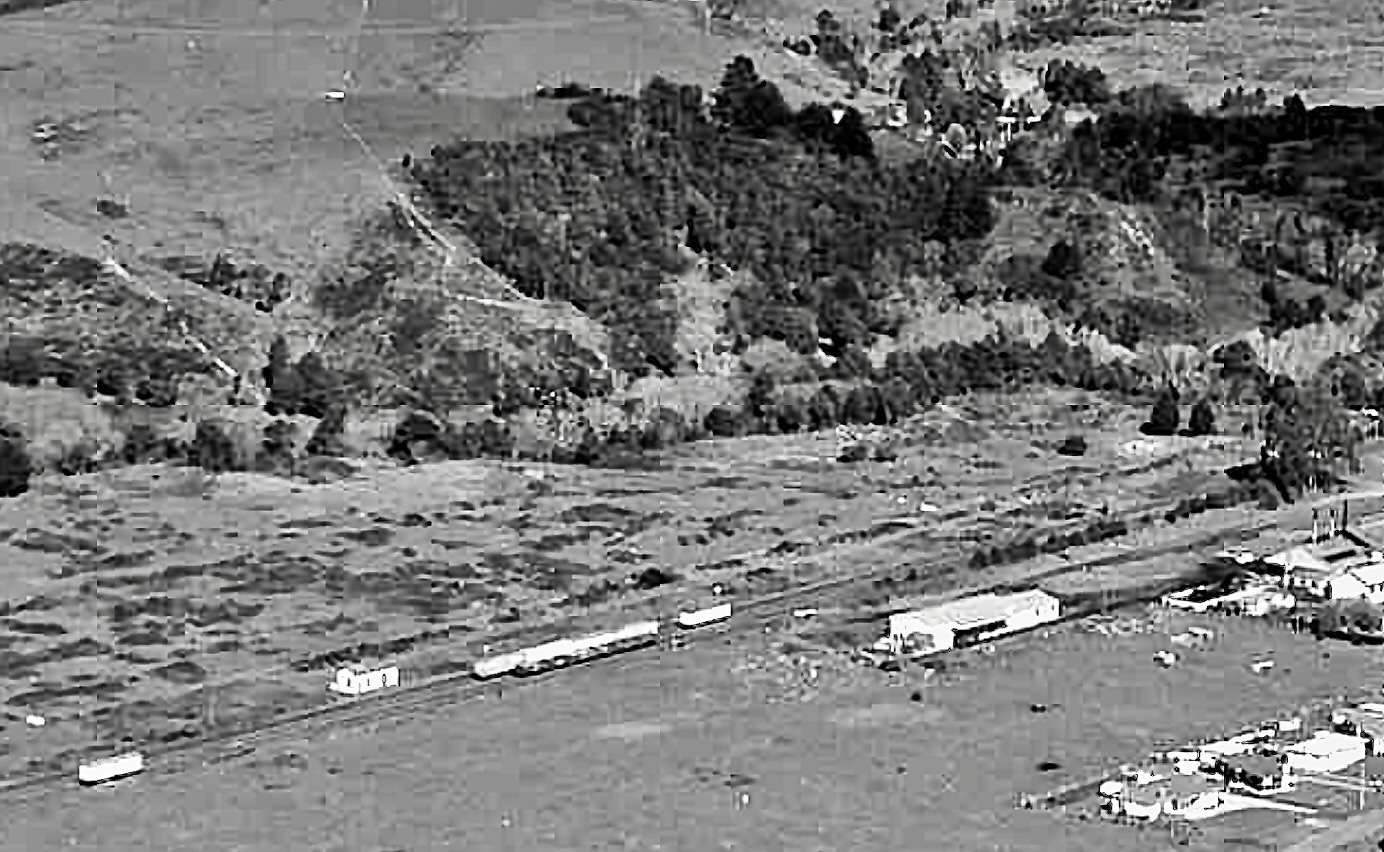
- Moerewa in 1962

General information
- Location: New Zealand
- Coordinates: 35.3870°S 174.0242°E
- Elevation: 61 ft (19 m)
- Line: Opua Branch

History
- Opened: 29 April 1912
- Closed: 21 June 1976

Services
Preceding station	Historical railways	Following station
Otiria; Line closed, station closed 2.83 km (1.76 mi) towards Whangārei	Opua Branch; NZR	Kawakawa; Line closed, station open 3.76 km (2.34 mi) towards Opua
Location

Moerewa railway station was a flag station at Moerewa on the Opua Branch of the North Auckland Line in New Zealand.

The portion of the Opua–Grahamtown Line from Kawakawa to what was then called Scoria Flat was finished about 1905. In May 1908 it was noted that trains ran to Scoria Flat about once a week, as there were no houses and "what little traffic arises is almost solely from villages further inland." By 1909 plans were being made for stockyards and a gravel pit, but on 23 December 1910 the Minister of Public Works decided to abandon the station at Scoria Flat and move the shelter shed, platform, goods shed, loading bank, small stockyards, 2 x 400 gallon tanks and sidings to Otiria Junction, "as the site was found unsuitable for the junction of the Kaikohe Branch." Bay of Islands County Council and others asked for the station to be reinstated, but that didn't happen until the Kauri Timber Company negotiated for a site for a sawmill.

On 14 July 1910 the Public Works Department connected the rails from Whangārei to Kawakawa. On 31 March 1911 the Towai–Kawakawa Section got a certificate of Inspection, as safe for traffic at 20 mph (32 km/h). The line from Whangārei was officially opened on Thursday 13 April 1911. Waipuna, as it was then known, didn't become a stopping place on the line until 29 April 1912. In 1921 trains took about 3½ hours to cover the 43 mi 54 ch (70.3 km) from Whangārei. From December 1925 to November 1956 the Auckland–Opua Northland Express called. Mixed trains continued a passenger service until 18 June 1976. The line from Otiria to Opua ceased to be used in 1985.

The Post Office, named Moerewa, moved from the sawmill to the station from 1 July 1914 to February 1934. Affco Meat Works opened in 1922, and had sidings from about 1925. By 1938 it was reported that heavy trains left Whangārei most evenings with stock for the freezing works. The station burnt down on 13 February 1926 and a letter in 1936 complained that only a shed replaced it. The sawmill closed in 1927. Moerewa Dairy Factory opened in 1929 A small office, shelter shed and a platform remained in 1962. By 1964 the passing loop could hold 42 wagons. From 16 March 1969 only private siding traffic remained. The rails were lifted in 1993. Pou Herenga Tai – Twin Coast Cycle Trail opened through the station site in 2017.

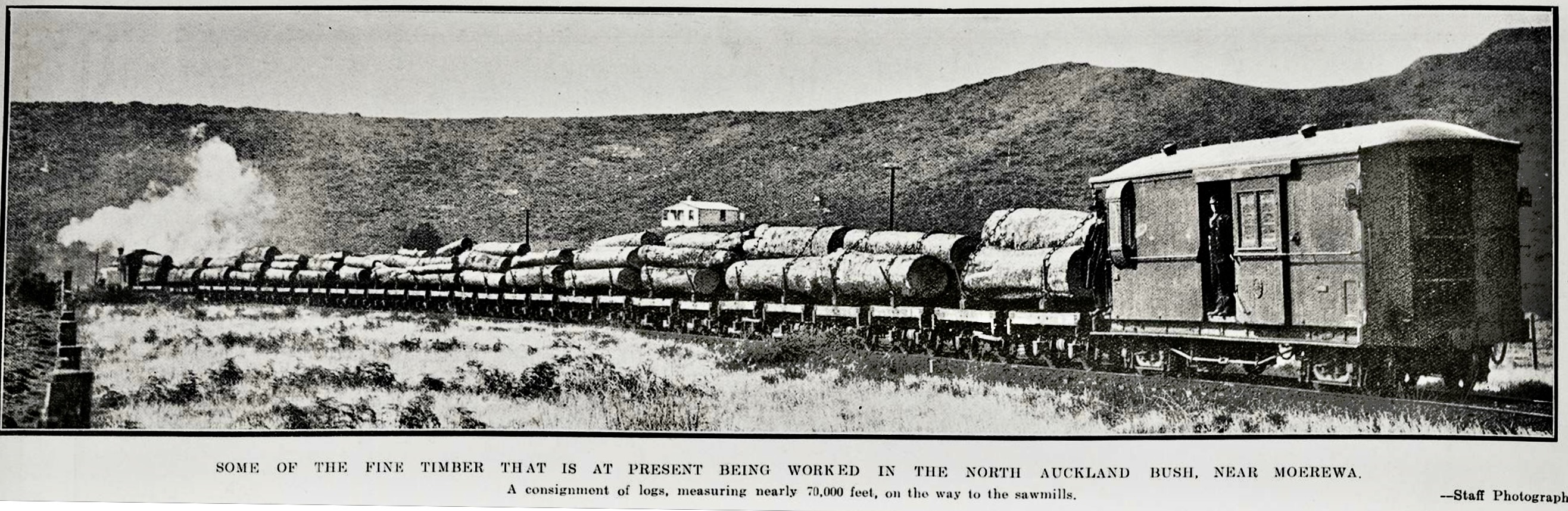
Log train near Moerewa in 1924

== Bibliography ==
- Churchman, Geoffrey B; Hurst, Tony (2001) [1990, 1991]. The Railways of New Zealand: A Journey through History (Second ed.). Transpress New Zealand. ISBN 0-908876-20-3.
