= Otiria railway station =

Defunct railway station in New Zealand

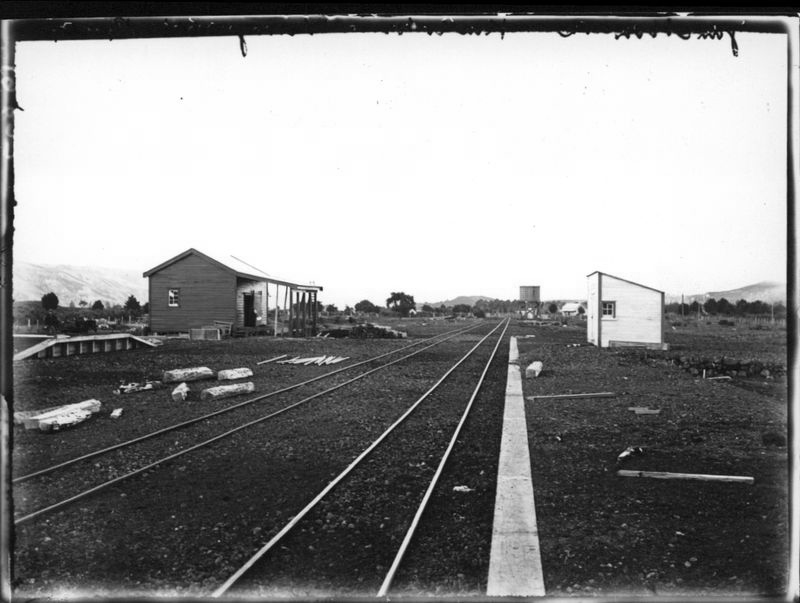
- Otiria in 1911

General information
- Location: New Zealand
- Coordinates: 35°23′58″S 174°00′03″E
- Elevation: 96 ft (29 m)
- Line: Okaihau Branch

History
- Opened: 13 April 1911
- Closed: 31 August 2016 mothballed

Services
Preceding station	Historical railways	Following station
Pokapu; Line mothballed, station closed 4.28 km (2.66 mi) towards Whangārei	Opua Branch and North Auckland Line; NZR	Moerewa; Line closed, station closed 2.83 km (1.76 mi) towards Opua
terminus	Okaihau Branch; NZR	Kawiti; Line closed, station closed 5.23 km (3.25 mi)
Location

Otiria railway station was a station on the North Auckland line in New Zealand, at its junction with the Ōkaihau and Opua Branches, at Otiria. It is now KiwiRail's most northerly station, though mothballed since 2016.

== History ==
The railway through Otiria, linking Onerahi (46 mi 45 ch (74.9 km) away), Whangārei and Kawakawa, opened on 13 April 1911, when the final Towai-Kawakawa section was added. Work then started on the Okaihau Branch, opening to Kaikohe on 1 May 1914 and Ōkaihau on 29 October 1923.

An 1880 plan proposed a direct route between Maromaku and Kawakawa, but by 1903 a plan had been made for Otiria station. In 1910 it was amended, as Waiharakeke Stream was too close to it. From 23 December 1910 Scoria Flat station (near Moerewa) was abandoned and its buildings and sidings moved to Otiria, about 1 mi (1.6 km) away. In 1911 a hut for a caretaker, stockyards and 2 platelayers' cottages were built. In 1913 the porter asked to rent a platelayer's cottage and £21,050 was spent to build the station, stationmaster's house (£450), siding with points and crossings (£417), and signals (£150). platform (1914 asphalted), latrines (£70), coal shed, cart approach, 20 ft (6.1 m) x 30 ft (9.1 m) goods shed, loading bank, stockyards, water service (two 6,000 gallon vats), latrines and a passing loop 64 for wagons. Otiria appeared in the annual returns of traffic from 1917, with timber initially very important. From 26 October 1918 to 13 February 1969 there was a Post Office at the station.

The rails were linked through to Auckland on 17 February 1923, but, due to unstable geology, Public Works Department ran trains along the 45.43 km (28.23 mi) of the route between Huarau (the station north of Maungaturoto) Portland until 15 December 1924, when trains from Auckland began running through Otiria. A leased refreshment room was open from at least 1934 to 1969. The Auckland-Opua, Northland Express cut almost 2 hours off the journey from Whangārei and ran until 12 November 1956, when it was replaced by Auckland-Ōkaihau 88 seater railcars. They stopped running on 31 July 1967, as they were becoming too unreliable. Mixed trains to Whangārei continued to run once a day, taking about 2 hours to cover the 42 mi 55 ch (68.7 km), which was only a few minutes slower than the Express had been in 1932, but slower than the 1h 23m of the railcars.

The final passenger train ran in 1976. The line from Otiria to Opua ceased to be used in 1985, and when the Ōkaihau Branch closed on 1 November 1987, Otiria became the northernmost station. On 15 August 1983 the station was closed to all traffic. In June 1987 the turntable was removed. The station building, platform, goods shed and gantry remained in 1989, but the station building was removed in 1990. The station closed on 15 August 1993, but timber continued to be railed until the line was mothballed from 31 August 2016. A business case was published in 2019 and in January 2020 the Government announced the reopening and building of a container terminal as part of a $109.7m investment in Northland rail, but, in June 2024, after election of a new government, KiwiRail announced that concrete sleepers already at the trackside (on which $33.5m had already been spent) would remain in place, but reopening beyond the Fonterra dairy factory at Kauri would depend on building the Marsden Point branch, after a further report in 2025.

== Cycle Trail ==
Pou Herenga Tai – Twin Coast Cycle Trail fully opened at the end of 2016, using the trackbeds of the Ōkaihau and Opua branches, linked by a gravel cycleway alongside the road through Otiria.

== See also ==
- Otiria
