= Ngāti Hine =

Māori iwi (tribe) in Aotearoa (New Zealand)

- Iwi (tribe) in Māoridom
- Rohe (region): Northland
- Waka (canoe): Māmari, Ngātokimatawhaorua, Māhūhū, Ruakaramea
- Website: www.ngatihine.maori.nz

Ngāti Hine is a Māori iwi (tribe) with a rohe (tribal area) in Northland, New Zealand. It is part of the wider Ngāpuhi iwi.

Its rohe (tribal area) covers the areas of Waiomio, Kawakawa, Taumarere, Moerewa, Motatau, Waimahae, Pakaraka, Otiria, Pipiwai, Kaikou and Te Horo.

== History ==
Ngāti Hine is descended from a female ancestor, Hineamaru, a great granddaughter of Rāhiri who settled in the Waiomio Valley, near Kawakawa. The prominent leader in the early years of European contact was Te Ruki Kawiti (1770s–1854).

Ngāti Hine sought to withdraw from Te Runanga-a-Iwi o Ngapuhi charitable trust in 2010, without withdrawing from Ngāpuhi.

== Hapū and marae ==
=== Marae ===
The marae (communal places) of Ngāti Hine include:

- Horomanga marae in Horomanga
- Eparaima Makapi meeting house in Kaikou
- Kawiti marae and Te Tawai Riri Maihi Kawiti meeting house in Waiomio
- Matawaia marae and Rangimarie meeting house in Matawaia
- Maungārongo marae and Maungārongo meeting house in Moerewa
- Miria marae and Te Rapunga meeting house in Waiomio
- Mohinui marae and Mohinui meeting house in Waiomio
- Mōtatau marae and Manu Koroki meeting house in Mōtatau
- Ōtiria marae and Tūmatauenga meeting house in Ōtiria
- Parakao marae and Te Aroha meeting house in Parakao
- Tau Henare marae in Pīpīwai
- Te Rito marae in Kawiti
- Tere Awatea marae in Orauta
- Matawaia o rangimarie me te Miria te whare kai

=== Hapū ===
The hapū (sub-tribes) of the Ngāti Hine rohe (tribal area) include:

- Ngāti Kahu o Torongare, based at Mohinui marae and Hohourongo meeting house in Waiomio
- Ngāti Kōpaki, based at Ōtiria marae and Tūmatauenga meeting house in Ōtiria
- Ngāti Ngāherehere, based at Matawaia marae and Rangimarie meeting house in Matawaia
- Ngāti Te Ara, based at Ōtiria marae and Tūmatauenga meeting house in Ōtiria
- Ngāti Te Tārawa, based at Mōtatau marae and Manu Koroki meeting house in Mōtatau
- Te Kau i Mua, based at Matawaia marae and Rangimarie meeting house in Matawaia
- Te Orewai, based at Tau Henare marae in Pīpīwai

== Governance ==
Te Rūnanga o Ngāti Hine represents the iwi in resource consent consultation under the Resource Management Act, but that does not imply formal Crown recognition of the iwi, or the trust's authority to act on behalf of the iwi. Under the Māori Fisheries Act, if Ngāti Hine correctly withdraws from the joint mandated iwi organisation of Ngāpuhi, it will also be recognised as an iwi under that Act. The charitable trust is governed by a tribal parliament, Te Mara a Hineamaru, which is made up of three representatives from 13 marae and based in Kawakawa.

The rohe (tribal area) of Ngāti Hine covers the territory of Whangārei District Council, Far North District Council and Northland Regional Council.

== Media ==
Ngāti Hine FM broadcasts to Ngāti Hine and Ngāpuhi on 99.1 FM and 99.6 FM in Whangārei.

== Notable people ==
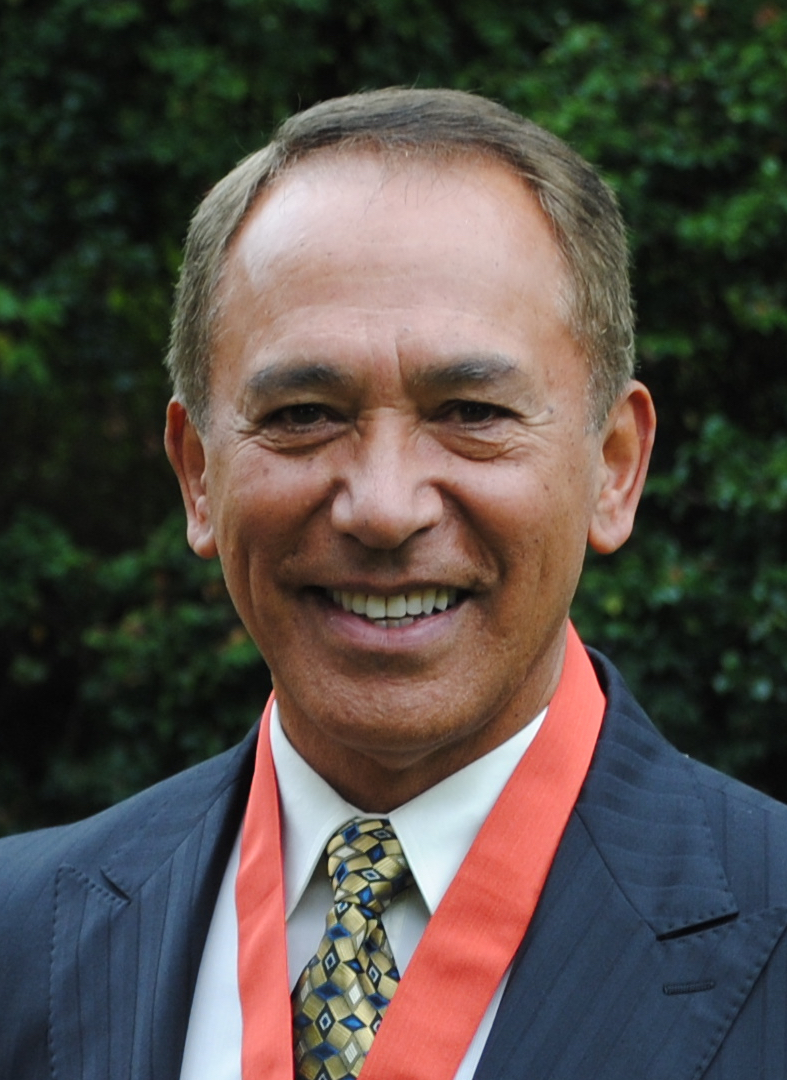
George Henare

- Arapeta Awatere, soldier and politician
- Ria Bond
- Ken Going, All Black
- Pearl Going, mountaineer
- Sid Going, All Black
- George Henare, actor
- Taurekareka Henare, politician
- Hōne Heke, tribal leader
- Donna Awatere Huata, politician and Maori rights activist.
- Kirihi Te Riri Maihi Kawiti, tribal leader.
- Maihi Paraone Kawiti, tribal leader
- Te Ruki Kawiti, prominent rangatira (chief). He and Hōne Heke successfully fought the British in the Flagstaff War in 1845–46.
- Todd Miller (rugby union), from the Going family
- Veeshayne Patuwai, TV presenter & actress.
- Lisa Reihana, artist.
- Shane Reti, politician
- Leilani Rorani, squash player
- Tau Henare, Politician
- James Henare, KBE, DSO, Maori leader
- Peeni Henare, Politician
- Willow-Jean Prime, Politician
- Robin Brooke, All Black
