= Jared Going =

NZ rugby union player (born 1976)

- Full name: Sidney Jared Going
- Born: 30 April 1976 (age 50)
- Height: 5 ft 11 in (180 cm)
- Weight: 191 lb (87 kg)
- Notable relative: Sid Going (father)

Rugby union career
- Position: Utility back
Provincial / State sides
Years	Team	Apps	(Points)
1997–05	Northland	64	(106)
Super Rugby
Years	Team	Apps	(Points)
2001	Blues	1	(0)

Sidney Jared Going (born 30 April 1976) is a New Zealand former professional rugby union player.

== Personal life ==
Going is the second eldest son of All Blacks halfback Sid Going and comes from Maromaku.

== Rugby career ==
A versatile Northland back, Going was a New Zealand representative in rugby sevens, winning four World Series titles.

Going made one appearance for the Blues during the 2001 Super 12 season, replacing James Arlidge off the bench against the Bulls at Pretoria's Loftus Versfeld Stadium.

In 2004, Going was a member of the New Zealand Maori team which competed at the 2004 Churchill Cup in Canada.
