= Ken Going =

New Zealand rugby union player (1942–2008)

- Born: Kenneth Tautohe Going; 18 February 1942 Kawakawa, New Zealand
- Died: 6 August 2008 (aged 66) Towai, New Zealand
- Height: 1.75 m (5 ft 9 in)
- Weight: 83 kg (183 lb)
- School: Church College
- Notable relatives: Sid Going (brother); Brian Going (brother); Todd Miller (nephew)

Rugby union career
- Position: Full-back
Provincial / State sides
Years	Team	Apps	(Points)
1963–75	North Auckland	130	(714)
International career
Years	Team	Apps	(Points)
1966–75	New Zealand Māori	24	
1974	New Zealand	0	(0)

Kenneth Tautohe Going (18 February 1942 – 6 August 2008) was a New Zealand rugby union player. A full-back, Going represented North Auckland at a provincial level as well as the New Zealand Māori and was a member of the New Zealand national side, the All Blacks.

== Rugby career ==
Ken played over 100 games for North Auckland, many alongside his brothers Sid and Brian.

Of Ngāti Hine and Ngāpuhi descent, Going played 24 matches for New Zealand Māori. His brothers Sid and Brian also played 16 and 23 games respectively for New Zealand Māori.

Ken also represented the North Island in the Interisland match and was an All Black trialist. He was selected, at the age of 32, for the 1974 New Zealand rugby union tour of Ireland, Wales and England. He is officially recorded as All Black number 742. He played three matches for the All Blacks against:

- Combined Irish Universities at Cork, won 10-3, scoring 2 penalty goals
- Leinster at Dublin, won 8-3
- Connacht at Galway, won 25-3, scoring a conversion and a penalty goal. Sid also played in the Connacht match.

Ken Going did not play any internationals, that honour fell to Joe Karam. Ken's brother Sid Going, All Black number 655, played 29 tests and 57 other matches for the All Blacks.
