= Rangiahua =

- Coordinates: 35°18′19″S 173°38′29″E
- Country: New Zealand
- Region: Northland Region
- District: Far North District

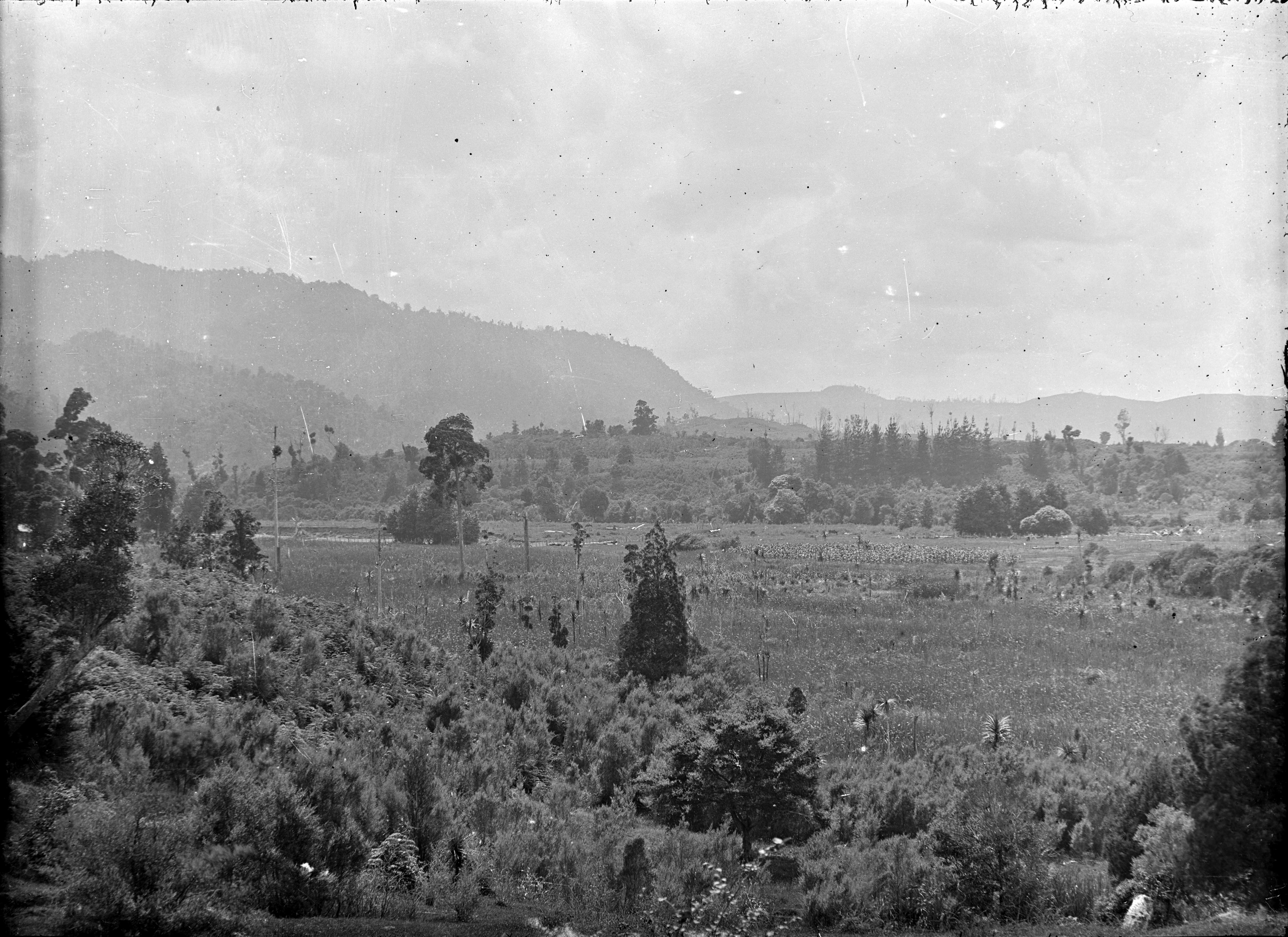
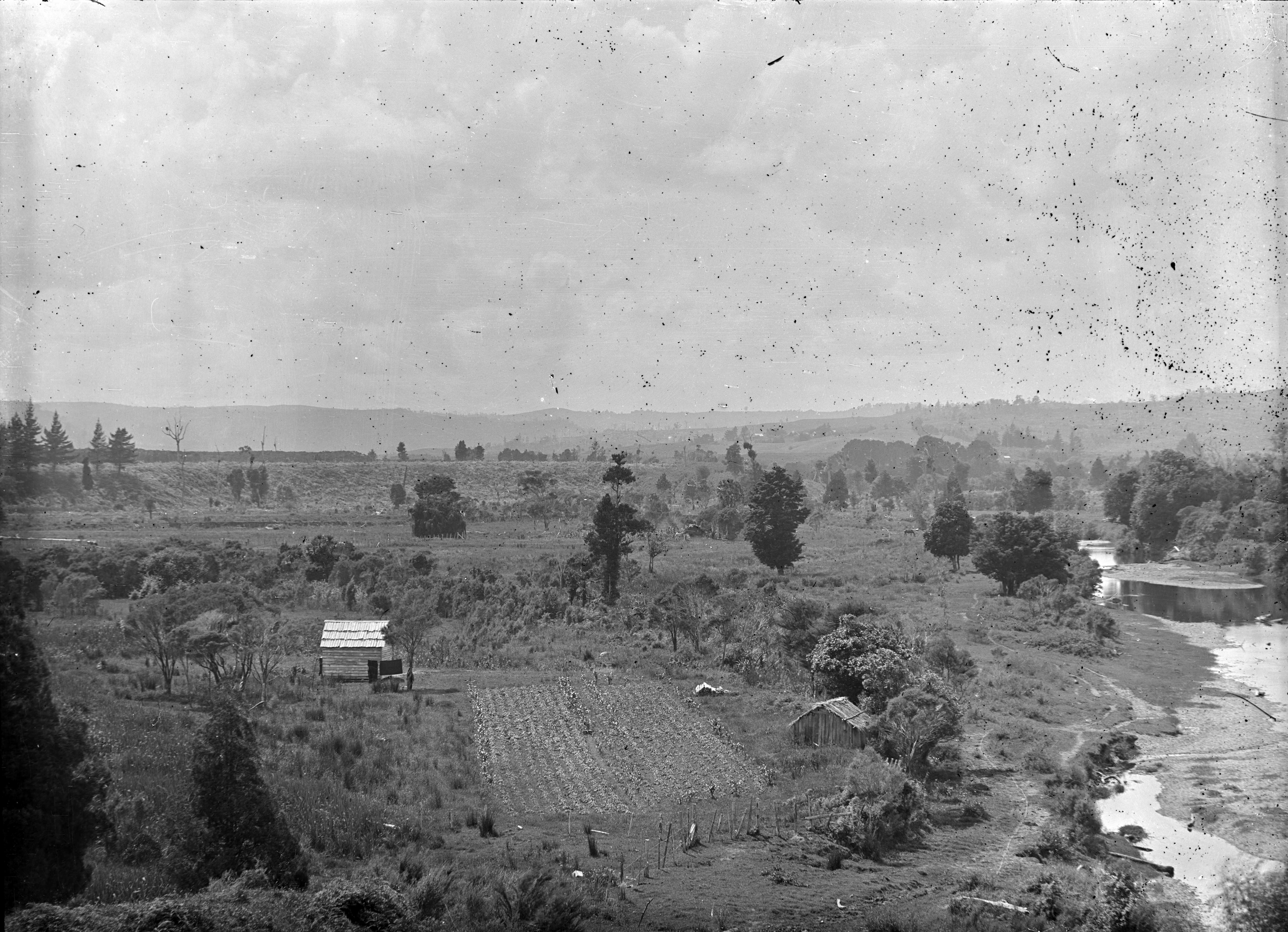
Panorama of the Waipapa River flat near Rangiahua, 1918

Rangiahua is a small locality near the Hokianga Harbour in the Northland Region of New Zealand. State Highway 1 passes through it. Umawera is to the west, and Okaihau to the east. Rangiahua is part of the Omahuta Forest-Horeke statistical area, which covers the upper Hokianga Harbour. For demographics of this area, see Horeke.

Rangiahua nearly became New Zealand's most northern railway terminus. In 1923, the Okaihau Branch, a branch line from Otiria on the North Auckland Line, was opened to Okaihau and work began on an extension to the Hokianga Harbour and Kaitaia. There were disputes over the viability of the line, but a compromise was reached that would have established Rangiahua as the terminus. Work progressed slowly throughout the 1920s and was abandoned during the Great Depression, even though the line was nearly complete - New Zealand's northernmost railway tunnel had been made and Rangiahua's railway yard and platform had been built. A report in 1931 concluded that the new line would not be economic and that the interest charge on borrowing money for its completion would increase the branch's operating loss.

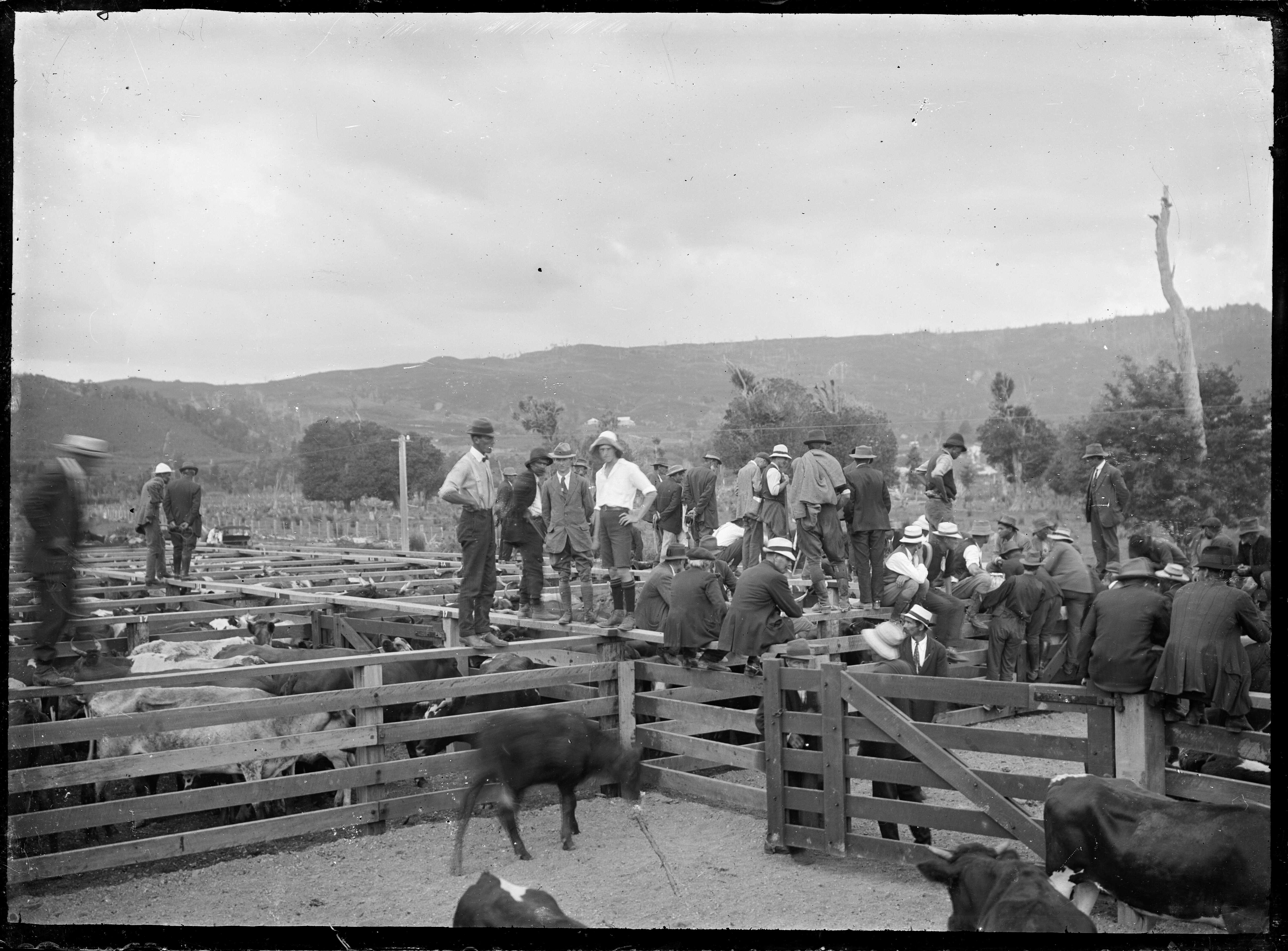
Saleyard at Rangiahua in 1918

In 1936, a review was conducted into the future of the line, and the decision was that no extension beyond Rangiahua would be economic, and that the section from Okaihau to Rangiahua would not be viable. The abandoned track and associated equipment was salvaged for use elsewhere, and today State Highway 1 runs where the station used to be, with the platform to the east and a loading bank to the west.

There is a Māori Cemetery here, called an urupā, situated near the New Zealand State Highway 1, which houses the grave of a Commonwealth casualty from World War I; Rifleman John Muriwai of the New Zealand forces contracted measles and pneumonia and died at Trentham Military Camp on 28 June 1915.
