= Veeshayne Patuwai =

Veeshayne Patuwai née Armstrong (born 1972) is a New Zealand television presenter, actress, emcee and singer and currently appears on two shows on the Māori Television network, a panelist on Ask Your Auntie and Freestyle, a half-hour fashion magazine show. She is fluent in Te Reo Māori and English and has a son, Hohaia.

She is of Ngā Puhi and Ngati Hine descent. She is the youngest of six children and her hometown is Moerewa. She graduated from Bay of Islands College and AUT. In the 1990s she was a Radio DJ on Mai FM. Her show was Queen of the Night. She gained the job through being a personal assistant. As a radio DJ, she won the Best New Broadcaster award in the 1995 Mobil Radio Awards.

Her acting credits include The Maori Merchant of Venice, where she played Nerissa, earning a nomination for Best Supporting Actress at the 2003 NZ Film and Television Awards, and Jackson's Wharf. She has recently started her own production company, Mad Ave Studios.

She is married to Tamati Patuwai, also an actor of Māori heritage, who appeared in the episodes of Xena: Warrior Princess, Mataku, Mercy Peak, and films such as The Piano.

== See also ==
- List of New Zealand television personalities
