= Ōkaihau =

- Town
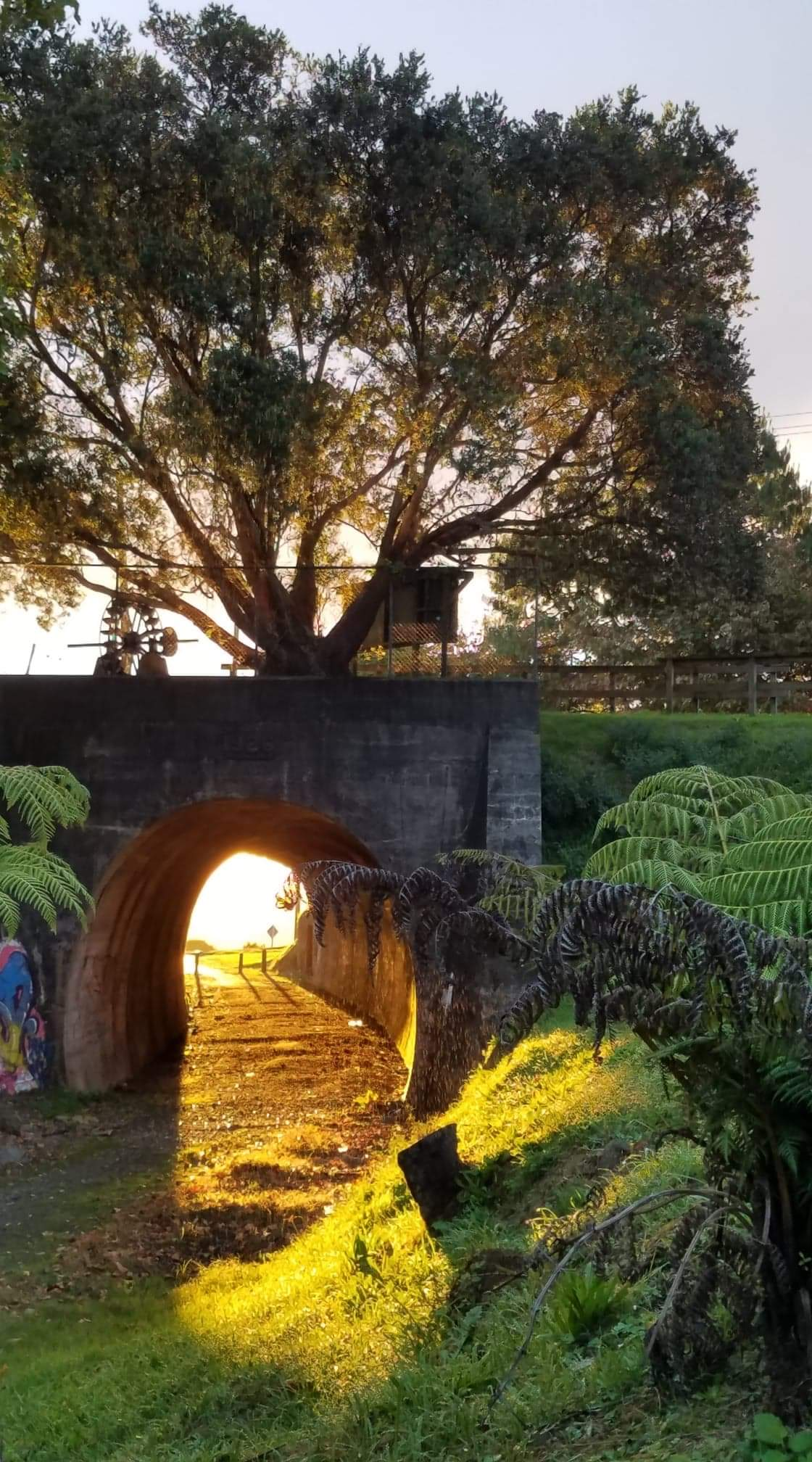
- Okaihau Rail Tunnel, built 1926
- Interactive map of Ōkaihau
- Coordinates: 35.321°S 173.771°E
- Country: New Zealand
- Region: Northland Region
- District: Far North District
- Ward: Kaikohe/Hokianga
- Community: Kaikohe-Hokianga
- Subdivision: Kaikohe
- Electorates: Northland; Te Tai Tokerau

Government
  - Territorial Authority: Far North District Council
  - Regional council: Northland Regional Council
  - Mayor of Far North: Moko Tepania
  - Northland MP: Grant McCallum
  - Te Tai Tokerau MP: TBD

Area
  - Total: 3.56 km^{2} (1.37 sq mi)

Population (June 2025)
  - Total: 380
  - Density: 110/km^{2} (280/sq mi)

Ōkaihau is a small town in the Northland Region of New Zealand's North Island, just north of Kaikohe. State Highway 1 passes through Ōkaihau making it fairly busy. Ōkaihau has a primary school (Ōkaihau Primary School) and a secondary school (Okaihau College).

The New Zealand Ministry for Culture and Heritage gives a translation of "place of feast of the winds" for Ōkaihau.

== History ==
Ōkaihau was a Māori village when the settlers arrived on the ridge which stands between Lake Ōmāpere and the Hokianga harbour. It was the northernmost point for the railway. Ōkaihau was very busy during early to mid 20th century, but the removal of the railway stopped the business and tourist flow.

== Demographics ==
Statistics New Zealand describes Ōkaihau as a rural settlement. It covers 3.56 km^{2} (1.37 sq mi) and had an estimated population of 380 as of June 2025, with a population density of 107 people per km^{2}. The settlement is part of the larger Ōkaihau statistical area.

Historical population for Ōkaihau settlement
Year	Pop.	±% p.a.
2006	360	—
2013	312	−2.02%
2018	324	+0.76%
2023	366	+2.47%

Ōkaihau had a population of 366 in the 2023 New Zealand census, an increase of 42 people (13.0%) since the 2018 census, and an increase of 54 people (17.3%) since the 2013 census. There were 180 males and 189 females in 135 dwellings. 1.6% of people identified as LGBTIQ+. The median age was 37.4 years (compared with 38.1 years nationally). There were 72 people (19.7%) aged under 15 years, 63 (17.2%) aged 15 to 29, 177 (48.4%) aged 30 to 64, and 51 (13.9%) aged 65 or older.

People could identify as more than one ethnicity. The results were 66.4% European (Pākehā), 45.1% Māori, 9.8% Pasifika, 1.6% Asian, and 2.5% other, which includes people giving their ethnicity as "New Zealander". English was spoken by 97.5%, Māori language by 13.1%, Samoan by 0.8% and other languages by 8.2%. No language could be spoken by 1.6% (e.g. too young to talk). New Zealand Sign Language was known by 0.8%. The percentage of people born overseas was 13.1, compared with 28.8% nationally.

Religious affiliations were 39.3% Christian, 0.8% Hindu, 2.5% Māori religious beliefs, 0.8% Buddhist, 0.8% New Age, and 1.6% other religions. People who answered that they had no religion were 48.4%, and 8.2% of people did not answer the census question.

Of those at least 15 years old, 33 (11.2%) people had a bachelor's or higher degree, 165 (56.1%) had a post-high school certificate or diploma, and 87 (29.6%) people exclusively held high school qualifications. The median income was $32,500, compared with $41,500 nationally. 15 people (5.1%) earned over $100,000 compared to 12.1% nationally. The employment status of those at least 15 was that 144 (49.0%) people were employed full-time, 27 (9.2%) were part-time, and 12 (4.1%) were unemployed.

=== Ōkaihau statistical area ===
Ōkaihau statistical area covers 147.68 km^{2} (57.02 sq mi) to the north and west of Lake Ōmāpere. It had an estimated population of 1,420 as of June 2025, with a population density of 9.6 people per km^{2}.

Historical population for Ōkaihau statistical area
Year	Pop.	±% p.a.
2006	1,077	—
2013	1,131	+0.70%
2018	1,236	+1.79%
2023	1,362	+1.96%

Ōkaihau had a population of 1,362 in the 2023 New Zealand census, an increase of 126 people (10.2%) since the 2018 census, and an increase of 231 people (20.4%) since the 2013 census. There were 654 males, 702 females and 3 people of other genders in 483 dwellings. 2.2% of people identified as LGBTIQ+. The median age was 40.2 years (compared with 38.1 years nationally). There were 276 people (20.3%) aged under 15 years, 237 (17.4%) aged 15 to 29, 642 (47.1%) aged 30 to 64, and 207 (15.2%) aged 65 or older.

People could identify as more than one ethnicity. The results were 78.2% European (Pākehā); 35.5% Māori; 6.4% Pasifika; 1.3% Asian; 0.4% Middle Eastern, Latin American and African New Zealanders (MELAA); and 4.0% other, which includes people giving their ethnicity as "New Zealander". English was spoken by 97.6%, Māori language by 7.5%, Samoan by 0.2% and other languages by 5.5%. No language could be spoken by 2.0% (e.g. too young to talk). New Zealand Sign Language was known by 0.7%. The percentage of people born overseas was 13.9, compared with 28.8% nationally.

Religious affiliations were 29.1% Christian, 0.2% Hindu, 3.3% Māori religious beliefs, 0.4% Buddhist, 0.7% New Age, and 1.3% other religions. People who answered that they had no religion were 58.1%, and 7.5% of people did not answer the census question.

Of those at least 15 years old, 135 (12.4%) people had a bachelor's or higher degree, 648 (59.7%) had a post-high school certificate or diploma, and 273 (25.1%) people exclusively held high school qualifications. The median income was $37,100, compared with $41,500 nationally. 69 people (6.4%) earned over $100,000 compared to 12.1% nationally. The employment status of those at least 15 was that 555 (51.1%) people were employed full-time, 171 (15.7%) were part-time, and 27 (2.5%) were unemployed.

== Transport ==
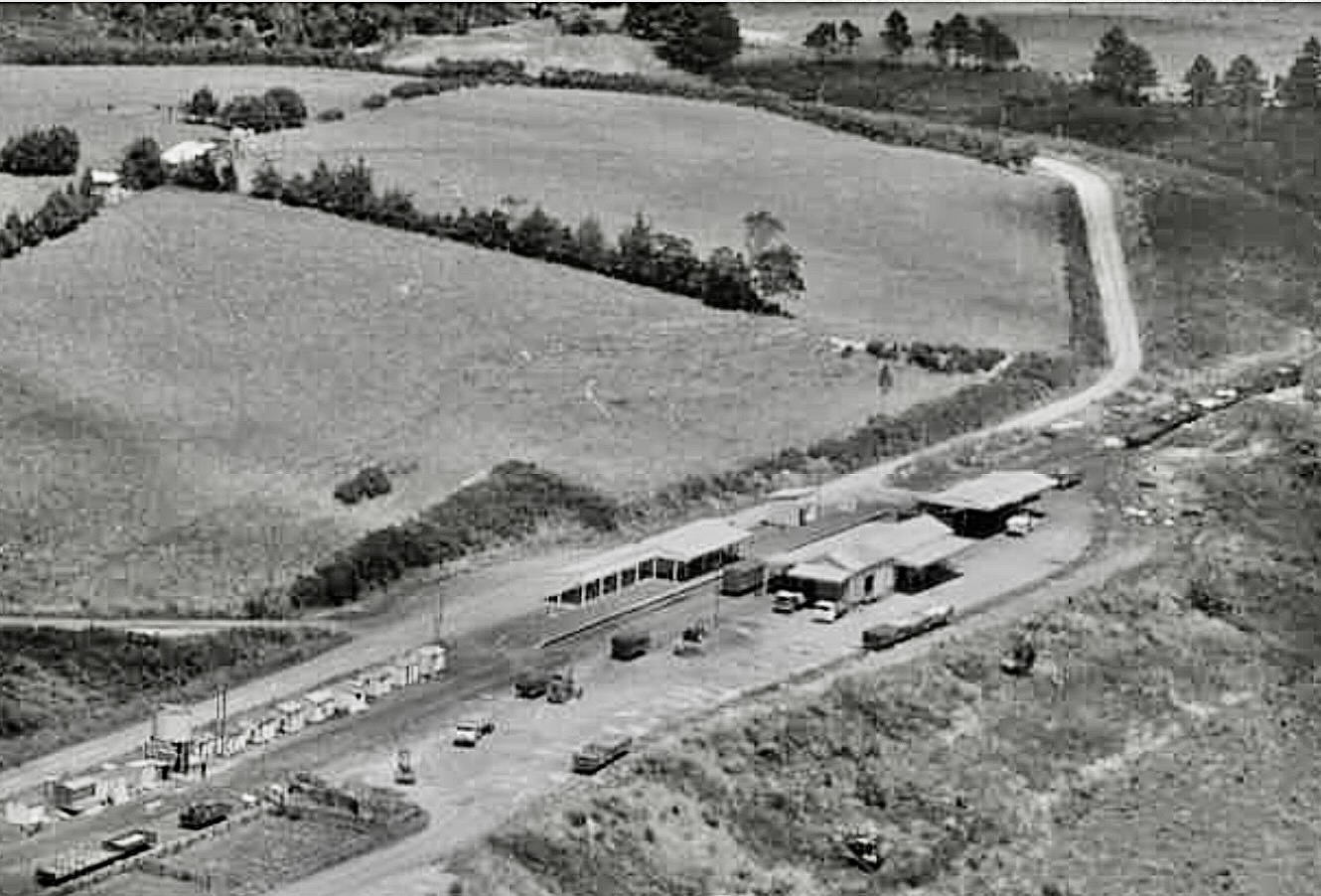
Okaihau railway station in 1966

On 29 October 1923, a branch line railway was opened to Ōkaihau from the junction with the North Auckland Line at Otiria. Work on an extension of the line beyond Ōkaihau to the Hokianga Harbour and Kaitaia proceeded slowly, and in 1936, the line was essentially complete to Rangiahua. It was then decided that construction beyond Rangiahua would be excessively expensive and the steep section from Ōkaihau to Rangiahua was seen as unnecessary and accordingly removed. The railway line became known as the Okaihau Branch and Ōkaihau became New Zealand's northernmost railway terminus. With Ōkaihau being on the main State Highway north (SH1) it became the transshipping point for goods from rail onto road and vice versa.

For the Ōkaihau Branch's first few decades of operation, passengers were catered for by mixed trains that carried freight as well and ran to slow timetables. These mixed services offered connections with the Northland Express passenger train that ran thrice weekly between Auckland and Opua. In November 1956, the carriage train was replaced by a railcar service run by RM class 88 seaters. The northern terminus was changed from Opua to Ōkaihau, and the railway line rose in prominence and importance. The railcars provided a considerable improvement in service and were very popular throughout their service duration. Mechanical faults plagued the railcars and they were cancelled in July 1967. Mixed trains continued to operate to Whangārei until 21 June 1976, when the line became freight-only. Declining freight volumes after deregulation of the transport industry in 1983 led to the closure of the line on 1 November 1987.

Today, the Ōkaihau railway station platform edge remains in its former location beside a flat area that was once the railway yard, and just to the north of the town is a tunnel on the section to Rangiahua, New Zealand's northernmost railway tunnel.

There have been calls and proposals to reopen the Ōkaihau Branch to carry forestry traffic but to date nothing has yet come to fruition.

== Education ==
=== History ===
The earliest official record of a school in Ōkaihau was in 1874, prior to this, school had been taught by Mr. Joseph Harrison from 1870 or 1871. The earliest date is not known. The settlers, through Mr. McCloud the M.P for the Bay of Islands at the time arranged to provide the timber for a school and the government would erect it and pay the teacher in full. The school was built in 1874, opening with a roll of 21 pupils.

By 1889 the school building was too small and was shifted down to serve as the Upper Waihou School. A larger one was built in its place. This bigger school was known continuously as the "Main School" until consolidation over forty years later. Other schools opened in the area at later dates were; Upper Waihou, Rangi Point, Cooks Road, Utakura, Okaihau East and Okaihau Public Works School. Due to the large influx of workers on the proposed railway line to Kaitaia the Public Works School became necessary. It grew to have three teachers.

Prior to 1938 there was no secondary education available to those in the Ōkaihau area. Students would either have to board in Auckland or Whangārei, or travel to Kaikohe by train. The trip to Kaikohe was an endurance test for students as they would often not get home until 6pm or later. On 4 April 1938 a consolidated school was opened with a roll of 180. The first headmaster was Mr. A. Burnett.

In 1947 the roll had increased to such an extent the Consolidated School became a District High School and with the addition of two prefabricated buildings served as both primary and secondary schools. The first headmaster was Mr. J. Lee and Mr. T. Batty assisted in the High School department. Further expansion took place in 1963 when a separate Infant Block was erected across the road from the Main School.

=== Okaihau College ===
In 1973 the High School was granted Form 1–7 (Year 7–13) status and became Okaihau College with Mr. Laurenson as first principal. At the same time a full primary school was completed around the Infant Block with Mr. N. Thomson becoming the first headmaster. At the end of 1973 there were 263 pupils attending the college and 219 at the primary school.

Okaihau College has grown to a current student roll of 263 students.

=== Okaihau Primary School ===
Okaihau Primary School caters for children between Years 1 and 6 and has a roll of 134 students.

== Present ==
Ōkaihau village has a butchery, cafes, a mechanics, two dairies, a Four Square and a takeaways.

== Name ==
The name "Ōkaihau" is a Māori name meaning "Feast of the winds", which is relevant to the location of the area on a ridge over 200 m above sea level. This part of New Zealand was originally a dense wooded landscape and even today huge old trees such as pūriri are found in the area of the school.
