= Sid Going =

New Zealand rugby union footballer (1943–2024)

Sid Going MBE
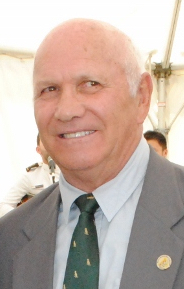
- Going in 2013
- Born: Sidney Milton Going; 19 August 1943 Kawakawa, New Zealand
- Died: 17 May 2024 (aged 80) Maromaku, New Zealand
- Height: 1.78 m (5 ft 10 in)
- Weight: 81 kg (179 lb)
- School: Northland College; Church College of New Zealand
- Notable relatives: Jared Going (son); Ken Going (brother); Todd Miller (nephew)

Rugby union career
- Position: Halfback
Provincial / State sides
Years	Team	Apps	(Points)
1965–1978	North Auckland	110	
International career
Years	Team	Apps	(Points)
1967–1977	New Zealand	29	(44)
1965–1977	New Zealand Māori		

Sidney Milton Going MBE (19 August 1943 – 17 May 2024) was a New Zealand rugby union footballer. Dubbed Super Sid by his fans, he played 86 matches, including 29 tests, for the All Blacks between 1967 and 1977. He represented North Auckland domestically.

== Early life and family ==
Born in Kawakawa on 19 August 1943, Going was educated at Maromaku Primary School, Northland College and Church College of New Zealand. In 1962, at the age of 19, he was a missionary in Canada for the Church of Jesus Christ of Latter-day Saints (LDS Church). Going and his wife, Colleen, had five children, including sons, Jared, who represented New Zealand in Sevens rugby, and Milton, who played Super Rugby for the Crusaders. Going was also the uncle of All Black Todd Miller. Of Māori descent, Going affiliated with the Ngāpuhi and Ngāti Hine iwi.

== Career ==
Many rate him as New Zealand's greatest running halfback, his flair and unpredictability bagging him 10 tries in test matches, and 23 in All Black games. A key member of the 1972–1973 All Blacks touring side to Great Britain and Ireland, Going's combination with flanker and captain Ian Kirkpatrick was pivotal. The side won tests against Wales, England, and Scotland before being narrowly denied an unprecedented Grand Slam by their 10–10 draw with Ireland.

Going was a favourite with North Auckland fans during his long tenure there as halfback from 1965 to 1978, often playing alongside his brothers, Ken and Brian, and in New Zealand Māori sides. The brothers' specialty was a blindside triple-scissors movement, which almost gave Northland a late victory in the 1971 match against the touring British Lions. That side featured the Welsh great Gareth Edwards, whose duels with Going were a feature of the tour, which produced for the Lions their first test series victory over the All Blacks. Going was awarded the Tom French Cup for Māori player of the year a record six times; earning the accolade consecutively from 1967 to 1972.

Going was a member of the 1976 All Blacks touring side to South Africa, his team experiencing a 3–1 series loss to the Springboks. Although only a part-time goal-kicker, Going performed this task during the test matches because of injuries to other players. His All Black career finished during the 1977 British Lions tour to New Zealand, when he was replaced after the second of four test matches.

In the 1977 New Year Honours, Going was appointed a Member of the Order of the British Empire, for services to rugby. He retired from first-class rugby in 1978, but continued his involvement with the game, coaching Northland secondary school teams from 1988 to 1992, and being selector–coach of the first-class side from 1993 to 1996.

In 1978, Bob Howitt wrote a biography of Going entitled Super Sid – The Story of a Great All Black.

At the 2020 Halberg Awards, Going was inducted into the New Zealand Sports Hall of Fame.

== LDS Church ==
Going was a bishop in the LDS church for seven years, and was a former president of the Hamilton New Zealand Temple.

== Death ==
Going died at his home in Maromaku on 17 May 2024, at the age of 80.

Awards
Preceded by Waka Nathan	Tom French Memorial; Māori rugby union player of the year 1967, 1968, 1969, 1970, 1971, 1972	Succeeded by Tane Norton
