= Eru Potaka-Dewes =

New Zealand actor and Māori activist

Eru Potaka-Dewes (1939 in Ruatoria – 7 August 2009 in Rotorua) was a New Zealand actor, Māori religious leader and activist.

== Life and career ==
Eru Potaka-Dewes attended Waiomatatini Native Primary School, Gisborne Boys' High School, and Otago University, where he studied history and teaching. Afterwards he became an Anglican priest.

After living a few years in Australia, he returned to New Zealand in the 1980s and engaged in political and legal debates concerning Maori questions, particularly those related to the Treaty of Waitangi.

In 1991, Potaka-Dewes established the Aotearoa-NZ Action Committee's Alternative Immigration Office (ANZAC) as an immigration centre for indigenous peoples.

During the 1990s and early 2000s (decade), he also was working as an actor, appearing in Jane Campion's film The Piano and Rapa-Nui, produced by Kevin Costner.

He was the dean of theology at the Maori Anglican Theological College in Rotorua and taught in several Auckland and Rotorua schools.

Potaka-Dewes died on 7 August 2009 in Rotorua, aged 70. He was survived by his wife, Kiri, and his children.

== Filmography ==
- 1993: The Piano
- 1993: The Rainbow Warrior
- 1994: Rapa-Nui
- 1999: What Becomes of the Broken Hearted?
- 2000: Jubilee
- 2002: The Maori Merchant of Venice
