= Maihi Paraone Kawiti =

Maihi Paraone Kawiti (1807–21 May 1889) was a New Zealand tribal leader. Of Māori descent, he identified with the Ngāti Hine hapū of the Ngāpuhi iwi. He was born in Waiomio, Northland, New Zealand in 1807. His father was Te Ruki Kawiti. One of his sons was Kirihi Te Riri Maihi Kawiti.

Prior to succeeding his father as leader of the Ngāti Hine hapū, Maihi Paraone was a missionary teacher at Mangakahia; he was a supporter of te ture (the law) and te whakapona (the gospel).

== Leadership of the Ngāti Hine hapū ==
As the leader of the Ngāti Hine hapū, deputations came to Maihi Paraone Kawiti from the Taranaki and Waikato iwi asking the Ngāpuhi to join the Māori King Movement; the reply from Maihi Paraone Kawiti was that the Ngāpuhi had no desire for a "Māori Kīngi" as "Kuini Wikitoria" was their "Kingi".

Maihi Paraone Kawiti arranged for the fifth flagpole to be erected at Kororāreka at the site where the flagpoles had been repeatedly cut down during the Flagstaff War; this occurred in January 1858, with the flag being named Whakakotahitanga, "being at one with the Queen". As a further symbolic act, the 400 Ngāpuhi warriors involved in preparing and erecting the flagpole were selected from the ‘rebel’ forces of Te Ruki Kawiti and Hōne Heke – that is, Ngāpuhi from the hapū of Tāmati Wāka Nene (who had fought as allies of the British forces during the Flagstaff War) observed, but did not participate in the erection of the fifth flagpole. The restoration of the flagpole was presented by Maihi Paraone Kawiti as a voluntary act on the part of the Ngāpuhi that had cut it down in 1845, and they would not allow any other to render any assistance in this work.
