= The Maori Merchant of Venice =

- Directed by: Don Selwyn
- Written by: William Shakespeare; Pei Te Hurinui Jones
- Produced by: Ruth Kaupua
- Starring: Waihoroi Shortland; Ngarimu Daniels; Te Rangihau Gilbert; Scotty Morrison; Veeshayne Armstrong; Eru Potaka-Dewes
- Production company: He Taonga Films
- Release date: 17 February 2002
- Running time: 158 minutes
- Country: New Zealand
- Language: Māori

The Maori Merchant of Venice (Māori: Te Tangata Whai Rawa o Weniti, pronounced [tɛ ˈtaŋata ˈɸai ˈɾawa ɔ ˈweːniti], lit. 'The Richest Man in Venice') is a 2002 New Zealand drama film in the Māori language (with English subtitles), directed by Don Selwyn.

== Production ==
The play The Merchant of Venice was translated into Māori in 1945 by Pei Te Hurinui Jones, and his translation is used for the film. It is the first Māori-language film adaptation of any of William Shakespeare's plays. The film was shot in Auckland, at the Church of the Holy Sepulchre - Te Mīhana Māori, but "recreate[d] 16th century Venice, with costumes and surroundings to fit the original setting".

== Cast ==
Almost all the film's actors are Māori, many of them acting for the cinema for the first time. Waihoroi Shortland stars as Hairoka (Shylock), Ngarimu Daniels as Pohia (Portia), Te Rangihau Gilbert as Patanio (Bassanio), Scotty Morrison as Anatonio (Antonio) and Veeshayne Armstrong as Nerita (Nerissa).

== Reception ==
According to the New Zealand Film Commission, the film deals with the themes of "religious discrimination, revenge for past wrongs", and "explores the nature of justice and mercy" as well as "the effect of heritage on an individual’s life decisions and the strength, wit and wisdom of women": "The Maori take on Shakespeare's 'pound of flesh' drama is a story of deep seated social and religious prejudice, in which the Jew (Shylock) has a long memory of oppression, but revenge is not so sweet." Valerie Wayne, in The Contemporary Pacific, underlined the apparent parallel drawn by the film between the oppression suffered by Shylock because of his Judaism and the sometimes violent subjugation of Māori by the colonial authorities in nineteenth century New Zealand.

Reviewing The Maori Merchant of Venice for Te Kete Ipurangi, Lana Simmons-Donaldson described it as "an educational, even motivational tool" for Māori language learners, and provided glowing praise:

No sex, action or violence here, Te Tangata Whai Rawa o Wēniti makes a refreshing change to the usual menu on offer to the movie going public. Chivalry, camaraderie, romance, justice, honour, cruelty, aristocracy and poverty all in te reo Māori, it's very palatable even exquisite depending on your taste. [...] Rurutao (Shakespeare) himself would have wept at its poetic brilliance.

== Awards ==
The film won the audience award for best feature at the Hawaii International Film Festival in 2002, while Waihoroi Shortland won the film award for best actor at the New Zealand Film and TV Awards in 2003.

== Other Māori productions of Shakespeare plays ==
The Merchant of Venice is not the only Shakespearian play to have been adapted to Māori themes, though it is the only one to have been released as a feature film. Adaptations of Othello, using a Māori cast and usually set during either the Musket Wars or New Zealand Wars of the nineteenth century, have been performed on numerous occasions since the late 1990s, most notably at Christchurch's Court Theatre in 2001.
