= Rapa-Nui (film) =

1994 American film directed by Kevin Reynolds

- Theatrical release poster
- Directed by: Kevin Reynolds
- Written by: Kevin Reynolds; Tim Rose Price
- Story by: Kevin Reynolds
- Produced by: Kevin Costner; Jim Wilson
- Starring: Jason Scott Lee; Esai Morales; Sandrine Holt
- Cinematography: Stephen F. Windon
- Edited by: Peter Boyle
- Music by: Stewart Copeland
- Production companies: Maverick Films; Tig Productions
- Distributed by: Warner Bros.
- Release date: September 9, 1994
- Running time: 107 minutes
- Countries: United States; Australia
- Language: English
- Budget: $20 million
- Box office: $305,070

Rapa-Nui is a 1994 American historical action-adventure film directed by Kevin Reynolds and co-produced by Kevin Costner, who starred in Reynolds's previous film, Robin Hood: Prince of Thieves (1991). The plot is based on Rapa Nui legends of Easter Island, Chile, in particular the race for the sooty tern's egg in the Birdman Cult.

The historic details of this film are questionable, and though the central theme—the destruction of the island's irreplaceable forests—is well-authenticated, the idea that this led to the destruction of the Rapa Nui is questionable. The struggle in the story is derived from the legend of the Hanau epe.

== Plot ==
There are two classes of people: Long Ears and Short Ears. Long Ears, marked by large wooden plugs in their earlobes and a certain tattoo, are the ruling class. The working-class Short Ears have no ear plugs and a different tattoo. Young men from each Long Ear tribe compete in the annual Birdman Competition. The winner's tribe gets to rule the island for a year.

Ariki-mau (Eru Potaka-Dewes) has been the Birdman (Island King) for 20 years. He has a conviction that one day the gods will arrive in a great white canoe and take him to heaven. Tupa (George Henare), his advisor tells him to build more and bigger moai statues to curry favor with the gods and encourage them to come sooner. Ariki-mau petulantly rejects the latest statue—which stands over 20 feet (6.1 m) tall—as too small. The Short Ear workers are forced to build an even bigger statue in an impossibly short amount of time. The king's advisor ruthlessly enforces the rules and status quo by publicly killing a Short Ear fisherman who had accidentally caught a taboo fish.

Long Ear Noro (Jason Scott Lee) and Ramana (Sandrine Holt), a Short Ear, are both rejects in their tribes—her father was banished for building an unlucky canoe. Noro's father stole a canoe and sailed away, and is accused of abandoning the tribe. They have a secret relationship and have fallen in love.

Ariki-mau tells Noro that he has to compete in the Birdman Competition so Ariki-mau can continue to rule the island. Noro asks if he can marry Ramana if he wins the Birdman Competition. The king reluctantly agrees. The king's advisor claims that Ramana's skin is too dark and that she should be purified by spending the time from now until the Birdman Competition (six months) in the "Virgin’s Cave". He checks her virginity and snidely remarks to Noro, who is watching Ramana being lowered to the cave, that she isn't right for the Virgin's Cave and that it will be their secret. Ramana takes one last look at the sunset and goes into the cave.

Noro approaches Ramana's banished father, a canoe maker, and asks him to help him train for the Birdman competition. He initially refuses, because it is Noro's fault that his daughter is confined to a cave, but later relents and trains Noro. While training Noro he explains that he and Noro's father were great friends once and that he gave the canoe to Noro's father. He further explains that Noro's father sailed away after discovering a piece of a shipwrecked Spanish galleon, thus breaking the long-held belief that Rapa Nui is the only land left with people on the Earth.

Meanwhile, the Short Ears are beginning to starve because the king insists on them working on the new statue instead of growing food but continues taking the full quota of their remaining food for the Long Ears. The resources of the island are being rapidly used up and depleted (with the last remaining tree being cut down), due to the extensive moai construction and overpopulation. Noro is the only person worried about the resource depletion, but his concerns are dismissed by the increasingly senile Ariki-mau.

Noro sneaks some food to his Short Ear friend Make (Esai Morales) and shares his plans to marry Ramana. Make reacts badly and Noro realizes that Make loves her, too. Make declares that they are no longer friends and runs off. Separately, Noro and Make visit Ramana at her cave, bringing her food and talking to her through the barrier at the mouth of the cave. They both declare their love to her. She always responds, but she sounds despondent.

After a supply shortage results in the death of one of the Short Ears (Heki, the former master carver), they demand half of the wood, food and other materials and that they be allowed to compete in the Birdman Competition. The King's advisor initially refuses and orders their death. However, the King gives in to their demands after realizing that if the Short Ears die no one will build the moai. The King, however, only allows them to compete after the moai has been completed. He makes the condition that if the Short Ear competitor loses he will be sacrificed. Despite these conditions Make accepts the position of the Birdman Competitor on the condition he be allowed to marry Ramana if he wins. The King agrees and Make spends all his time working and training, leaving no time for sleep or other recreational activities. Meanwhile, work on the great moai has become so important that the Short Ears sacrifice their food to complete it.

Finally it is the Birdman Competition. Nine competitors must swim to a close by islet surrounded by pounding surf, climb the cliffs to get an egg from the nest of a sooty tern and bring it back. The first to return wins for his tribe. Noro barely wins and Ariki-mau gets to be the island's ruler for another year.

Ramana is brought from the cave, pale from her long underground stay and obviously pregnant. Before anything is decided about the fate of Ramana or Make, an iceberg is spotted off the coast. Ariki-mau believes that the iceberg is the great white canoe sent to take him to the gods and goes out to it with some of his followers. After the iceberg has carried Ariki-mau away, the advisor attempts to seize control of the island, but Make kills him and the Short Ears stage a rebellion, slaughtering and even eating the remains of the Long Ears. Noro alone survives, as Make allows him to live, and Noro, Ramana and their baby escape the island in a canoe Ramana's father built.

A post-credits scene states that archaeological evidence proves that Pitcairn Island was settled some 1,500 miles (2,400 km) away, providing hope that Noro, Ramana and their daughter made it to a new land.

== Cast ==
- Jason Scott Lee as Noro
- Esai Morales as Make
- Sandrine Holt as Ramana
- Eru Potaka-Dewes as Ariki-mau
- Gordon Hatfield as Riro
- Anzac Wallace as Haoa
- George Henare as Tupa
- Rena Owen as Hitirenga
- Pete Smith as Priest
- Rawiri Paratene as Priest
- Cliff Curtis as Short Ear
- Lawrence Makoare as Atta
- Hori Ahipene as Long Ear Overseer
- Nathaniel Lees as Long Ear Chief
- Waihoroi Shortland as Long Ear Chief
- Grant McFarland as Long Ear Chief

== Production ==
Director Kevin Reynolds came across the script for Rapa Nui in 1985 and spent the next decade attempting to get the film made. Later Reynolds said singled out Rapa-Nui as his "worst" film: "I didn’t succeed, because I didn’t come close enough to what I’d originally intended, tried to do. I could blame it on a lot of circumstances and ultimately I have to take some responsibility for it myself, because I made a lot of the choices. But there were so many circumstances that went against that picture that it overwhelmed it, ultimately, and it was not close enough to what I wanted it to be."

== Release ==
The film opened on September 9, 1994, in limited release in the United States on 9 screens and grossed $63,872 in its opening weekend.

== Historical accuracy issues ==
The film can be considered a condensed history of the collapse of the Easter Island civilization. The struggle between the Long Ears and Short Ears is derived from the legend of the hanau epe (long ears), who are supposed to have been almost all killed by the hanau momoko (short ears), leaving a sole survivor, as in the film.

Interpretations of this story have been made, ranging from a class struggle, similar to that depicted in the film, to a clash between migrant people, with incomers fighting natives. There is no single accepted interpretation, and many scholars consider the story to be either pure myth, or such a garbled version of real events as to be ultimately indecipherable. It has been argued that the names mean "stocky" and "slim" peoples, not long- and short-eared ones.

The deforestation is a fact of the island's history, which may have caused widespread famine due to ecological collapse and a catastrophic drop in population, accompanied by wars between clans for control of dwindling resources. However, it has also been proposed that the deforestation was primarily due to Polynesian rats (Rattus exulans) and that the islanders adapted to this change gradually.

The plot mixes elements of two periods: the era of the moai and the later Birdman Cult. If the conflict between the Long Ears and the Short Ears was real, it was over long before the Birdman Cult began.

The name Rapa Nui, commonly used, may not have been the original native name; that may have been Te Pito te Henua ("the Navel of the World"), a phrase used in the film, though there are other possibilities.

== Year-end lists ==
- Top 12 worst (Alphabetically ordered, not ranked) – David Elliott, The San Diego Union-Tribune
- Siskel & Ebert Worst of 1994

== See also ==
- Collapse by Jared Diamond, which details the historic deforestation of Easter Island along with other accounts of how societies collapse or succeed.
