= Motatau =

- Interactive map of Motatau
- Coordinates: 35°29′25″S 174°2′7″E
- Country: New Zealand
- Region: Northland Region
- District: Far North District
- Ward: Bay of Islands-Whangaroa Ward
- Community: Bay of Islands-Whangaroa
- Subdivision: Kawakawa-Moerewa
- Electorates: Northland; Te Tai Tokerau

Government
  - Territorial Authority: Far North District Council
  - Regional council: Northland Regional Council
  - Mayor of Far North: Moko Tepania
  - Northland MP: Grant McCallum
  - Te Tai Tokerau MP: Mariameno Kapa-Kingi

Motatau or Mōtatau is a locality in the Northland Region of the North Island of New Zealand. Maromaku is to the east. The Taikirau Stream flows from east through Motatau and then runs northwest to join the Waiharakeke Stream. The North Auckland Line runs through Motatau.

The name is Māori for "to speak to oneself".

Motatau has one marae. Mōtatau Marae and Manu Koroki are a meeting place for the Ngāpuhi hapū of Ngāti Hine and Ngāti Te Tāwera.

== Demographics ==
Motatau is in an SA1 statistical area which covers 46.45 km^{2} (17.93 sq mi). The SA1 area is part of the larger Maromaku statistical area.

Historical population for Motatau and surrounds
Year	Pop.	±% p.a.
2006	234	—
2013	123	−8.78%
2018	150	+4.05%
2023	135	−2.09%
The 2006 population is for a larger area of 69.55 km^{2} Source:

The SA1 area had a population of 135 in the 2023 New Zealand census, a decrease of 15 people (−10.0%) since the 2018 census, and an increase of 12 people (9.8%) since the 2013 census. There were 69 males, 66 females and 3 people of other genders in 36 dwellings. 2.2% of people identified as LGBTIQ+. The median age was 31.5 years (compared with 38.1 years nationally). There were 45 people (33.3%) aged under 15 years, 21 (15.6%) aged 15 to 29, 48 (35.6%) aged 30 to 64, and 21 (15.6%) aged 65 or older.

People could identify as more than one ethnicity. The results were 28.9% European (Pākehā); 86.7% Māori; 15.6% Pasifika; and 4.4% Middle Eastern, Latin American and African New Zealanders (MELAA). English was spoken by 93.3%, Māori language by 44.4%, Samoan by 2.2%, and other languages by 4.4%. No language could be spoken by 2.2% (e.g. too young to talk). New Zealand Sign Language was known by 2.2%. The percentage of people born overseas was 6.7, compared with 28.8% nationally.

Religious affiliations were 44.4% Christian, 2.2% Islam, 13.3% Māori religious beliefs, 2.2% New Age, and 2.2% other religions. People who answered that they had no religion were 33.3%, and 6.7% of people did not answer the census question.

Of those at least 15 years old, 9 (10.0%) people had a bachelor's or higher degree, 48 (53.3%) had a post-high school certificate or diploma, and 30 (33.3%) people exclusively held high school qualifications. The median income was $33,500, compared with $41,500 nationally. 3 people (3.3%) earned over $100,000 compared to 12.1% nationally. The employment status of those at least 15 was that 42 (46.7%) people were employed full-time, 9 (10.0%) were part-time, and 6 (6.7%) were unemployed.

== Education ==
Motatau School is a decile 3 coeducational primary school serving years 1–8. It has a roll of 62 students as of July 2026. The school opened in 1914.
