= Railway refreshment room =

Railway station catering facility

A railway refreshment room is a catering facility attached to a railway station that was formerly common in Britain, Australia, New Zealand, and other countries that were formerly part of the British Empire. They were opened in the 19th century to serve passengers when trains did not convey catering facilities, and thus served passengers en route. Refreshment rooms were similar to tearooms, and generally served a variety of hot drinks, pastries, cakes, and light meals. With the introduction of buffet and restaurant cars, their importance began to decline.

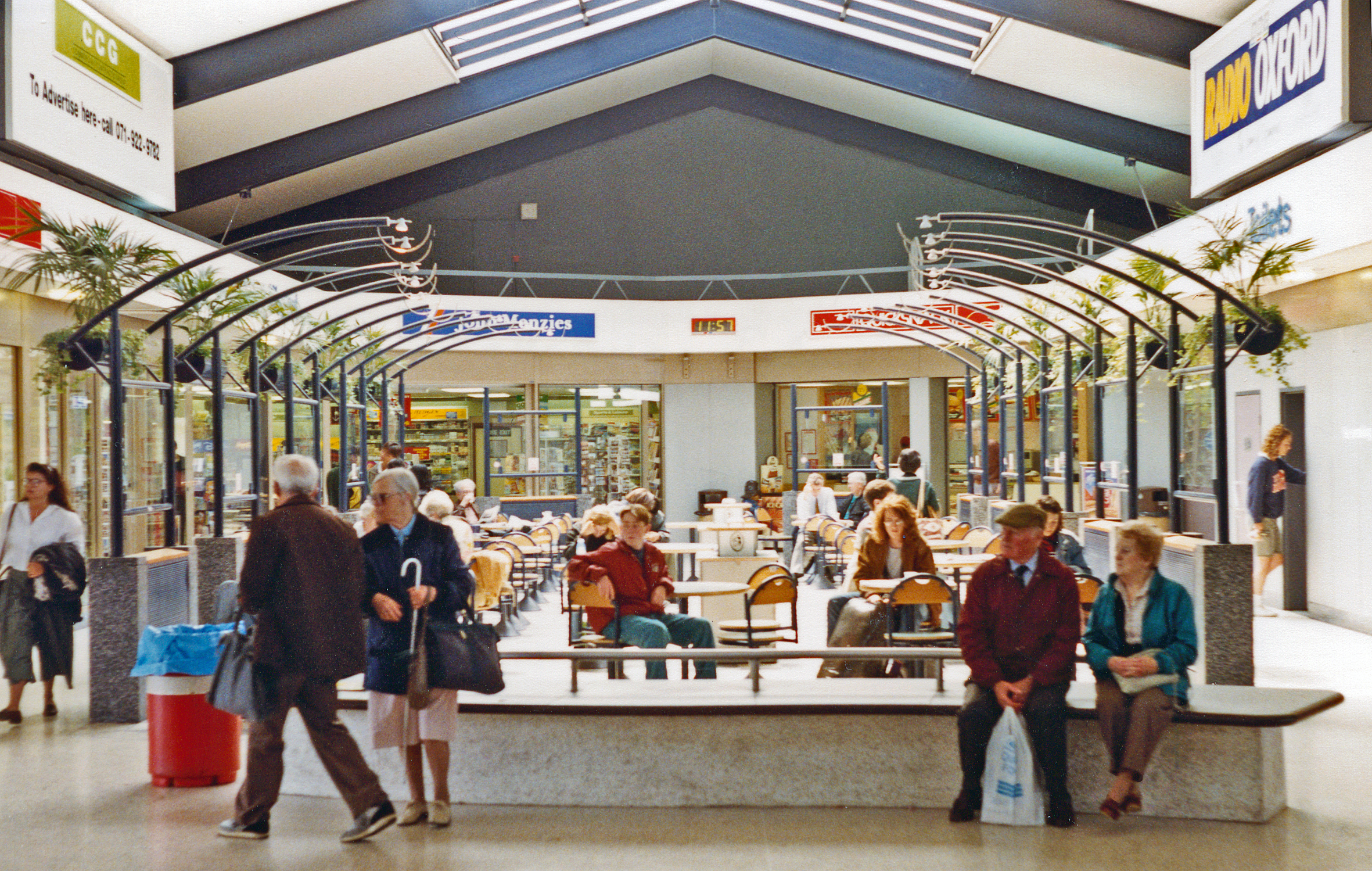
Oxford refreshment room in 1992

== Britain ==
The first railway refreshment rooms opened at Wolverton in November 1840, a year earlier than those at Swindon. Trains stopped for 10 minutes at the station. In 1849 they used 85 pigs for pork pies. The quality of pork pies, sandwiches and tea later came in for criticism.

At the time of the formation of British Railways in 1948, 595 refreshment rooms existed across the United Kingdom.

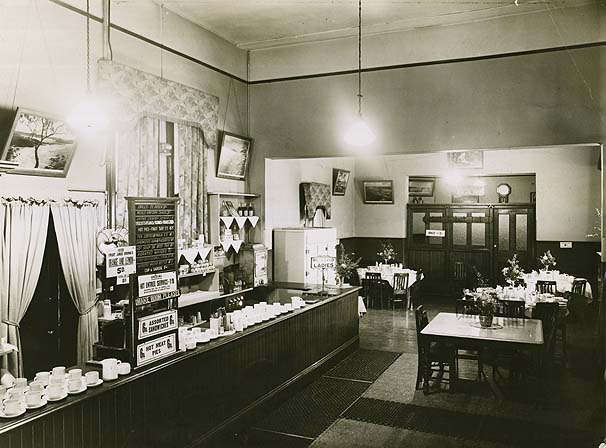
Tamworth refreshment room in 1949

The pivotal scenes in classic 1945 film Brief Encounter takes place within a British railway refreshment room.

== Australia ==
On the Queensland Railways network, the first refreshment room opened at Toowoomba station in 1867. By 1915, there were 47.

== New Zealand ==
The first refreshment room was at the country's first station, Christchurch, which opened in 1863. In 1874 Otago Province passed a law to allow alcohol to be sold. By 1898 there were refreshment rooms at Auckland, Mercer, Te Aute, Waipukurau, Woodville, Kaitoke, Hāwera, Aramoho, Halcombe, Palmerston North, Pātea, Christchurch, Ashburton, Timaru, Oamaru, Palmerston, Dunedin and Clinton. and in 1909 also at Ohakune, Te Kuiti, Marton, Masterton and Totara Flat.

The Refreshment Branch of NZR was set up as a separate unit in August 1917, when NZR took over the rooms of 8 previous lessees. By 1935 NZR had 4 sit-down dining rooms, 18 stalls and 30 counter refreshment rooms. Stations with rooms in the 1930s included Ohakune, Whangārei, Paekakariki, Marton, Palmerston North, Woodville, Waipukurau, Taihape, Mercer, Frankton, Taumarunui, Putāruru, Hāwera, Kaitoke, Pātea, Maungaturoto, Tauranga, Helensville, Paeroa, Masterton, Te Kuiti, Aramoho, Napier, Kaikōura (1944), Waipara, Christchurch, Otira, Ashburton, Oamaru, Palmerston, Dunedin, Milton, Clinton, Gore, and Queenstown. In the late 1940s rooms were converted from table to counter-service to save staff and speed service; for example 600 people were served in 7 minutes at Ashburton. Customer numbers peaked at over 8.5m a year during World War II. Closures then included Marton in 1954, Frankton and Taumarunui in 1975, and Oamaru in 1980. In 1969 rooms remained at Whangārei, Wellsford, Auckland, Frankton, Hamilton, Rotorua, Tauranga, Te Kuiti, Taumarunui, Taihape, Hāwera, Wairoa, Napier, Waipukurau, Palmerston North, Wellington, Masterton, Otiria, Christchurch, Kaikōura, Springfield, Otira, Ashburton, Timaru, Oamaru, Palmerston, Dunedin, Clinton, Stillwater, Ranfurly and Lumsden.

Cafes remain at some stations, such as National Park, Ohakune, Otorohanga and Wellington.

A railway refreshment room is a major part of the New Zealand folk song "Taumarunui on the Main Trunk Line".
