= Okaihau College =

Location
- RD1 Settlers Way, Ōkaihau, Northland, New Zealand; 35.32400°S 173.76600°E

Information
- Type: State Co-Ed Secondary (Year 7–13)
- Motto: "Harmony, Truth and Effort"
- Established: 1973
- Ministry of Education Institution no.: 7
- Principal: Thomas Davison
- Enrolment: 263 (July 2026)
- Socio-economic decile: 2
- Website: okaihau-college.school.nz

In 1973 the Ōkaihau district high school in the Far North District of New Zealand was granted Form 1–7 (Year 7–13) status and became Okaihau College with Mr. Laurenson as first principal. At the same time a full primary school was completed around the Infant Block with Mr. N. Thomson becoming the first headmaster. At the end of 1973 there were 263 pupils attending the college and 219 at the primary school.

Since then, the school has grown to the larger roll of 427 pupils. The decile rating is 2. Students are predominantly of Māori (67%), and European (28%) descent.

The name "Ōkaihau" is a Māori name which means "Feast of the winds", which is relevant to the location of the area on a ridge over 200 m above sea level. This part of New Zealand was originally a dense tree landscape, and even today large old trees such as the puriri are found in the area of the school. The puriri leaves and berries make up the college logo, and the schools motto is "Harmony, Truth and Effort".

Staffing includes approximately 35 teachers and 25 support staff. The curriculum includes all the traditional subject areas up to NCEA Level 3 with an emphasis on performing arts and education out of the classroom. Over 90% of students travel to school by bus, coming from an area bounded by Mangamuka Bridge, Motukiore, Ōhaeawai and Waimate North.
