= Taumarunui (on the Main Trunk Line) =

"Taumarunui (on the Main Trunk Line)" (often styled without parentheses or simply as "Taumarunui") is a New Zealand folk song, written sometime during the 1950s. It is set in the refreshment room at Taumarunui's railway station, which was a major traditional stop for trains running along the North Island Main Trunk railway, lying approximately halfway between Auckland and Wellington. An early publication of the lyrics, as a poem, came in a 1958 edition of The New Zealand Listener. The song is often credited to Peter Cape, whose recording was released in 1957.

== Recordings ==
The song has been something of a standard for New Zealand artists, with numerous recordings over the years. Notable recordings of it include those by Peter Cape, Bushfire, and When the Cat's Been Spayed. Bushfire's 1987 version included guest vocals by leading New Zealand politician (and later Prime Minister) Mike Moore. In 2022, a folk metal version was recorded by Ceolskog.

== See also ==
- List of train songs
