= Kirihi Te Riri Maihi Kawiti =

New Zealand tribal leader (1877–1964)

Kirihi Te Riri Maihi Kawiti OBE (17 April 1877 – 20 February 1964) was a New Zealand tribal leader, farmer and genealogist. Of Māori descent, he identified with the Ngāti Hine hapū of the Ngāpuhi iwi. He was born in Waiomio, Northland, New Zealand, on 17 April 1877. His father was Maihi Paraone Kawiti, a tribal leader.

In the 1949 King's Birthday Honours, Kawiti was appointed an Officer of the Order of the British Empire for services to the Māori people.
