= Okaihau Branch =

Railway branch line in New Zealand

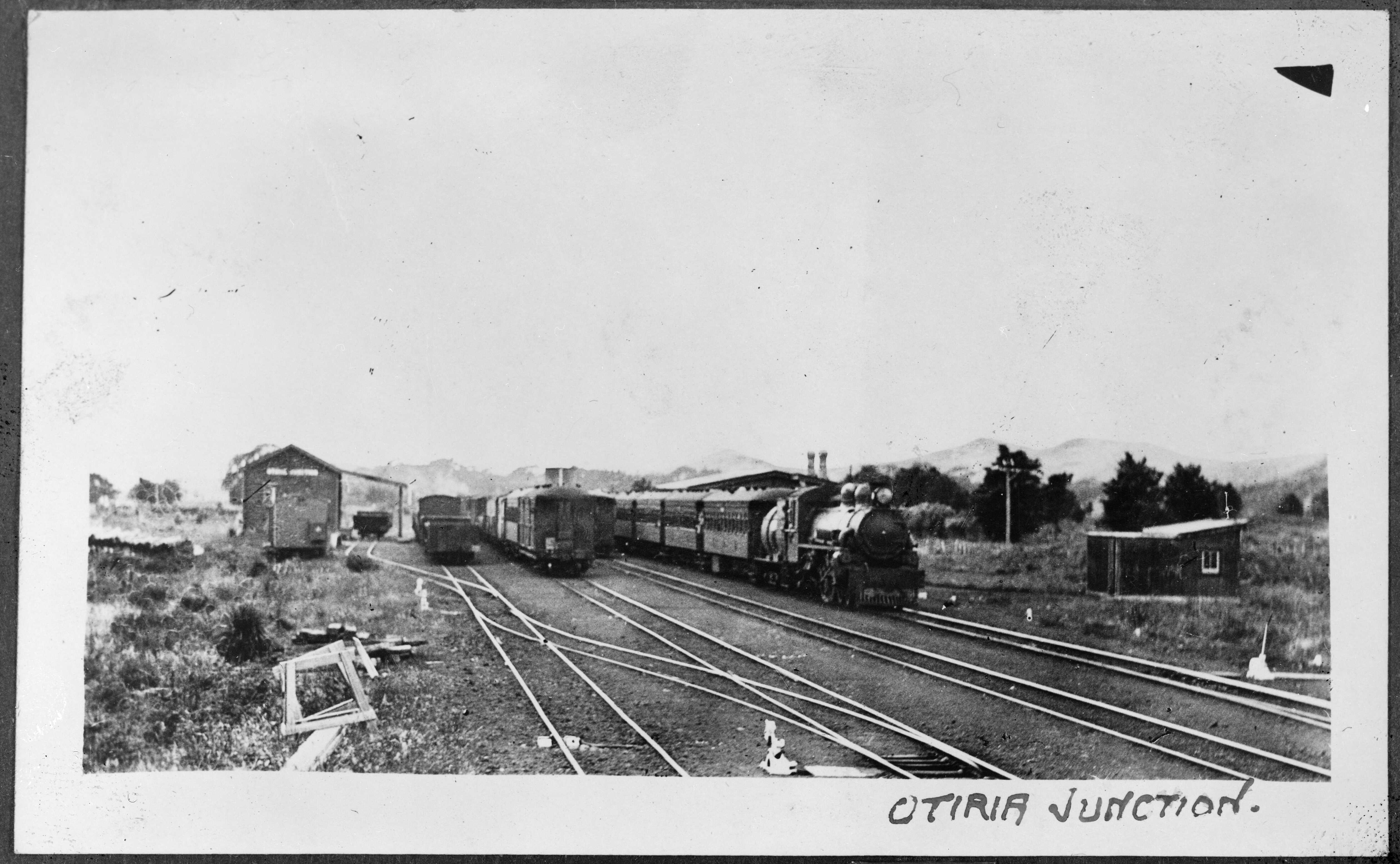
- View of Otiria Junction, showing railway yards, the railway station and several trains

Overview
- Other name(s): Kaikohe Branch; Rangiahua Branch
- Owner: Railways Department
- Locale: Northland, New Zealand
- Termini: Otiria; Ōkaihau
- Stations: 8

Service
- Type: Heavy rail
- System: New Zealand Government Railways (NZGR)
- Operator: Railways Department

History
- Opened: 1 May 1914
- Complete to Ōkaihau: 29 October 1923
- Closed to Passengers: 21 July 1976
- Closed: 1 November 1987

Technical
- Line length: 40.00 km (24.85 mi)
- Track length: 61.29 km (38.08 mi)
- Num of tracks: Single
- Character: Rural
- Track gauge: 3 ft 6 in (1,067 mm)

Map

The Okaihau Branch, sometimes known as the Kaikohe Branch and rarely the Rangiahua Branch, was a branch line railway that joined the North Auckland Line of the national rail network of New Zealand at Otiria. It was the most northerly line in New Zealand and was intended to run all the way to Kaitaia. It opened to Ōkaihau in 1923 and closed in 1987.

== Construction ==
Proposals for a railway line to Kaitaia and the Far North existed as early as the 1870s, but it was not until 1909 that preliminary surveys were conducted. After the North Auckland Line was linked to and extended over the Opua Branch in 1911, construction progressed in earnest from Otiria towards Kaikohe: initial work had been undertaken in 1910. On 1 May 1914, this section opened. A small amount of further construction took place over the next two years, but World War I meant that no work took place between 1916 and 1919. The resumption of work led to the completion of the line to Ōkaihau on 29 October 1923.

Debate raged over what route to follow to Kaitaia. The proposal was to run from Ōkaihau to Rangiahua, near the Hokianga Harbour, and then either through the Maungataniwha Range, about 30 kilometres (19 mi) long with two tunnels; or skirting the range, roughly ten kilometres (6.2 mi) longer with no tunnels. A 1921 commission did not support work beyond Ōkaihau, but a compromise in 1923 established Rangiahua as the northern terminus and the Public Works Department continued to build northwards, albeit slowly.

Due to the Great Depression construction of the line beyond Ōkaihau was abandoned in 1931. The Rangiahua section was essentially complete: the line wound downhill to the settlement and a station yard complete with platform was built, though the station building itself was not erected. Following a change in government in 1935, a 1936 review of the work beyond Ōkaihau was undertaken, and the decision was made not to extend the line to Kaitaia. The steep route to Rangiahua was not seen as being particularly useful and had been plagued by slips. The line was accordingly terminated in Okaihau, which was on the main State Highway north (SH1). During 1938 and World War II the abandoned trackage was salvaged, sometimes by bullock teams, for use elsewhere, especially the Dargaville Branch.

== Stations ==
These stations were on the Okaihau Branch. The extension to Rangiahua is not included, as it never saw regular service.

Station	km	Closed
Otiria to Kaikohe (opened May 1, 1914)
Otiria	0	August 31, 2016
Kawiti	5	January 27, 1974
Cameron's Crossing	7	January 28, 1974
Ngapipito	10	January 27, 1974
Rakautao	17	January 27, 1974
Ngapuhi	22	January 27, 1974
Kaikohe	26	November 1, 1987
Kaikohe to Okaihau (opened October 29, 1923)
Lake Omapere road crossing	35	January 27, 1974
Okaihau	40	November 1, 1987

Notes:

- A ballast pit was located near Kawiti.
- Engine sheds were located at Kaikohe (closed 1930) and Okaihau.

== Operation ==
Although Kaikohe has become established as the service centre of the Far North, it failed to generate much rail traffic in the early years of the line. During the first ten months of existence, just 1,500 tons of inbound freight was carried, with roughly half that carried outbound; the decline continued to the point that in 1918 Kaikohe lost its stationmaster. Minimal services were offered, and although losses increased up to 1930, fortunes had somewhat improved by 1940, and by 1950 there was sufficient traffic to justify six trains each way a week. Two carried solely freight, while four were mixed trains, also carrying passengers. Full complements of staff were employed at Kaikohe and Ōkaihau, where a locomotive depot was located.

When railcars were introduced on services north of Auckland in November 1956, they ran all the way to Ōkaihau. Previously, a carriage train known as the Northland Express (or the Opua Express) had run from Auckland to Opua with connections to Okaihau via the mixed trains, but with the change of the northern terminus to Ōkaihau, the branch increased in importance. This proved to be short-lived as the railcar service was withdrawn in July 1967 due to mechanical problems plaguing the 88-seater railcars. Passengers had to use the mixed trains, with significantly older rolling stock on a slower schedule, and demand slipped. The branch closed to passengers on 21 June 1976.

In 1977, a relaxation of road transport laws led to a decline in freight traffic on the line and forestry proposals that would have required a railway service failed to eventuate. Scheduled trains were cancelled on 12 August 1983, and for a little over four years the line was shunted when required. The branch closed on 1 November 1987.

== Today ==
After the line's closure, the New Zealand Railways Corporation retained ownership over the trackbed in the hopes that forestry proposals would come to fruition, and some rails were still in place during the 1990s. In most places track and bridges have been removed, though evidence of the bridge piles and ballast remain. A loading bank and rails under a loading chute exist in Kaikohe, and in Ōkaihau, the flat area of the yard, the tunnel leading to Rangiahua and the platform are very apparent. For much of the line's length, its formation is quite obvious and includes embankments and cuttings. At Rangiahua State Highway 1 is where the rails used to be, with a loading bank to the west and a platform to the east. The corridor is still owned by the Railways Corporation.

=== Pou Herenga Tai – Twin Coast Cycle Trail ===
A proposal was made by the Kaikohe Rau Marama Community Trust to convert the trackbed between Ōkaihau and Kaikohe into a walking and cycling track, much like the Otago Central Rail Trail and the Little River Rail Trail in the South Island. This was to be the first step in a plan to establish a rail trail through to the Bay of Islands Vintage Railway in Kawakawa.

14 km (8.7 mi) of the line was opened in 2013 as the first part of the 87 km (54 mi) Twin Coast Cycle Trail from Opua to Horeke, which opened fully in 2017.

== Cultural references ==
Folk singer Peter Cape wrote and sang his song The Okaihau Express in the 1950s about the Ōkaihau train, which consisted of a steam engine, a carriage and a guards van. This song was also featured in Season 5, Episode 2 of popular streaming show Jet Lag: The Game, in which contestants Ben and Adam had to memorize and sing the entire song’s lyrics without making a mistake in order to progress in the game (a race from the northernmost to southernmost points in New Zealand). A rock cover of the song was featured in the end credits of the season on Nebula to pay tribute to the iconic moment of the show.

== Gallery ==
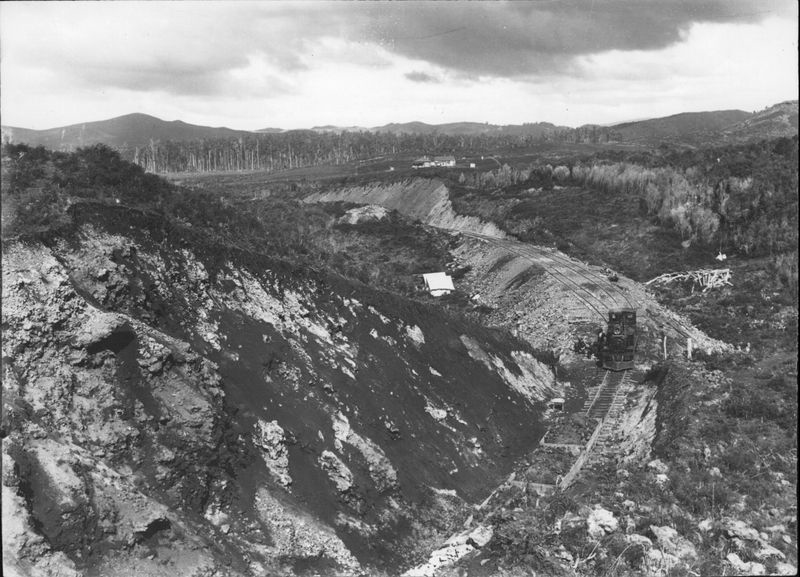
A ballast train during the construction of the Okaihau Branch in 1911

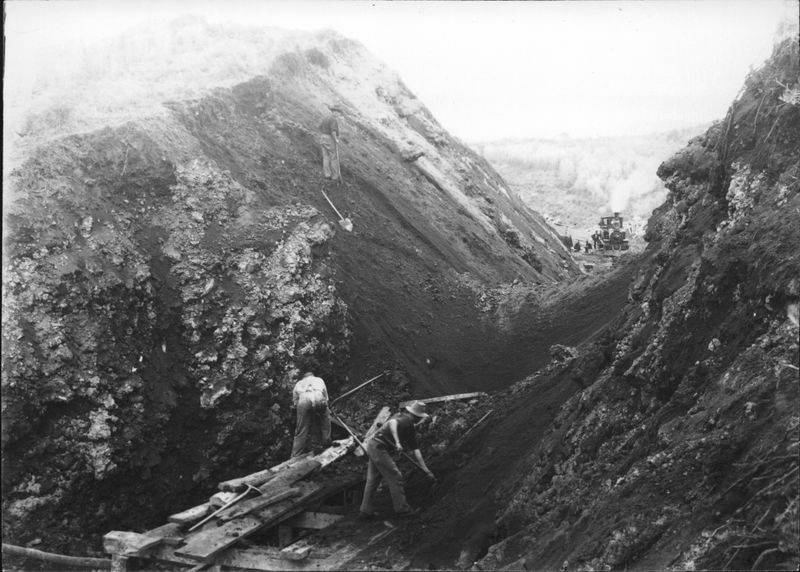
Cutting a hill during the construction of the Okaihau Branch in 1911

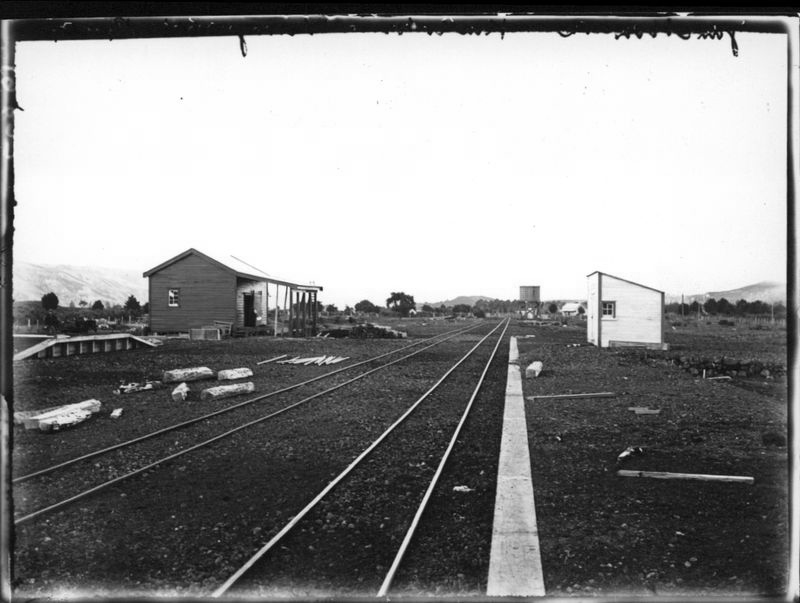
Otiria railway station in 1911

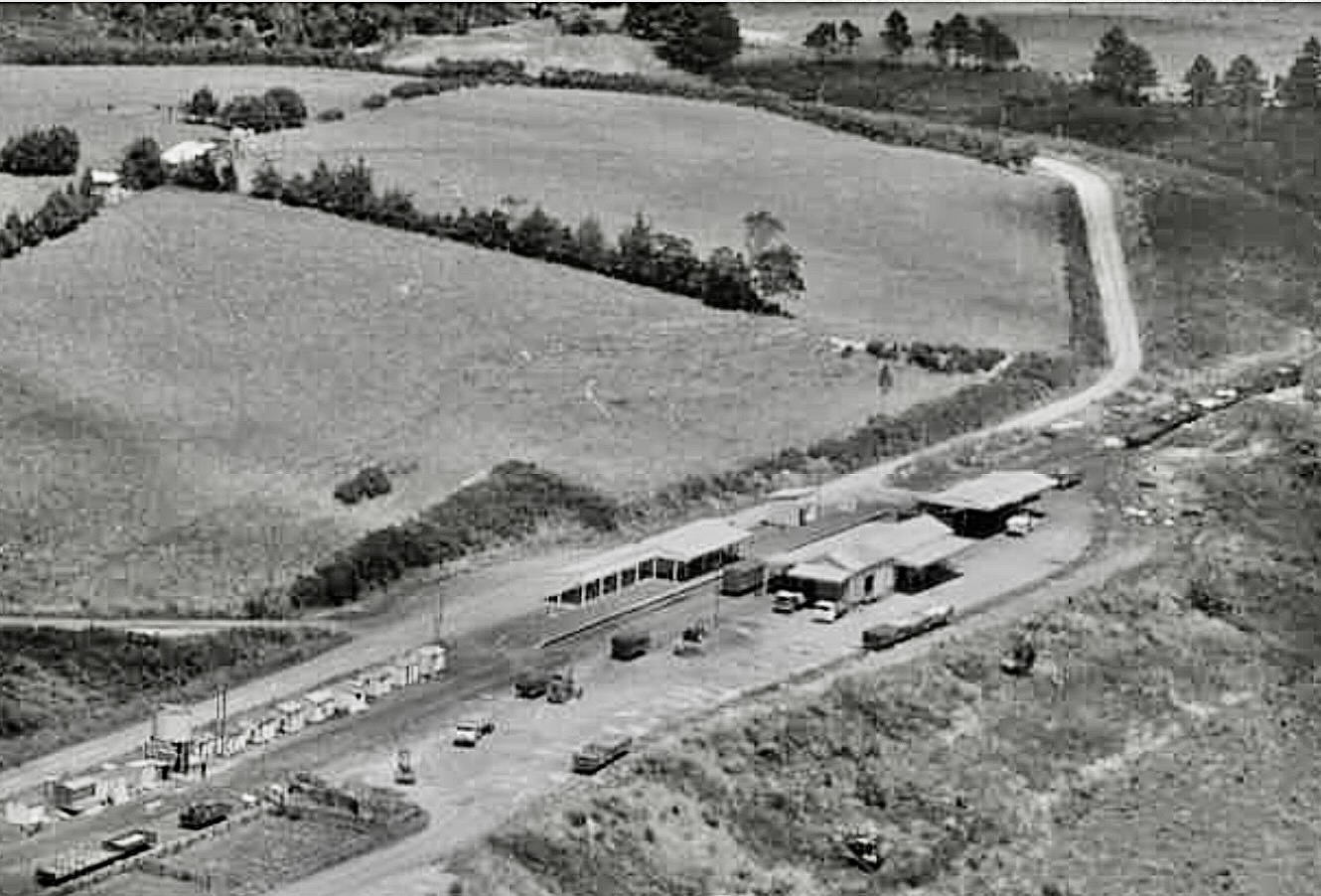
Okaihau railway station in 1966

== See also ==
- Donnellys Crossing Section/Branch
- Marsden Point Branch
- Onerahi Branch
