= Todd Miller (rugby union) =

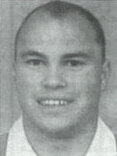
- Miller in 1997
- Born: Todd James Miller; 2 December 1974 (age 51) Whangārei, New Zealand
- Height: 1.75 m (5 ft 9 in)
- Weight: 81 kg (179 lb)
- School: Kamo High School
- University: University of Waikato
- Notable relative(s): Sid Going (uncle); Ken Going (uncle)

Rugby union career
- Position: Full-back
Provincial / State sides
Years	Team	Apps	(Points)
1993–2004	Waikato	84	(145)
Super Rugby
Years	Team	Apps	(Points)
1998–2004	Chiefs	41	(30)
International career
Years	Team	Apps	(Points)
1994	New Zealand Colts	1	(0)
1997	New Zealand	0	(0)
1999	New Zealand Māori	1	(0)

Todd James Miller (born 2 December 1974) is a former New Zealand rugby union player. A full-back, Miller represented Waikato at a provincial level and the Chiefs in Super Rugby. He was a member of the New Zealand national side, the All Blacks, on the 1997 Tour of Britain and Ireland and played four matches but no internationals.
