= Peter Cape =

New Zealand singer (1926–1979)

Peter Irwin Cape
- Born: 19 January 1926; Helensville, New Zealand
- Died: 30 May 1979 (aged 53) Richmond, New Zealand
- Occupations: Singer, songwriter, writer, radio producer

Peter Irwin Cape (19 January 1926 – 30 May 1979) was a New Zealand singer, songwriter, writer and radio producer. He is best remembered for his simple folk songs, including "Taumarunui (on the Main Trunk Line)", "She'll Be Right", and "Coffee Bar Blues".

== Early life ==
Cape was born in Helensville, north-west of Auckland. He was educated by Correspondence School, and in the 1940s he went on to study for a Bachelor of Arts in English, philosophy and psychology at The University of Auckland, where he was the Craccum editor for part of 1948, and then 1949. After graduating, he worked for a time as a freelance journalist.

== Career ==
In the 1950s, Cape undertook theological studies at Selwyn College, after which he was ordained as an Anglican priest. He subsequently took a job as talks producer for the New Zealand Broadcasting Service. His first songs were recorded in 1958. He is best remembered for his songs "Taumarunui On The Main Trunk Line", "She'll Be Right" and "Coffee Bar Blues". His music is often seen as capturing a deliberately rural and disconnected side of New Zealand that was not shown by contemporary artists, with most music performed in New Zealand during his career being covers, or otherwise heavily influenced by international trends.

In 1963, he was promoted to director of religious and arts programmes at the New Zealand Broadcasting Service. In the 1960s, Cape also served as the Director of Volunteer Service Abroad. In later life Cape authored a number of books on New Zealand's contemporary visual arts and fine artists. He also wrote an autobiography, titled An Ordinary Joker.

== Personal life ==
In 1952, he married Barbara Henderson. The marriage ended in divorce in the 1970s. He lived in Richmond until his death 1979 at the age of 53. His ashes were buried in Kaukapakapa, near his birthplace, in 2019.

== Discography ==
A selection of Cape's recordings are listed below:

- All Black Jerseys
- Black Matai
- Bullocky
- Charlie's Bash
- Coffee-Bar Blues
- Down the Hall on Saturday Night
- Feet Fish
- Fetch 'Em On
- Gumdigger
- I Don't Want To Be a Kiwi
- Inter-Island steamer Express
- May, The Drover's Daughter
- Nativity (New Zealand Christmas)
- Okaihau Express
- Old Joe Becher and Young Joe Bayer
- Poor Unfortunate Boy
- Pussycat
- Rainbird
- Scotty The Roadman
- She'll Be Right
- She's A Great Little Town
- Spell-Oh!
- Talking Dog
- Taumarunui (on the Main Trunk Line)
- Taumatawhakatangihangakoauauotamateaturipukakapikimaungahoronukupokaiwhenuakitanatahu
- The Monde Marie
- The Stable Lad
- The Swagger
- Tramcar
- You Can't Win
