= Moerewa =

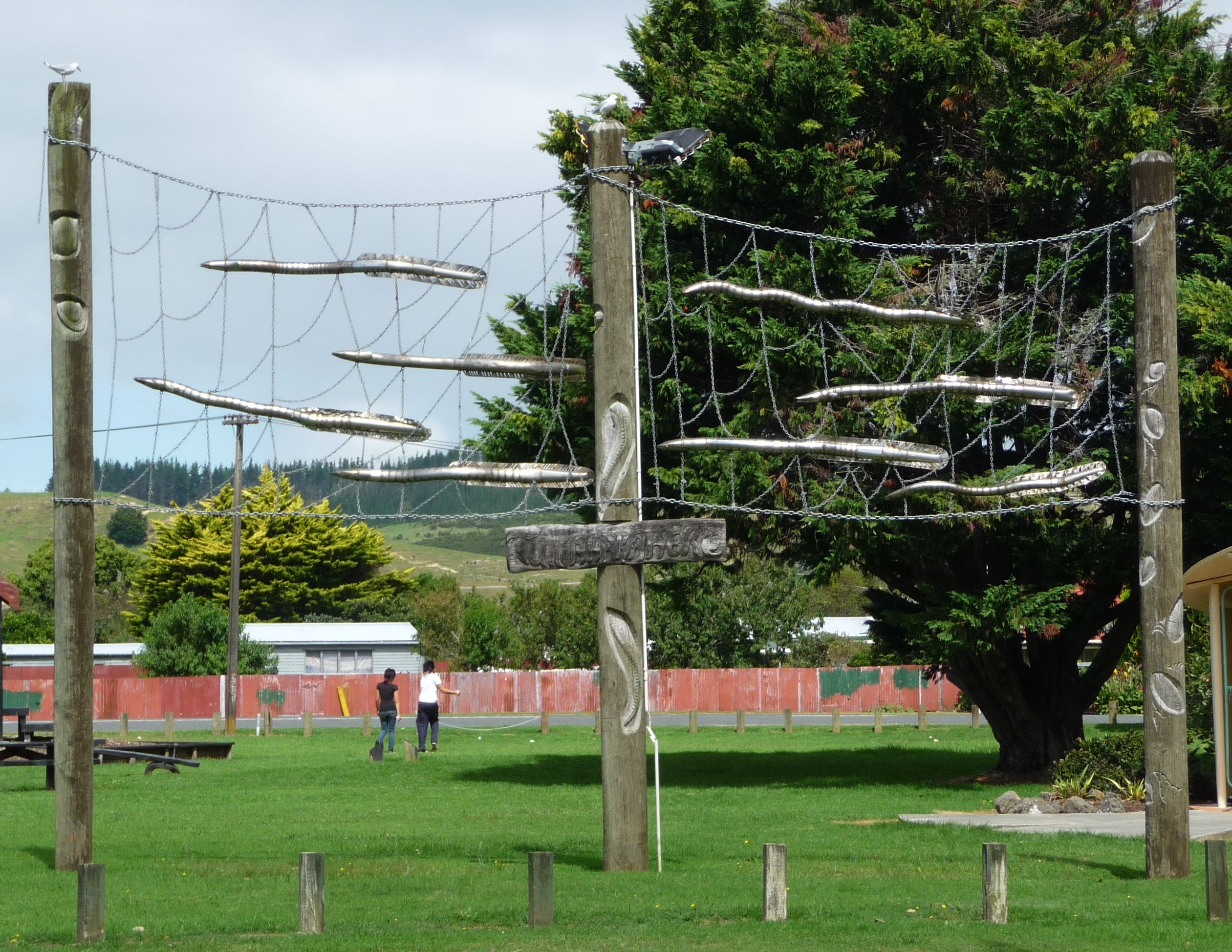
- Eel sculpture at Moerewa
- Interactive map of Moerewa
- Coordinates: 35°23′9″S 174°1′11″E
- Country: New Zealand
- Region: Northland Region
- District: Far North District
- Ward: Bay of Islands-Whangaroa Ward
- Community: Bay of Islands-Whangaroa
- Subdivision: Kawakawa-Moerewa
- Electorates: Northland; Te Tai Tokerau

Government
  - Territorial Authority: Far North District Council
  - Regional council: Northland Regional Council
  - Mayor of Far North: Moko Tepania
  - Northland MP: Grant McCallum
  - Te Tai Tokerau MP: TBD

Area
  - Total: 4.26 km^{2} (1.64 sq mi)

Population (June 2025)
  - Total: 1,930
  - Density: 453/km^{2} (1,170/sq mi)
- Postcode(s): 0211

Moerewa is a small town in the Northland Region of the North Island of New Zealand. It is located close to the Bay of Islands five kilometres to the west of Kawakawa.

Moerewa is a service town for the surrounding farming industry. Its main industry is the freezing works. During the economic slump of the 1980s, many of the town's industries were badly affected, and unemployment soared.

== Demographics ==
Moerewa covers 4.26 km^{2} (1.64 sq mi) and had an estimated population of 1,930 as of June 2025, with a population density of 453 people per km^{2}.

Historical population
Year	Pop.	±% p.a.
2006	1,410	—
2013	1,398	−0.12%
2018	1,737	+4.44%
2023	1,845	+1.21%
The 2006 population is for a smaller area of 1.88 km^{2} Source:

Moerewa had a population of 1,845 in the 2023 New Zealand census, an increase of 108 people (6.2%) since the 2018 census, and an increase of 447 people (32.0%) since the 2013 census. There were 906 males, 933 females and 3 people of other genders in 462 dwellings. 1.8% of people identified as LGBTIQ+. The median age was 29.6 years (compared with 38.1 years nationally). There were 522 people (28.3%) aged under 15 years, 408 (22.1%) aged 15 to 29, 714 (38.7%) aged 30 to 64, and 198 (10.7%) aged 65 or older.

People could identify as more than one ethnicity. The results were 23.3% European (Pākehā); 92.2% Māori; 7.3% Pasifika; 2.0% Asian; 0.2% Middle Eastern, Latin American and African New Zealanders (MELAA); and 0.2% other, which includes people giving their ethnicity as "New Zealander". English was spoken by 94.1%, Māori language by 34.3%, Samoan by 0.3%, and other languages by 1.3%. No language could be spoken by 3.6% (e.g. too young to talk). New Zealand Sign Language was known by 1.0%. The percentage of people born overseas was 5.5, compared with 28.8% nationally.

Religious affiliations were 33.5% Christian, 0.3% Hindu, 0.5% Islam, 13.7% Māori religious beliefs, 0.3% New Age, and 0.8% other religions. People who answered that they had no religion were 42.9%, and 8.3% of people did not answer the census question.

Of those at least 15 years old, 72 (5.4%) people had a bachelor's or higher degree, 771 (58.3%) had a post-high school certificate or diploma, and 471 (35.6%) people exclusively held high school qualifications. The median income was $28,800, compared with $41,500 nationally. 24 people (1.8%) earned over $100,000 compared to 12.1% nationally. The employment status of those at least 15 was that 534 (40.4%) people were employed full-time, 144 (10.9%) were part-time, and 123 (9.3%) were unemployed.

== Marae ==
Moerewa has two Ngāpuhi marae:

- Tereawatea Marae and meeting house are affiliated with Ngāti Hine.
- Te Rito Marae and meeting house are affiliated with Ngāti Hine.

In October 2020, the Government committed $362,468 from the Provincial Growth Fund to upgrade Te Rito Marae, creating 10 jobs.

== Education ==
Moerewa School is a coeducational full primary (years 1–8) school with a roll of 131 students as of July 2026. Moerewa School opened in 1913, and merged with Otiria School at the beginning of 2005.

Te Kura Kaupapa Māori o Taumarere is a coeducational composite (years 1–13) school with a roll of 126 students as of July 2026. It is a Kura Kaupapa Māori school which teaches fully in the Māori language. The school was largely destroyed in an arson attack on 23 March 2008. Prefab buildings were used to keep the school running and a new block was built in 2010. A substantial redevelopment began in 2016.

== Transport ==
Moerewa is on State Highway 1.

Moerewa was formerly served by the Opua Branch of the North Auckland Line railway. The line was originally built to link the Bay of Islands with Whangārei, and the complete route opened on 13 April 1911. From December 1925 until November 1956, the Northland Express train ran through Moerewa, providing a direct service to Auckland. After it ceased to run, passengers were served by mixed trains between Opua and Whangārei until 18 July 1976. In 1985, freight services ceased and the line from Moerewa to Kawakawa was dismantled. The line from Otiria, the present northern terminus, to Moerewa remains in place but is disused.
