= Otiria =

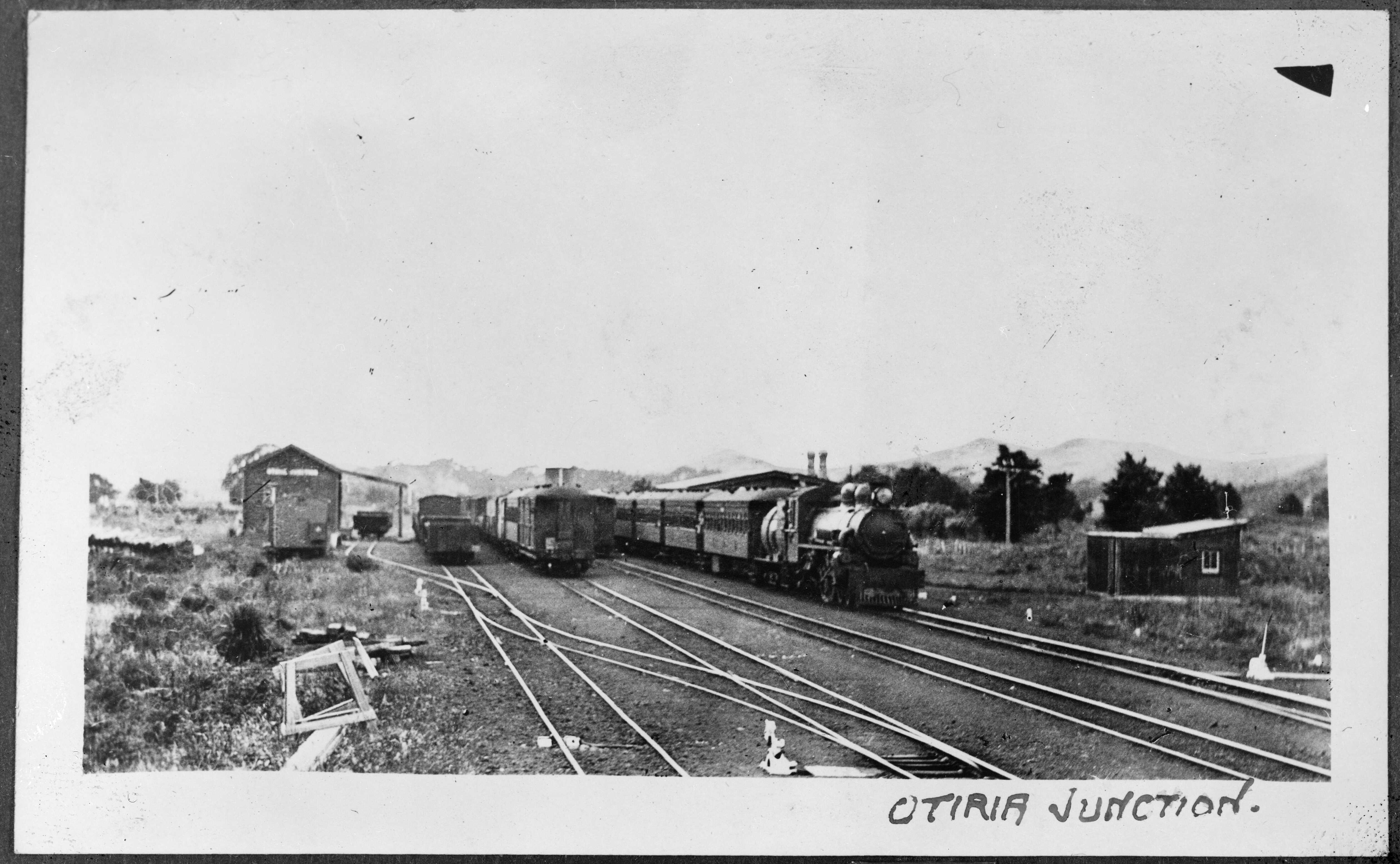
- Otiria Junction showing railway yards, the railway station, and several trains, 1930s

- Location within Northland Region
- Coordinates: 35°23′54″S 174°0′1″E
- Country: New Zealand
- Region: Northland Region
- District: Far North District
- Postcode: 0281

Otiria is a rural locality in the Northland Region of New Zealand's North Island. It neighbours Moerewa to the east, with the nearest major town, Kawakawa a few kilometres further eastwards. Other nearby localities include Pokapu to the south, Orauta to the west, and Hupara to the north.

The New Zealand Ministry for Culture and Heritage gives a translation of "place of planting" for Ōtiria.

== Education ==
Otiria used to have a primary school. It was closed in 2005 and students were transferred to Moerewa School.

== Transportation ==
Otiria is situated just off State Highway 1.

Otiria is the northernmost operational point of the national railway network. It is the terminus of the North Auckland Line, although a disused siding extends into Moerewa. Otiria railway station (closed in 1993) was a railway junction until the mid-1980s. The Opua Branch section of the North Auckland Line ran northeast to Kawakawa and Opua, while the Okaihau Branch ran northwest to Kaikohe and Ōkaihau. The railway through Otiria was built in the early 20th century to connect Opua and Kawakawa with Whangārei; the through route opened on 13 April 1911. This was quickly followed by the commencement of work on the Okaihau Branch from Otiria; it opened to Kaikohe in May 1914 and Ōkaihau in October 1923.

In December 1925, passenger trains offering direct service to and from Auckland began running through Otiria. This was initially the Northland Express between Auckland and Opua, with carriages for Ōkaihau detached in Otiria. It was cancelled in November 1956 and replaced by 88 seater railcars that ran between Auckland and Ōkaihau. Due to declining patronage and the poor reliability of the railcars, this service ended in July 1967. Mixed trains to Whangarei continued to operate; the final passenger service through Otiria ran on 18 June 1976. The line from Otiria to Opua ceased to be used in 1985, and when the Okaihau Branch closed on 1 November 1987, Otiria became the northernmost locality served by rail in New Zealand. In 2007, one freight train was timetabled to operate every weekday each way between Otiria and Whangarei. The line was mothballed in August 2016. As of March, 2019, a possible re-opening of all or part of the Whangarei to Otiria line for freight only is under consideration. In January 2020 the Government announced the reopening and building of a container terminal as part of a $109.7 million investment in Northland rail.
