= Maromaku =

- Interactive map of Maromaku
- Coordinates: 35°28′50″S 174°5′46″E
- Country: New Zealand
- Region: Northland Region
- District: Far North District
- Ward: Bay of Islands-Whangaroa Ward
- Community: Bay of Islands-Whangaroa
- Subdivision: Russell-Ōpua
- Electorates: Northland; Te Tai Tokerau

Government
  - Territorial Authority: Far North District Council
  - Regional council: Northland Regional Council
  - Mayor of Far North: Moko Tepania
  - Northland MP: Grant McCallum
  - Te Tai Tokerau MP: Mariameno Kapa-Kingi

Maromaku is a locality in the Northland Region of the North Island of New Zealand. Kawakawa is north, and Towai is southeast. State Highway 1 runs past Maromaku to the north, and the North Auckland Line runs through it.

== Demographics ==
The Maromaku locality is in an SA1 statistical area which covers 46.27 km^{2} (17.86 sq mi). The SA1 area is part of the larger Maromaku statistical area.

Historical population for the locality
Year	Pop.	±% p.a.
2006	174	—
2013	150	−2.10%
2018	162	+1.55%
2023	189	+3.13%

The SA1 statistical area had a population of 189 in the 2023 New Zealand census, an increase of 27 people (16.7%) since the 2018 census, and an increase of 39 people (26.0%) since the 2013 census. There were 90 males and 96 females in 57 dwellings. 1.6% of people identified as LGBTIQ+. The median age was 36.1 years (compared with 38.1 years nationally). There were 51 people (27.0%) aged under 15 years, 30 (15.9%) aged 15 to 29, 78 (41.3%) aged 30 to 64, and 30 (15.9%) aged 65 or older.

People could identify as more than one ethnicity. The results were 77.8% European (Pākehā); 49.2% Māori; 9.5% Pasifika; 1.6% Asian; and 3.2% Middle Eastern, Latin American and African New Zealanders (MELAA). English was spoken by 95.2%, Māori language by 11.1%, Samoan by 1.6%, and other languages by 1.6%. No language could be spoken by 3.2% (e.g. too young to talk). New Zealand Sign Language was known by 3.2%. The percentage of people born overseas was 6.3, compared with 28.8% nationally.

Religious affiliations were 42.9% Christian. People who answered that they had no religion were 52.4%, and 6.3% of people did not answer the census question.

Of those at least 15 years old, 9 (6.5%) people had a bachelor's or higher degree, 99 (71.7%) had a post-high school certificate or diploma, and 30 (21.7%) people exclusively held high school qualifications. The median income was $32,300, compared with $41,500 nationally. 6 people (4.3%) earned over $100,000 compared to 12.1% nationally. The employment status of those at least 15 was that 66 (47.8%) people were employed full-time, 18 (13.0%) were part-time, and 6 (4.3%) were unemployed.

=== Maromaku statistical area ===
The statistical area of Maromaku, which also includes Motatau and Towai, covers 238.34 km^{2} (92.02 sq mi) and had an estimated population of 860 as of June 2025, with a population density of 3.6 people per km^{2}.

Historical population for the statistical area
Year	Pop.	±% p.a.
2006	714	—
2013	666	−0.99%
2018	774	+3.05%
2023	846	+1.79%

Maromaku statistical area had a population of 846 in the 2023 New Zealand census, an increase of 72 people (9.3%) since the 2018 census, and an increase of 180 people (27.0%) since the 2013 census. There were 420 males, 423 females and 3 people of other genders in 261 dwellings. 1.8% of people identified as LGBTIQ+. The median age was 33.2 years (compared with 38.1 years nationally). There were 228 people (27.0%) aged under 15 years, 150 (17.7%) aged 15 to 29, 339 (40.1%) aged 30 to 64, and 129 (15.2%) aged 65 or older.

People could identify as more than one ethnicity. The results were 70.9% European (Pākehā); 50.7% Māori; 6.4% Pasifika; 1.4% Asian; 2.8% Middle Eastern, Latin American and African New Zealanders (MELAA); and 4.3% other, which includes people giving their ethnicity as "New Zealander". English was spoken by 95.4%, Māori language by 14.2%, Samoan by 0.4%, and other languages by 3.9%. No language could be spoken by 3.2% (e.g. too young to talk). New Zealand Sign Language was known by 1.1%. The percentage of people born overseas was 8.5, compared with 28.8% nationally.

Religious affiliations were 34.4% Christian, 0.4% Islam, 3.2% Māori religious beliefs, 0.4% Buddhist, 0.4% New Age, and 0.4% other religions. People who answered that they had no religion were 53.2%, and 8.2% of people did not answer the census question.

Of those at least 15 years old, 51 (8.3%) people had a bachelor's or higher degree, 399 (64.6%) had a post-high school certificate or diploma, and 153 (24.8%) people exclusively held high school qualifications. The median income was $32,100, compared with $41,500 nationally. 24 people (3.9%) earned over $100,000 compared to 12.1% nationally. The employment status of those at least 15 was that 294 (47.6%) people were employed full-time, 102 (16.5%) were part-time, and 21 (3.4%) were unemployed.

== Education ==
Maromaku School is a coeducational primary school (years 1-8) with a roll of 31 students as of March 2026. A school first opened in Maromaku in 1891. Towai Primary School closed in January 2005, with students moving to Maromaku School.
