= Towai =

Tōwai
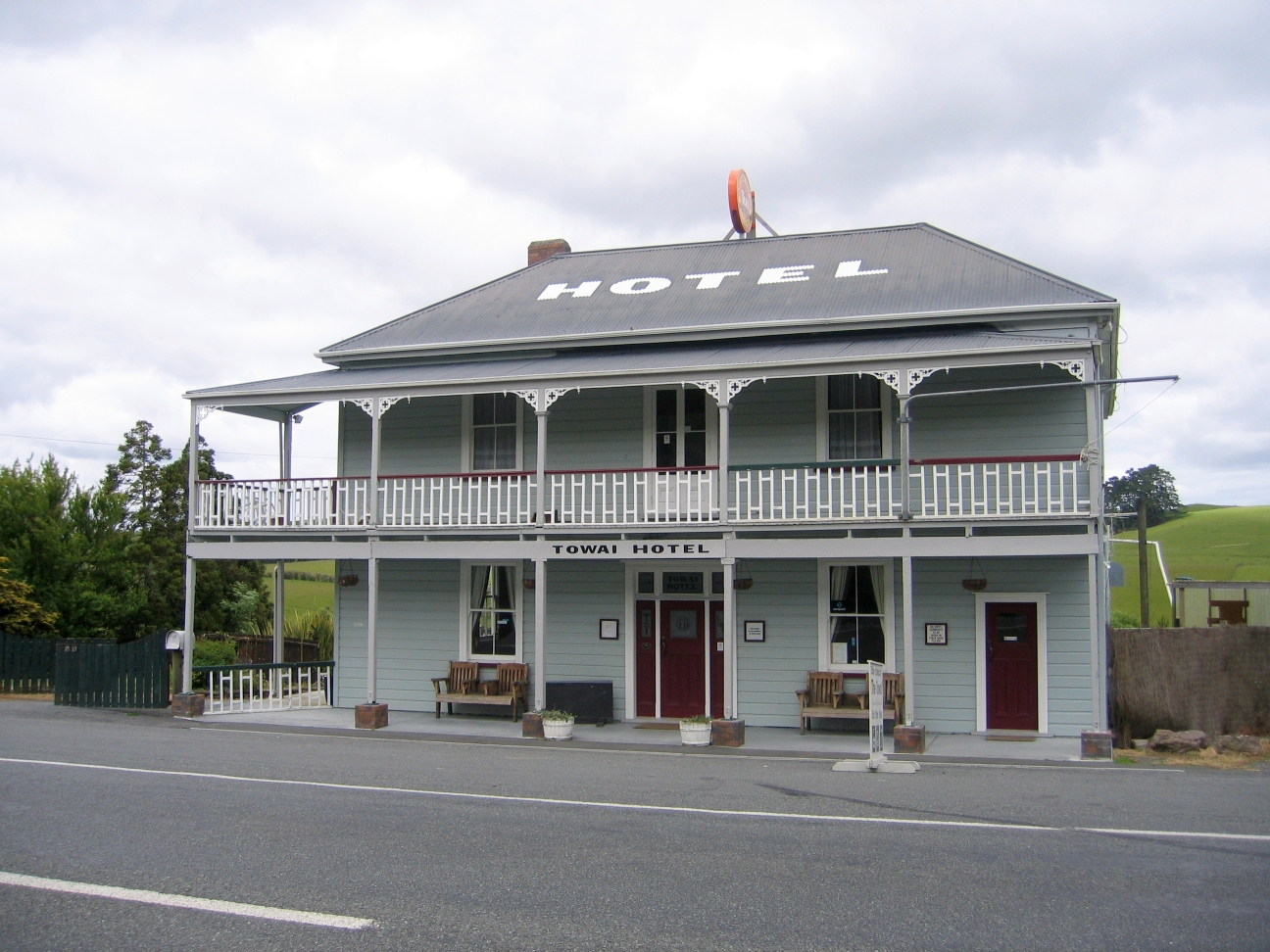
- Towai Tavern
- Interactive map of Tōwai
- Coordinates: 35°29′40″S 174°7′54″E
- Country: New Zealand
- Region: Northland Region
- District: Far North District
- Ward: Bay of Islands-Whangaroa Ward
- Community: Bay of Islands-Whangaroa
- Subdivision: Russell-Ōpua
- Electorates: Northland; Te Tai Tokerau

Government
  - Territorial Authority: Far North District Council
  - Regional council: Northland Regional Council
  - Mayor of Far North: Moko Tepania
  - Northland MP: Grant McCallum
  - Te Tai Tokerau MP: TBD

Tōwai (formerly spelled Towai) is a locality in the Northland Region of the North Island of New Zealand. State Highway 1 passes through it. Kawakawa is 16 km northwest, and Whakapara is 17 km southeast. The North Auckland Line passes through Tōwai.

Towai Primary School closed in January 2005, with students moving to Maromaku School.

In 2026, the spelling of the locality's name was officially altered from Towai to Tōwai.

== Demographics ==
Tōwai is in two SA1 statistical areas that cover 40.27 km^{2} (15.55 sq mi). The SA1 areas are part of the larger Maromaku statistical area.

Historical population for the SA1 statistical areas
Year	Pop.	±% p.a.
2013	210	—
2018	237	+2.45%
2023	279	+3.32%

The SA1 statistical areas had a population of 279 in the 2023 New Zealand census, an increase of 42 people (17.7%) since the 2018 census, and an increase of 69 people (32.9%) since the 2013 census. There were 132 males and 144 females in 84 dwellings. 2.2% of people identified as LGBTIQ+. There were 69 people (24.7%) aged under 15 years, 57 (20.4%) aged 15 to 29, 120 (43.0%) aged 30 to 64, and 33 (11.8%) aged 65 or older.

People could identify as more than one ethnicity. The results were 73.1% European (Pākehā); 47.3% Māori; 3.2% Pasifika; 3.2% Asian; 5.4% Middle Eastern, Latin American and African New Zealanders (MELAA); and 6.5% other, which includes people giving their ethnicity as "New Zealander". English was spoken by 94.6%, Māori language by 11.8%, and other languages by 6.5%. No language could be spoken by 2.2% (e.g. too young to talk). The percentage of people born overseas was 9.7, compared with 28.8% nationally.

Religious affiliations were 35.5% Christian, and 1.1% Māori religious beliefs. People who answered that they had no religion were 51.6%, and 10.8% of people did not answer the census question.

Of those at least 15 years old, 21 (10.0%) people had a bachelor's or higher degree, 141 (67.1%) had a post-high school certificate or diploma, and 42 (20.0%) people exclusively held high school qualifications. 9 people (4.3%) earned over $100,000 compared to 12.1% nationally. The employment status of those at least 15 was that 105 (50.0%) people were employed full-time, 30 (14.3%) were part-time, and 6 (2.9%) were unemployed.
