= Northland Express =

Former passenger service in New Zealand

The Northland Express, also known as the Opua Express, was an express passenger train operated by the New Zealand Railways Department between 29 November 1925 and 12 November 1956. It ran from Auckland via Whangārei to Opua in the Bay of Islands.

== Operation ==
On 29 November 1925, the North Auckland Line linking Auckland to Whangarei and other parts of Northland was completed. Soon after passenger expresses began to operate, but the twisting, rugged nature of the railway line meant that they did not achieve particularly fast speeds.

The Northland Express was the premier service north of Auckland and it operated thrice weekly in each direction. Mixed trains operated from the termini of the Okaihau and Dargaville branch lines to connect with the Express. By the 1950s, the Northland Express was able to maintain a schedule of 5 hours and 20 minutes on the section between Auckland and Whangarei and was operated by steam locomotives such as the J class.

In tandem with the Northland Express, a nightly mixed train ran between Auckland and Opua until 12 November 1956. This unnamed train was known locally as the Morepork, after a breed of native owl.

== Replacement ==
In the 1950s, the Railways Department made the decision to replace its remaining provincial expresses with railcar services. 35 RM class 88 seater railcars were supplied in 1955, and in November 1956, the Northland Express was replaced by these railcars. They did not operate entirely the same route as the Northland Express; at Otiria, instead of heading northeast on the Opua Branch, they ran northwest to Okaihau. From this time, Opua's passenger services were provided by mixed trains from Whangarei and they were not timetabled to provide a connection with the railcar service, although the Dargaville mixed continued to meet the railcars until March 1967, when passengers ceased to be carried on the Dargaville Branch.

The railcars reduced the journey time between Auckland and Whangarei to 4 hours and 10 minutes, but mechanical faults with the railcars and the 1959 opening of the Auckland Harbour Bridge meant that the railcars did not have a long future. They ceased operating on 31 July 1967 and passenger services on the North Auckland Line and Okaihau and Opua branches were operated by mixed trains. The Okaihau mixed ended in 1974, followed by the others in 1976.
