= Pou Herenga Tai – Twin Coast Cycle Trail =

Cycle route in New Zealand

Pou Herenga Tai Twin Coast Cycle Trail
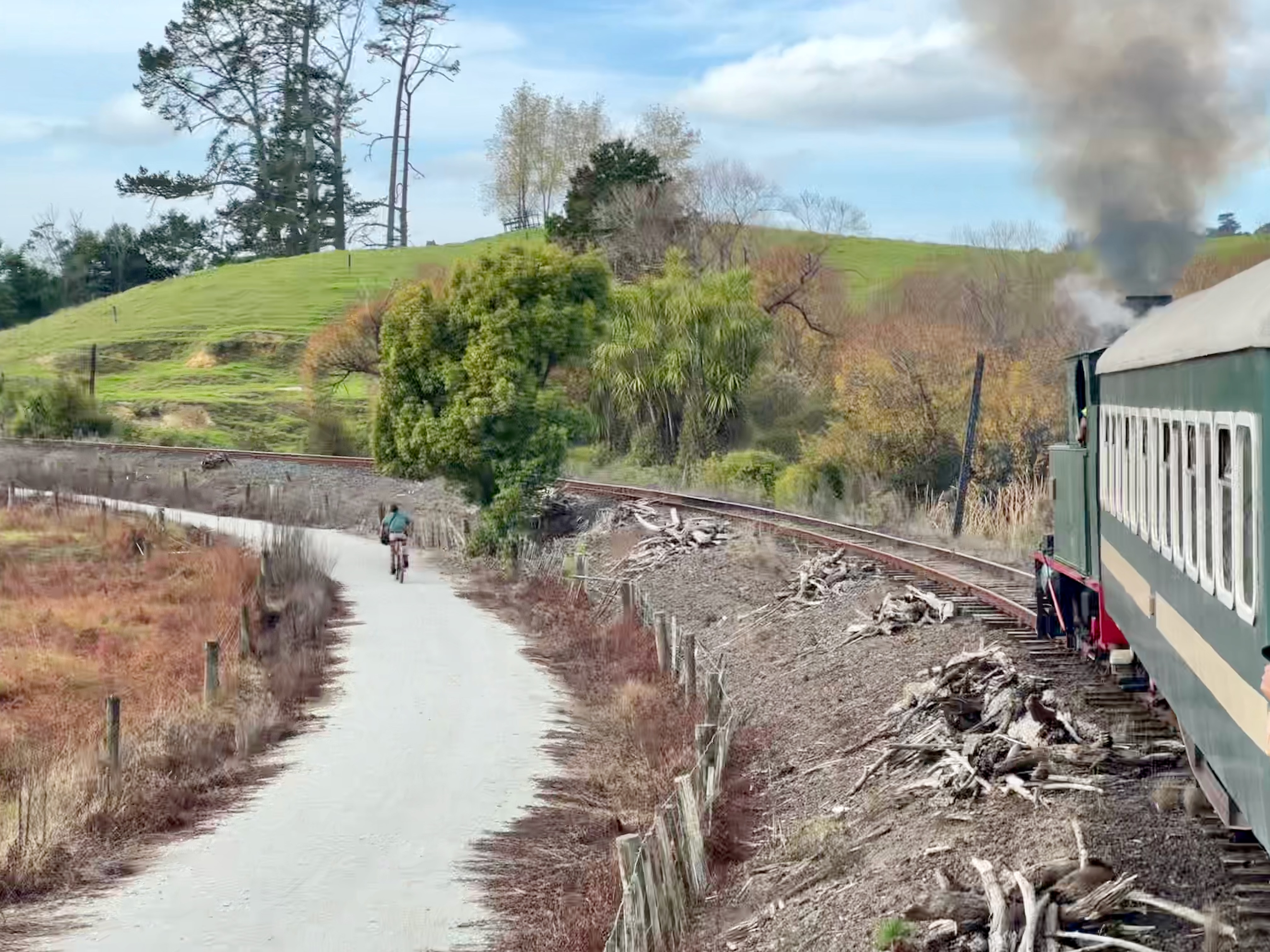
- Between Kawakawa and Taumarere the trail runs beside the Bay of Islands Vintage Railway
- Length: 87 km (54 mi)
- Location: Far North District, New Zealand
- Established: 2016
- Trailheads: Horeke and Opua
- Use: Walking, cycling
- Highest point: 280 m (920 ft)
- Lowest point: 3 m (9.8 ft)
- Difficulty: Grades 1 to 3 (Easiest, easy, intermediate)
- Season: Year round
- Sights: Bay of Islands, coastal inlets, steam railway, Hokianga Harbour
- Hazards: Te Akeake-Taumarere section is on an infrequent train
- Maintainer: Pou Herenga Tai - Twin Coast Cycle Trail Trust
- Website: https://twincoastcycletrail.kiwi.nz/

Pou Herenga Tai – Twin Coast Cycle Trail is one of 23 Great Rides in New Zealand. It is an 87 km (54 mi) cycleway (also used by walkers) in Northland, North Island, fully opened at the end of 2016. At the eastern end, part of the main route involves travelling on the Bay of Islands Vintage Railway (BoIVR), rather than cycling, or walking.

== Pou Herenga Tai - Twin Coast Cycle Trail Trust ==
Pou Herenga Tai - Twin Coast Cycle Trail Trust manages the cycle trail, including maintenance, marketing and future development, to create jobs and provide for tourism with grants from FNDC and NZ Cycle Trails.

Administration of the trail is divided between trusts covering - Taumarere-Opua, Waipuna, Kawakawa-Taumarere, Moerewa, Otiria and Ngapipito Valley and Waipuna, Rakautao, Lake Omapere-Kaikohe, Ōkaihau, Utakura, Māngungu and Horeke.

== Route ==
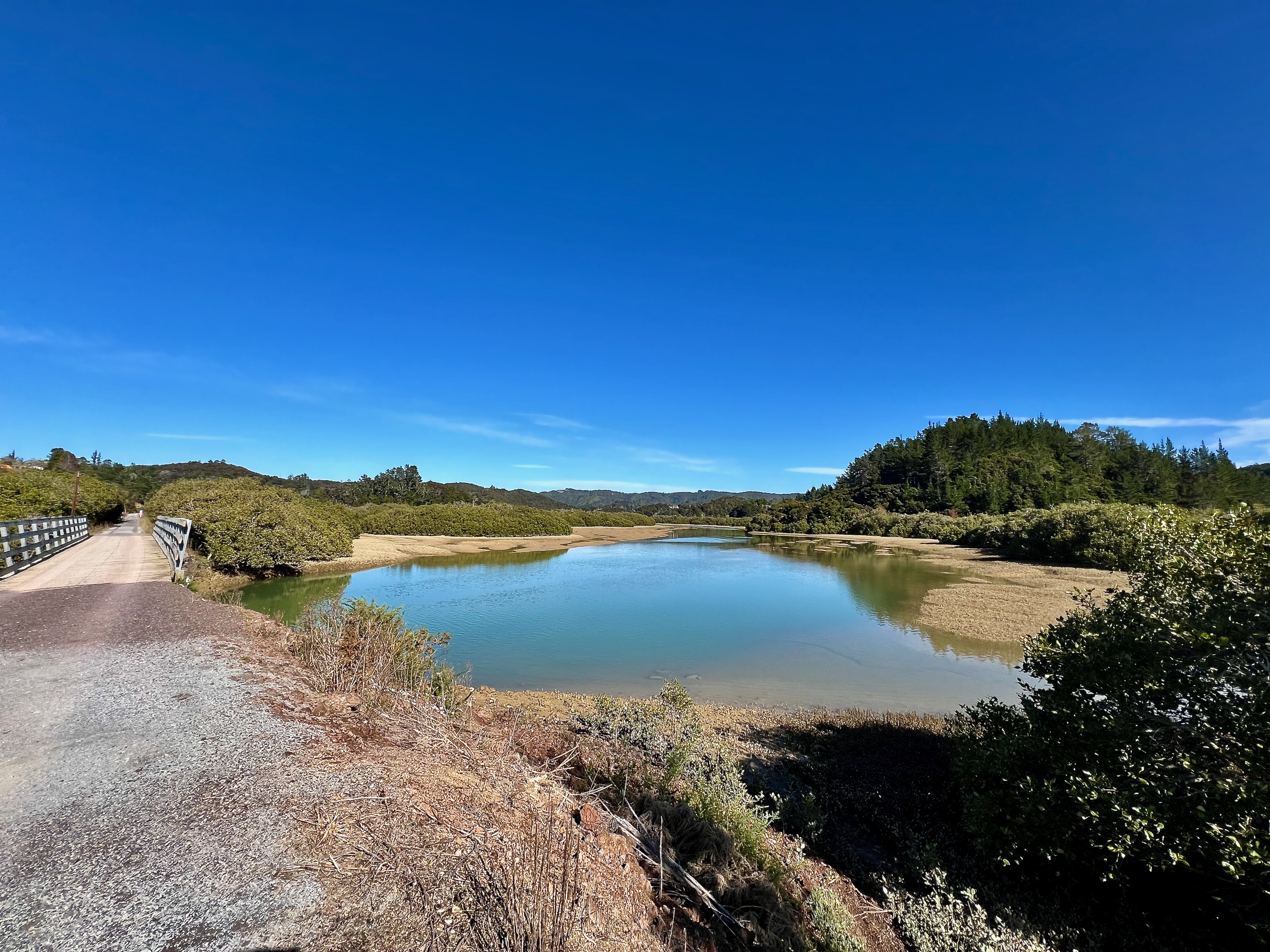
Whangae River and bridge. This section may close if the railway reopens

Much of the route is a rail trail, using the trackbed of the former Opua and Ōkaihau Branch railways.

The central point is Kaikohe, from where the trail descends to the twin coasts, east and west. The Ōkaihau to Horeke section is grade 2-3. Most of the trail is off road grade 1-2 (easiest-easy), with some quiet country roads and a short section on State Highway 1, through the centre of Kawakawa. The western entrance at Baffin St, Opua is 4.4 km (2.7 mi) from the train section at Te Akeake, where a train runs to Taumarere, 3.2 km (2.0 mi) from Kawakawa. When the train isn't running there is a temporary 17.7 km (11.0 mi) alternative route (see below). The trail runs beside the railway from Kawakawa to Taumarere. Dogs, horses and motor vehicles are banned from some of the trail. The trail is described as 4 sections -

=== Opua-Kawakawa ===
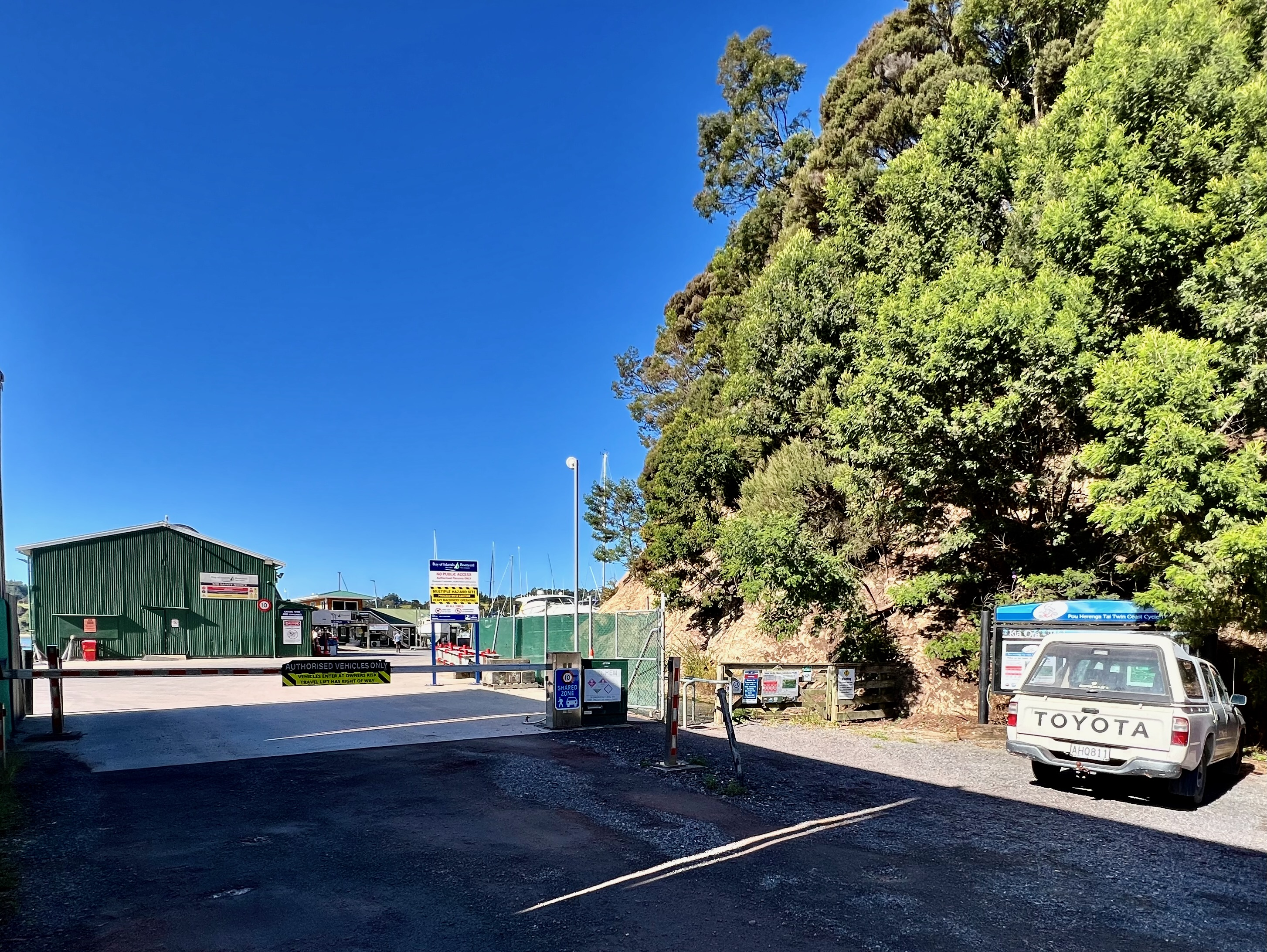
Opua entrance to the cycleway - not a high quality destination

Opua-Kawakawa (11 km (6.8 mi)) is Grade 1 easiest, with marina, mangrove, estuary river crossings, Taumarere station toilet and picnic spot and Hundertwasser toilets in Kawakawa. The cycle trail starts at the end of Baffin Street, Opua. Kawakawa has cafés, supermarket, museum, art gallery, craft and gift shops.

Long Bridge-Te Akeake closed to cyclists after BoIVR used $5.59m, provided in 2020 by the COVID-19 Response and Recovery Fund, to reinstate rail lines buried beneath the trail. BoIVR and FNDC cleared weeds and improved Whangae Tunnel overpass, so that on 26 December 2022 the Te Akeake-Opua section was reopened for cyclists and walkers, but Te Akeake-Taumarere was restricted to travel for a gold coin on the infrequent BoIVR trains.

==== Temporary Opua-Taumarere on-road cycle trail ====
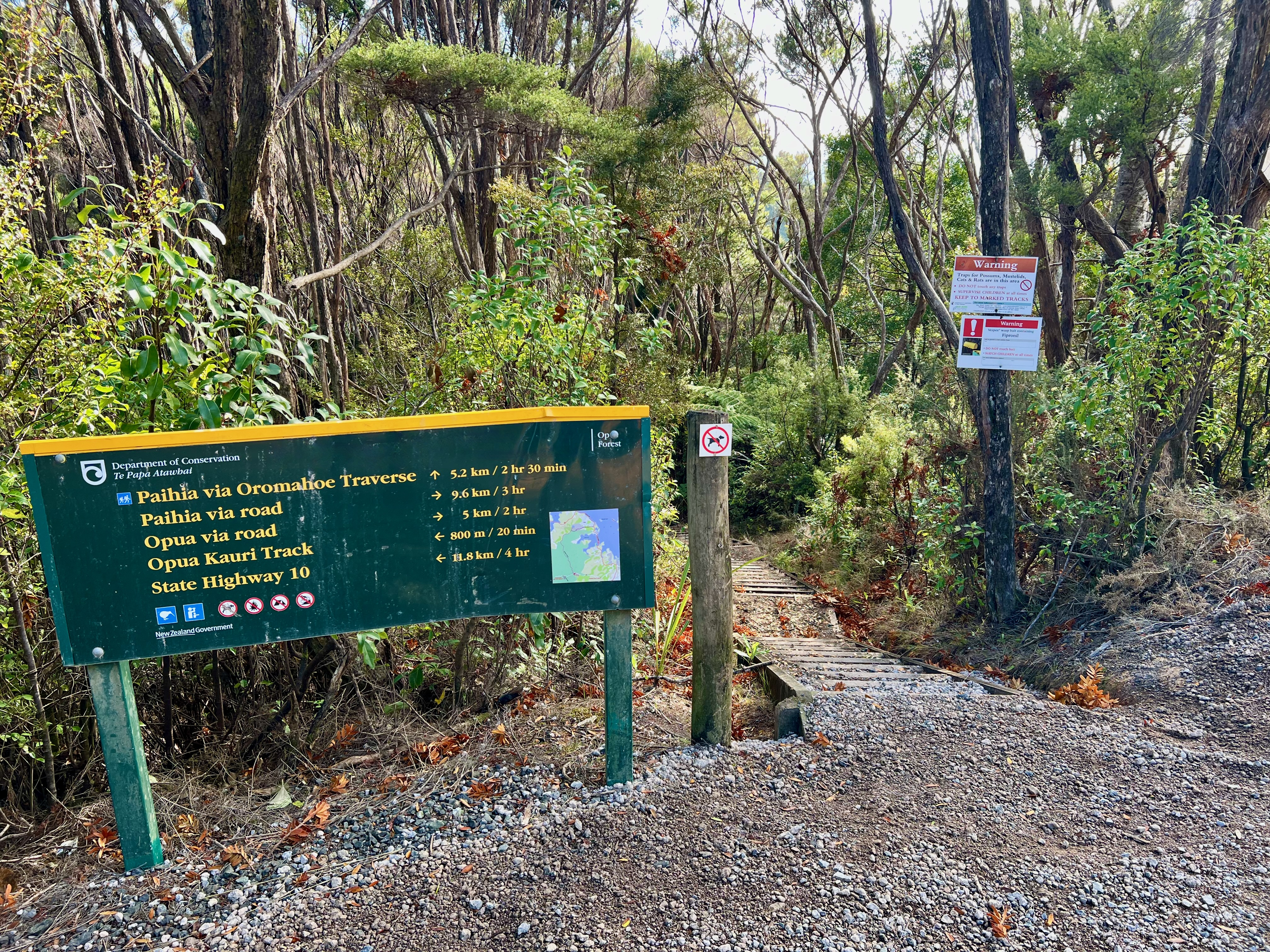
The temporary Opua-Taumarere on-road cycle trail climbs a gravel road to pass this entrance to Oromahoe Traverse walk

In 2022 Far North District Council (FNDC) decided to develop a temporary Opua-Taumarere on-road cycle trail to supplement the railway corridor, which will revert to rail as BoIVR is extended from Taumarere to Opua. As a member of the Northern Adventure Experience (NAX), FNDC worked with BoIVR and the Cycle Trail Trust to ensure that Opua and Kawakawa remain joined by a scenic railway and a cycle trail. However, FNDC said the plan to build a new cycle trail alongside the railway was unviable due to safety and cost, so it signposted a 17 km (11 mi) cycle trail between Opua and Taumarere, via Oromāhoe and Whangae roads. It involves hill climbing, is more than twice as long as the 7.6 km (4.7 mi) railway route and all on roads. FNDC temporarily withdrew from NAX and arranged for bikes to go on trains from Kawakawa to Opua when BoIVR is complete. In 2023 safety was improved for cyclists and pedestrians on Opua Hill, at the junction of Franklin Street, English Bay Road, Oromahoe Road and SH11, by a 60 km/h (37 mph) speed limit on the main road and push-button operated flashing lights to warn traffic when the SH11 crossing is being used.

=== Kawakawa-Kaikohe ===
Kawakawa-Kaikohe (34 km (21 mi)) is Grade 1-2, with a 300 m (980 ft) on-road detour between Kawakawa and Kaikohe, twin suspension bridges at Tuhipa, Orauta Stream, cycling through farmland, Kaikohe Aerodrome and the Hundertwasser toilets. Leaving Kawakawa from just behind the railway station, the trail passes the back of Moerewa, where there is a disused wood mill, industrial areas, a public toilet, bakery, small supermarket, butchery and takeaway. The next 25 km (16 mi) of the trail is a gradual climb to Kaikohe, passing the northernmost operational point of the railway at Otiria, waterfalls, Kaikohe Aerodrome (a long grass strip, built in 1942 as a US Marines bomber base) and Kaikohe Pioneer Village, (200 m (660 ft) off the trail, with a 5 acre outdoor museum). Ngapipito Road, between Otiria and Kaikohe, has an on road section for about 500 m (1,600 ft) before re-joining the formed trail.

=== Kaikohe-Ōkaihau ===
Kaikohe-Ōkaihau (14 km (8.7 mi)) is Grade 1-2. Kaikohe is approximately the middle of the cycle trail and passes Lake Ōmāpere. A 7 ch (460 ft; 140 m) long curved tunnel, built in 1915, is at the 280 m (920 ft) summit of the trail, with views of Hokianga Harbour sand dunes and Mount Hikurangi. A ford close to Ōkaihau can be cycled through, or there is a bridge. Kaikohe has cafés and supermarkets and Ōkaihau a café, takeaways and a supermarket.

=== Ōkaihau-Horeke ===
Ōkaihau-Horeke (28 km (17 mi)) is Grade 2 – 3 easy-intermediate and ends at the 1838 Māngungu Mission Station. On the Settlers Way/Horeke Road section there are views of Puketi Forest through the valley of the Utakura River, a picnic spot (with toilet, tables, old tractors, roosters and chickens), Lily Pond beside the trail, churches, bush and war memorial gates. The trail shares Horeke Road for about 500 m (1,600 ft). The 1.2 km (0.75 mi) boardwalk through the mangroves to Hokianga Harbour is the longest on any of the Great Rides. From the old Horeke Fire Station the trail shares the road for about 3 km (1.9 mi) to the end. Horeke is a small town. There is accommodation in Kohukohu and Rawene. A passenger and cycle ferry runs across Hokianga Harbour, between Horeke, Kohukohu (4km) and Rawene around midday on Tuesdays.

== History ==
The Great Rides were proposed by Prime Minister, John Key, after a 2009 jobs summit, but this one was a surprise 21st item. Between 2010 and 2023 $8,272,028 was spent on the trail. FNDC opened Kaikohe-Ōkaihau in 2013 and Taumarere-Opua in 2014. By 2016 the Kawakawa-Horeke section was open, but 2 bridges on Ngapipito Road, Tirohanga bridge, Horeke boardwalk and 2 truss bridges were being built and the section near Kaikohe Aerodrome was being designed. Taumarere-Kawakawa was built beside the railway, but re-piling of the Long Bridge took longer, than the originally expected completion in June 2014. At the end of 2016 the trail fully opened to Horeke, after missing a mid-2016 deadline and concerns, in 2015, it might never be finished. The Ōkaihau-Horeke section was officially opened on 18 March 2017. Otago Rail Trail was said to be a river of gold, especially needed for, "the poorer west where few visitors venture and where jobs are scarce".

== Future plans ==
=== Colenso Triangle terminus ===
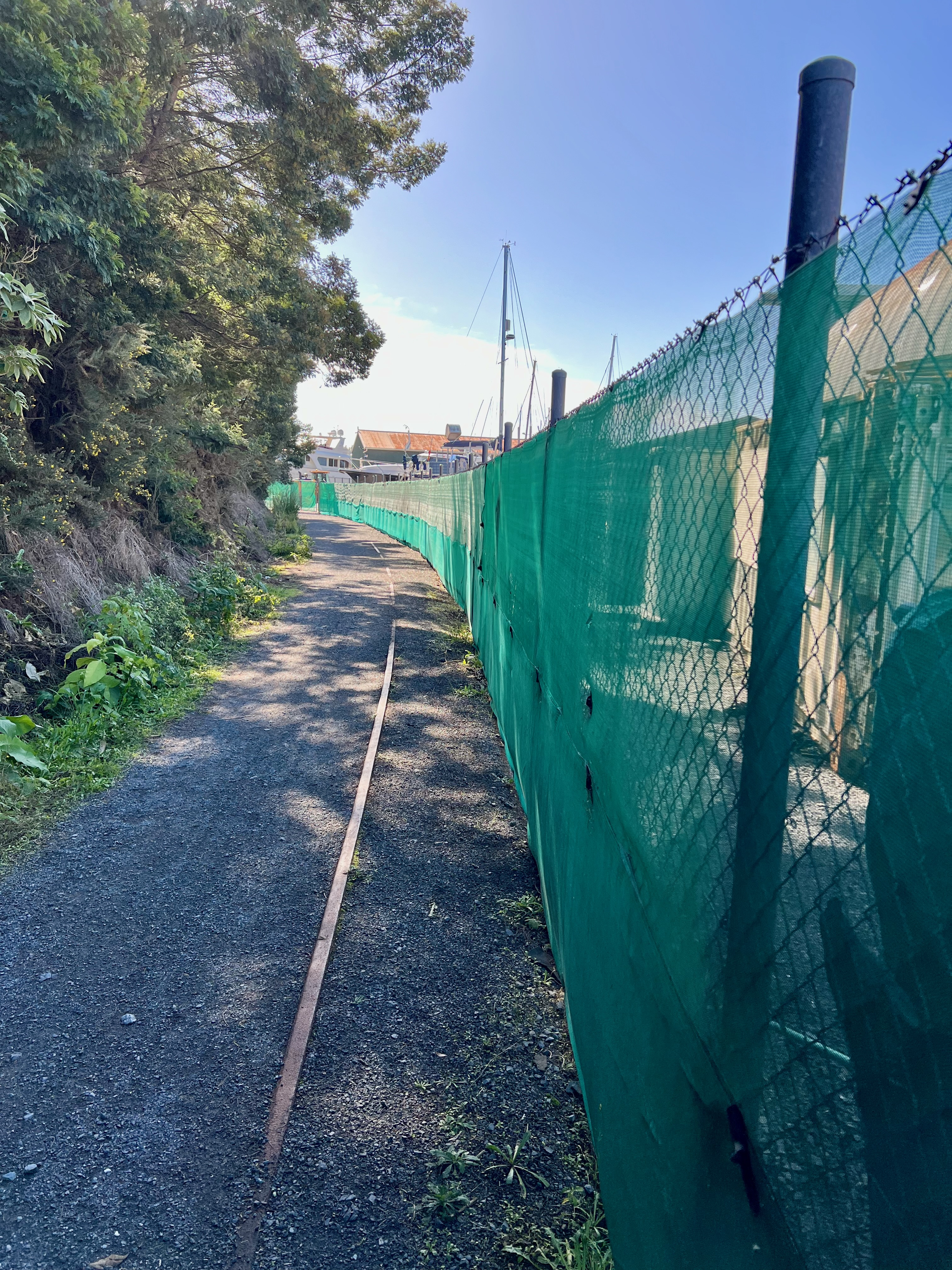
The start of the cycleway at Opua is alongside a boatyard and the rails remained in place in 2024

The Baffin Street entrance to the trail is about 750 m (820 yd) from the original site of Opua station. On 28 August 2017 BoIVR got a resource consent to build a station, café, function room, bike hire shop, water tower and locomotive turntable at Colenso Triangle and promised to build a cycleway alongside the railway. However, having the cycle trail end at Colenso Triangle does not align with the Northland Walking and Cycling Strategy, nor NZ Cycle Trails Great Rides requirements, as it isn't a 'high quality' destination. Construction of a maritime servicing area in Kawakawa River South, is under Waitangi Treaty Claim and, once a settlement is made, agreement will be needed between mana whenua and the Cycle Trail Trust for use of the cycle trail. The land has been landbanked for settlement, but no Cultural Impact Assessment prepared to support the application.

== Trail use ==
Trail counters in the year to 28 February 2020 recorded 68,817 pedestrian and cycle trips. At least 3,600 rode the whole trail. The Opua end had over 5 times the cycle counts of the Horeke end, but Horeke had the largest number of walkers; at a bridge a few kilometres south of Horeke 21,332 (11,733 people) walked and 4,721 (4,155 people) cycled. Pedestrians walked out and back, but most cyclists went to Horeke. It may be the least popular section for cycling, though cyclists using the quiet country road alongside aren't counted. 2,542 (1,907 people) walked and 6,333 (5,636 people) cycled 2 km (1.2 mi) out of Ōkaihau, at Macadamia Farm entrance. 2 km (1.2 mi) north of Kaikohe, between a mountain bike track, a tunnel and a café at Ōkaihau 7,207 (4,324 people) walked and 11,633 (8,725 people) cycled. 2 km (1.2 mi) west of Moerewa, where, apart from the historic railway bridges, there is no strong destination for there-and-back trips, 3,857 (2,893 people) walked and 7,857 (7,071 people) cycled. 400 m (440 yd) west of Kawakawa 9,300 (5,580 people) walked and 12,924 (9,693 people) cycled, showing use by local commuters. 500 m (550 yd) from Opua carpark 14,228 (9,960 people) walked and 26,432 (19,824 people) cycled. Walkers and cyclists do out and back trips for the scenery and level trail. In 2021 figures were 35,668 pedestrians, 30,949 cyclists and in 2022 29,269 pedestrians and 33,395 cyclists, a total of 62,665, a drop of 6% to 2022, compared with an average 10% growth in use of all the Great Rides.
