= Whāngae River =

Coordinates: 35°20′S 174°06′E

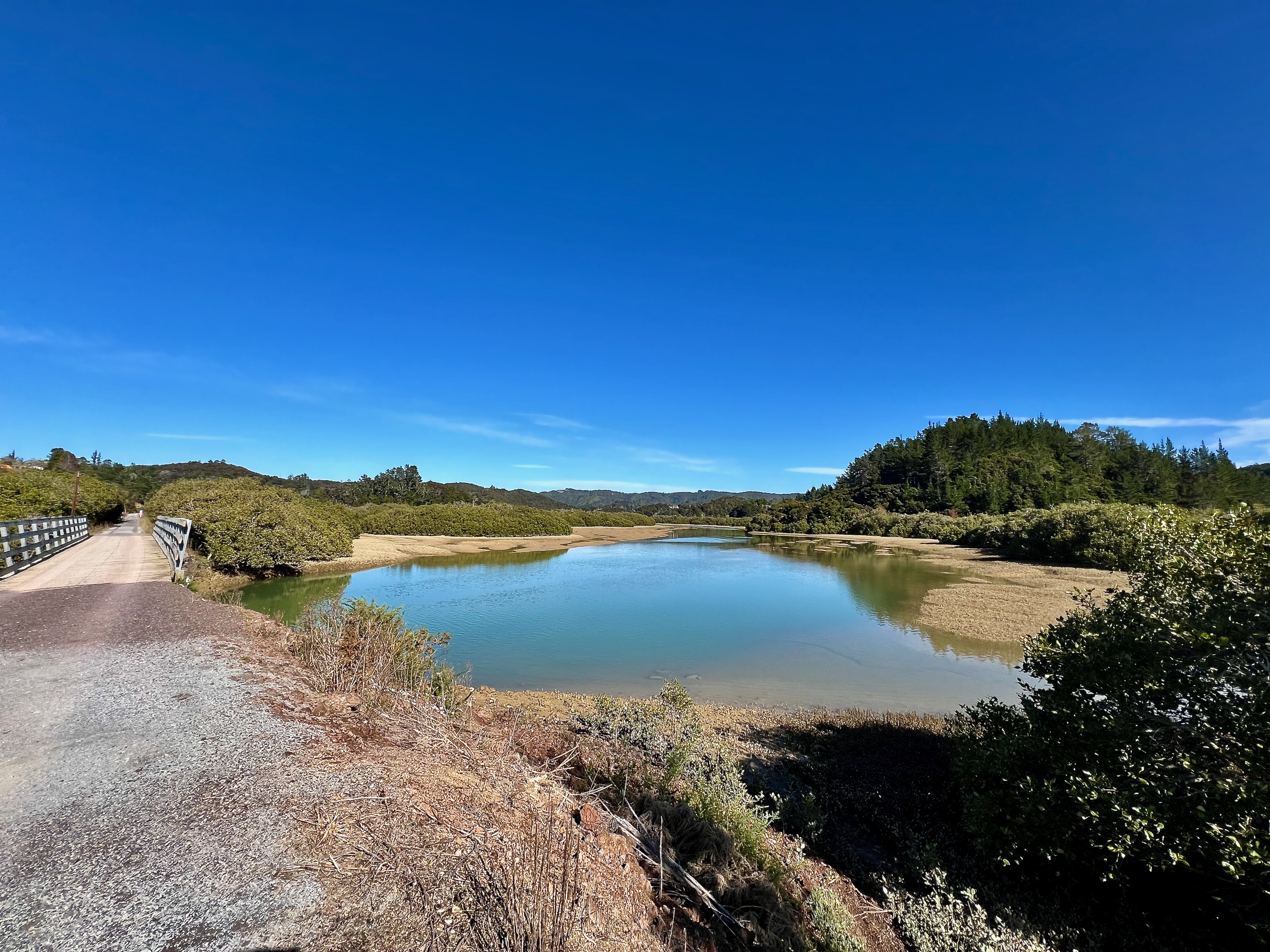
- Whāngae River and bridge

Location
- Country: New Zealand

Physical characteristics
- Source
  - location: Kawakawa hill
  - elevation: 229 m (751 ft)
- Mouth
  - location: Bay of Islands
  - elevation: 0 m

The Whāngae River is a short river of the Northland Region of New Zealand's North Island. It flows generally northeast to reach a southwestern arm of the Bay of Islands. The estuary is about 2 km (1.2 mi) and the river about 5 km (3.1 mi) long. Like much of the coast north of Whangārei, the valley is formed of Waipapa greywacke.

The Whāngae River estuary is designated as an area of Outstanding Natural Character, due to its railway causeway (now followed by the Pou Herenga Tai – Twin Coast Cycle Trail) and its tall mangroves (mānawa), which give way up river to saltmarsh. Bush covers much of the valley, mainly taraire-pūriri forest with emergent rimu, rewarewa and occasional tōtara, pukatea, kahikatea and kauri. More tōwai grow towards Opua. There are also areas of manuka, kānuka, tanekaha, kohuhu. five finger (puahou), mamaku, patē, hangehange, cabbage tree (tī), cutty grass and raupō, with Northland green gecko (kawariki), tomtit (miromiro), brown kiwi, weka, kererū and kōtātā.

From 14 August 1931 to 1 September 1963 there was a Whangae Bridge flag railway station.

In 2026, the spelling of the river's name was officially altered from Whangae to Whāngae.

== See also ==
- List of rivers of New Zealand
