= Taumarere railway station =

Defunct railway station in New Zealand

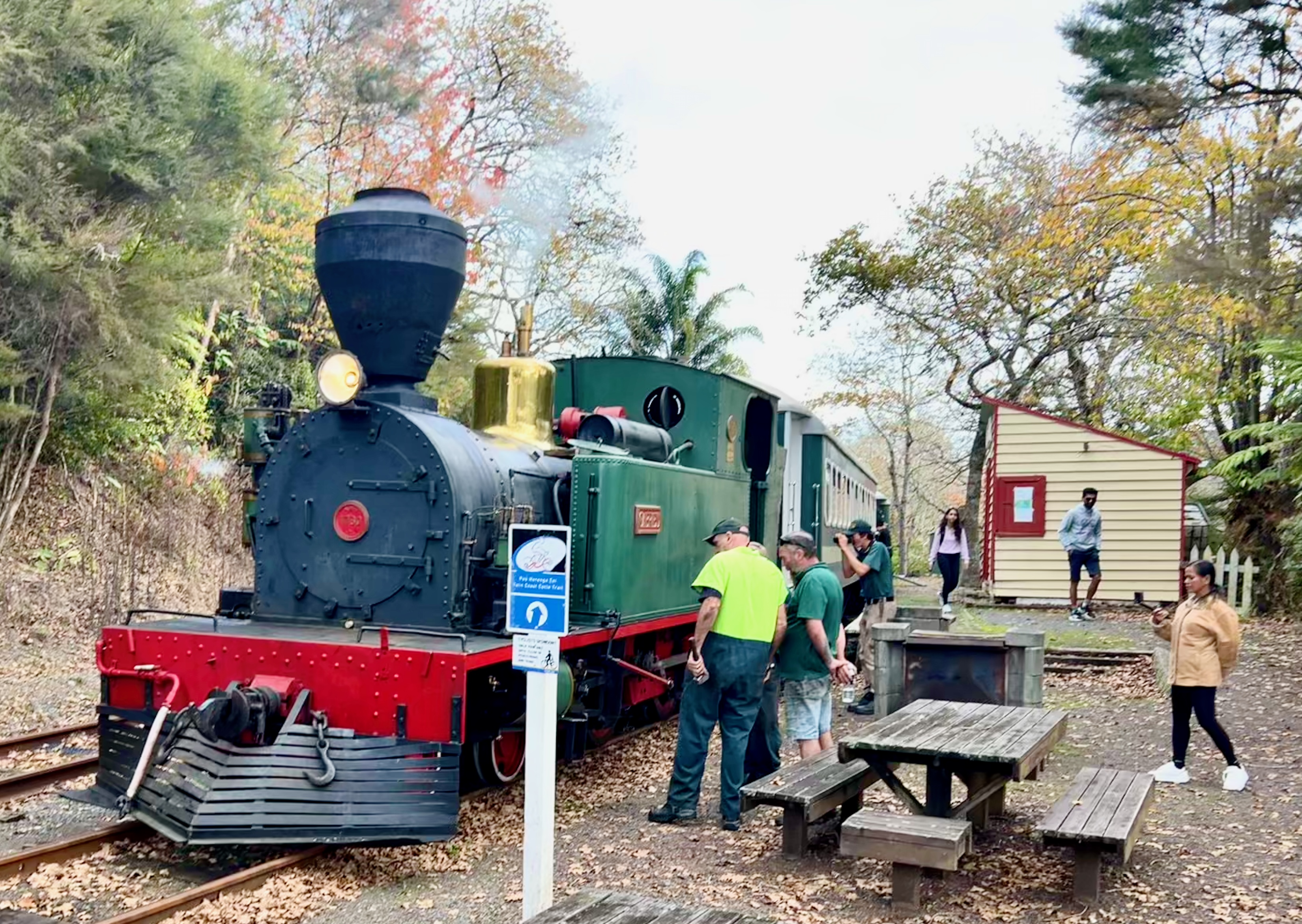
- Taumarere railway station in 2024

General information
- Location: New Zealand
- Coordinates: 35.3609°S 174.0939°E
- Line: Opua Branch

History
- Opened: 24 December 1867

Services
Preceding station	Historical railways	Following station
Kawakawa; Line open, station open 3.14 km (1.95 mi) towards Whangārei	Opua Branch; NZR	Te Akeake; Line open, station open 1 mi 44 ch (2.5 km) towards Opua
Location

Taumarere railway station was a station on the Opua Branch in New Zealand and is a stop on the Bay of Islands Vintage Railway near Taumarere village. It is on the oldest railway built on the North Island, which opened in 1867. Taumarere station has had three locations, east of the village, west of the village and at the rugby ground.

== History ==
Coal was discovered at Kawakawa in 1864. Rails and wagons from the Auckland & Drury railway were used for the 1,435 mm (4 ft 8 1/2 in) gauge, horse-drawn tramway from the mine to the Derrick wharf on the Kawakawa River at Taumarere. The tramway opened on 26 December 1867 and was completed on 16 January 1868, after which the mine was transferred to the newly formed Bay of Islands Coal Company. Horses and the wooden tramway line were replaced on January 28, 1871, by the first steam engine to run in the North Island. In 1874 Bay of Islands Coal Company agreed with Auckland Province that the government would take over the tramway and build the extension. The line was closed from 2 to 11 December 1876 to allow for it to be converted to 3 ft 6 in gauge. Work on the Kawakawa River viaduct and first mile of the extension to Opua was completed in April 1881, a contract was let on 10 December 1880 for the remaining 4 mi 11 ch (6.7 km) and a start was made in June 1881, but it wasn't until October 1883 that authority was sought for a solid platform at the station, which was rebuilt before 7 April 1884, when the extension opened. When the line opened to Opua, the 38 chains (2,500 ft; 760 m) to the Derrick Wharf closed. The company declined an offer to run the line, as it did not wish to raise more capital, so the track was operated by New Zealand Railways Department. The company sold the tramway to the government and paid 6% of the total cost of the line to lease it back.

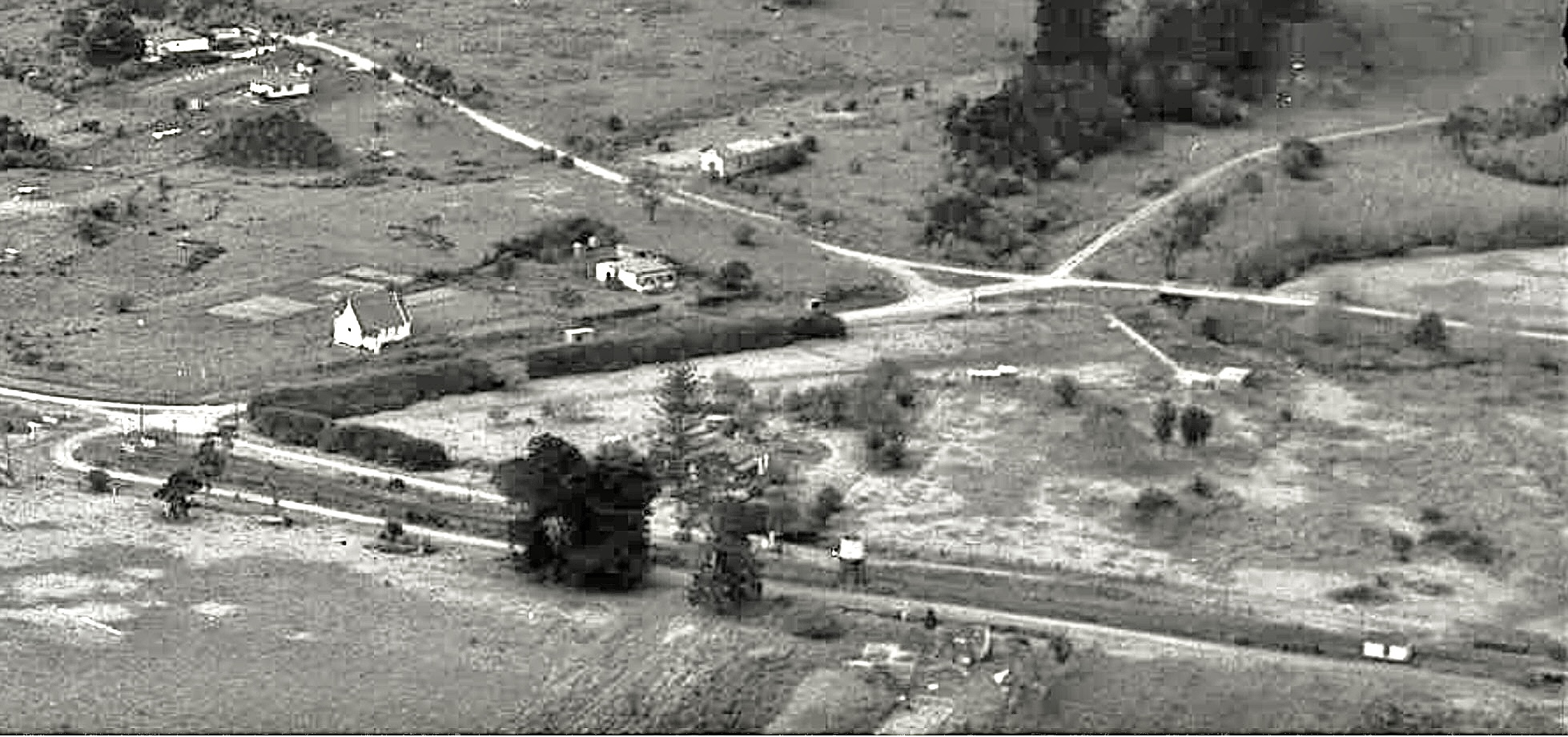
Taumarere in 1958, when the station had a water tank and was west of the village

The station was originally closer to the village, between Bridge 5 (Tirohanga Stream) and the Rugby Club, but, after closure on 7 April 1974, it was moved east, near the bridge over the Kawakawa River. In 1883, as a railway, and then in 1890 as a tramway, a Kamo-Puhipuhi link was proposed, with a possible Taumarere-Puhipuhi extension, including a 1 in 12 incline. Possibly it was the same proposed tramway depicted in an undated plan of the station. Taumarere had one of the five stationmaster's houses built on the line about 1883. By 1898 it had a platform, water tower, cattle yard and a passing loop and a loading bank was added in 1916. The siding was removed about 1955. In 1963 the kauri-planked building was bought for £100. In 1997 it was given back to the railway. With closure of the railway in 2000, the building and its surrounds deteriorated, graffiti daubed, and the whole area became unkempt. A wooden platform was built at the rugby ground in 2011.

== Long Bridge ==
Bridge 9 is a curved viaduct over the Kawakawa River, just to the east of the current station. When completed n 1882 it was 19.5 ch (1,290 ft; 390 m) long, on 19 x 20 ft (6.1 m) and 22 x 40 ft (12 m) spans, 20 ft (6.1 m) above high tide level, with piles 30 ft (9.1 m) below the water. In 2011 and 2015 the bridge was described as 340 m (1,120 ft) long, the longest curved wooden bridge in the southern hemisphere. The original bridge and first mile of the extension cost £9,274. The bridge was strengthened in 1927 to allow AB Class engines to use it and steel girders replaced the decking in 1937. In 2014 the Lottery gave over $470,000 to renew the bridge piles.

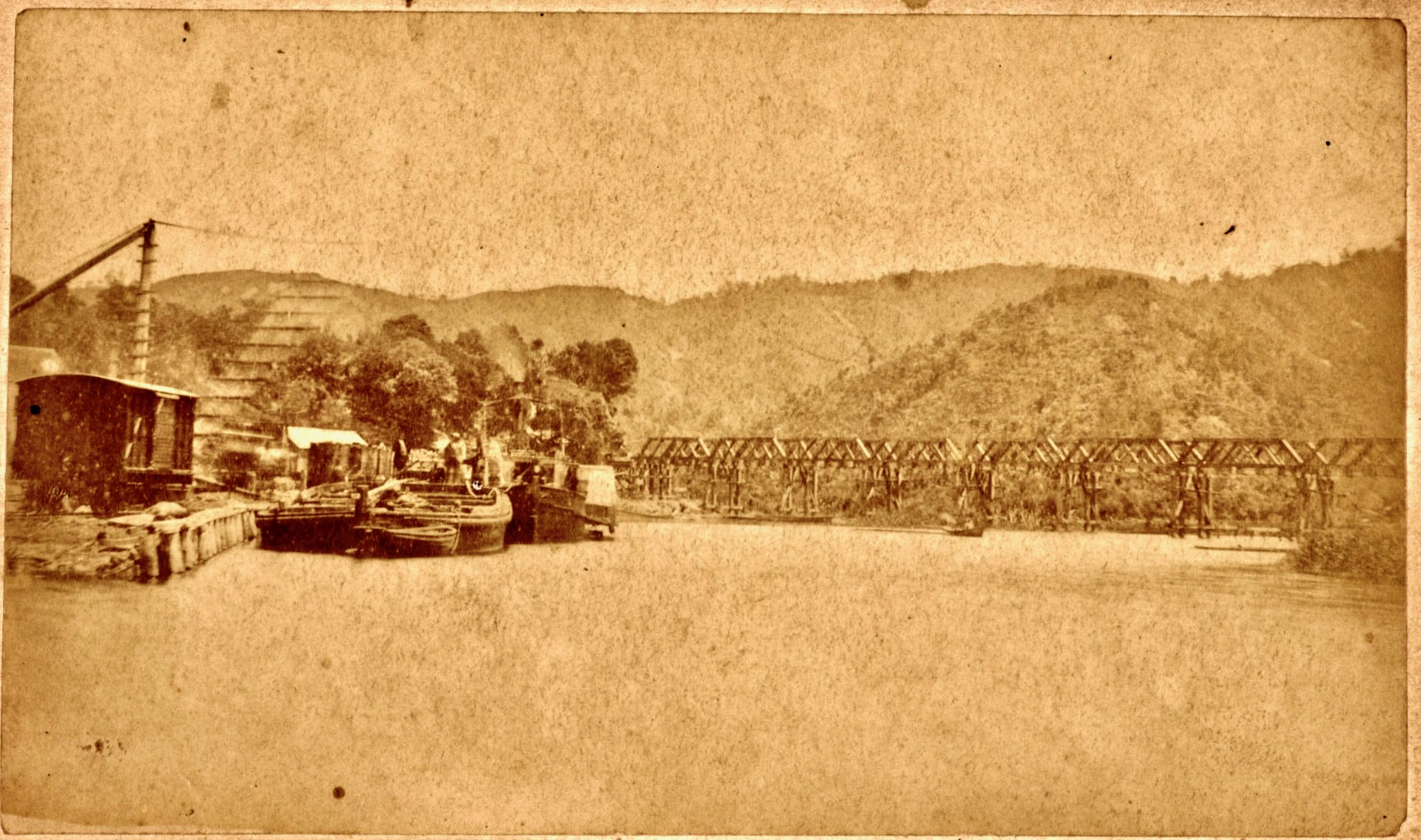
Derrick Wharf and Long Bridge about 1884

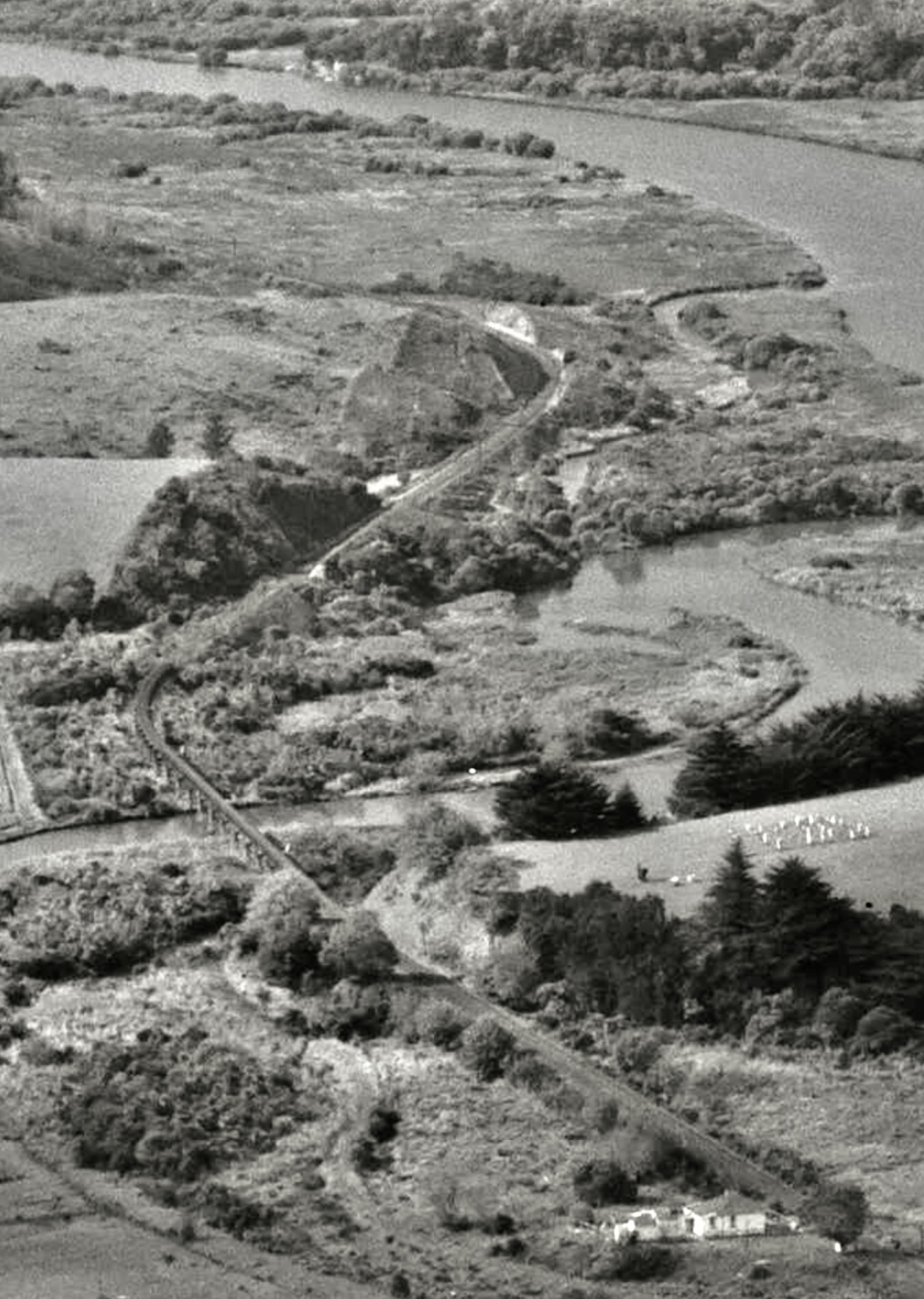
Long Bridge in 1958

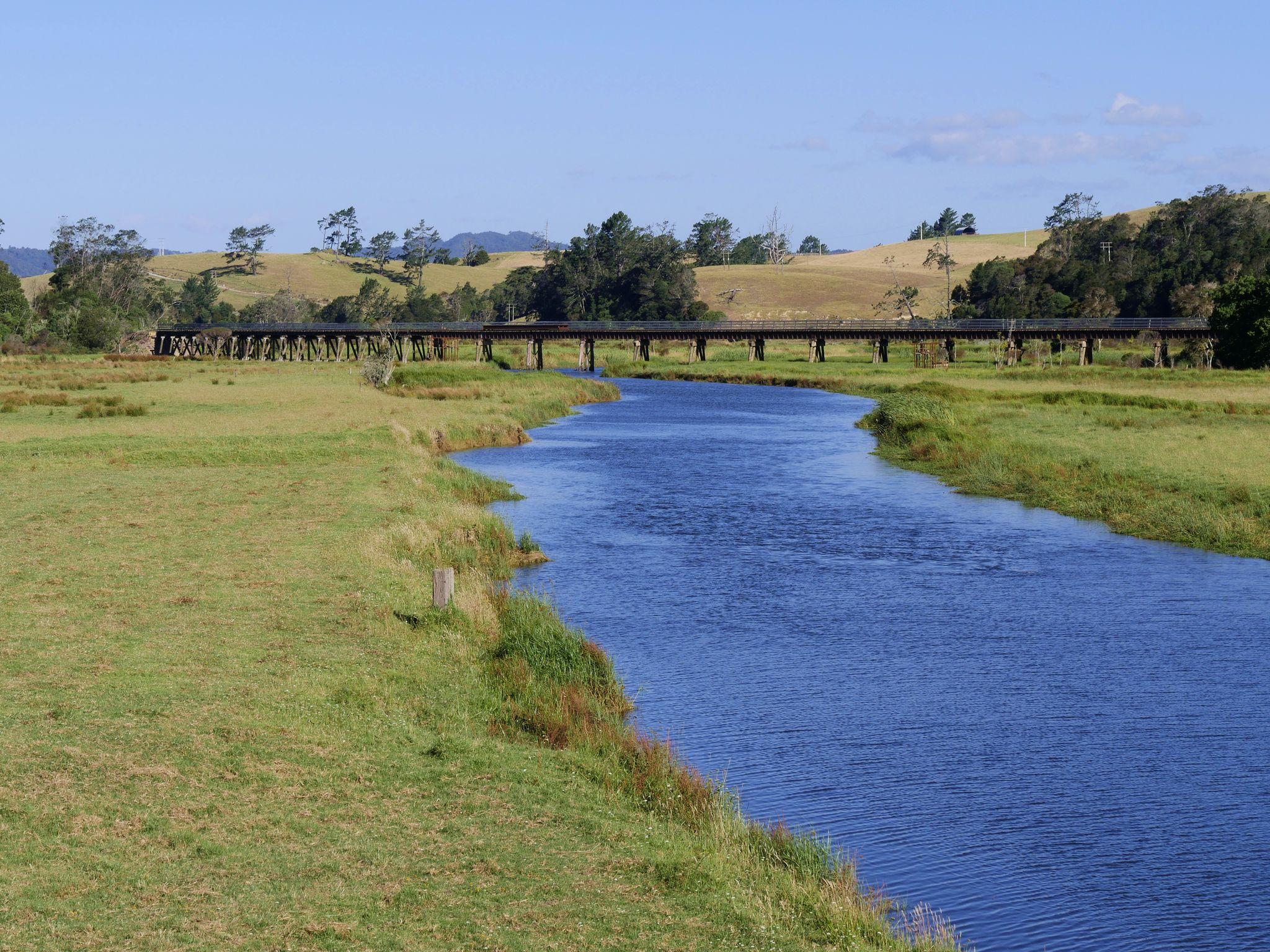
Long Bridge from State Highway 11 in 2017
