= Kawakawa railway station =

Defunct railway station in New Zealand

Coordinates: 35.3804°S 174.0634°E

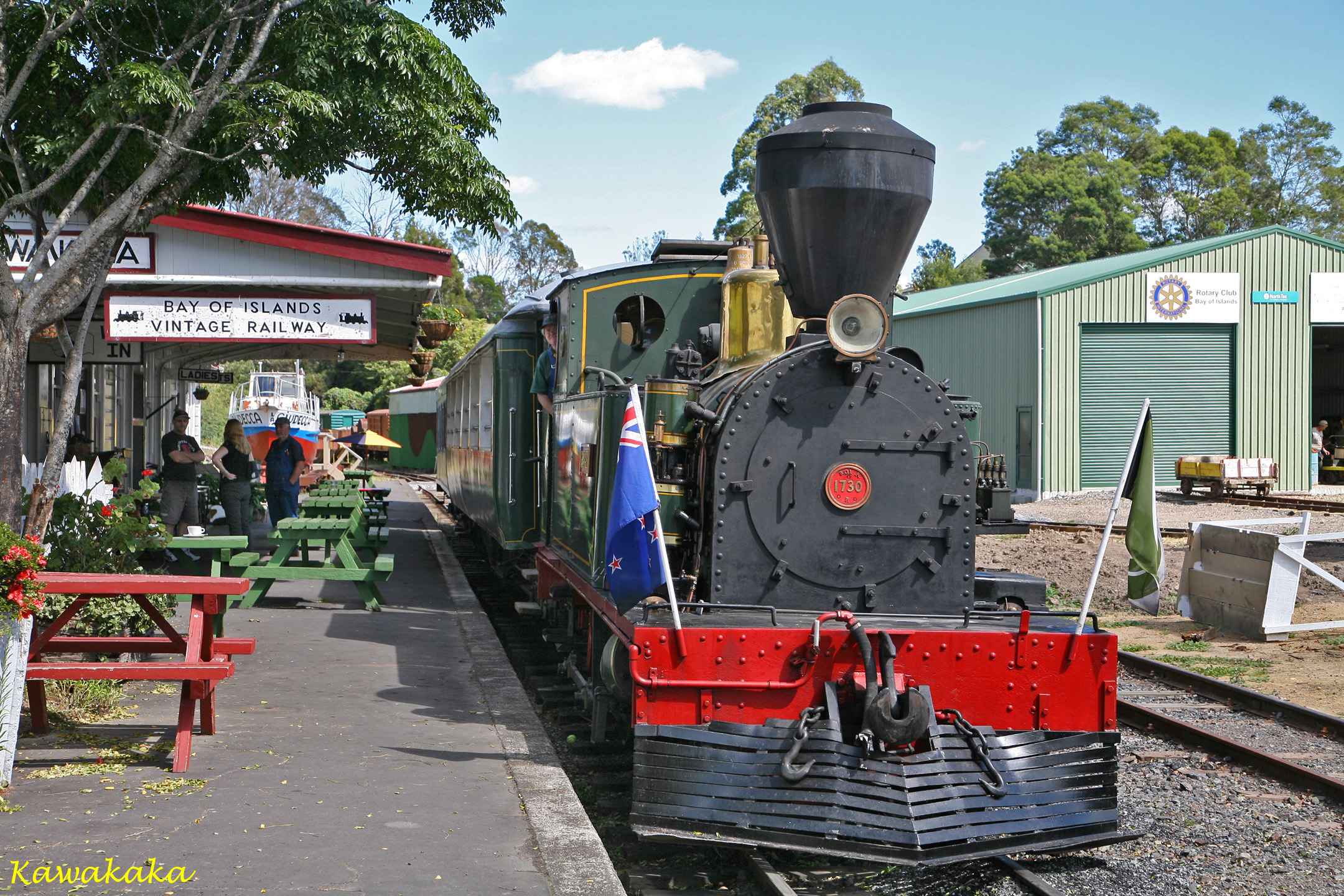
- Kawakawa in 2009

General information
- Location: New Zealand
- Elevation: 25 ft (7.6 m)
- Line: Opua Branch

Other information
- Classification: RHTNZ Category B building

History
- Opened: 24 December 1867

Services
Preceding station	Historical railways	Following station
Moerewa; Line open, station open 3.76 km (2.34 mi) towards Whangārei	Opua Branch; NZR	Taumarere; Line open, station open 3.14 km (1.95 mi) towards Opua
Location

Kawakawa railway station was a station on the Opua Branch in New Zealand. and is the terminus of the Bay of Islands Vintage Railway (BoIVR) in the small town of Kawakawa. It was also the terminus of the oldest railway on the North Island, opened in 1867, before being joined to the rest of the North Auckland Line in 1912.

== History ==
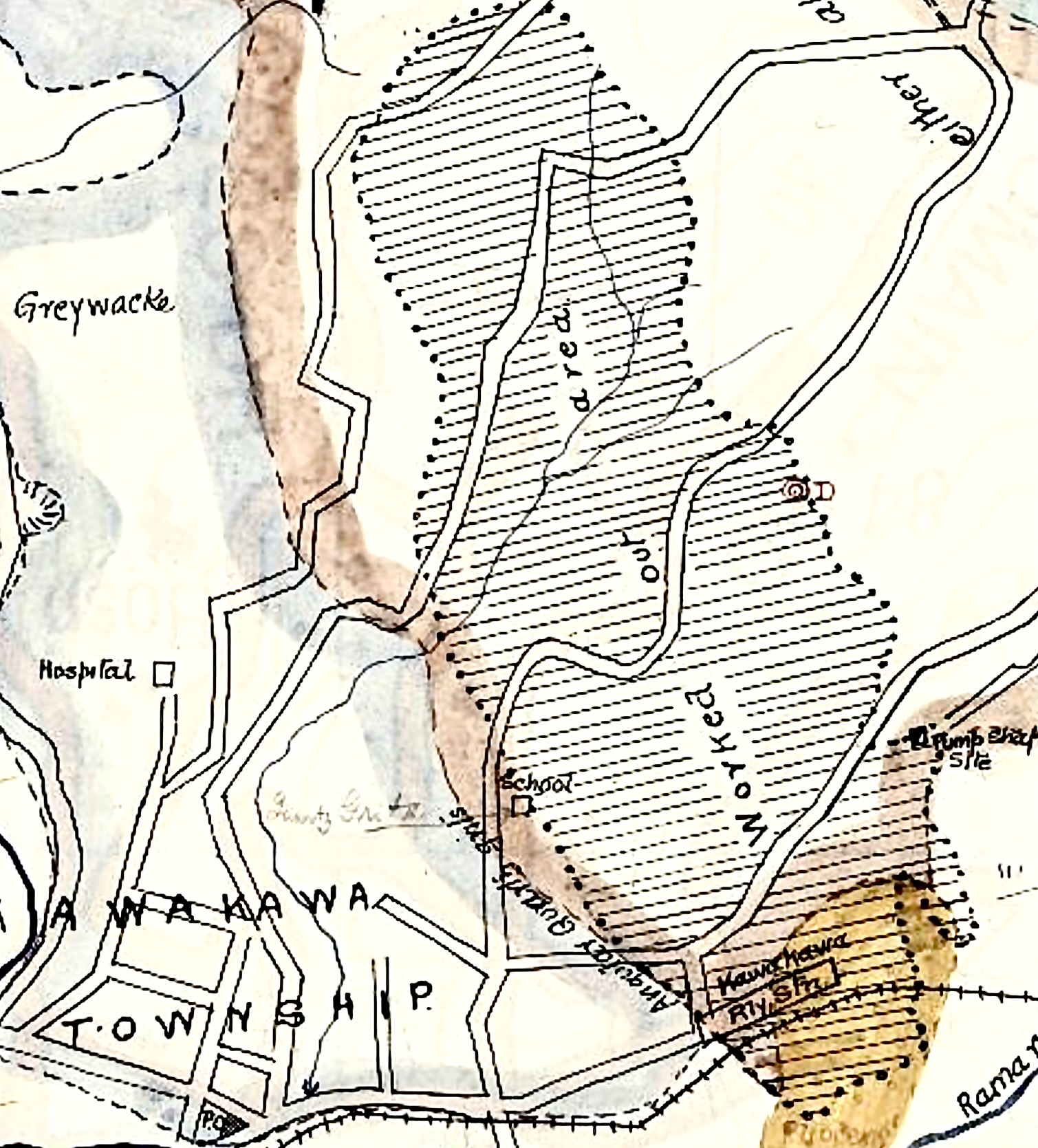
The coalfield was mostly to the south of the railway station

=== Coal mine tramway ===
Coal was discovered at Kawakawa in 1864. In 1867 local politician, John McLeod, raised enough to start the mine, but was short of capital, so a toll on each ton of coal paid for Robert Martin & Co to build a 1,435 mm (4 ft 8 1/2 in) gauge, horse-drawn tramway to Marsh's wharf and boat shed, on the Kawakawa River at Taumarere; Marsh Brown was a local rangatira and it was later called Derrick wharf. From there a steam tug, Waiomio, towed 6 barges to deeper water, where ships could be loaded with coal (in 1893 the barges were sold to Ngunguru Coal Mine). Wagons and a mile of the tramway with iron rails came from the Auckland & Drury railway and the rest ran on rails made of local kahikatea. In October 1867 about 60 men were building the tramway, which opened on 26 December 1867 and was completed on 16 January 1868, In 1868 the tramway and mine were transferred to Bay of Islands Coal Company (BoICC), which McLeod set up. By December 1870 Martin was again working on the tramway, raising, ballasting, and extending it. Horses and the wooden rails were replaced on 28 January 1871, by the first steam engine to run in the North Island. By 1873 the easy seams had been worked out and others were being sought.

=== Extension to Opua ===
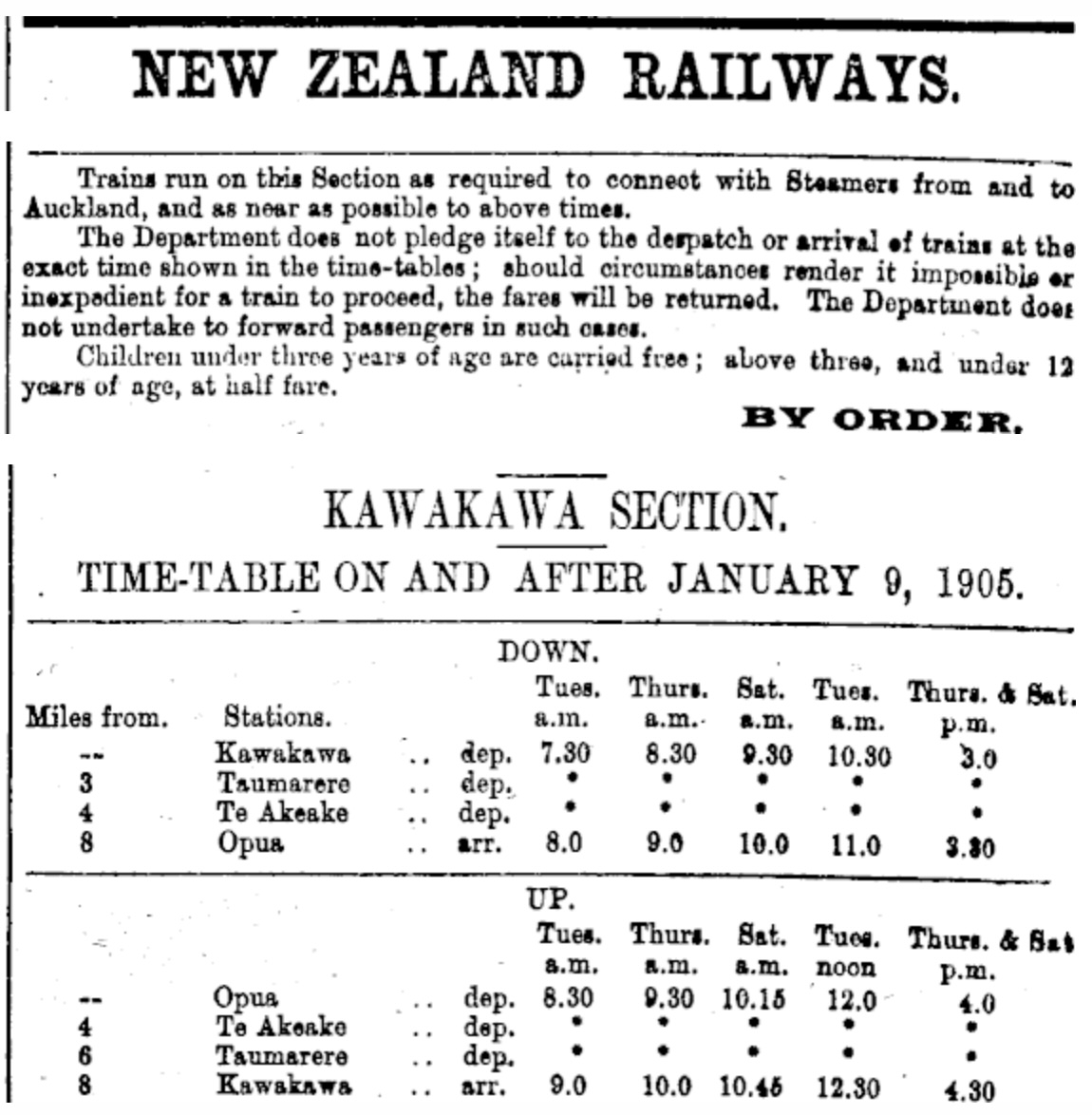
NZR 1905 Opua timetable. In 1919 trains still took half an hour

In 1874 BoICC agreed with Auckland Province that the government would take over the tramway and build the extension. The line was closed from 2 to 11 December 1876 to allow for conversion to 3 ft 6 in gauge. A contract for a goods shed and loading platform was signed on 14 April 1877 and a stationmaster's house built for £292. 22. When the line was extended to the deep water port of Opua, in 1883, BoICC declined an offer to run the line, as it did not wish to raise more capital, so the line was operated by New Zealand Railways Department (NZR). BoICC sold the tramway to the government and paid 6% of the total cost of the line to lease it back. On Monday 7 April 1884 the Kawa Kawa line opened to Opua and the goods shed was extended. There was also mention of a weighbridge being considered, but the next record of it was in 1968, when the mine weighbridge office, which had been at Opua since about 1907, was donated to Kawakawa Rotary Club. In 1895 coal was loaded by a hopper near the station. In 1885 a manager's office was built and a telephone installed between Kawa Kawa goods shed and Opua. In 1886 the location of cattle yards was considered. Kawakawa engine shed burnt down on 3 January 1888. It seems to have been rebuilt quickly, but was again on fire on 23 June 1890. In 1896 a porter was employed and a need for improved accommodation was noted; there had been a petition in 1886 against removal of the station. In 1897 a cottage was moved from Opua and used as a ladies’ waiting room. The goods shed was attached to the station in 1902. In 1910 £1780 was spent on a class B station with a verandah, urinal, yards and picket fence, finished by March 1911. which existed by 1902. By 1898 it had a platform, 40 ft (12 m) x 30 ft (9.1 m) goods shed, loading bank, water tower, cattle yard, weighbridge, engine shed, passing loop for 30 wagons and by 1899 also urinals. From 1 February 1900 to 14 March 1911 there was a Post Office at the station. The station was moved for opening of the Whangārei line in 1911. In 1900 there were further improvements. In 1909 there was a new platform, in 1910 a rearranged station yard and in 1916 more improvements. By 1964 the loop could take 32 wagons.

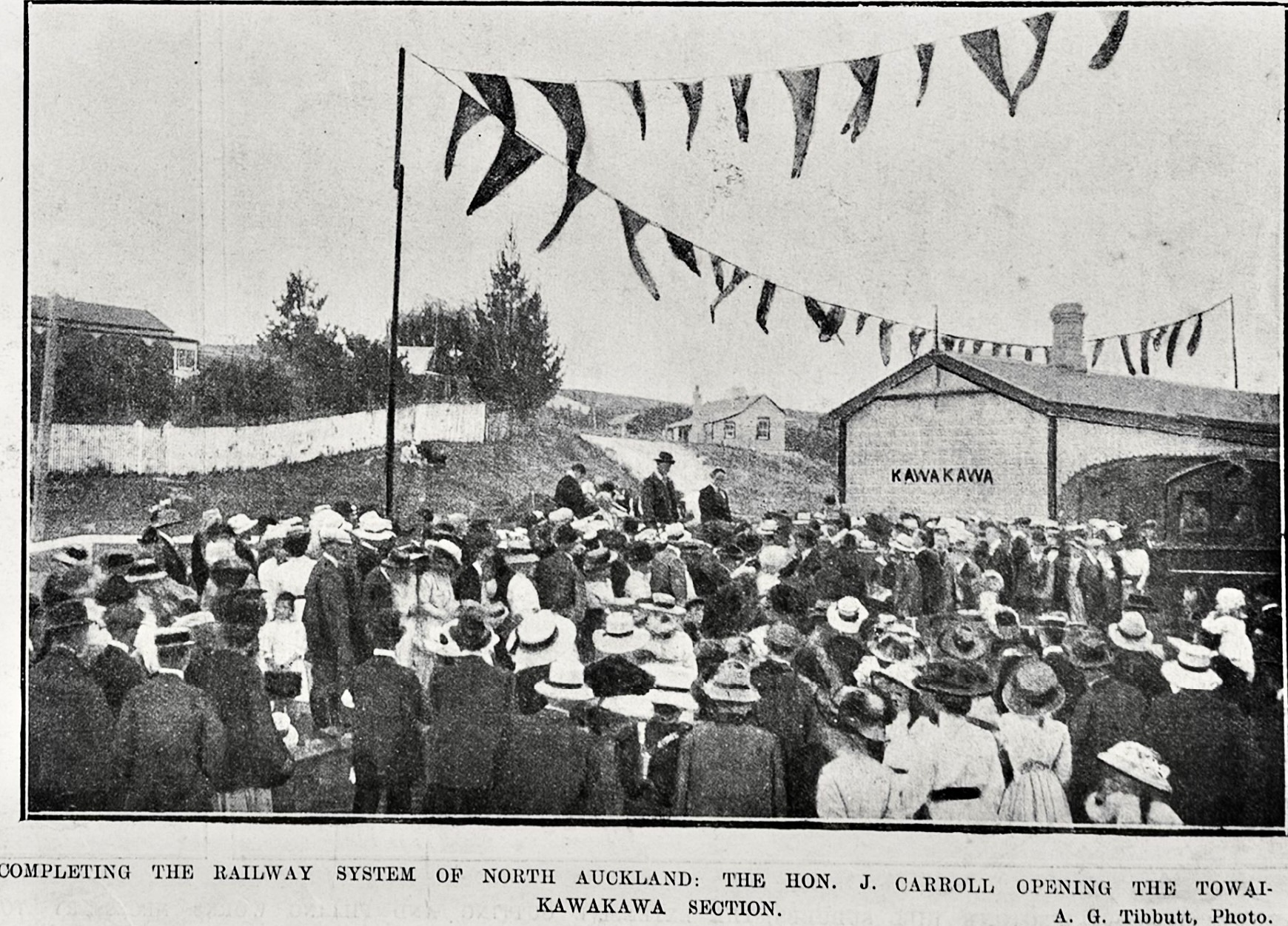
1912 opening ceremony

=== Extension to Whangārei ===
An 1880 plan proposed a more direct route south (as followed by SH1) than the one completed over 30 years later. It would have used the Waiomio valley, just to the east of Kawakawa. The Opua–Grahamtown Line, as it was known in 1911, was finished to Scoria Flat (later named Moerewa) around 1905. In May 1908 it was noted that trains ran there about once a week. However, it wasn't until 14 July 1910 that PWD connected the rails through to Whangārei. On 31 March 1911 the Towai–Kawakawa Section got a certificate of Inspection, as safe for traffic at 20 mph (32 km/h). It was officially opened by the acting Prime Minister, James Carroll, on Thursday 13 April 1911.

Once the Whangārei section was linked to Auckland, from December 1925 to November 1956 the Auckland–Opua Northland Express served the station. Mixed trains continued a Whangārei passenger service until 18 June 1976, but didn't connect with the Auckland-Ōkaihau railcar. The Otiria–Kawakawa–Opua line was unused from 1985.

From 1895 Kawakawa was included in the annual traffic reports. For example, in 1944 11,678 tickets were sold, an average of about 32 a day, plus 117 season tickets.

=== Street running railway ===
Kawakawa is the only place in the country, other than a road-rail bridge, where the railway runs along a road. In 1910 it was noted that the road was narrow and had a railway alongside it. In 1936 the Kawakawa Chamber of Commerce asked for the railway to be moved from the main street, but the government said other schemes had a higher priority than the £30.000 to £40,000 it would have cost to reroute the railway. In 1937 Gillies Street was tar sealed. It seems to have been as late as 1959 that NZR noted that their line ran down the centre of the main street, which is part of State Highway 1.

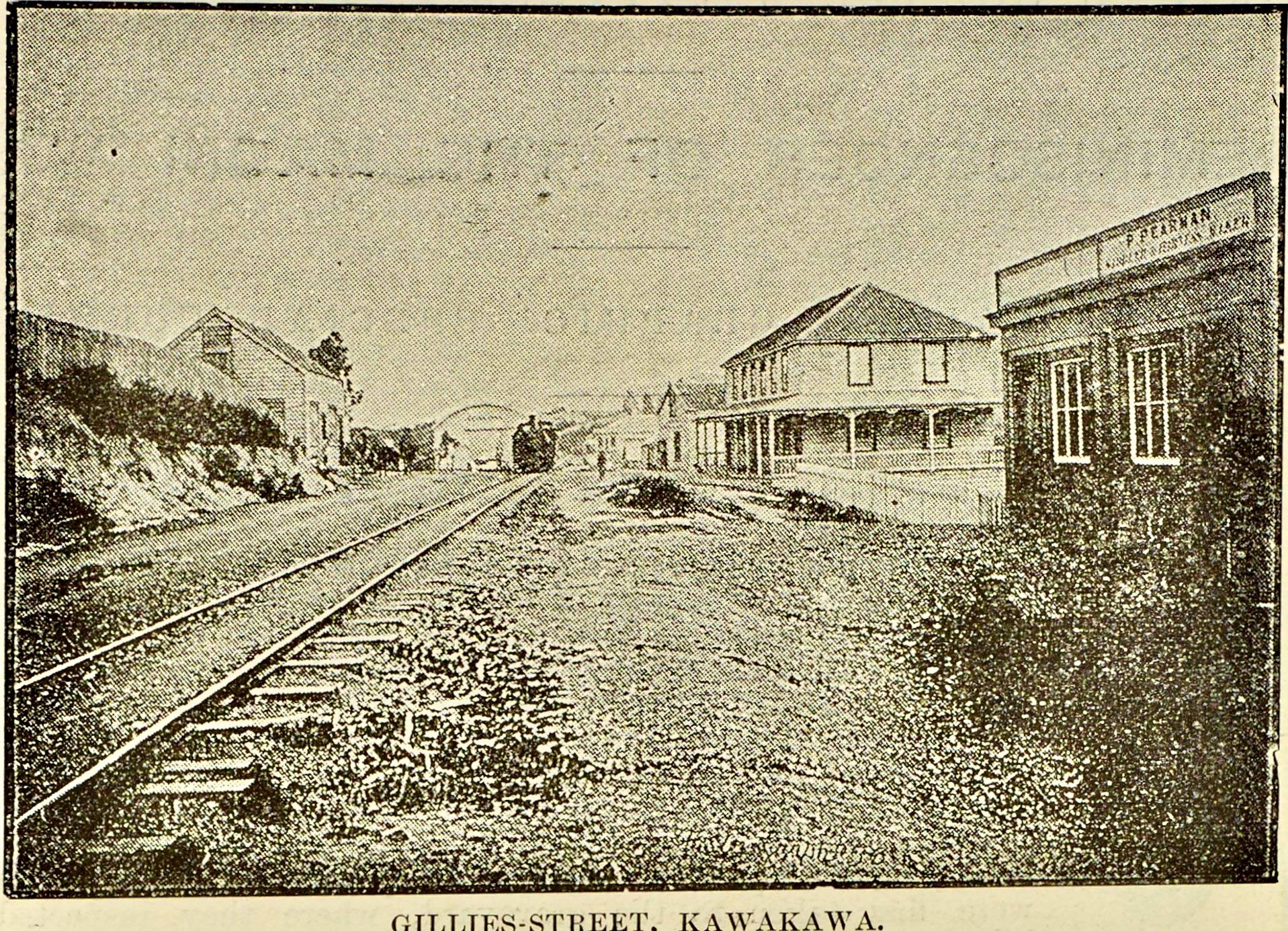
In 1891 the street at Kawakawa was part developed

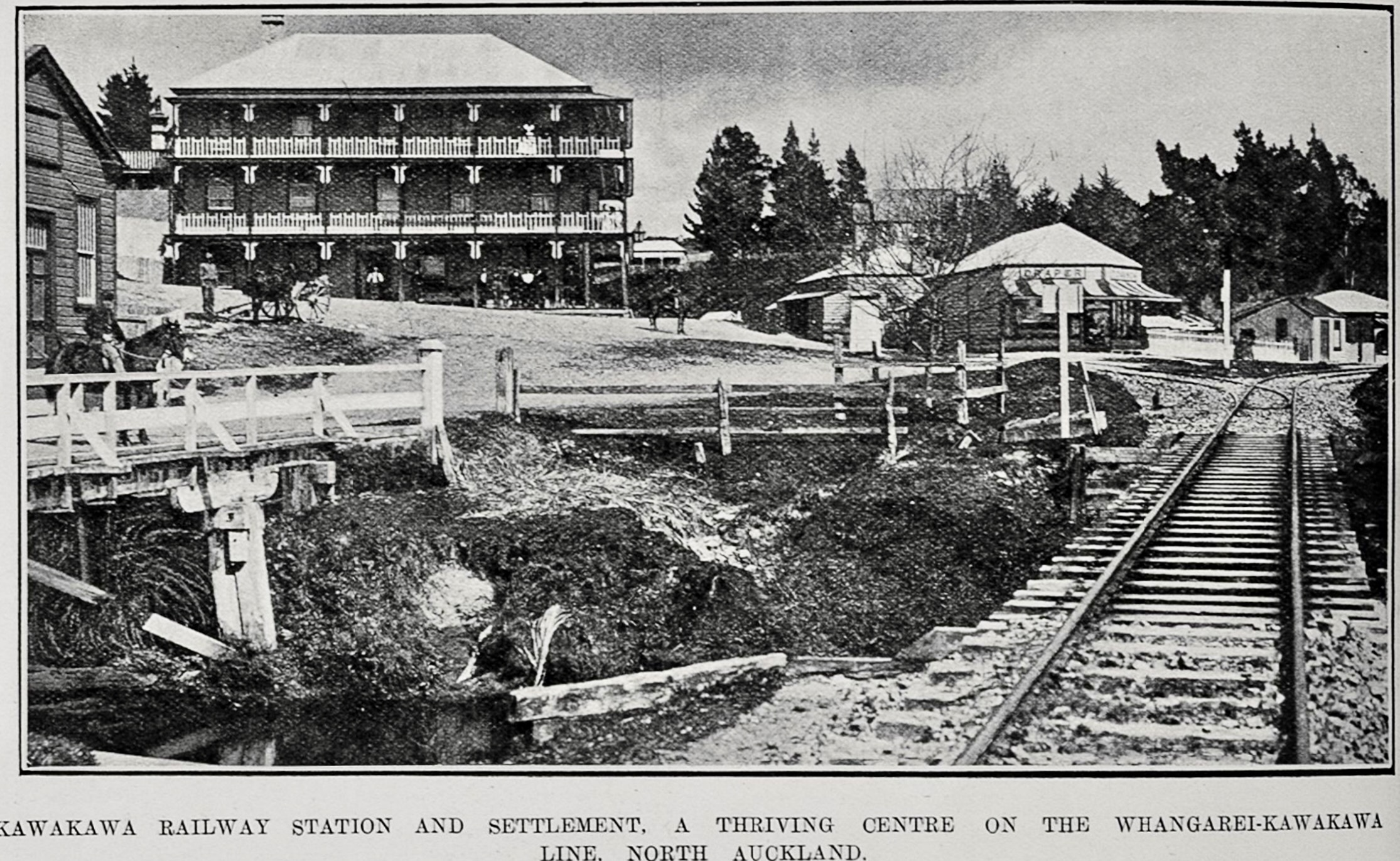
1908 the railway was beside a road (coal mine branch to the left)

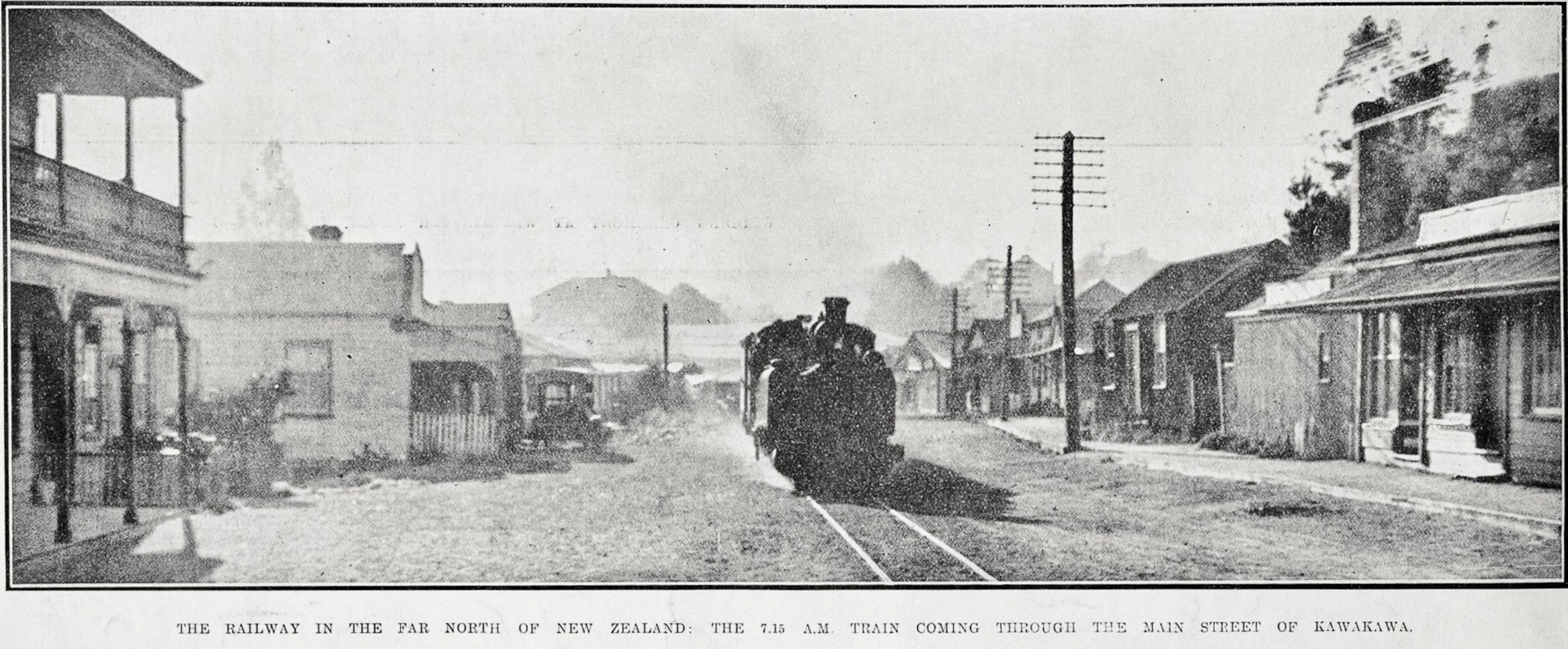
By 1922 the railway was in the centre of Gillies Street

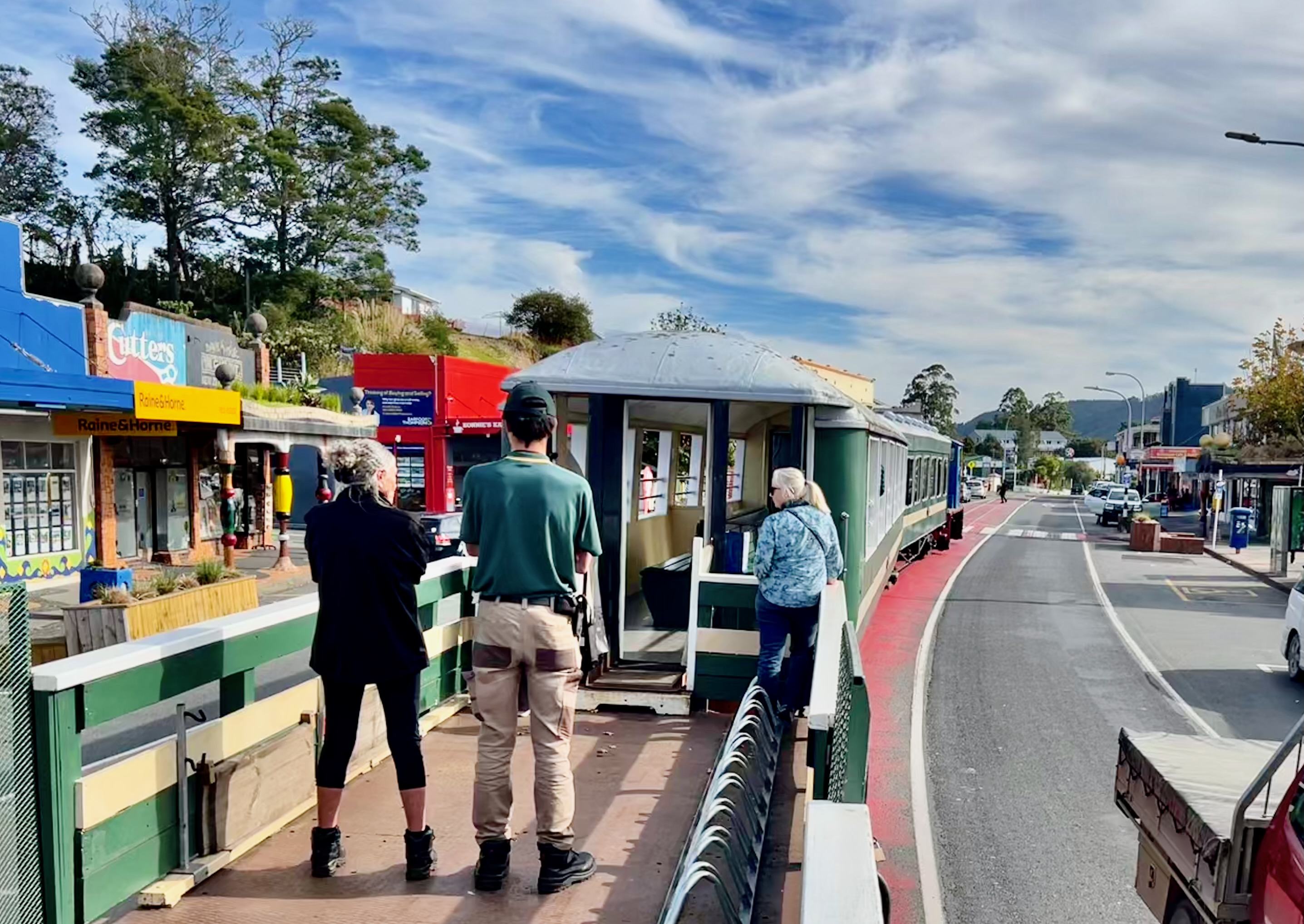
Kawakawa in 2024

=== Decline and revival ===
The coal mine closed in 1912. The station was little changed until 1956, when a verandah (removed in 1992) was added for NZR buses. From 13 February 1981 the station was open only for parcels and goods traffic up to 25 kg (55 lb). After 1982 the goods shed was sold and by 1988 only the station building, platform and loop remained. The rails to Otiria were lifted in 1993. The Kawakawa–Opua line was leased to BoIVR from 1989.

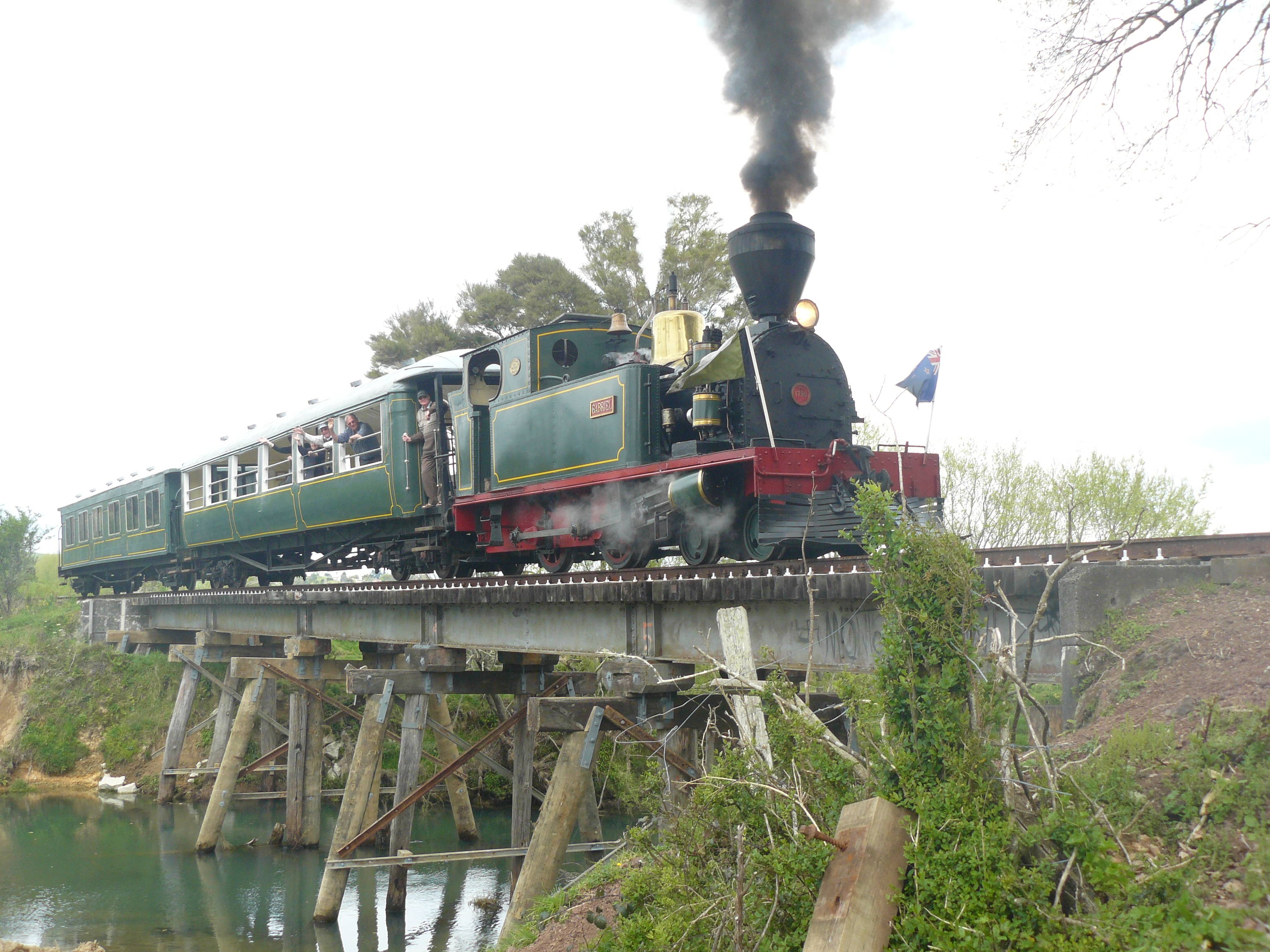
BoIVR's Gabriel on Bridge 5

== Bridge 5 ==
A timber pier of the bridge over the Tirohanga Stream had to be replaced after a flood in 2014.

== Cycle Trail ==
Pou Herenga Tai – Twin Coast Cycle Trail opened at the end of 2016, using the trackbed to Otiria on the west and running beside the railway to Taumarere on the east.
