= Kawakawa, New Zealand =

Town in Northland, New Zealand

Kawakawa
- Town
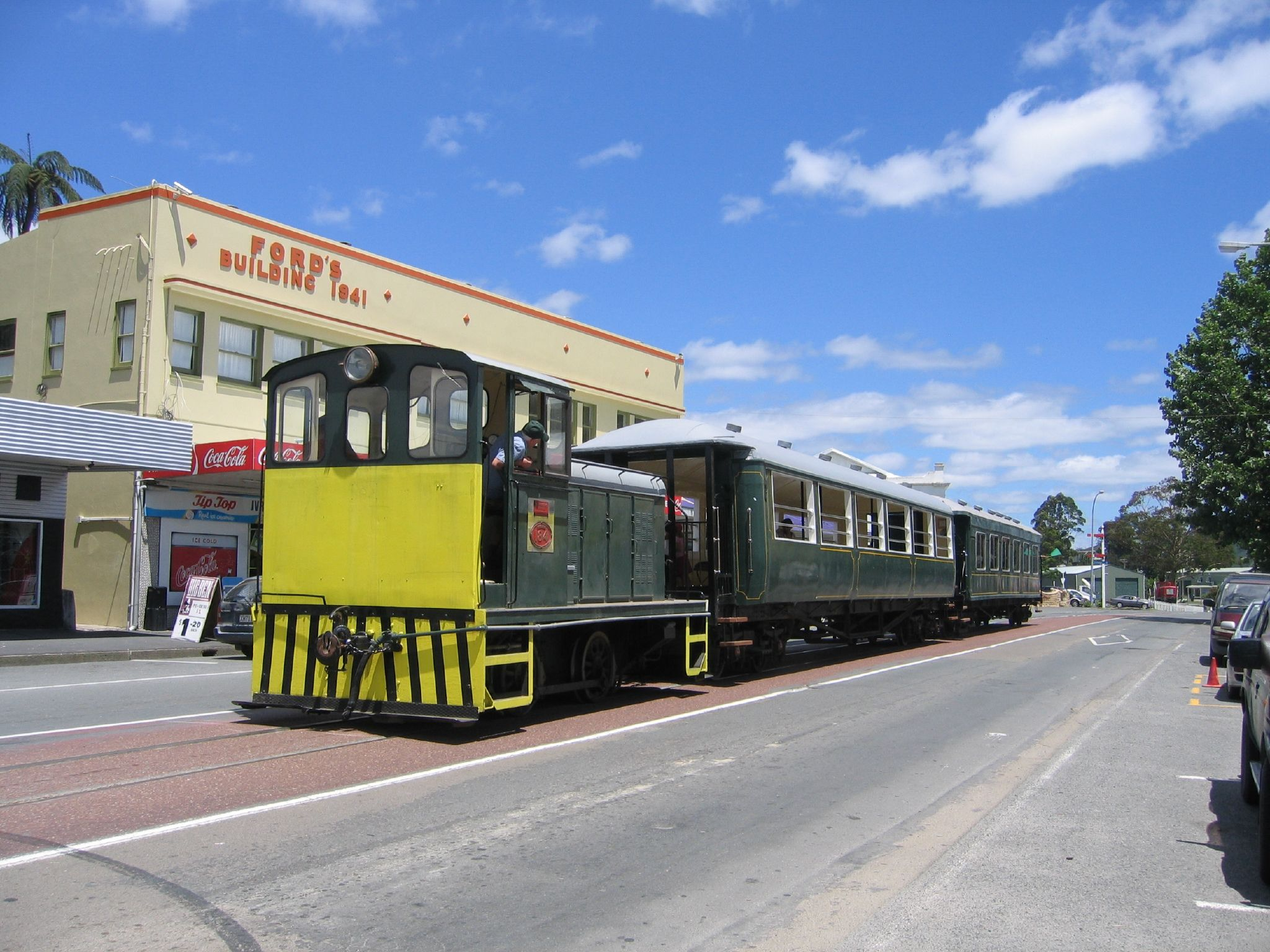
- The main street of Kawakawa
- Nickname: Train Town
- Interactive map of Kawakawa
- Coordinates: 35°22′48″S 174°4′8″E
- Country: New Zealand
- Region: Northland Region
- District: Far North District
- Ward: Bay of Islands-Whangaroa Ward
- Community: Bay of Islands-Whangaroa
- Subdivision: Kawakawa-Moerewa
- Named for: kawakawa
- Electorates: Northland; Te Tai Tokerau

Government
  - Territorial Authority: Far North District Council
  - Regional council: Northland Regional Council
  - Mayor of Far North: Moko Tepania
  - Northland MP: Grant McCallum
  - Te Tai Tokerau MP: Mariameno Kapa-Kingi

Area
  - Total: 1.73 km^{2} (0.67 sq mi)

Population (June 2025)
  - Total: 1,500
  - Density: 870/km^{2} (2,200/sq mi)
- Postcode(s): 0210

Kawakawa is a small town in the Bay of Islands area of the Northland Region of New Zealand. Kawakawa developed as a service town when coal was found there in the 1860s, but coal mining ceased in the early 20th century. The economy is now based on farming. The town is named after the kawakawa shrub.

== History ==
In 1859, Maihi Paraone Kawiti petitioned Governor Thomas Gore Browne for European settlers to establish a town in the area. Browne was pleased at Kawiti's offer but preferred for Kerikeri to be developed instead. Two years later, coal was discovered and after tests found it to be of the highest quality the government purchased 24,000 acres (9,700 ha) from local Māori. The town of Kawakawa was built around the coal mines A horse-drawn tramway was opened in 1868 to carry coal from the mines to the Taumarere wharf. In 1871 two steam locomotives were acquired and the tramway was upgraded to railway standard. In 1884 a railway line from Kawakawa to Opua was opened, and this replaced the line to Taumarere wharf. The area was a location for the late 19th/early 20th century kauri gum digging trade.

By 1899 there were over 300 residents in the town, which was built mainly on the hillside near the coalmine. In March 1899 a fire destroyed many of the buildings. The town was rebuilt on the flat, alongside the railway tracks. The present railway station was opened in 1911 on the line to Moerewa, at the junction with the mine branch.

A railway line south to Whangārei was completed in 1911. Coal mining ceased at Kawakawa in the early 20th century due to the mines flooding. Since the closure the main economic activities are farming and tourism.

The Bay of Islands County headquarters were in Kawakawa until the county was disestablished in 1989.

== Demographics ==
Kawakawa covers 1.73 km^{2} (0.67 sq mi) and had an estimated population of 1,500 as of June 2025, with a population density of 867 people per km^{2}.

Historical population
Year	Pop.	±% p.a.
2006	1,326	—
2013	1,215	−1.24%
2018	1,464	+3.80%
2023	1,482	+0.24%

Kawakawa had a population of 1,482 in the 2023 New Zealand census, an increase of 18 people (1.2%) since the 2018 census, and an increase of 267 people (22.0%) since the 2013 census. There were 729 males, 750 females and 6 people of other genders in 465 dwellings. 2.0% of people identified as LGBTIQ+. The median age was 34.2 years (compared with 38.1 years nationally). There were 363 people (24.5%) aged under 15 years, 276 (18.6%) aged 15 to 29, 660 (44.5%) aged 30 to 64, and 177 (11.9%) aged 65 or older.

People could identify as more than one ethnicity. The results were 45.3% European (Pākehā), 71.1% Māori, 6.9% Pasifika, 5.7% Asian, and 1.2% other, which includes people giving their ethnicity as "New Zealander". English was spoken by 96.2%, Māori language by 26.9%, Samoan by 0.8%, and other languages by 6.7%. No language could be spoken by 1.8% (e.g. too young to talk). New Zealand Sign Language was known by 0.4%. The percentage of people born overseas was 10.7, compared with 28.8% nationally.

Religious affiliations were 32.2% Christian, 2.0% Hindu, 1.0% Islam, 5.7% Māori religious beliefs, 0.2% New Age, 0.2% Jewish, and 1.4% other religions. People who answered that they had no religion were 52.2%, and 5.9% of people did not answer the census question.

Of those at least 15 years old, 120 (10.7%) people had a bachelor's or higher degree, 663 (59.2%) had a post-high school certificate or diploma, and 306 (27.3%) people exclusively held high school qualifications. The median income was $33,000, compared with $41,500 nationally. 48 people (4.3%) earned over $100,000 compared to 12.1% nationally. The employment status of those at least 15 was that 549 (49.1%) people were employed full-time, 132 (11.8%) were part-time, and 78 (7.0%) were unemployed.

== Features ==
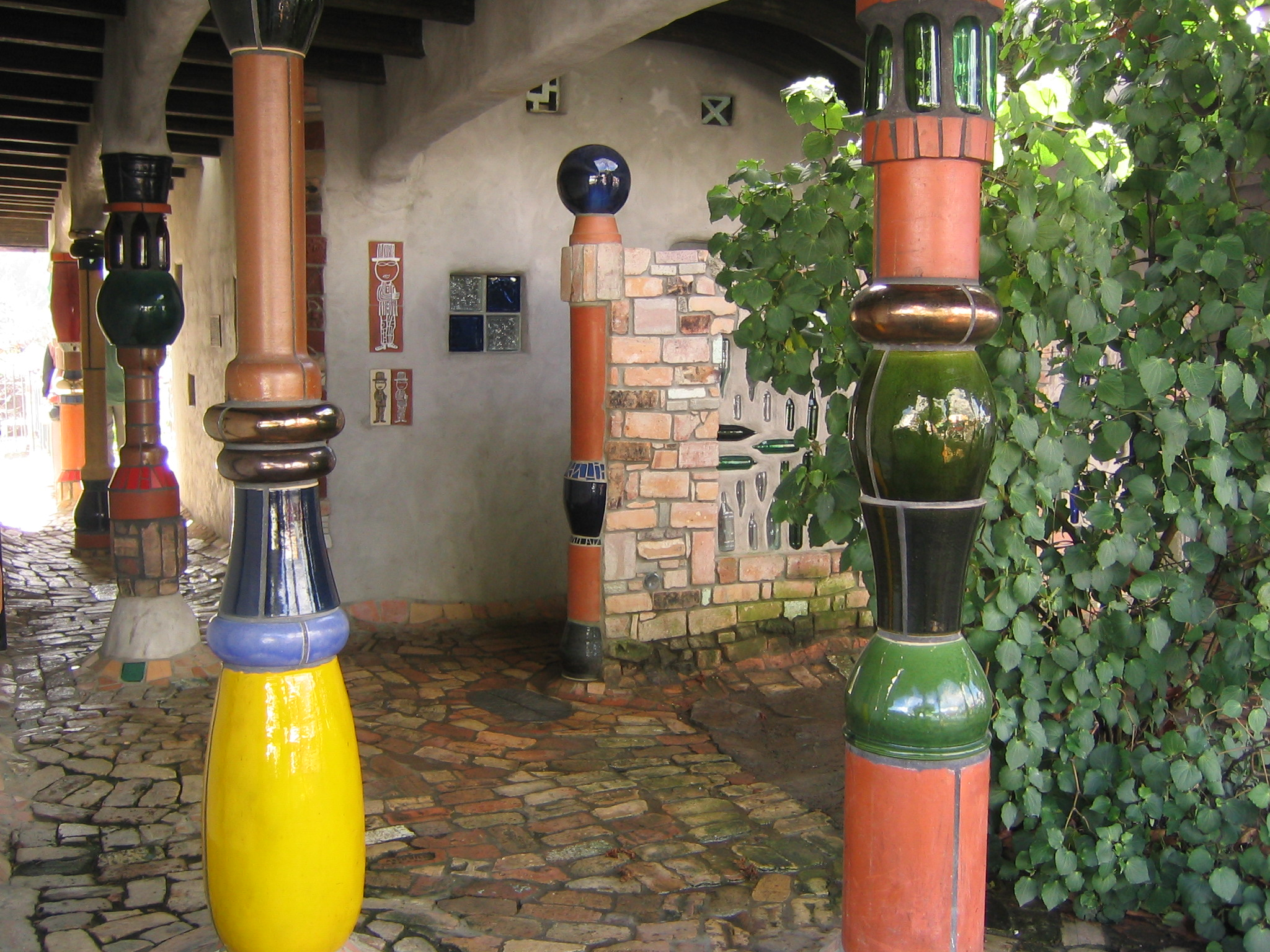
Entrance to the Hundertwasser toilet building

The town is known as "Train Town", because the Bay of Islands Vintage Railway runs down the middle of its main street on the former Opua Branch railway line. 8 kilometres (5.0 mi) of the 17 kilometres (11 mi) track reopened in 2008. Pou Herenga Tai – Twin Coast Cycle Trail follows part of the railway.

The town is also famous for its Hundertwasser toilet block, designed by Austrian artist Friedensreich Hundertwasser, who was a resident of the town from 1975 until his death in 2000.

The Kawiti glowworm caves at nearby Waiomio are also an attraction.

== Education ==
Kawakawa Primary School is a full primary (years 1–8) school with a roll of 236 students.

Bay of Islands College is a secondary (years 9–13) school with a roll of 486 students. It takes students from around the Bay of Islands and middle Northland, with 85% of its students travelling daily by bus to attend.

Te Mirumiru Early Childhood Education Centre, adjacent to the Kawakawa Office, includes bilingual units teaching in Māori language. Similarly, Te Kōhanga Reo o Kawakawa is a whānau-driven early childhood Kōhanga reo. Both schools are coeducational. Rolls are as of July 2026.

Karetu School is located nearby, in Karetu.

== Notable people ==
- Terryann Clark – professor
- Kelvin Davis – politician
- Jack Goodhue – rugby player
- Pita Paraone – politician
- Willow-Jean Prime – politician
- Joe Schmidt – rugby coach
- Noma Shepherd – community leader
- Telusa Veainu – rugby player
- Portia Woodman-Wickliffe – rugby player
