= Te Akeake railway station =

Defunct railway station in New Zealand

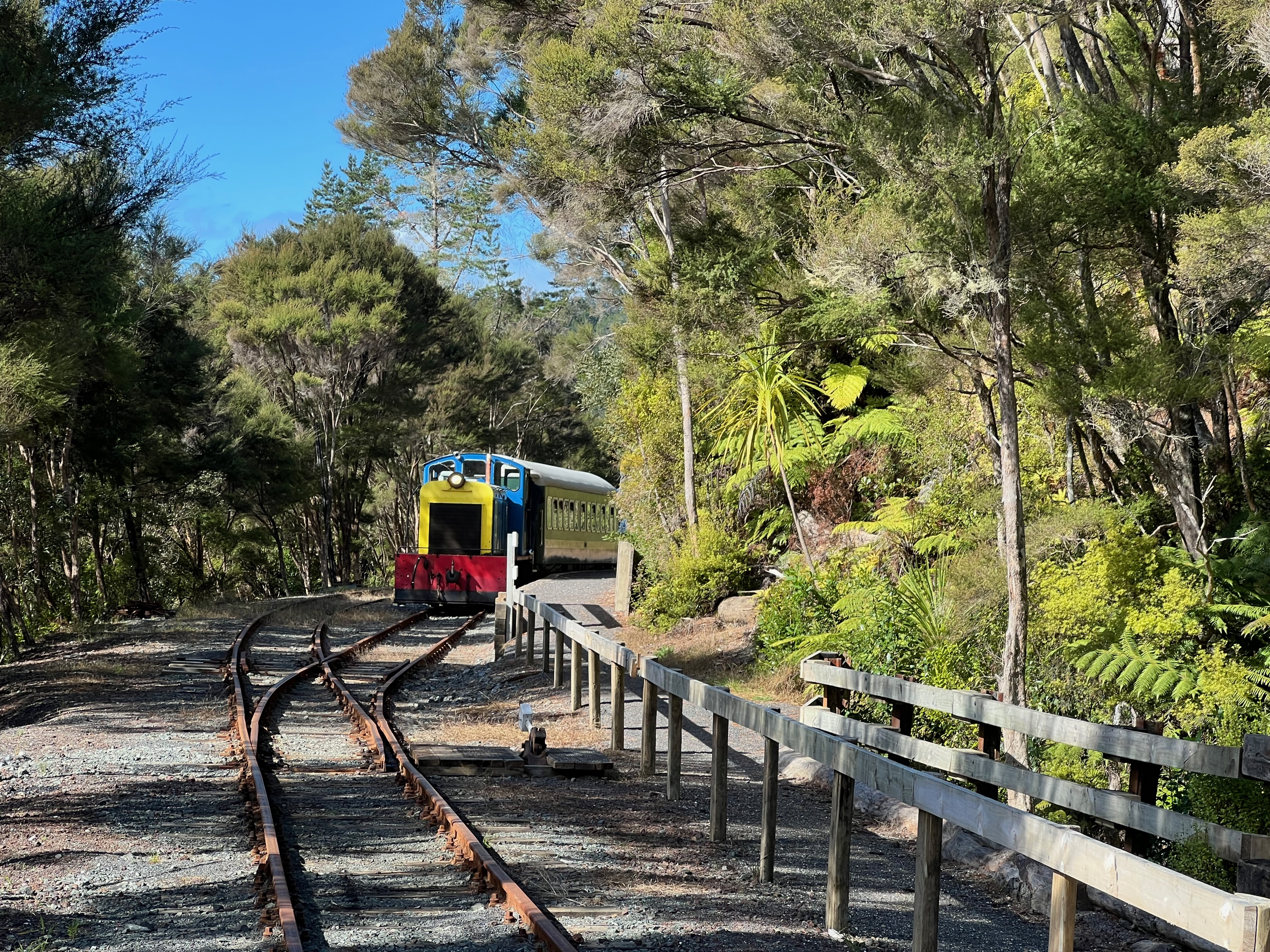
- Te Akeake railway station in 2024

General information
- Location: New Zealand
- Coordinates: 35.3491°S 174.1081°E
- Line: Opua Branch
- Platforms: Yes
- Tracks: Single line

History
- Opened: 1888
- Closed: 1931

Services
Preceding station	Historical railways	Following station
Taumarere; Line open, station open 1 mi 44 ch (2.5 km) towards Whangārei	Opua Branch; NZR distances in 1909	Opua; Line closed, station closed 3 mi 50 ch (5.8 km) towards Opua
Location

Te Akeake railway station is a station on the Opua Branch in New Zealand.

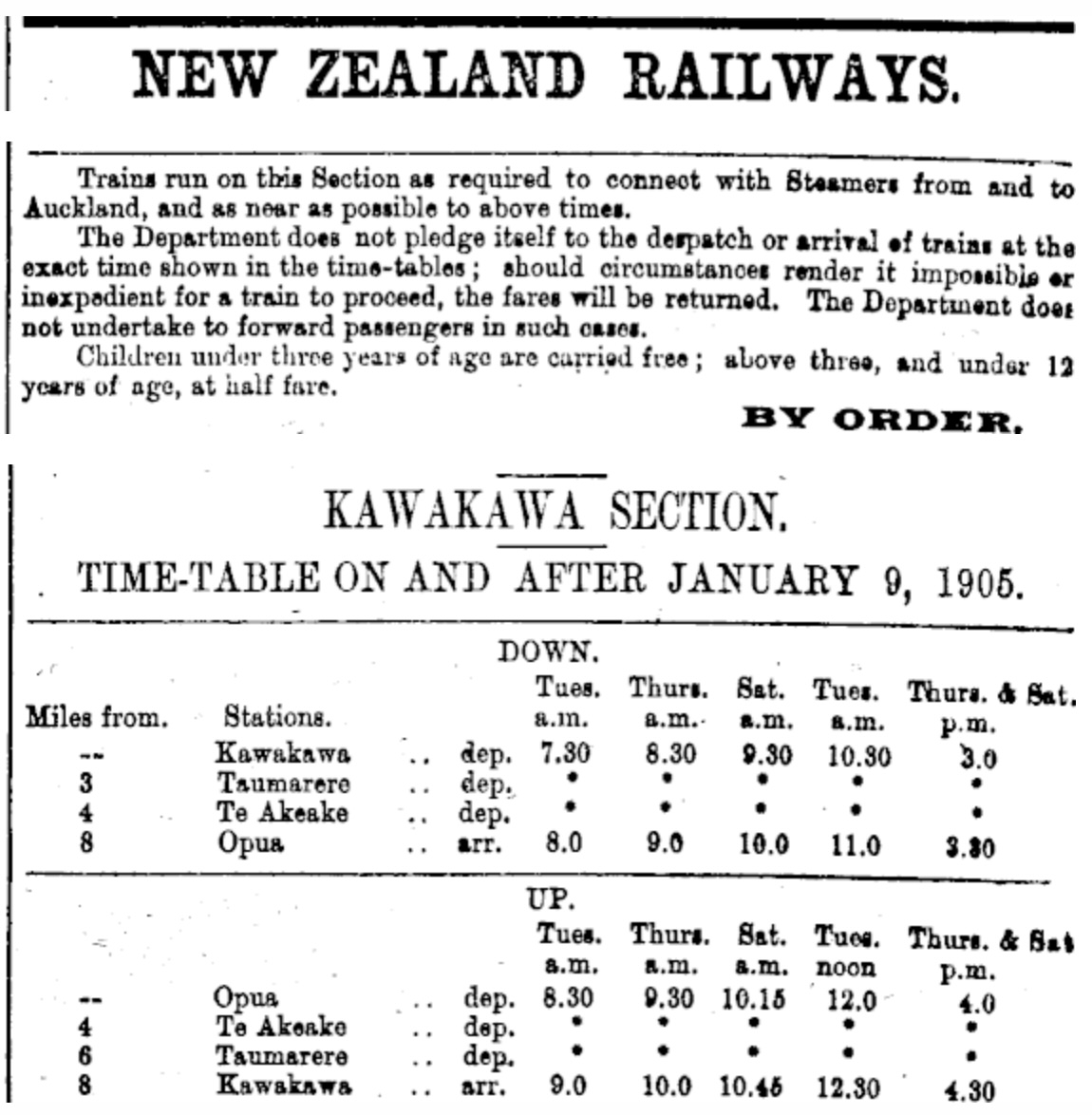
NZR 1905 Opua timetable

The station, sometimes named Teakeake, opened after an application for a stopping place, 1.5 mi (2.4 km) from Taumarere, was made on 7 July 1888. About 1898, after an "application from natives", on 28 December 1893, a shelter shed and platform were built. It closed on 14 August 1931 and remained closed, when the platform was moved north from 3 mi 63 ch (6.1 km) from Kawakawa, by about 900 m (980 yd). The repositioned station reopened in December 2022 as a new terminal for the Bay of Islands Vintage Railway (BoIVR).

== Whangae Bridge ==
An 1883 account described a station being built between the tunnel and the bridge over the Whāngae River. It also said the banks were being washed away until stone facings were added to them.

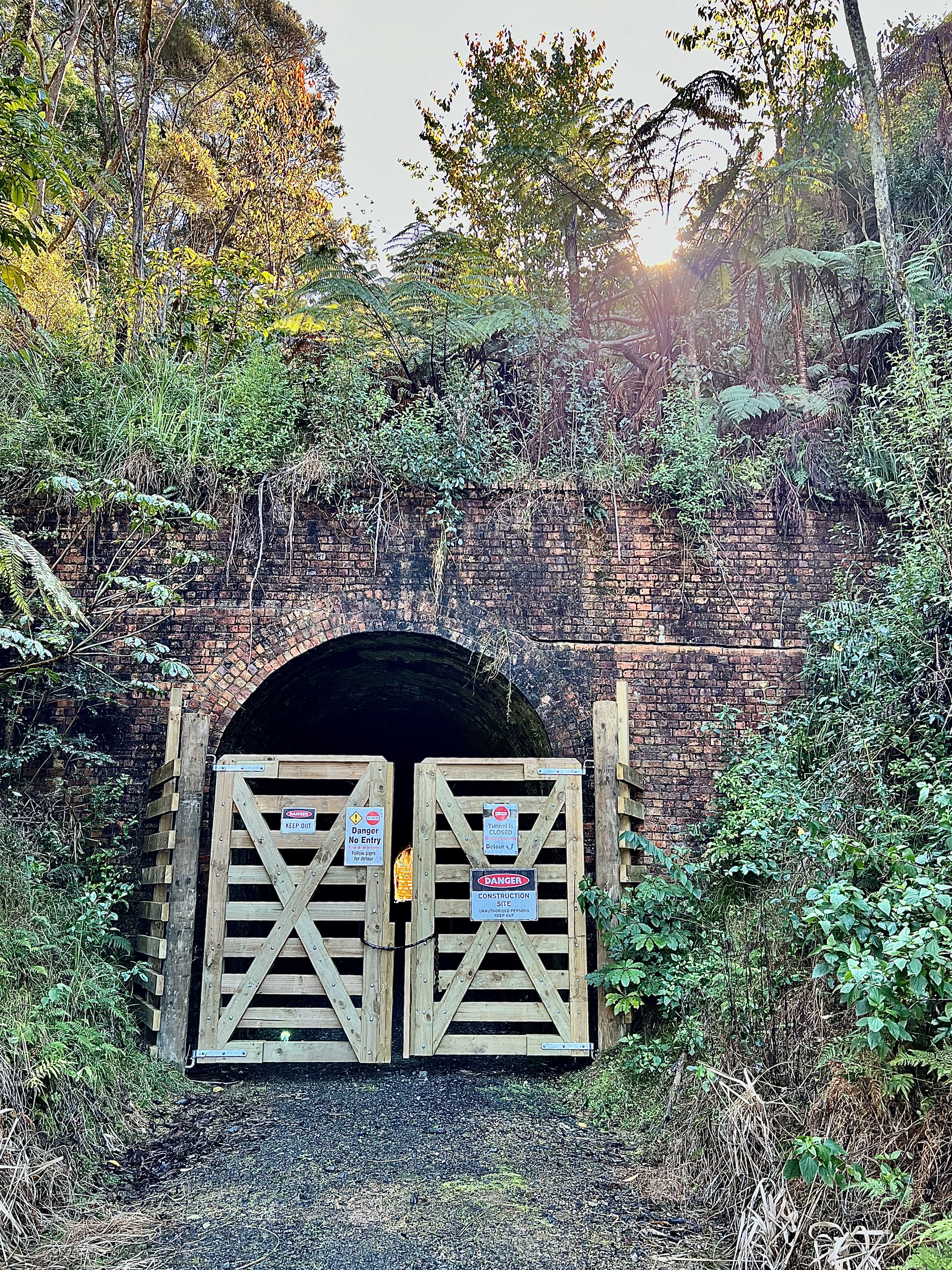
Whangae Tunnel south portal in 2024

From 14 August 1931 Te Akeake was replaced as a flag station by Whangae Bridge, on the other side of the 264 ft (80 m), or 93 yd (85 m) Opua Tunnel 14, or Whangae Tunnel. Opua Tunnel was closed by a slip in 1936. The station closed on 1 September 1963. For the Cycle Trail a steeply graded bypass has been built around the tunnel.

It was 2 mi 34 ch (3.9 km) from the station it replaced, 1 mi 27 ch (2.2 km) from Opua, 4 mi 01 ch (6.5 km) from Taumarere and 51 mi 60 ch (83.3 km) from Whangārei, had a shelter shed and was served by the Auckland–Opua Northland Express.

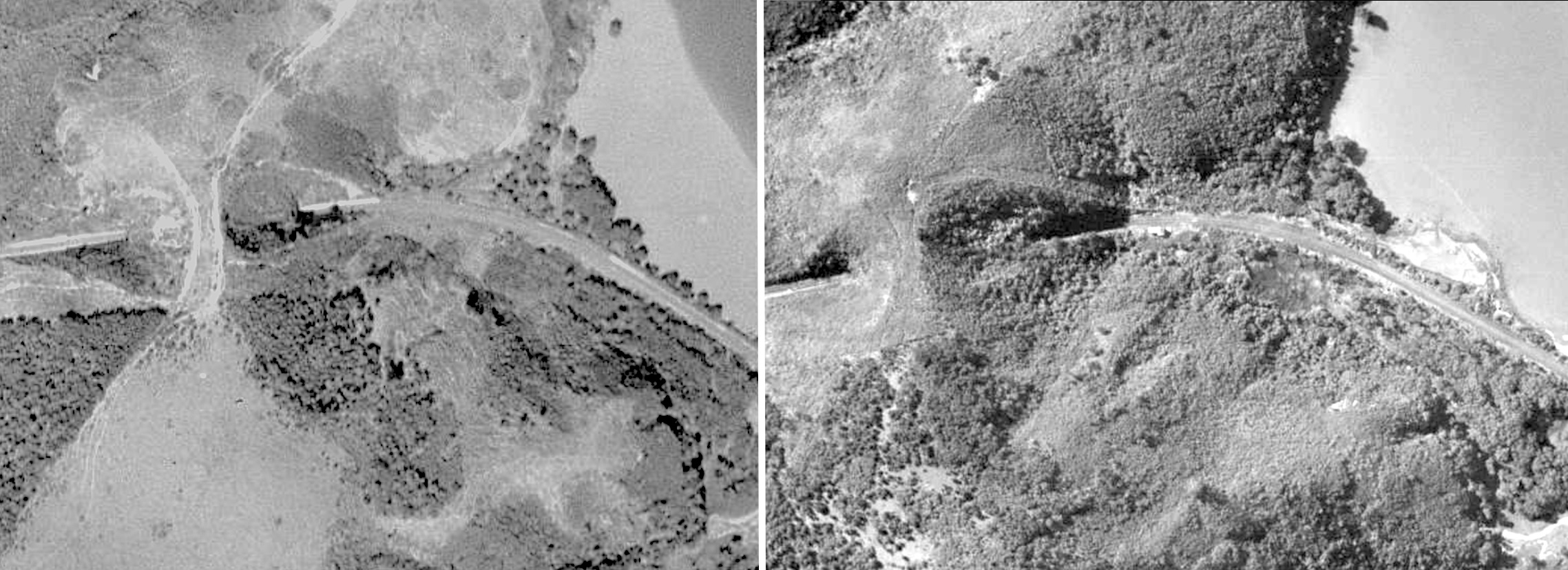
1964 derailment site (centre right) visible in 1971 (right), but not in 1955

=== Incidents ===
In 1964 a man died when a locomotive took a corner too fast and toppled into the water, just south of the tunnel. A temporary siding was built to get the engines out of the creek. The works were still in place in 2018.

On Saturday 26 June 1999, near the same location, a Vintage Railway steam train from Opua to Kawakawa was derailed at low speed when the track spread. The safety report said track maintenance was inadequate.

== Cycle trail ==
Pou Herenga Tai – Twin Coast Cycle Trail opened along the rail line between Kawakawa and Ōpua in 2017.

Taumarere (Long Bridge)-Te Ake Ake closed in 2021 to dig the rails out from under the trail, using $5.59m from the COVID-19 Response and Recovery Fund. Kawakawa-Ōpua is leased from KiwiRail by BoIVR, which sublet the Ōpua-Taumarere to Far North District Council for the cycle trail until it was ready to extend the railway. The Ōpua-Te Ake Ake section of the trail reopened on 26 December 2022. Cyclists and walkers can use a train for a gold coin donation. A cycle trail alongside the railway is planned, when the line is reopened to Opua.
