= Opua Branch =

Railway line in New Zealand

Coordinates: 35.36°S 174.096°E

Map

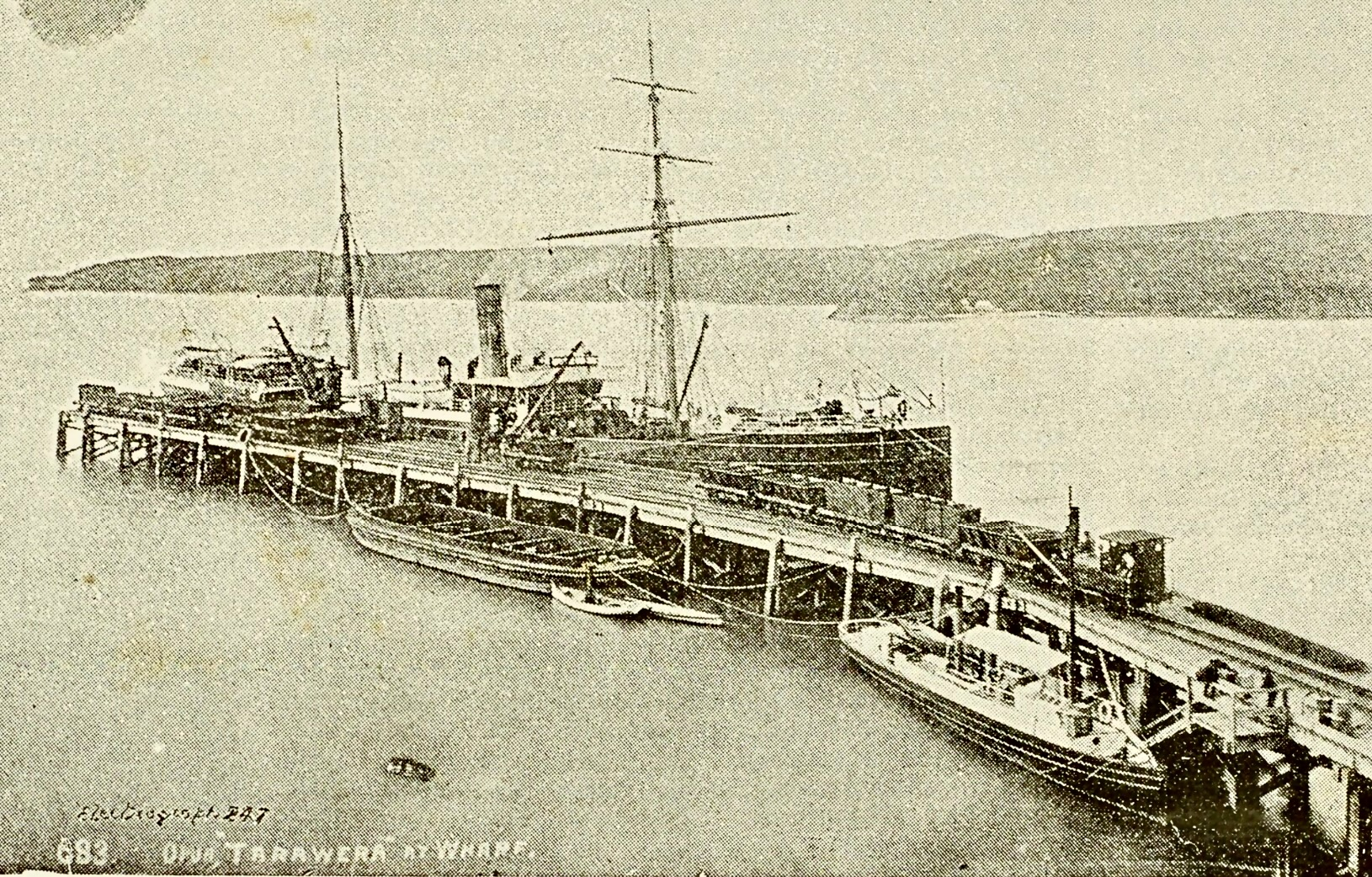
Opua, Tarawera at wharf about 1891

The Opua Branch or Otiria-Opua Industrial Line, partially still operational as the Bay of Islands Vintage Railway, is a former section of the North Auckland Line in the Northland Region of New Zealand, between Otiria and the Bay of Islands township of Opua. The first section was constructed as a bush tramway in 1867 and converted to a railway in the next decade. Today the railway is partially used by the Bay of Islands Vintage Railway, which runs tourist services between Kawakawa and Te Akeake. The line's centrepiece is the section where it runs down along the main street of Kawakawa.

== Construction ==
Coal was discovered at Kawakawa in 1864. Rails and wagons from the Auckland & Drury railway were used for a 1,435 mm (4 ft 8 1/2 in) gauge, horse-drawn tramway from the mine to the Derrick wharf on the Kawakawa River at Taumarere. The tramway opened on 26 December 1867 and was completed on 16 January 1868, after which the mine was transferred to the newly formed Bay of Islands Coal Company. Horses and the wooden tramway line were replaced on 28 January 1871 by the first steam engine to run in the North Island. Puffing Billy, a vertical boilered (85 psi (590 kPa) to 100 psi (690 kPa)), 8 ton, 12 hp (8.9 kW), 0-4-0 locomotive, built in April 1870 to the order of G.E. Stevenson of Liverpool for export by Alexander Chaplin and Company, Cranstonhill Engine Works, Glasgow, believed to be maker's No. 1182. The two cylinders (6in x 13in) were vertically mounted, ahead of the boiler, and drove a geared (1:2) crank shaft on an axle. The 3 ft 1 in (0.94 m) diameter driving wheels were coupled by circular section side rods. The wheelbase was 6 ft 4 in (1.93 m) and overall length 13 ft 3 in (4.04 m). It had been expected that the engine would be able to haul almost 100 tons, but it needed much repair and could only haul 8 tons. It was sold to the Tararu tramway company and altered to their 3 ft 6in gauge by Fraser and Tinné, who delivered it to Thames on 2 December 1871. In 1871 approval was given to extend the tramway from Taumarere to Opua. In 1874 Bay of Islands Coal Company agreed with Auckland Province that the government would take over the tramway and build the extension. The line was closed from 2 to 11 December 1876 to allow for it to be converted to 3 ft 6 in gauge., the newly established national gauge. Work on the Kawakawa River viaduct and first mile of the extension to Opua was completed in April 1881, a contract was let on 10 December 1880 for the remaining 4 mi 11 ch (6.7 km) and a start was made in June 1881, but it was not until October 1883 that authority was sought for a solid platform at the station, which was rebuilt before the extension opened. In 1876, a settlement with a deepwater port had been proposed, and in 1881 plans for a town named "Newport" were published. It became known as Opua and the railway from Kawakawa opened on 7 April 1884. The spur to Taumarere wharf was no longer necessary, as Opua's port was far superior, and the 38 chains (2,500 ft; 760 m) to the Derrick Wharf closed. The company declined an offer to run the line, as it did not wish to raise more capital, so the track was operated by New Zealand Railways Department. The company sold the tramway to the government and paid 6% of the total cost of the line to lease it back.

It was some time before the isolated Kawakawa – Opua line was connected to the rest of the national rail network. There were questions over its viability, but in 1899 parliament approved a connection with the line that was progressing north from Whangārei. A line 44 kilometres in length was required to link Kawakawa to the Whangārei section's northern railhead in Waiotu, and factors such as poor winter weather and difficulties in accessing the construction due to the relative isolation of the region at the time meant that it was not until 1911 that the rails from each end met.

In 1925, the North Auckland Line was finally completed and the Whangārei – Opua section was linked to the national network.

== Stations ==
These were the stations on the Otiria-Opua section of the North Auckland Line:

| Station | Distance from Otiria | Notes |
|---|---|---|
| Moerewa | 3.46 km (2.15 mi) | |
| Kawakawa | 7.22 km (4.49 mi) | |
| Taumarere | 10.36 km (6.44 mi) | |
| Te Akeake | 13.32 km (8.28 mi) | Whangae Bridge replaced Te Akeake from 14 August 1931 |
| Whangae Bridge | 16.61 km (10.32 mi) | Whangae Bridge replaced Te Akeake from 14 August 1931 |
| Opua | 18.29 km (11.36 mi) | |

== Operation ==
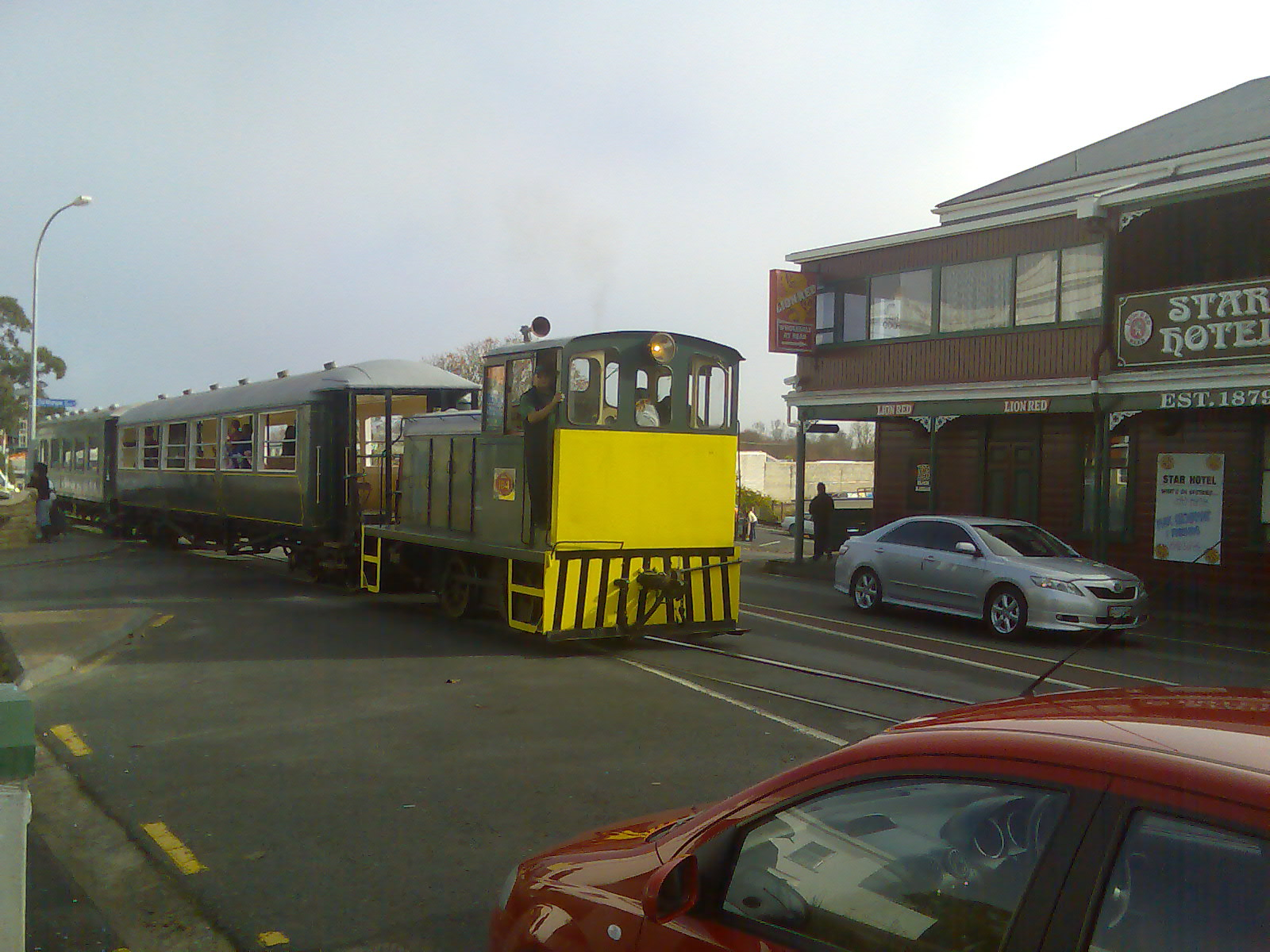
A Bay of Islands Vintage Railway train hauled by a TR class shunting locomotive along the main street of Kawakawa

In the tramway days and the first years of the line, the predominant traffic was coal from Kawakawa for export. By the late 1890s coal traffic had all but disappeared and the government initially expressed a desire to remove the line. Local indignation was such that instead of removing the line, it was connected to Whangārei and then the national network.

When the North Auckland Line was fully opened in 1925, the Opua Express passenger train operated thrice weekly from Auckland to Opua. Freight did not operate directly to Auckland; it was conveyed to and from Whangārei, with other services operating south. Some trains were mixed trains, conveying both passengers and freight.

In November 1956, railcars replaced the Opua Express, operating to the other northern terminus of Okaihau on the Okaihau Branch, leaving Opua without any dedicated passenger trains. Passengers had to rely on mixed trains, which did not connect with the railcars. The mixed trains lasted another two decades while the railcars ceased operating in 1967). The last mixed train ran between Whangārei and Opua on 18 June 1976. From this time, this part was used to carry solely freight, almost all of which was output from the Moerewa Dairy Factory and Affco Meat Works to the port of Opua. By the 1980s, regular freight services beyond Kawakawa were becoming irregular due to the decline of shipping to Opua as a result of containerisation. It was last used in 1985 and leased to the Bay of Islands Vintage Railway to operate tourist passenger services from Opua to Kawakawa, including running down the centre of Kawakawa's main street.

The short stretch between Otiria and Kawakawa was retained as a link to the national network, but has since been dismantled and is now used as a footpath connecting Kawakawa with Moerewa (a disused siding terminates at Moerewa). The tourist trains operated between Kawakawa and Opua until 2001, when the Land Transport Safety Authority withdrew the line's operating licence, as deadlines for upgrading and repairs had not been met. Currently, operations run from Kawakawa, including the stretch down the main street, to Whangae Tunnel return to Kawakawa. The tunnel built 1880-84 is currently under monitoring with the engineering plans complete for restoration, fundraising is in progress with the Bay of Islands Vintage Railway. The terminus in Opua is on land now owned by Far North Holdings, the trading arm of Far North District Council, and negotiations are underway so that trains can return to Opua.

=== Cycleway ===
The 2009 plan for Pou Herenga Tai – Twin Coast Cycle Trail was that the Vintage Railway would carry cyclists 10.3 km (6.4 mi), between Opua (a new terminus at Colenso Triangle, 1.2 km (0.75 mi) from the original end of the line at Opua wharf) and Kawakawa, over 12 bridges and through a tunnel.

== See also ==
- Bay of Islands Vintage Railway
- North Auckland Line
- Dargaville Branch
- Donnellys Crossing Section/Branch
- Marsden Point Branch
- Ōkaihau Branch
- Onerahi Branch
