= Opua railway station =

Defunct railway station in New Zealand

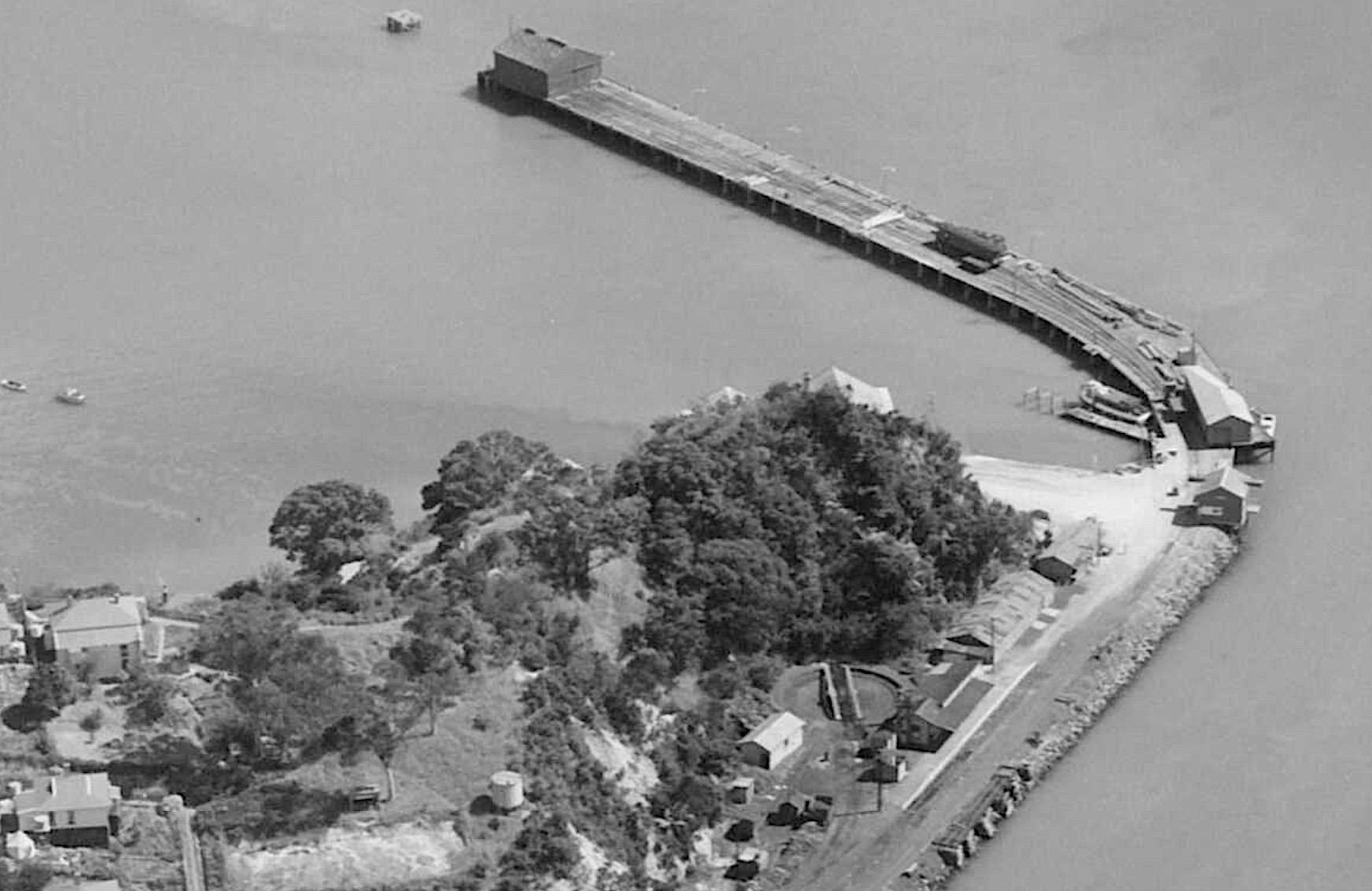
- Opua station and wharf in 1950

General information
- Location: New Zealand
- Coordinates: 35.313491°S 174.12123°E
- Elevation: 3 m (9.8 ft)
- Line: Opua Branch
- Distance: Westfield Junction 298.96 km (185.77 mi)

History
- Opened: 7 April 1884
- Closed: goods 18 September 1993 passengers 21 June 1976

Services
Preceding station	Historical railways	Following station
terminus	Opua Branch; KiwiRail	Whangae Bridge; Line closed, station closed 1.68 km (1.04 mi)
Location

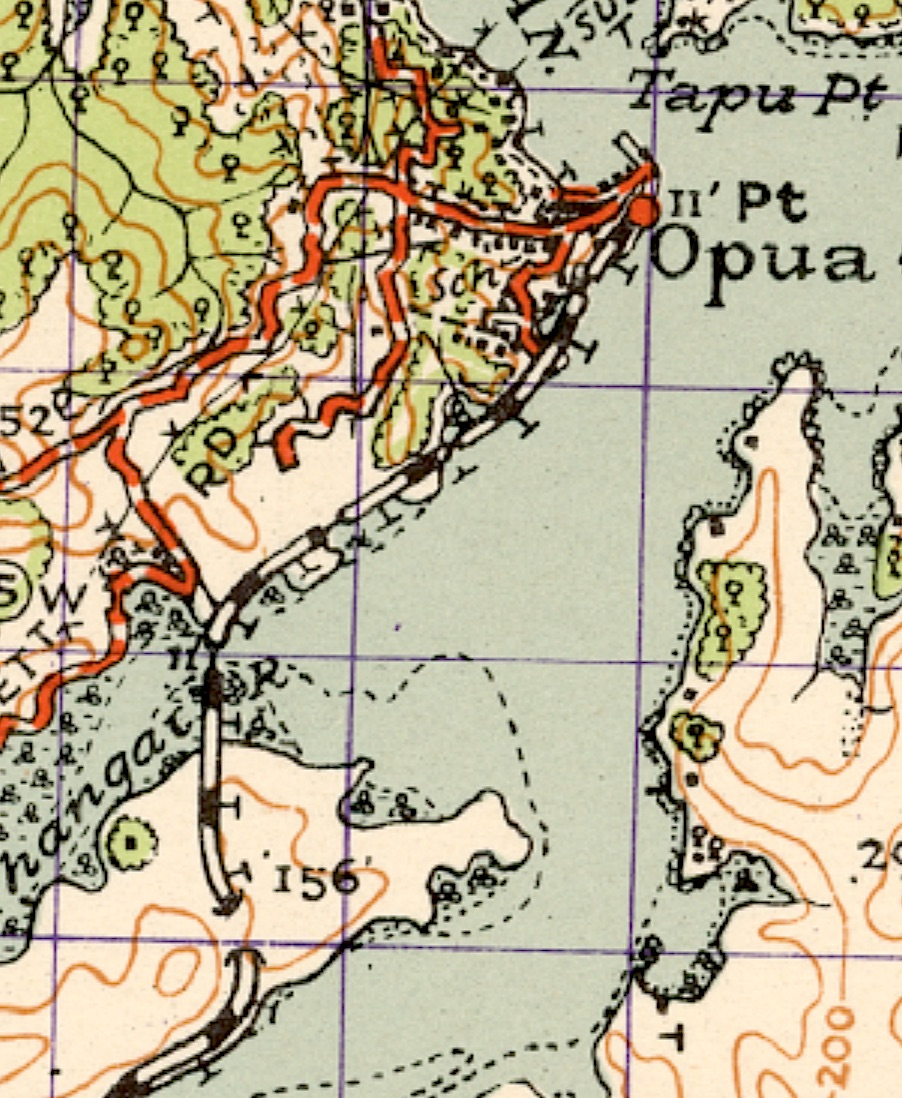
Opua 1942 one inch map

Opua railway station was a station on the Opua Branch in New Zealand, serving the port of Opua.

It had a 5th class station, passenger platform, crane, stationmaster's house, urinals, a 40 ft (12 m) x 30 ft (9.1 m) goods shed and an engine shed. In 1940 the turntable was lengthened to 62 ft (19 m). There was a Post Office at the station from 1884 until 1968.

There were railway lines on the wharf from at least 1895 until 11 April 1978, when sleepers were placed to prevent access to wharf as it was unsafe. On 13 February 1981 the station closed to all but private siding traffic.

When the North Auckland Line was fully opened in 1925, the Opua Express passenger train operated thrice weekly from Auckland to Opua. From November 1956 Opua was served only by mixed trains between Whangarei and Opua, the last running on 18 June 1976. The station, and a large part of the cliff behind it, was demolished between 1966 and 1973 and a new station built in 1969. Moerewa Dairy Factory and Affco Meat Works used the railway for export via Opua until 1985. The line was leased to the Bay of Islands Vintage Railway from 1989 until 2001, when the Land Transport Safety Authority withdrew the line's operating licence.
