= Closed schools in the Northland Region =

This is a list of schools which once operated in Northland, New Zealand, but no longer exist. The list is not comprehensive for schools closed before 1999.

== Far North District ==
Name	Area	Founded	Closed	Comments
Awarua School	Awarua			Extant 1998
Kaitaia Abundant Life School	Kaitaia	1988	2023	
Kerikeri Christian Community School	Kerikeri		2005	
Makora School	Whangape Harbour	1894	1896	
Orauta School	Orauta		2005	
Otiria School	Otiria		2005	
Puketi School	Whangape Harbour	1894	1896	
Rotokakahi Native/Maori School	Whangape Harbour	1918	c. 1969	
Takahue School	Takahue	1888	1973	
Te Kura Kaupapa Māori o Rangiawhia	Whatuwhiwhi		2016	
Te Kura o Awarua	Awarua		2005	
Te Kura o Hata Maria o Pawarenga	Whangape Harbour	1927	2020	Replaced by Te Kura ā Iwi o Pawarenga
Te Kura o Matawaia	Matawaia		2005	
Towai School	Towai		2005	
Waikare School	Waikare		2004	
Waimate North Christian School	Waimate North		2005	
Whangape Native School	Whangape	1881	1976	Merged with Herekino School

== Whangarei District ==
Name	Area	Founded	Closed	Comments
Breakthrough Education Centre	Kamo		2005	
Bream Tail School	Bream Tail		before 1930	
Helena Bay School	Helena Bay		2005	
Hukerenui District High School	Hūkerenui	1957	1972	
Jordan School	Jordan	1892	1938	
Marsden Christian School	Marsden Bay		2005	
Marsden Point School	Marsden Bay	1914	c.1928	
Ngaiotonga Valley School	Ngaiotonga		2005	
North River School	Waipu		1940	
Otakairanga School	Otakairanga		1949	
Parakao School	Parakao	1912	2000	
Puhipuhi School	Puhipuhi	1919	1964	
Punaruku School	Punaruku		2005	
Raumanga Primary School	Raumanga		2002	
Richard Fleet's School	Ruakākā	1860s	early 1880s	
Riponui Pah School	Riponui Pah	1895	1945	
Riponui Valley School	Riponui Valley	1920	1948	
Ruatangata West School	Rautangata West		1973	
Takahiwai Maori Primary School	Takahiwai	1899	1973	
Tapuha School	Tapuha	1893	1947	
The Braigh School	Waipu		1940	
Waipu Caves School	Waipu		1940	
Waipu Centre School	Waipu		1940	became site for Waipu District High School.
Waipu Cove School	Waipu Cove		1940	
Waipu District High School	Waipu	1940	1972	split to Waipu School and Bream Bay College.
Whakapara School	Whakapara	1899	1955	The school moved in 1922, with the Whakapara Maori School continuing in the old premises.
Whakapara Maori School	Whakapara		1964	

== Kaipara District ==
Name	Area	Founded	Closed	Comments
Albertland North School		1873		
Aoroa Primary School	Aoroa		1938	
Aratapu District High School	Aratapu	1902	1928	
Aratapu School	Aratapu	1874		
Avoca School	Avoca	1898		
Awaroa School	Awaroa		1929	
Batley School	Batley		1939	
Brynderwyn School	Brynderwyn		1937	
Grahams Fern School	Grahams Fern		1952–53	
Hoanga School	Hoanga	1901		
Mamaranui Primary	Mamaranui			fl. 1960s
Marehemo School	Marehemo		1937	
Maropiu District High School	Maropiu		1973	
Naumai School	Naumai	1893	1929	
North Wairoa School				fl 1875.
Okahu School	Okahu		1948	
Omaru School	Omaru			fl 1879
Oruawharo School	Oruawharo	1928	2001	
Parore School	Parore		1952–53	
Redhill School	Redhill	1886	1937	
Rehia School	Rehia	1891		
Raupo School	Raupo	1900	1929	Seemingly amalgamated into Raupo Consolidated District High School, with several other schools.
Rehutai School	Rehutai		1947	
Taingaehe School	Taingaehe	1894		
Taipuha School	Taipuha		2004	
Tatarariki School	Tatarariki		1937	
Te Pahi School	Te Pahi			fl 1879
Tikinui School	Tikinui		1937	
Tokatoka School	Tokatoka	1885	1932	
Turiwiri School	Turiwiri		1947	
Whakahara School	Whakahara	early 1870s		
Whenuanui School	Whenuanui		1929	
