= Uretiti Beach =

Clothing-optional beach in New Zealand

Coordinates: 35°57′28″S 174°27′57″E

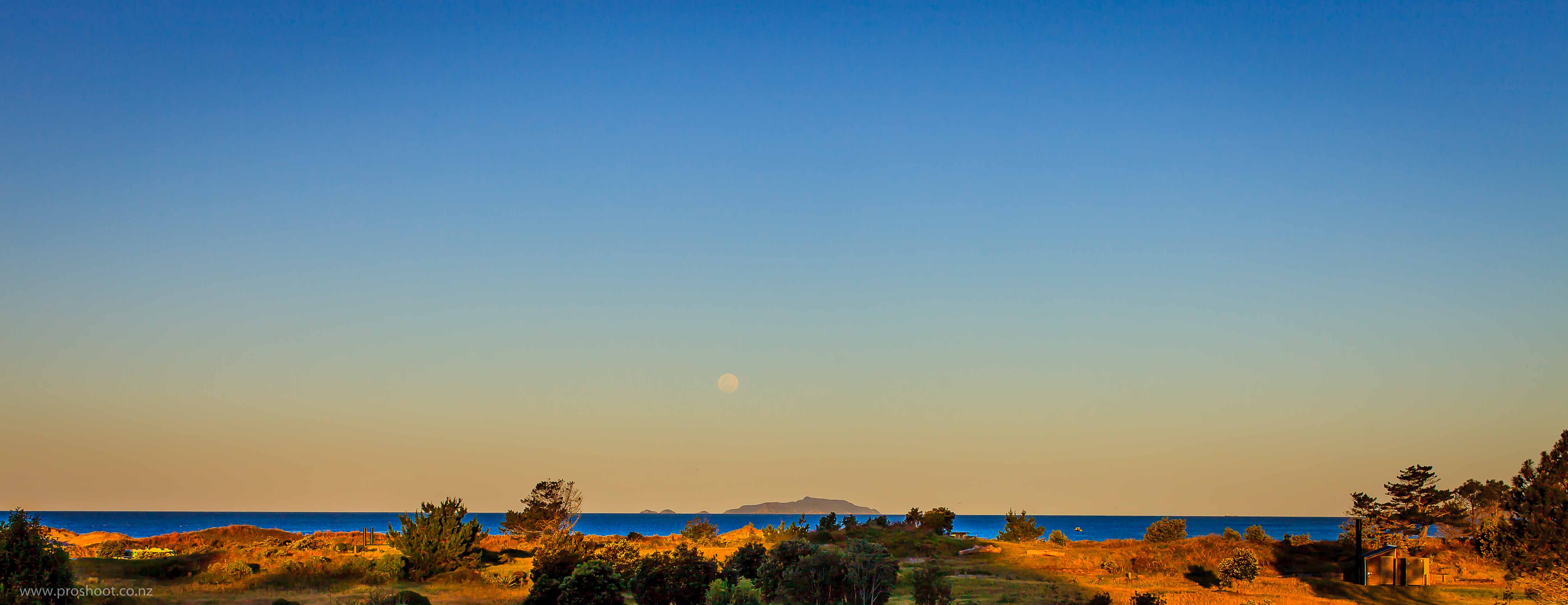
Sea view from Uretiti campground, showing Hen Island

Uretiti Beach ([ˈʉɾɛˌtiti]) is a stretch of beach between Ruakākā and Waipu on Bream Bay to the south of Whangārei in Northland, New Zealand. It comprises the coastal side of the Uretiti Recreation Reserve and Uretiti Scenic Reserve, and is served by a Department of Conservation (DOC) campground within the Recreation Reserve. Uretiti Beach is popular for swimming, surfing, and fishing, a well-known clothing-optional beach, and camping area for the LGBTQ+ community over the New Year period.

== Name ==
The name Uretiti dates to before the British colonization of New Zealand. DOC consulted with the local Patuharakeke hapū before setting the official names of the reserves, but were given no advice on the meaning of Uretiti. In Māori, ure means "penis", and titi means "peg" or "to poke".

It is also local belief that the area was named after the breeding ground of the titi bird, also known as muttonbird or Sooty shearwater. The translation of ure insinuates the meaning of breeding ground, instead of the direct translation.

== Physical geography ==
Uretiti Beach faces almost due east into Bream Bay. Its northern and southern extremities are defined by DOC boundaries rather than topographical features; it shades into Ruakākā Beach adjacent to Ruakākā township at the northern end, and into the Waipu Wildlife Refuge near Waipu town at the southern end. The stretch of beach thus defined is approximately 5 kilometres (3.1 mi) long. Northeast of Ruakākā, Bream Bay ends at Marsden Point, marking the mouth of Whangārei Harbour. Southeast of Waipu town are further beaches including Waipu Cove and Langs Beach before the Bay ends at Bream Tail. The Hen and Chicken Islands lie approximately 25 kilometres (16 mi) offshore to the east.

== Recreational use ==
Uretiti is a popular site for surfing, fishing, swimming, and walking. Its water consistently passes water quality tests for swimming safety. It is not patrolled by lifeguards. The beach is a section of Te Araroa walking trail, which runs the length of the country.

The main access to the beach is via the DOC campground, which provides 300 unpowered tent sites and facilities described as "basic" – toilets, water taps, and cold showers (hot showers are coin-operated). DOC warns visitors to clean their shoes upon leaving to avoid spreading kauri dieback disease, and notes that wasp nests are a hazard in the area. Uretiti is a popular site for New Year's Eve revelry; visitors wishing to camp during the peak of the season are advised to book in advance. New Year revellers and other visitors frequently light fireworks or bonfires on the beach despite total fire bans in the area; fireworks are believed to be responsible for a fire which claimed 500 square metres (5,400 sq ft) of scrub in 2016.

=== Nudity ===
Uretiti is Northland's most popular beach for naturism. In general, naturists use the southern half of the beach; however, this is a custom rather than an enforceable rule. Public nudity is legal on any New Zealand beach where it is "known to occur". Nudity is not permitted within the DOC campground; campers found in breach of this rule are asked to dress or leave the site.

=== LGBTQ+ community ===
Uretiti is an established destination for the LGBTQ+ community over the New Year period, with more than half of the local DOC campsite being populated by gay and lesbian travellers. There are rainbow themed gathering and dance parties at the campsite. It has been said that the establishment of a naturist community has in-turn led to growth of the LGBTQ+ community at Uretiti due to a more accepting environment. In addition to naturism, gay cruising is also active around the campsite and sand dunes.

=== Tensions over crab-fishing ===
Tensions have arisen between visiting crab-fishers and local residents, who allege that the fishers frequently leave animal carcasses, used as crab bait, on the beach. A number of fishers drowned in the late 2010s while setting crab pots in small dinghies. As a large proportion of these fishers are of East Asian origin, calls for crab-fishing to be banned in the area have become racially charged.
