= Waipu Cove =

Waipu Cove Waipū Cove
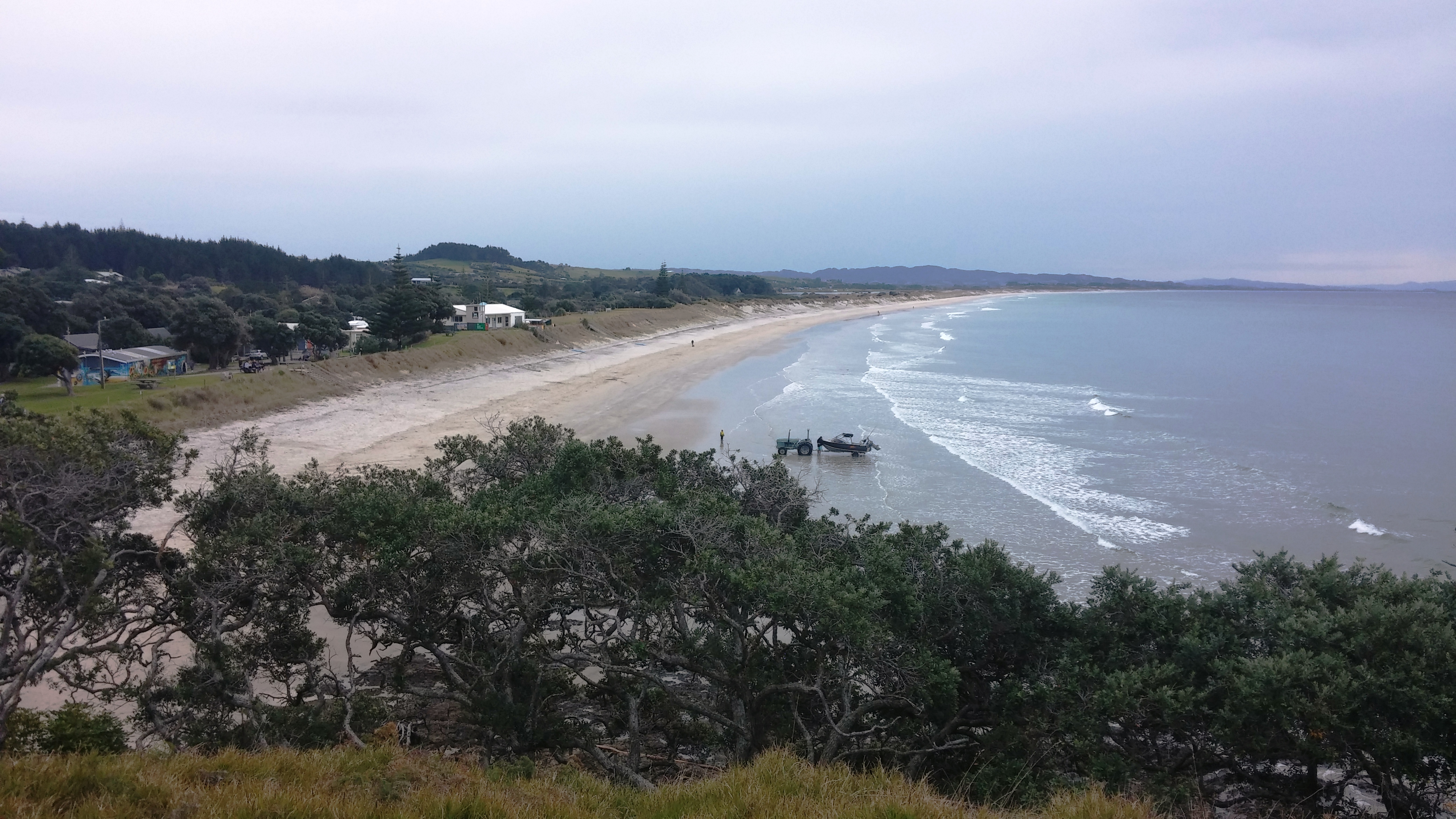
- View over Waipu Cove and Waipu Beach
- Interactive map of Waipu Cove
- Coordinates: 36.029°S 174.505°E
- Country: New Zealand
- Region: Northland Region
- District: Whangarei District
- Ward: Bream Bay Ward
- Electorates: Whangārei; Te Tai Tokerau

Government
  - Territorial Authority: Whangarei District Council
  - Regional council: Northland Regional Council
  - Mayor of Whangārei: Ken Couper
  - Whangārei MP: Shane Reti
  - Te Tai Tokerau MP: Mariameno Kapa-Kingi

Area
  - Total: 3.12 km^{2} (1.20 sq mi)

Population (2023 census)
  - Total: 144
  - Density: 46.2/km^{2} (120/sq mi)

Waipu Cove is a locality and bay of Bream Bay in the Whangarei District and Northland Region of New Zealand. It is about 9 km southeast of Waipu and 5 km northwest of Langs Beach. It has a long sandy beach.

== Demographics ==
Statistics New Zealand describes Waipū Cove-Langs Beach as a rural settlement, which covers 5.25 km^{2} (2.03 sq mi) and had an estimated population of 340 as of June 2025, with a population density of 65 people per km^{2}. Waipū Cove itself covers 3.12 km^{2} (1.20 sq mi). They are part of the larger Waipū Rural statistical area.

Historical population for Waipū Cove
Year	Pop.	±% p.a.
2006	120	—
2013	117	−0.36%
2018	135	+2.90%
2023	144	+1.30%

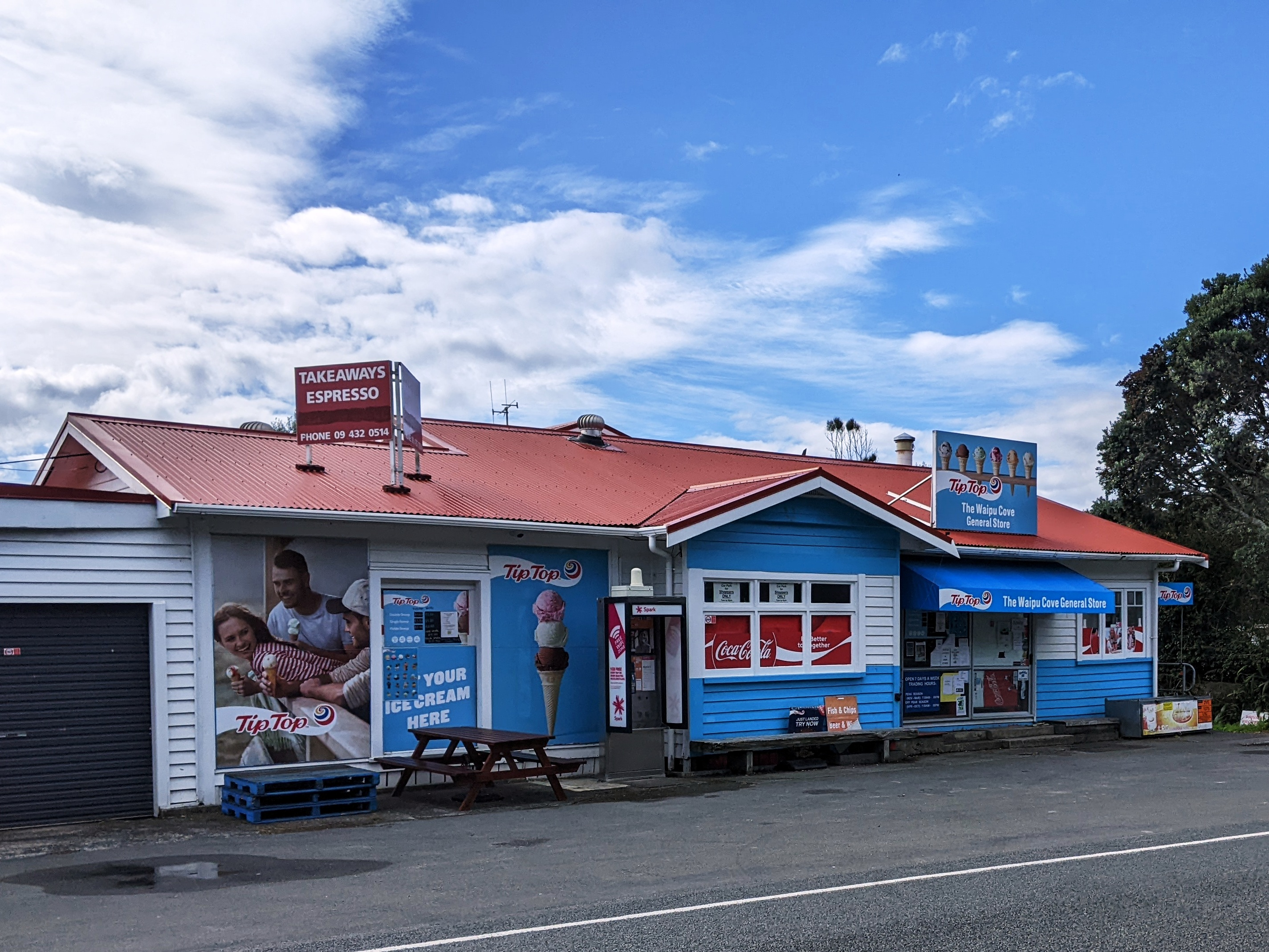
Waipu Cove general store

Waipū Cove had a population of 144 in the 2023 New Zealand census, an increase of 9 people (6.7%) since the 2018 census, and an increase of 27 people (23.1%) since the 2013 census. There were 72 males and 72 females in 69 dwellings. The median age was 60.3 years (compared with 38.1 years nationally). There were 15 people (10.4%) aged under 15 years, 9 (6.2%) aged 15 to 29, 69 (47.9%) aged 30 to 64, and 51 (35.4%) aged 65 or older.

People could identify as more than one ethnicity. The results were 83.3% European (Pākehā); 16.7% Māori; 2.1% Pasifika; 2.1% Asian; 4.2% Middle Eastern, Latin American and African New Zealanders (MELAA); and 4.2% other, which includes people giving their ethnicity as "New Zealander". English was spoken by 95.8%, Māori language by 4.2%, and other languages by 6.2%. No language could be spoken by 2.1% (e.g. too young to talk). The percentage of people born overseas was 20.8, compared with 28.8% nationally.

Religious affiliations were 33.3% Christian, 2.1% New Age, and 2.1% other religions. People who answered that they had no religion were 54.2%, and 6.2% of people did not answer the census question.

Of those at least 15 years old, 15 (11.6%) people had a bachelor's or higher degree, 75 (58.1%) had a post-high school certificate or diploma, and 21 (16.3%) people exclusively held high school qualifications. The median income was $37,800, compared with $41,500 nationally. 12 people (9.3%) earned over $100,000 compared to 12.1% nationally. The employment status of those at least 15 was that 54 (41.9%) people were employed full-time and 21 (16.3%) were part-time.

== Education ==
The first Waipu Cove School was established in 1863 and closed in 1867. Another school opened in a temporary building in 1870, and gained a permanent building in 1877. It closed in 1939.
