= Bream Bay =

Bream Bay Whanga-a-Tamure
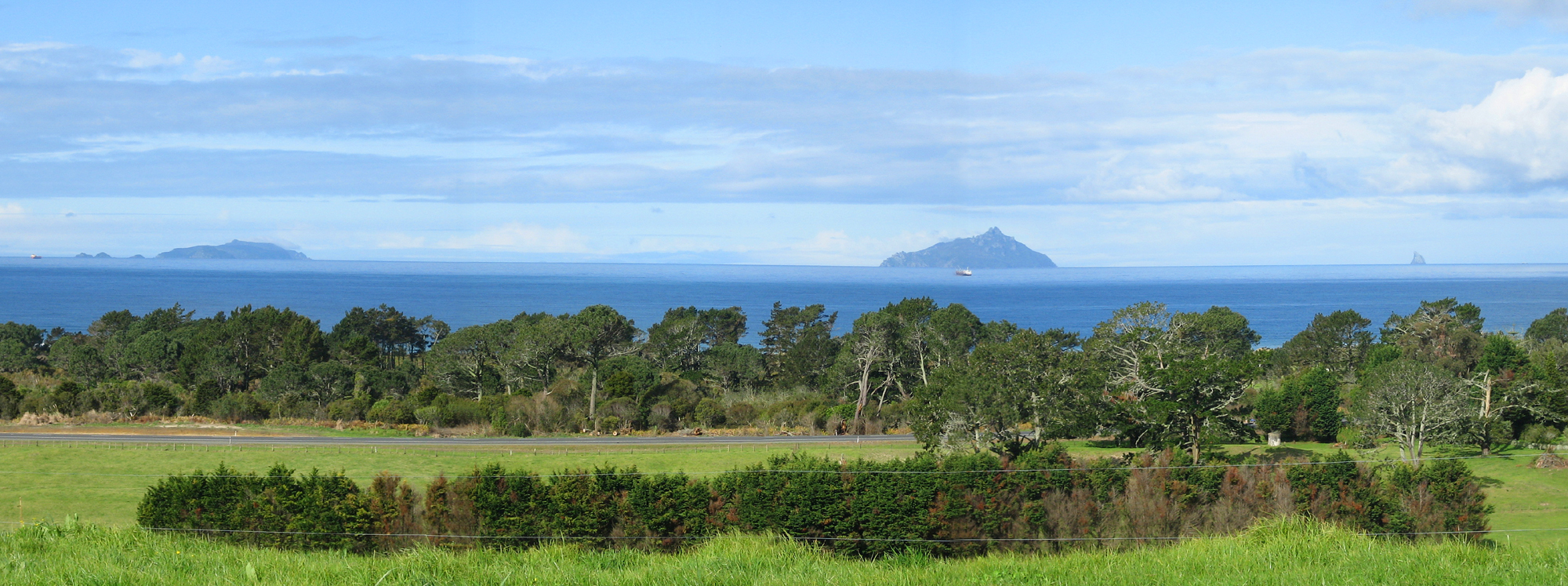
- View from near Ruakākā out to the Hen (right centre) and Chicken Islands (left) and Sail Rock (right)
- Interactive map of Bream Bay
- Coordinates: 35°56′45″S 174°31′4″E
- Country: New Zealand
- Region: Northland
- Territorial authority: Whangarei District
- Ward: Bream Bay Ward
- Pre 1989: Whangarei County
- Electorates: Whangārei; Te Tai Tokerau

Government
  - Territorial Authority: Whangarei District Council
  - Regional council: Northland Regional Council
  - Mayor of Whangārei: Ken Couper
  - Whangārei MP: Shane Reti
  - Te Tai Tokerau MP: Mariameno Kapa-Kingi

Area
  - Total: 237.68 km^{2} (91.77 sq mi)

Population (June 2025)
  - Total: 2,380
  - Density: 10.0/km^{2} (25.9/sq mi)
- Time zone: UTC+12 (NZST)
  - Summer (DST): UTC+13 (NZDT)

Bream Bay is an embayment and area south-east of Whangārei, on the east coast of New Zealand. The bay runs from Bream Head, at the mouth of Whangārei Harbour, 22 kilometres south to the headland of Bream Tail, east of Langs Beach and north of Mangawhai. It was named by Captain James Cook. The Bream Bay area includes the towns of Ruakākā, One Tree Point and Waipu. A group of nature reserve islands lie outside Bream Bay: the Hen and Chicken Islands and Sail Rock.

== Geography ==
=== Naming ===
Bream Bay was named by Captain James Cook after noticing that the bay's waters were populated with a vast number of bream, although it is now thought he was mistaken with snapper. He also named, in the same vein, Bream Head and Bream Tail at the northern and southern ends of the bay.

== Districts ==
=== Ruakākā ===
Ruakākā area is made up of Ruakākā Beach, Ruakākā Township and Marsden Point. Ruakākā has seen development due to its proximity to the expansion of the country's only oil refinery at Marsden Point during the 1980s. A timber processing plant at Marsden Point has further stimulated growth.

=== One Tree Point ===
One Tree Point, once considered part of Ruakākā, has peeled away from the Ruakākā township as it begins to grow. Along with its off-spring area of Takahiwai, they are positioned along Whangārei Harbour. One Tree Point is a fast-growing community catering to the lifestyle blocks of the northern Bream Bay area. One Tree Point is made up of One Tree Point, Marsden Cove, Takahiwai and the eastern blocks of Marsden Point. Access is by the Port Marsden road via Ruakākā or by marine access.

=== Waipu ===
Waipu is the south-most and largest township. It features a variety of attractions ranging from surf beaches, caves, waterfalls to memorable dining. Waipu is fast gaining international immigrants and is seen to be Bream Bay's only chance at a kept rural community, with the socioeconomic growth been delivered by Ruakaka and One Tree Point. Access is gained from State Highway 1 or through back roads from Maungaturoto or Wellsford.

Waipu is situated up the river from the coast, at the last navigable place for larger boats. The Waipu Boat Club is now situated at the place where boats used to unload when the coast and river were the main transport links. However, it has strong coastal links with Waipu Cove 8 km away and Uretiti Beach 5 km away. Settled by Highland Scots immigrants under the charismatic Rev Norman McLeod in the 1850s, it still has a strong Scottish tradition with its own pipe band, and the Waipu Museum telling the story of the migration.

=== Islands ===
The Hen & Chicken Islands and Sail Rock are nature reserve islands just off the coast of Bream Bay. They have no human inhabitants.

== Demographics ==
The statistical area of Bream Bay, which covers 237.68 km^{2} (91.77 sq mi) between Waipu and Whangārei Harbour but excludes the settlements of Waipu, Ruakaka and One Tree Point, had an estimated population of 2,380 as of June 2025, with a population density of 10.0 people per km^{2}.

Historical population
Year	Pop.	±% p.a.
2006	1,494	—
2013	1,647	+1.40%
2018	2,064	+4.62%
2023	2,340	+2.54%
The 2006 population is for a smaller area of 235.32 km^{2} Source:

Bream Bay had a population of 2,340 in the 2023 New Zealand census, an increase of 276 people (13.4%) since the 2018 census, and an increase of 693 people (42.1%) since the 2013 census. There were 1,203 males, 1,128 females and 6 people of other genders in 816 dwellings. 2.4% of people identified as LGBTIQ+. The median age was 46.0 years (compared with 38.1 years nationally). There were 435 people (18.6%) aged under 15 years, 324 (13.8%) aged 15 to 29, 1,119 (47.8%) aged 30 to 64, and 459 (19.6%) aged 65 or older.

People could identify as more than one ethnicity. The results were 84.7% European (Pākehā); 24.7% Māori; 3.5% Pasifika; 4.6% Asian; 0.5% Middle Eastern, Latin American and African New Zealanders (MELAA); and 3.5% other, which includes people giving their ethnicity as "New Zealander". English was spoken by 97.6%, Māori language by 5.1%, Samoan by 0.3%, and other languages by 5.4%. No language could be spoken by 1.7% (e.g. too young to talk). New Zealand Sign Language was known by 0.5%. The percentage of people born overseas was 16.2, compared with 28.8% nationally.

Religious affiliations were 22.7% Christian, 0.8% Hindu, 0.3% Islam, 0.6% Māori religious beliefs, 0.6% Buddhist, 0.6% New Age, 0.5% Jewish, and 1.0% other religions. People who answered that they had no religion were 65.6%, and 7.3% of people did not answer the census question.

Of those at least 15 years old, 261 (13.7%) people had a bachelor's or higher degree, 1,122 (58.9%) had a post-high school certificate or diploma, and 444 (23.3%) people exclusively held high school qualifications. The median income was $37,000, compared with $41,500 nationally. 183 people (9.6%) earned over $100,000 compared to 12.1% nationally. The employment status of those at least 15 was that 912 (47.9%) people were employed full-time, 303 (15.9%) were part-time, and 39 (2.0%) were unemployed.

== Climate ==
The region has warm humid summers and mild winters. Typical summer temperatures range from 22 to 26 °C (72 to 79 °F). Ground frosts are virtually unknown. The hottest months are January and February. Typical annual rainfall for the region is 1500–2000 mm. Winds year-round are predominantly from the southwest.

== Education ==
Schools are Bream Bay College (in Ruakākā), Ruakaka School, One Tree Point School and Waipu Primary School.
