= Langs Beach =

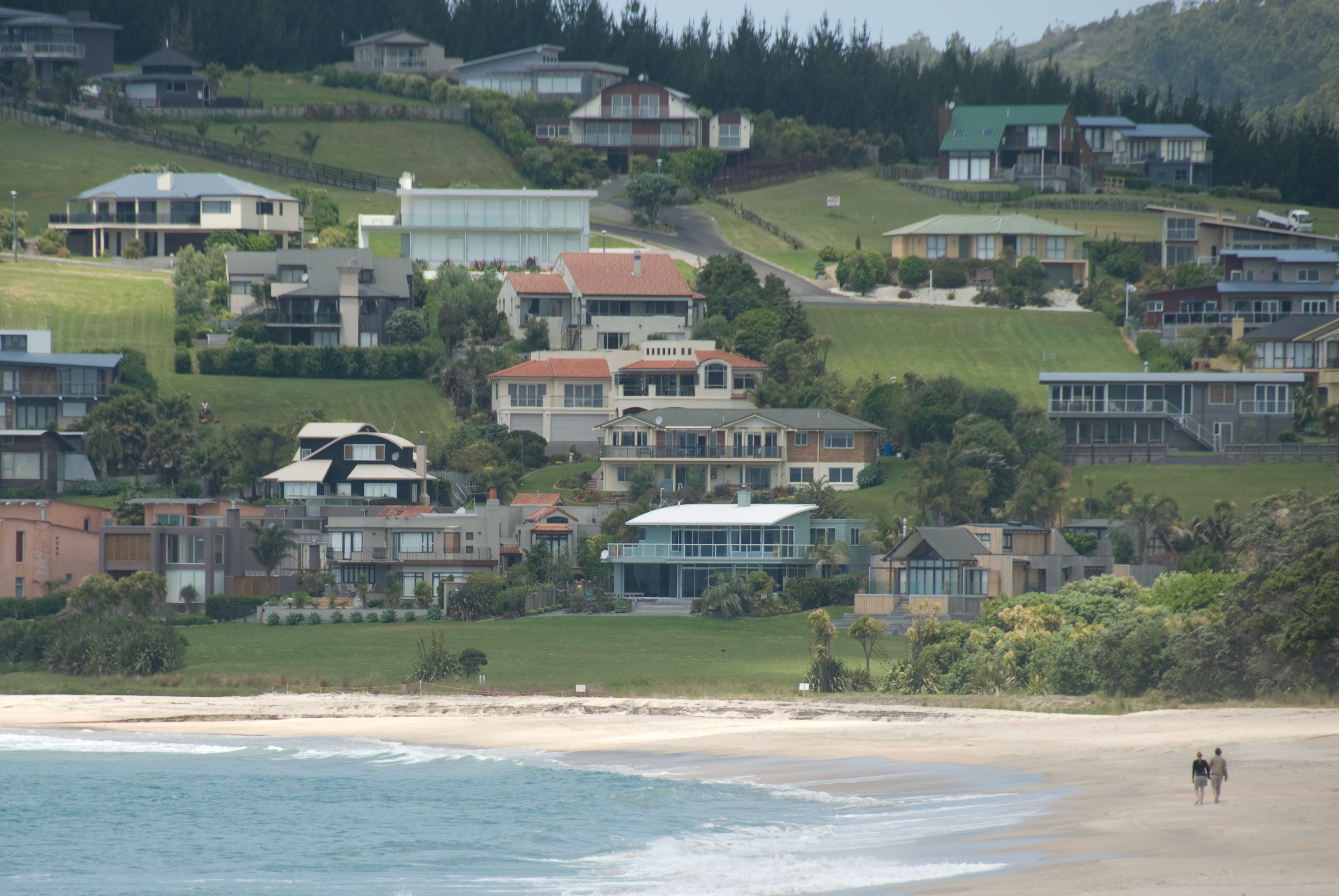
- Langs Beach in 2007
- Interactive map of Langs Beach
- Coordinates: 36.047°S 174.533°E
- Country: New Zealand
- Region: Northland Region
- District: Whangarei District
- Ward: Bream Bay Ward
- Electorates: Whangārei; Te Tai Tokerau

Government
  - Territorial Authority: Whangarei District Council
  - Regional council: Northland Regional Council
  - Mayor of Whangārei: Ken Couper
  - Whangārei MP: Shane Reti
  - Te Tai Tokerau MP: Mariameno Kapa-Kingi

Area
  - Total: 2.13 km^{2} (0.82 sq mi)

Population (2023 census)
  - Total: 168
  - Density: 78.9/km^{2} (204/sq mi)

Langs Beach is a locality on the shore of Bream Bay in the Whangarei District and Northland Region of New Zealand. It is about 5 km southeast of Waipu Cove and 10 km northwest of Mangawhai Heads.

The locality and the adjacent McKenzie Cove are named for the settlers Duncan McKenzie and William Lang who bought blocks about 1856. Lang's family subsequently bought out McKenzie's, and their farm was sold in pieces from 1927 to 1990.

Langs Beach was called Northland's most expensive suburb in 2019.

== Demographics ==
Statistics New Zealand describes Waipū Cove-Langs Beach as a rural settlement, which covers 5.25 km^{2} (2.03 sq mi) and had an estimated population of 340 as of June 2025, with a population density of 65 people per km^{2}. Langs Beach itself covers 2.13 km^{2} (0.82 sq mi). They are part of the larger Waipū Rural statistical area.

Historical population for Langs Beach
Year	Pop.	±% p.a.
2006	102	—
2013	102	+0.00%
2018	132	+5.29%
2023	168	+4.94%

Langs Beach had a population of 168 in the 2023 New Zealand census, an increase of 36 people (27.3%) since the 2018 census, and an increase of 66 people (64.7%) since the 2013 census. There were 90 males and 75 females in 84 dwellings. 5.4% of people identified as LGBTIQ+. The median age was 63.4 years (compared with 38.1 years nationally). There were 15 people (8.9%) aged under 15 years, 12 (7.1%) aged 15 to 29, 63 (37.5%) aged 30 to 64, and 75 (44.6%) aged 65 or older.

People could identify as more than one ethnicity. The results were 92.9% European (Pākehā), 10.7% Māori, 3.6% Pasifika, and 3.6% Asian. English was spoken by 100.0%, Māori language by 1.8%, and other languages by 5.4%. The percentage of people born overseas was 16.1, compared with 28.8% nationally.

Religious affiliations were 39.3% Christian. People who answered that they had no religion were 51.8%, and 7.1% of people did not answer the census question.

Of those at least 15 years old, 51 (33.3%) people had a bachelor's or higher degree, 78 (51.0%) had a post-high school certificate or diploma, and 15 (9.8%) people exclusively held high school qualifications. The median income was $50,900, compared with $41,500 nationally. 36 people (23.5%) earned over $100,000 compared to 12.1% nationally. The employment status of those at least 15 was that 54 (35.3%) people were employed full-time and 24 (15.7%) were part-time.
