= One Tree Point =

One Tree Point may refer to:

- A locality within Padstow Heights, New South Wales, Australia.
- One Tree Point, New Zealand, a small urban area in Northland region.
