= Ruakākā River =

Coordinates: 35°53′58.63″S 174°27′6.55″E

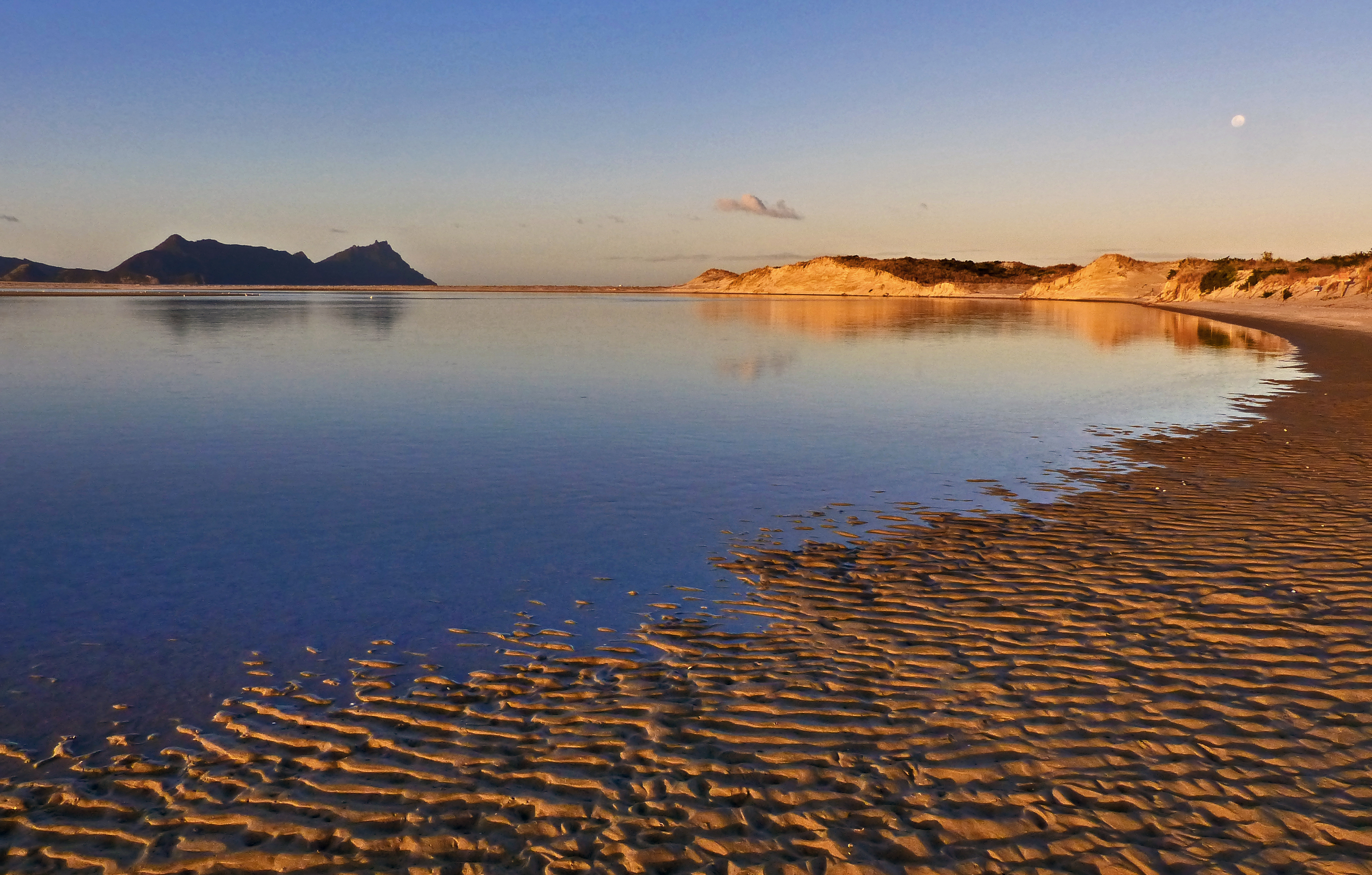
- The estuary near the river mouth, with Bream Head in the distance across Bream Bay

Location
- Country: New Zealand

Physical characteristics
- Mouth
  - location: Bream Bay
- Length: 10 km (6.2 mi)

The Ruakākā River is in the Northland Region of New Zealand's North Island. It flows east to Ruakākā township then turns south, reaching the sea at the Ruakākā Beach settlement on Bream Bay.

== See also ==
- List of rivers of New Zealand
