= Marsden Bay =

Marsden Bay may refer to:

- Marsden Bay, Tyne and Wear, a bay on the coast of north-east England, near Marsden, Tyne and Wear
- Marsden Bay, New Zealand, a bay at the entrance to Whangarei Harbour in New Zealand
