= Waiputrechus =

Conservation status
- Nationally Critical (NZ TCS)

Scientific classification
- Domain: Eukaryota
- Kingdom: Animalia
- Phylum: Arthropoda
- Class: Insecta
- Order: Coleoptera
- Suborder: Adephaga
- Family: Carabidae
- Subfamily: Trechinae
- Genus: Waiputrechus; Townsend, 2010
- Species: W. cavernicola

Binomial name
- Waiputrechus cavernicola Townsend, 2010

Genus of beetles

Waiputrechus is a genus of beetles in the family Carabidae, containing a single species endemic to New Zealand. Waiputrechus cavernicola is known only from a single specimen collected in 1999 by Maree Hunt from a rocky wall inside a cave, Mert's Muddle, near Waipu. It has been classified as "nationally critical" under the New Zealand Threat Classification System.

== Description ==
Waiputrechus cavernicola is very small, the holotype specimen being 3.1 mm in length. It is a pale yellowish brown.
