= Marsden Bay, New Zealand =

Marsden Bay
- Interactive map of Marsden Bay
- Coordinates: 35°49′53″S 174°27′57″E
- Country: New Zealand
- Region: Northland Region
- District: Whangarei District
- Ward: Bream Bay Ward
- Electorates: Whangārei; Te Tai Tokerau

Government
  - Territorial Authority: Whangarei District Council
  - Regional council: Northland Regional Council
  - Mayor of Whangārei: Ken Couper
  - Whangārei MP: Shane Reti
  - Te Tai Tokerau MP: Mariameno Kapa-Kingi

Marsden Bay is a locality and bay at the south head of Whangārei Harbour in Northland, New Zealand. The western side of Marsden Bay is a coastal community called One Tree Point, and the eastern side is the industrial development of Marsden Point. Ruakākā lies about 9 km to the south.

The Māori name for the area is Te Poupouwhenua.

== History ==
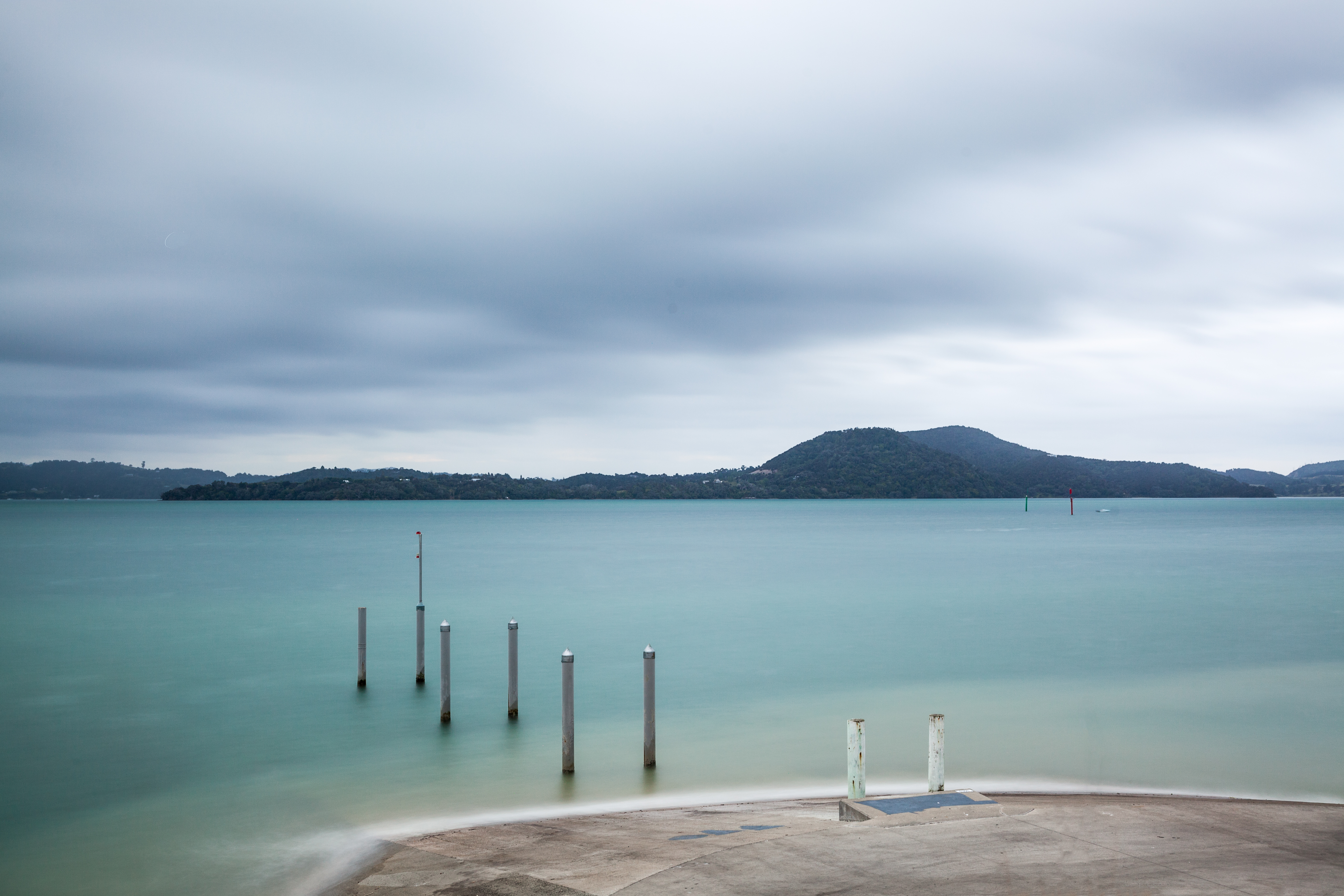
Looking across Whangārei Harbour from One Tree Point

The town of Marsden, situated where Marsden Point is now, was originally intended to be the commercial centre for the district, due to the access to deep water, and because it was closer to Auckland than the area which is now Whangārei. The government purchased 200 acres (81 ha) on the point in the mid-1850s and laid it out in quarter-acre sections. The development of the kauri gum industry changed the focus of settlement to Whangarei.

The Marsden Point oil refinery was built in the 1960s and expanded in the 1980s.

== Demographics ==
Demographics for the former statistical area of Marsden Bay are covered at One Tree Point and Marsden Point.
