= Araara Island =

Island in Northland Region, New Zealand

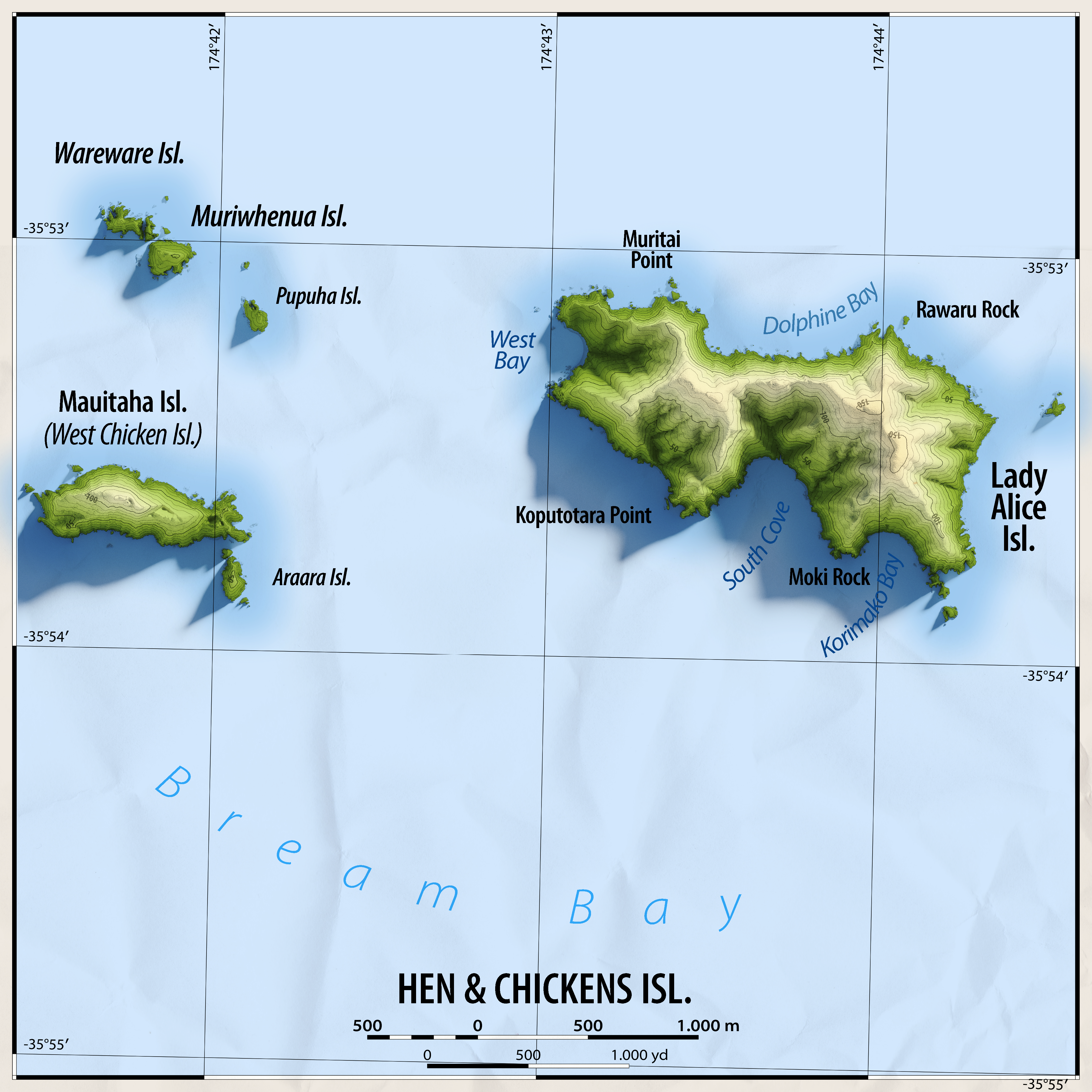
- A map showing Araara Island (left; down from Mauitaha Island)
- Interactive map of Araara Island

Geography
- Location: Northland Region
- Coordinates: 35°53′49.20″S 174°42′03.60″E

Administration
- New Zealand

Demographics
- Population: 0

Araara Island is an island in the Northland Region of New Zealand. It is one of the Hen and Chicken Islands, lying immediately south and east of Mauitaha (West Chicken).

== Birds ==
In a 1984 survey the following species were reported: flesh-footed shearwater, sooty shearwater, fluttering shearwater, diving petrel, grey-faced petrel, little shag, Australasian harrier, black-backed gull, white-fronted tern, red-crowned parakeet, New Zealand pipit, New Zealand bellbird, common starling, and common myna. Penguins and black petrels have been reported at a seabird breeding site on Araara Island. The polynesian rat, which preys on eggs and hatchlings, has been reported on Araara.

== See also ==
- List of islands of New Zealand
- List of islands
- Desert island
