= Bream Bay College =

Location
- 2 Peter Snell Road; Ruakākā, Northland, 0116; New Zealand
- Coordinates: 35.8766°S 174.4556°E

Information
- School type: Public, high school
- Founded: 1940, as Waipu District High School
- Ministry of Education Institution no.: 20
- Years offered: 7–13
- Enrolment: 608 (October 2025)
- Language: English, Māori
- Campus: Ruakākā
- Colours: Black and red
- Feeder schools: One Tree Point School, Ruakākā School, Waipu School
- Website: breambaycollege.school.nz

Bream Bay College is a secondary school in Ruakākā, in the Whangarei District, Northland, New Zealand. The school serves Ruakākā, One Tree Point to the north, the marae-based community of Takahiwai to the west, the town of Waipu to the south, and farming communities inland. The school was founded as Waipu District High School in 1940. It was renamed Bream Bay College in 1972. It opened at its present location on the corner of Marsden Point Road and Peter Snell Road in 1974.

== Notable alumni ==
- Abbie Palmer (born 1997) – squash player
- Scotty Stevenson – Sky Sports presenter and personality
- Eddie Tonks (1934–2020) – businessman and sports administrator
