= Eddie Tonks =

New Zealand rugby union administrator (1934–2020)

Eddie Tonks CBE

Chairman of the New Zealand Rugby Football Union
- In office 1990–1995

Personal details
- Born: Edward James Tonks; 30 December 1934; Wellington, New Zealand
- Died: 19 October 2020 (aged 85); Wellington, New Zealand
- Spouse: Claire Suzanne Poulton (m. 1958)
- Children: 2
- Occupation: Businessman

Edward James Tonks CBE (30 December 1934 – 18 October 2020) was a New Zealand businessman and sports administrator. He served as chair of the New Zealand Rugby Football Union (NZRFU) between 1990 and 1995, and also chaired the International Rugby Board (IRB).

== Personal life ==
Tonks was born in Wellington on 30 December 1934. He was educated at Khandallah Primary School in Wellington, Waipu District High School, and then Wellington Technical College from 1948 to 1950. In 1958, Tonks married Claire Suzanne Poulton, and the couple went on to have two children.

Tonks died at his home in Wellington on 18 October 2020, aged 85.

== Career ==
As a businessman, Tonks had his own exporting company. He was prominent in the Wellington rugby community, and served as deputy chairman of the Wellington Rugby Union between 1977 and 1989. In 1986, Tonks was appointed to the board of the NZRFU, serving as deputy chair from 1988 to 1989, and then chair between 1990 and 1995. He was also chair of the IRB for a time. Tonks was closely involved in the organisation of the 1987 Rugby World Cup, as well as the transition of rugby union from an amateur to professional sport in 1996.

In the 1993 New Year Honours, Tonks was appointed a Commander of the Order of the British Empire, for services to rugby, and in 2004 he was made a life member of New Zealand Rugby.
