= Waipu Scottish Migration Museum =

Museum in Waipu, New Zealand

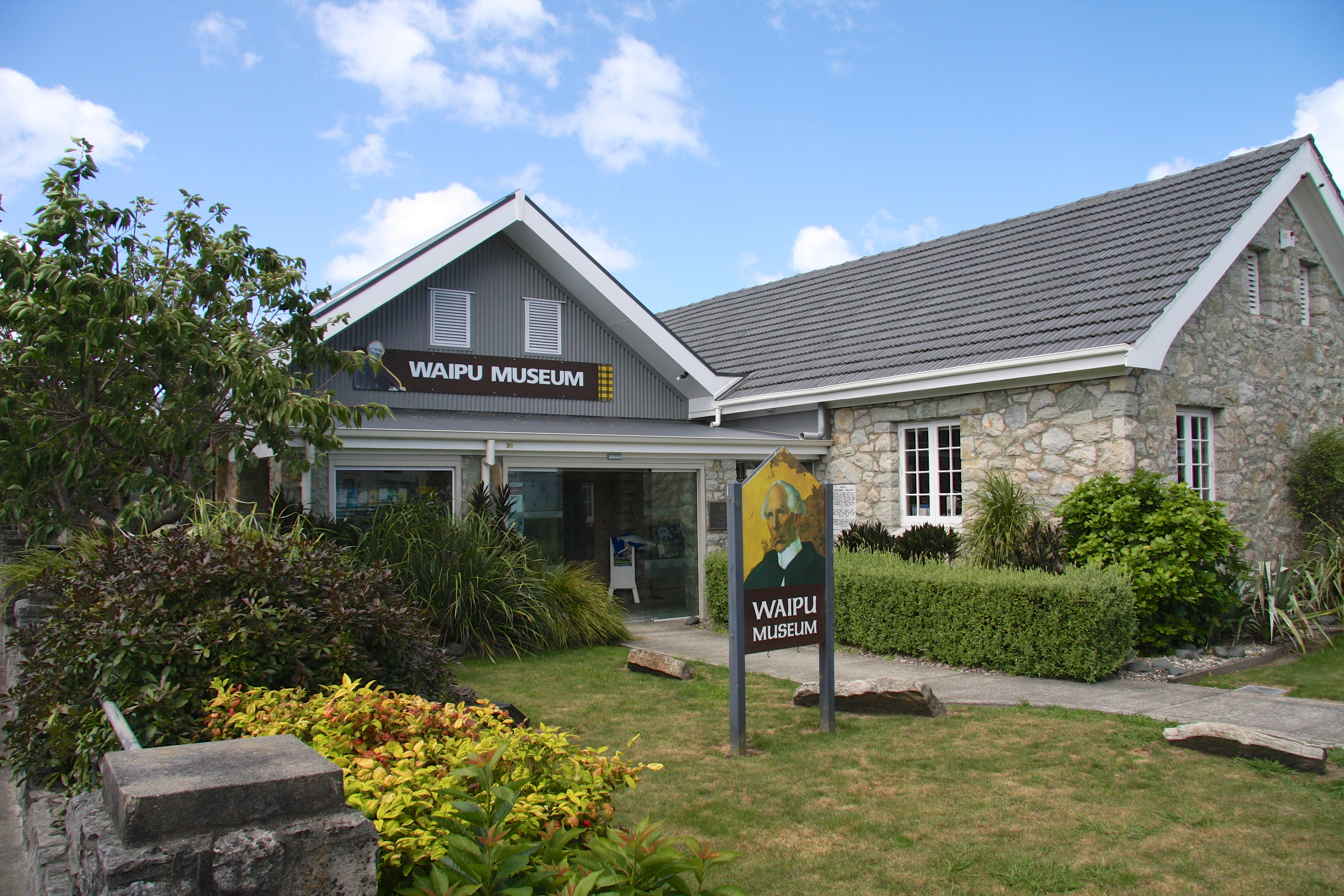
- Established: 1953
- Location: Waipu, Whangarei District, Northland, New Zealand
- Coordinates: 35.984°S 174.4453°E
- Website: www.waipumuseum.com

The Waipu Scottish Migration Museum, also known as the Waipu Museum, is a local museum in the township of Waipu in the Whangarei District, Northland, New Zealand. The museum focuses on the local history of Scottish Nova Scotian migration to the township. In 2016, much of the museum's archival collection was included in the UNESCO New Zealand Memory of the World Register.

== History ==
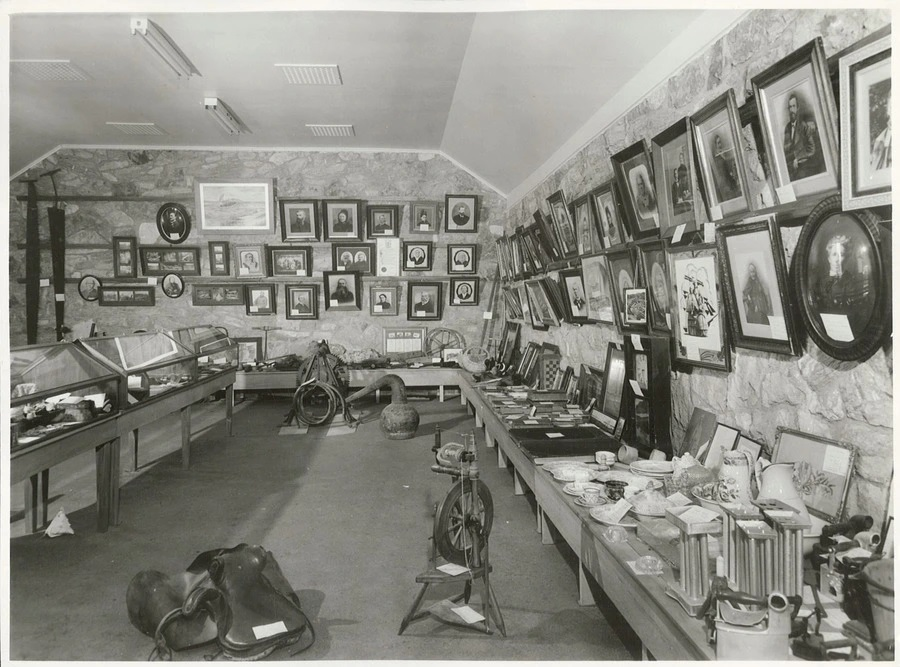
Interior of the museum in April 1953

The Waipu Memorial Museum was opened in January 1953, established to celebrate the centennial of Scottish migration to Waipu. The building was constructed by descendants of the original settlers, and built in stone to resemble a Scottish highland crofter's dwelling, and was named the House of Memories by the descendants. Early collections included family heirlooms and family trees of the Waipu settlers, and while the facility operated long term, it was often closed.

In 1981, resident Betty Powell took over the museum operations, developing the oral history and genealogy resources of the museum.

In 2003 to celebrate the 150th anniversary, a modern extension to the museum was added. Part of the 150th anniversary celebrations included staging an updated version of a 1953 pageant based on the settlers history. The additional research into the story highlighted the need for the museum to more actively research Waipu's Scottish migration stories. The Waipu Museum sponsored a production of James McNeish's play The Rocking Cave (1973), performed in June 2007 at Waipu.

During the 2010s, the Waipu Scottish Migration Museum was criticsed for not including Māori perspectives on the history of Waipu. In response, the museum's 2021 Strategic Plan included planned goals for the museum such as increasing the awareness of the Treaty of Waitangi, collaborating with local hapū Patuharakeke on content, and developing research and acquiring objects of significance related to Patuharakeke and early Scottish migrants.

The archival documents of Scottish migration held at Waipu Museum were included in the UNESCO Memory of the World Aotearoa New Zealand Ngā Mahara o te Ao register in 2016. In 2019, a 200 year old antique doll which was part of the UNESCO collection was stolen from the Waipu Museum, returned two days later in a damaged condition.

== Displays and exhibits ==
The museum tells the history of the area's Scottish migration history during the colonial era of New Zealand.
