= Ruakākā =

- Interactive map of Ruakākā
- Coordinates: 35°54′30.1″S 174°27′34.47″E
- Country: New Zealand
- Region: Northland
- Territorial authority district: Whangarei District
- Ward: Bream Bay Ward
- Pre-1989: Whangarei County

Government
  - Territorial authority: Whangarei District Council
  - Regional council: Northland Regional Council
  - Mayor of Whangārei: Ken Couper
  - Whangārei MP: Shane Reti
  - Te Tai Tokerau MP: Mariameno Kapa-Kingi

Area
  - Total: 15.59 km^{2} (6.02 sq mi)

Population (June 2025)
  - Total: 2,890
  - Density: 185/km^{2} (480/sq mi)
- Time zone: UTC+12 (NZST)
  - Summer (DST): UTC+13 (NZDT)
- Website: ruakaka.co.nz

Ruakākā is a small town on Bream Bay, in Whangarei District in the north of New Zealand, around 30 kilometres south of central Whangārei. Originally a small beachside community, Ruakākā saw development in the 1980s due to expansion of nearby Marsden Point, New Zealand's sole oil refinery. A recently established timber processing plant at Marsden Point has further stimulated growth.

== History ==
The name Ruakākā comes from the Māori term rua kākā, which means the nesting hole of the kākā (Nestor meridionalis), a native parrot that nests in cavities in hollow trees. The name of the locality was usually spelled "Ruakaka", without macrons, until the official name was changed in 2019.

Bream Bay was named by Captain Cook during his first voyage to New Zealand when he visited the region on 25 November 1769. It was named due to the ease of capture of 90–100 fish (likely snapper), which he identified as bream, soon after anchoring.

The area was a location for the late 19th/early 20th century kauri gum digging trade.

== Geography ==
The general area is made up of Ruakākā Beach, Ruakākā Township and Marsden Point. Other Bream Bay localities such as One Tree Point, Takahiwai and even Waipu are often included in general conversation regarding the area.

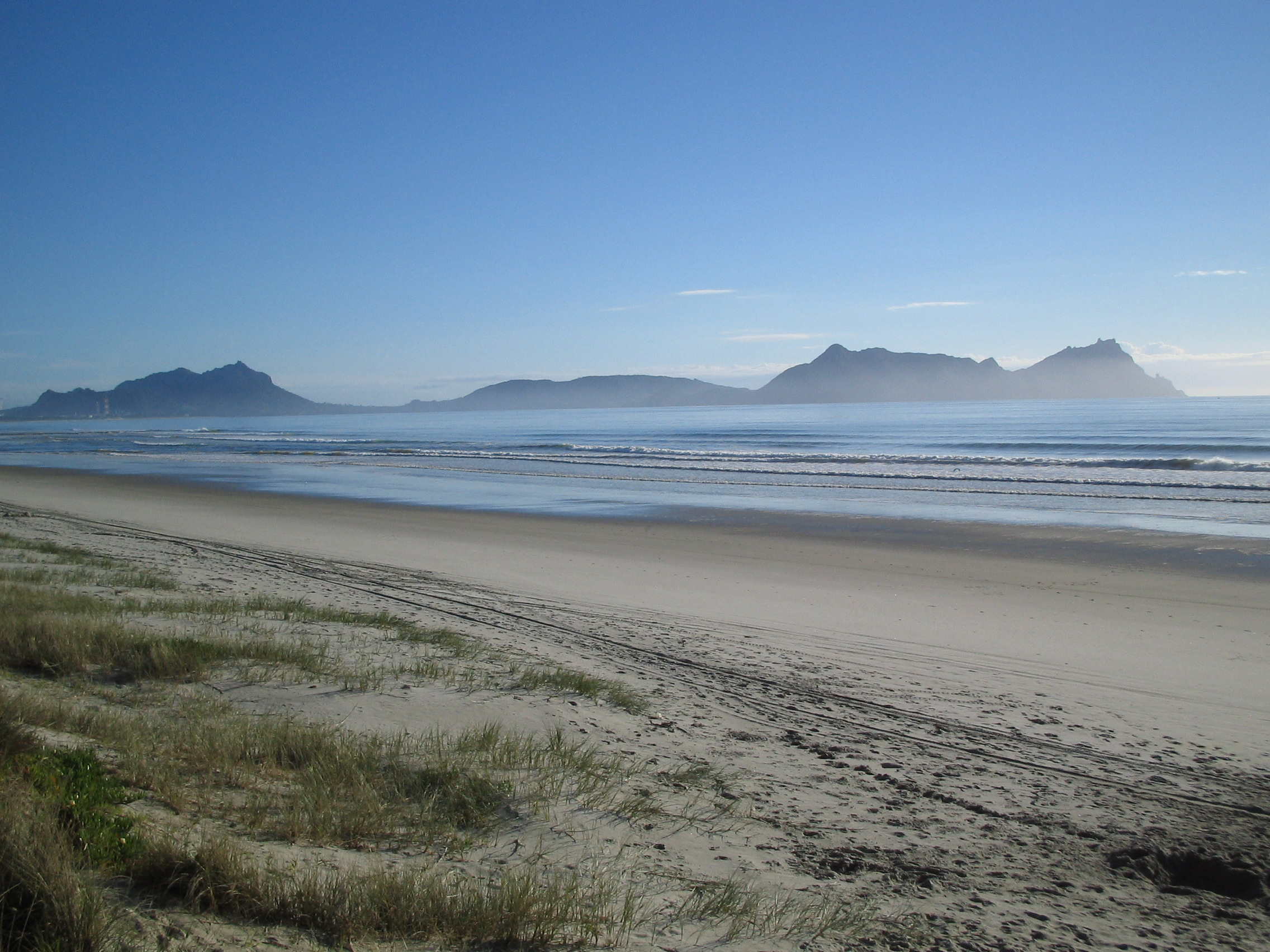
Ruakākā Beach, looking north, 2005

Ruakākā Beach is primarily a residential area made up of a mixture of permanent homes and beach shacks. It lies near the mouth of the Ruakākā River, which boasts a rare bird reserve and popular holiday parks.

Ruakākā Township was developed off the back of the Marsden Point Oil Refinery expansion in the 1980s where services were required to support the large influx of workers from all over the world involved in the project. A government requirement for a percentage of revenue invested in the project to be spent on the local community allowed for provision of services not common in communities this size (e.g. squash courts, sports grounds).

The Marsden Power Station Village was built to support the Marsden Power Stations (A & B), which have since been decommissioned. The area is now promoted as beachside living.

The bay has beautiful sandy white beaches looking out towards Bream Head, the Hen and Chicken Islands, Mount Manaia and Sail Rock.

== Demographics ==
Statistics New Zealand describes Ruakākā as a small urban area. It covers 15.59 km^{2} (6.02 sq mi) and had an estimated population of 2,890 as of June 2025, with a population density of 185 people per km^{2}.

Historical population
Year	Pop.	±% p.a.
2006	1,917	—
2013	2,007	+0.66%
2018	2,586	+5.20%
2023	2,817	+1.73%

Ruakākā had a population of 2,817 in the 2023 New Zealand census, an increase of 231 people (8.9%) since the 2018 census, and an increase of 810 people (40.4%) since the 2013 census. There were 1,389 males, 1,419 females and 6 people of other genders in 1,113 dwellings. 2.4% of people identified as LGBTIQ+. The median age was 46.3 years (compared with 38.1 years nationally). There were 501 people (17.8%) aged under 15 years, 390 (13.8%) aged 15 to 29, 1,179 (41.9%) aged 30 to 64, and 747 (26.5%) aged 65 or older.

People could identify as more than one ethnicity. The results were 79.0% European (Pākehā); 31.1% Māori; 5.5% Pasifika; 4.4% Asian; 0.6% Middle Eastern, Latin American and African New Zealanders (MELAA); and 2.1% other, which includes people giving their ethnicity as "New Zealander". English was spoken by 98.1%, Māori language by 6.7%, Samoan by 0.4%, and other languages by 5.2%. No language could be spoken by 1.6% (e.g. too young to talk). New Zealand Sign Language was known by 0.4%. The percentage of people born overseas was 16.0, compared with 28.8% nationally.

Religious affiliations were 29.4% Christian, 0.5% Hindu, 0.2% Islam, 2.4% Māori religious beliefs, 0.9% Buddhist, 0.3% New Age, 0.1% Jewish, and 1.4% other religions. People who answered that they had no religion were 57.0%, and 7.9% of people did not answer the census question.

Of those at least 15 years old, 258 (11.1%) people had a bachelor's or higher degree, 1,284 (55.4%) had a post-high school certificate or diploma, and 687 (29.7%) people exclusively held high school qualifications. The median income was $33,400, compared with $41,500 nationally. 177 people (7.6%) earned over $100,000 compared to 12.1% nationally. The employment status of those at least 15 was that 969 (41.8%) people were employed full-time, 309 (13.3%) were part-time, and 69 (3.0%) were unemployed.

== Climate ==
The region's geographical location results in warm humid summers and mild winters. Typical summer temperatures range from 22 to 26 °C (72 to 79 °F), some of the warmest in the country. Ground frosts are virtually unknown. The hottest months are January and February. Typical annual rainfall for the region is 1500 – 2000 mm. Winds year-round are predominantly from the southwest. Ruakākā has a warm version of the oceanic climate closely bordering on humid subtropical, a typical feature of Northland's climate.

Climate data for Ruakākā
Month	Jan	Feb	Mar	Apr	May	Jun	Jul	Aug	Sep	Oct	Nov	Dec	Year
Mean daily maximum °C (°F)	24.9 (76.8)	24.8 (76.6)	23.7 (74.7)	21.1 (70.0)	18.9 (66.0)	16.6 (61.9)	15.6 (60.1)	16.2 (61.2)	17.6 (63.7)	19.5 (67.1)	21.0 (69.8)	23.4 (74.1)	20.3 (68.5)
Daily mean °C (°F)	20.1 (68.2)	20.4 (68.7)	19.2 (66.6)	17.2 (63.0)	14.9 (58.8)	12.4 (54.3)	11.8 (53.2)	12.3 (54.1)	13.6 (56.5)	15.2 (59.4)	16.5 (61.7)	18.7 (65.7)	16.0 (60.8)
Mean daily minimum °C (°F)	15.3 (59.5)	15.9 (60.6)	14.7 (58.5)	13.3 (55.9)	10.8 (51.4)	8.2 (46.8)	7.9 (46.2)	8.4 (47.1)	9.5 (49.1)	10.9 (51.6)	11.9 (53.4)	14.0 (57.2)	11.7 (53.1)

== Amenities and infrastructure ==
Ruakaka Race Course hosts horse races of the Whangarei Racing Club.

A branch line railway to Marsden Point from Oakleigh on the North Auckland Line has been proposed. This Marsden Point Branch will primarily serve freight interests, but the Northland Regional Land Transport Committee has suggested that passenger trains for commuters between Ruakākā and Whangārei are a long-term option.

== Education ==
Bream Bay College is a coeducational secondary (years 7–13) school with a roll of 618 students, as of July 2026. It started in 1972 as a Forms 3–7 (years 9–13) school on the site of Waipu District High School. It moved to Ruakākā in February 1974 and expanded to include Forms 1 and 2 (years 7–8).

Ruakākā School is a coeducational contributing primary (years 1–6) school. It has a roll of 297, as of July 2026. It opened in 1898 in North Ruakākā. Until 1916 it was a half-time school sharing a teacher with Mata School. The school moved to its present site just outside the settlement beside State Highway 1 in 1912.
