= Hen and Chicken Islands =

Archipelago off the coast of New Zealand

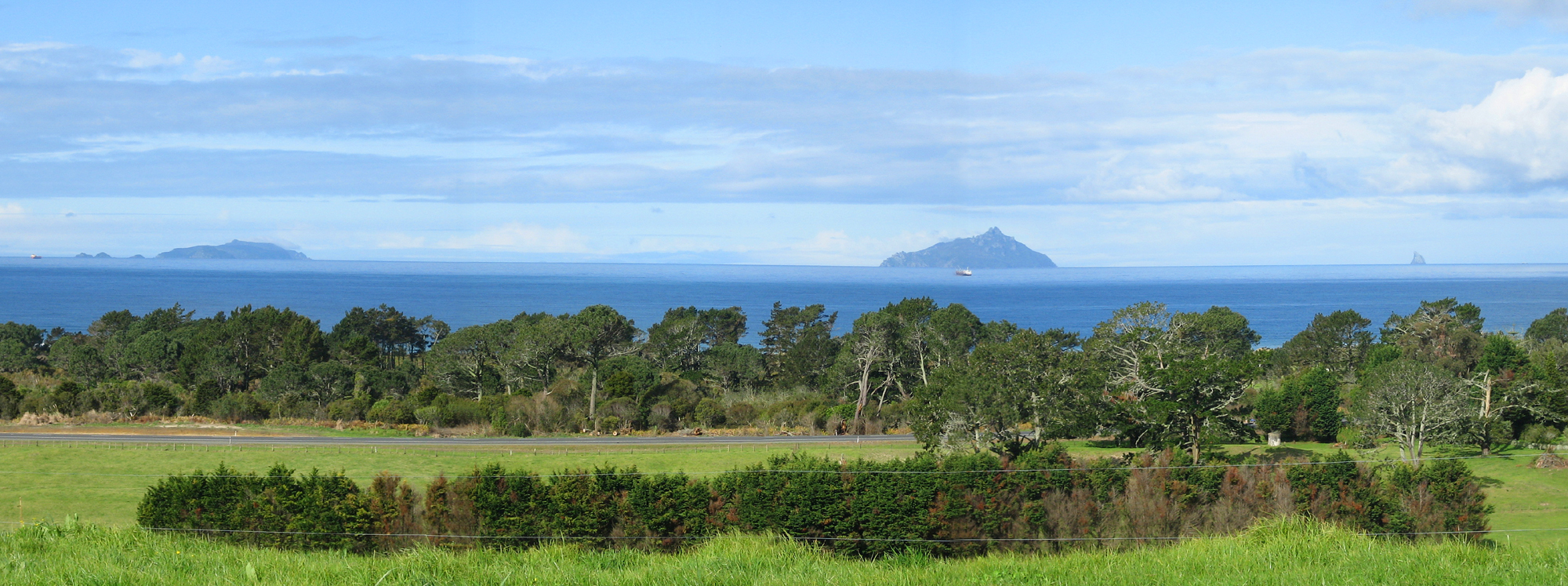
- In the distance, from left to right: the Chickens, Hen Island, Sail Rock
- Hen and Chicken Islands with the surface volcanic andesite in red shading of the Hen. The approximate Taurikura volcanic complex relevant to their formation is in white shading. Legend: Key for the volcanics that are shown with panning is: basalt (shades of brown/orange); monogenetic basalts; undifferentiated basalts of the Tangihua Complex in Northland Allochthon; arc basalts; arc ring basalts; dacite; andesite (shades of red); basaltic andesite; rhyolite (ignimbrite is lighter shades of violet); plutonic; White shading is selected caldera features.; Clicking on the rectangle icon enables full window and mouse-over with volcano name/wikilink and ages before present.

Geography
- Coordinates: 35°56′S 174°44′E
- Total islands: 9
- Area: 8.44 km^{2} (3.26 sq mi)
- Highest elevation: 417 m (1368 ft)

Administration
- New Zealand

Demographics
- Population: 0

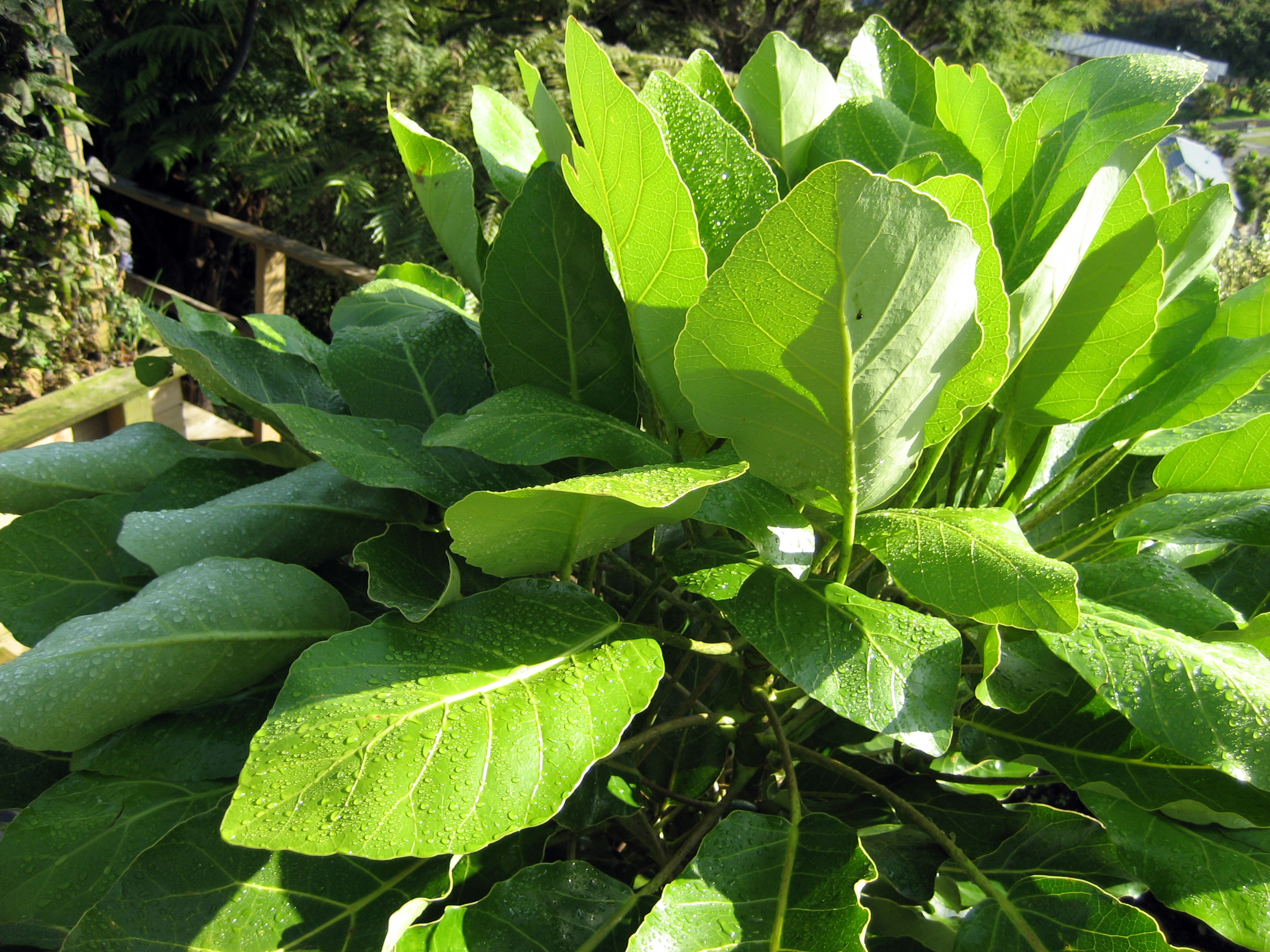
The puka tree is a distinctive part of the flora of the islands

The Hen and Chicken Islands, usually known as the Hen and Chickens, lie to the east of the Northland Peninsula off the coast of northern New Zealand. They lie 12 kilometres (7.5 mi) east of Bream Head and 40 kilometres (25 mi) south-east of Whangārei with a total area of 8.44 km^{2} (3.26 sq mi).

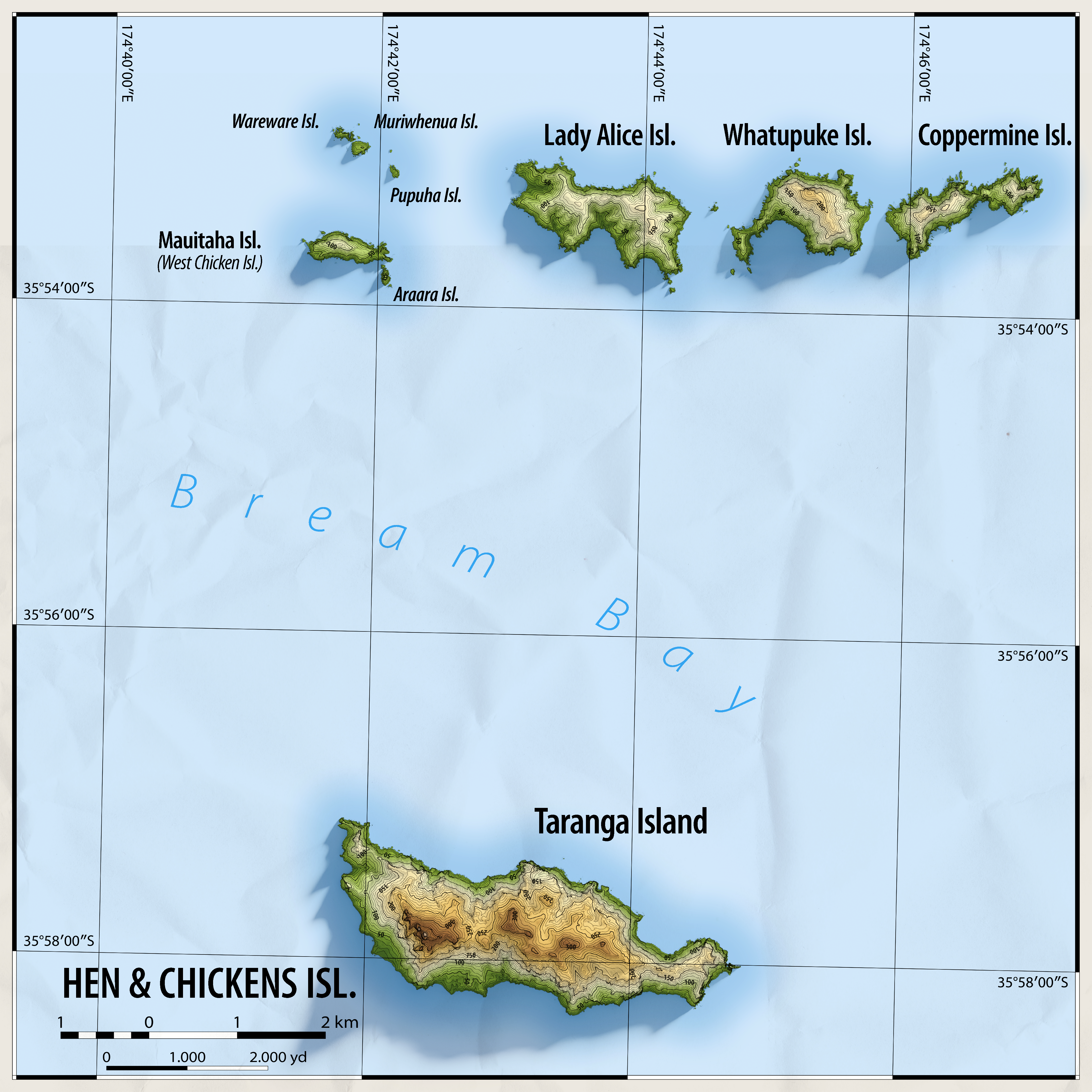
Map of the Hen islands

== History ==
Approximately 18,000 years ago during the Last Glacial Maximum when sea levels were over 100 metres (330 feet) lower than present day levels, the islands were hilly features surrounded by a vast coastal plain. Sea levels began to rise 7,000 years ago, after which the islands separated from the rest of New Zealand.

These islands were given their European name by Captain James Cook, who first sighted them on 25 November 1769. It has been suggested that the name was inspired by an old name for the star cluster usually known as the Pleiades.

Originally owned by the Māori Ngā Puhi iwi, they were sold to the New Zealand Government in 1883. The islands were made a scenic reserve in 1908 owing to the rarity of their flora and fauna, and became a wildlife refuge in 1953. Hen Island had actually passed from Māori hands a few years earlier, being bought by Thomas Outhwaite in 1872. It was bequeathed to the nation by his daughter Isa Outhwaite in 1927, and it too was named as a scenic reserve.

In June 1940, the Canadian-Australasian ship RMS Niagara sank off the islands after hitting a mine. Most of the cargo, which included gold bullion, was later salvaged.

== Environment ==
The islands are noted for their bird life with colonies of seabirds as well as forest birds which have become scarce or extinct on the mainland. The islands have been identified as an Important Bird Area, by BirdLife International because they are home to a breeding population of about 500 pairs of Pycroft's petrels. There are also native reptiles on the islands, including tuatara, geckos and skinks.

== The islands ==
Hen Island, or Māori: Taranga, lies 7 kilometres (4.3 mi) to the southwest from the rest of the archipelago. It is also considerably larger than the Chicken Islands, or Marotiri, which comprise a chain of six small islands running north-west to south-east to the north of Hen Island. The chain consists of Wareware and Muriwhenua Islands (together called North West Chicken), Mauitaha (West Chicken), Lady Alice Island or Motu Muka (Big Chicken), Whatupuke (Middle Chicken), and Coppermine Island (Eastern Chicken).

=== Taranga (Hen) Island ===
Taranga is the largest island by some considerable margin, totalling 4.7 km^{2} (2 sq mi). Long and thin, it has a length of 6 kilometres (3.7 mi) and an average width of less than 1,000 metres (1,094 yd). A remnant of a four-million-year-old volcano, the island is dominated by a rocky ridge reaching to about 417 metres (1,368 ft) at its highest point, called The Pinnacles. Sail Rock, a stack, rises from the ocean 3 kilometres (1.9 mi) to the south of Hen Island, and is a prominent navigational point for yachts.

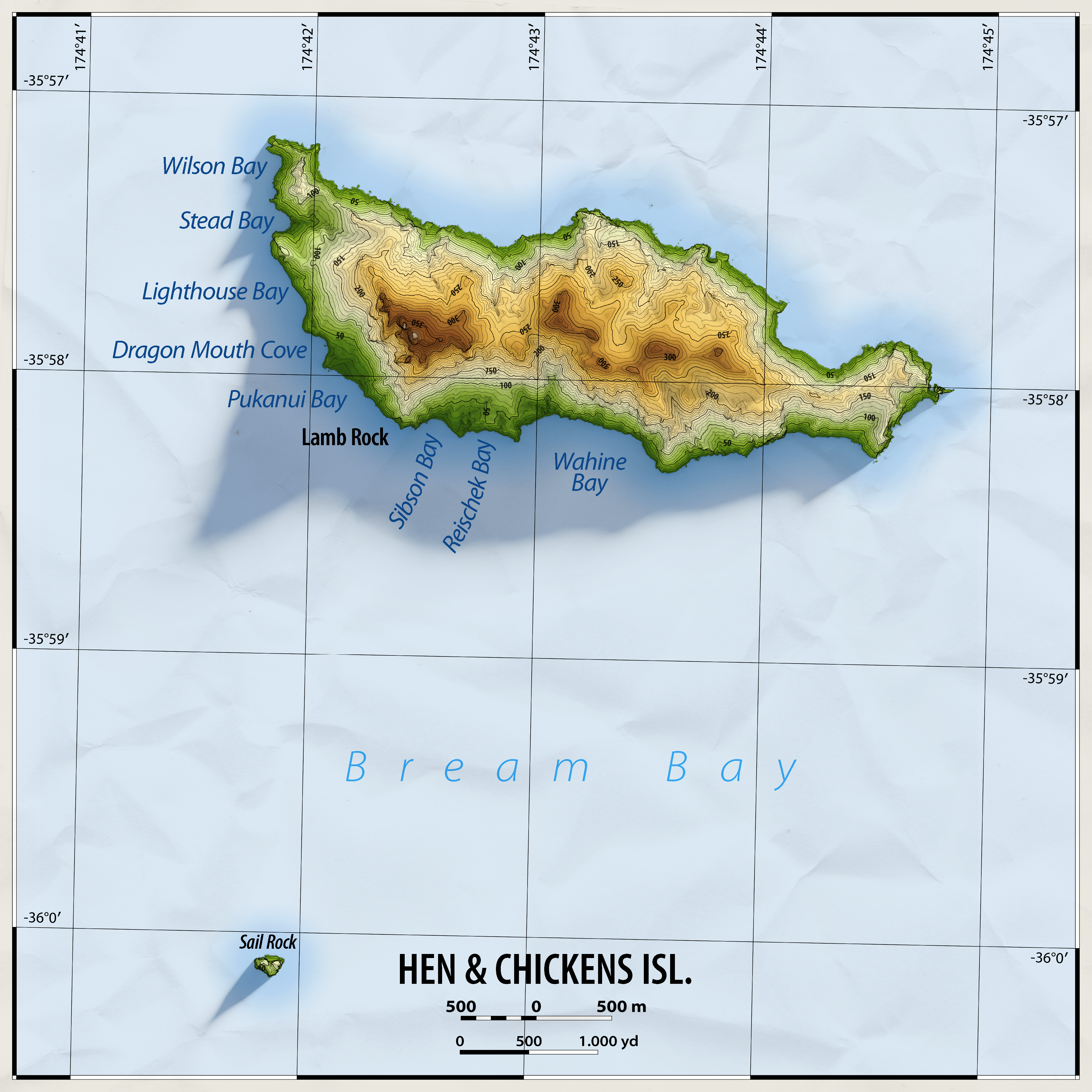
Map of Taranga

By the late 1800s, Hen Island was the only place in New Zealand with a surviving population of North Island saddleback. The once common species of forest bird found in the North Island, was nearly wiped out by the human introduction of mammalian predators, such as rats and stoats. In the 1960s translocations of saddleback from Hen Island to other island sanctuaries around New Zealand began.

=== Wareware and Muriwhenua ===
Two small rocky islands with a combined area of 3 ha (7.4 acres).

=== Mauitaha ===
This 20 ha (49 acres), rugged, scrub-covered rock lies 1 kilometre (0.62 mi) to the south of Muriwhenua. It rises to 125 metres (410 ft). An unofficial name until 1970 was West Chicken Island.

The New Zealand Department of Conservation and the Ngati Wai iwi have entered into partnership to set up a sanctuary for the Polynesian rat, or kiore, on the islands Mauitaha and Araara. A spokesman for Ngati Wai said the kiore heritage will be protected as the movement of the kiore through the Pacific paralleled the migration of the New Zealand Maori. A spokesman for the Department of Conservation said the department's policy change from eradication would assist scientific research.

=== Lady Alice Island ===
Named after Lady Alice Fergusson (wife of Governor General Sir Charles Fergusson), it is the largest of the five Chickens and is of particular significance because of its flora and fauna. The island covers 1.4 km^{2} (0.54 sq mi) and is surrounded by rocky reefs. It was occupied by Māori until the 1820s, and was used as a base for fishermen in the 1890s. Cattle were introduced at about this time, but were removed in the 1920s.

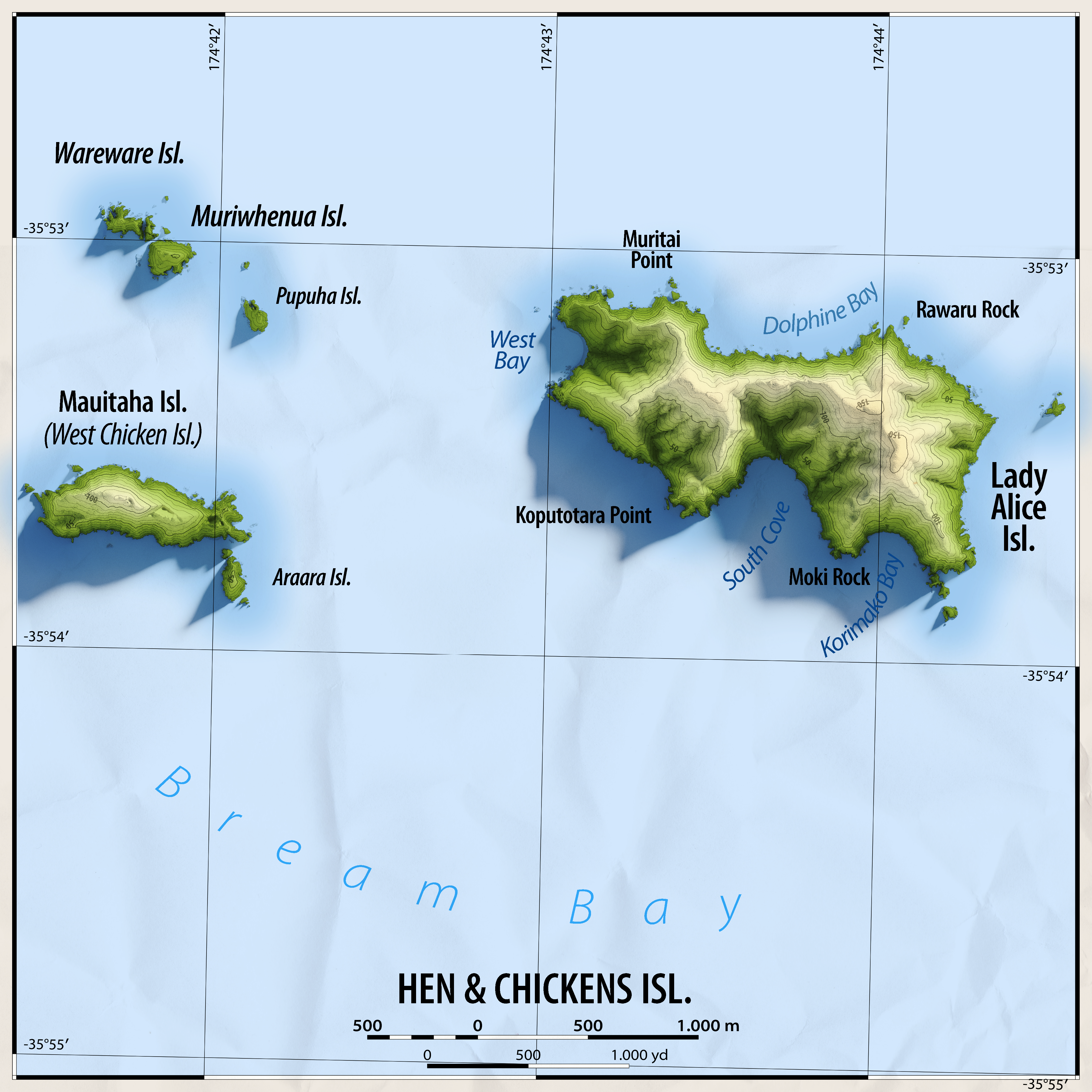
Map of the western Hen islands, including Lady Alice island

=== Whatupuke ===
Formerly known as Whakahau, this island is composed of a large eastern section and a peninsula to the southwest. The coast of the peninsula forms one of the chain's main land features, a 300-metre (328 yd) wide bay (Starfish Bay). The island covers 1 km^{2} (0.39 sq mi), and is steep, rising to 234 metres (768 ft).

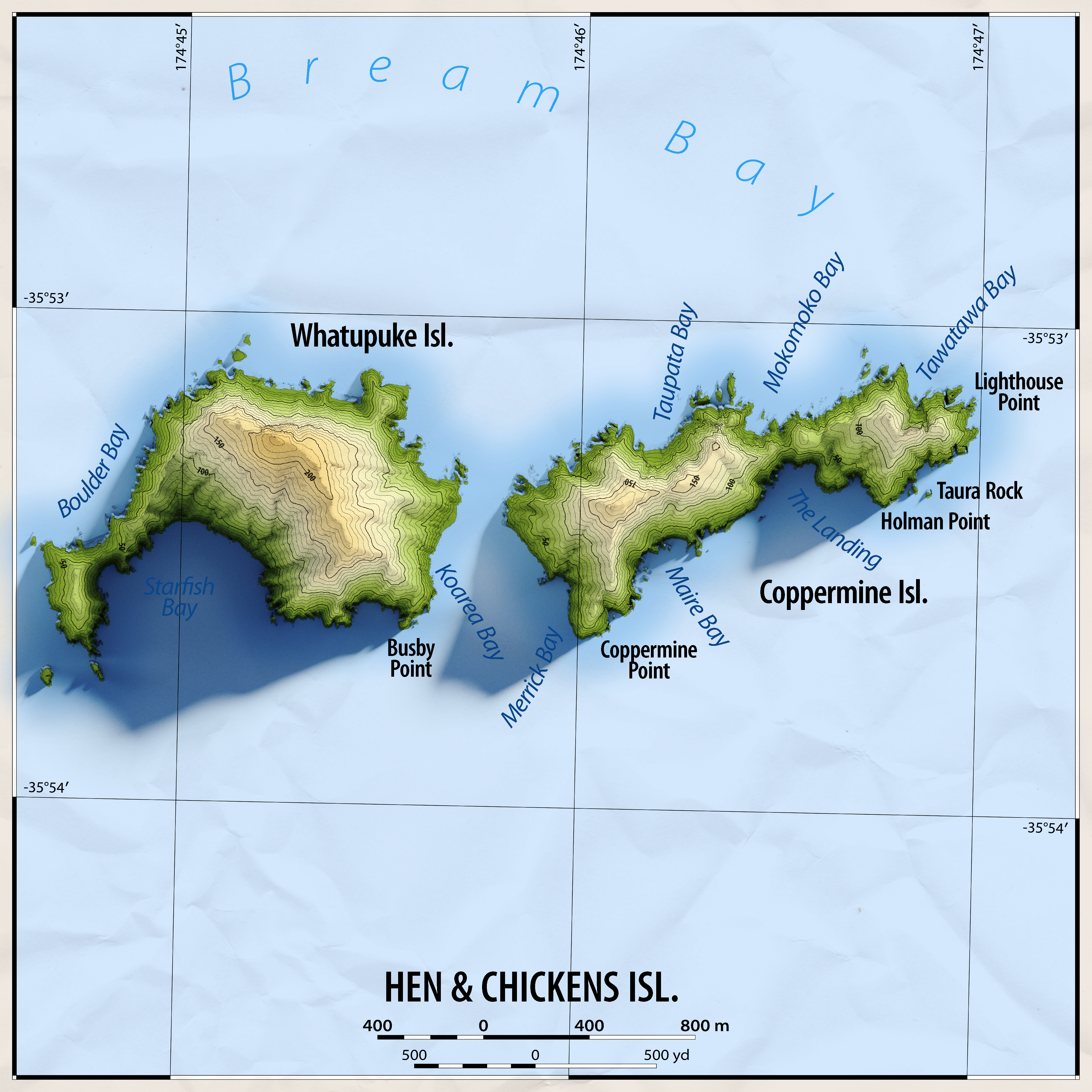
Map of the north-eastern Hen Islands

=== Coppermine Island ===
Coppermine island formerly known as Mauipane covers an area of 75 ha (190 acres). It is composed of two sections joined by a short isthmus. As the name suggests, there are copper deposits on the island, but attempts at mining them in 1849 and 1898 proved unprofitable.

== Gallery ==
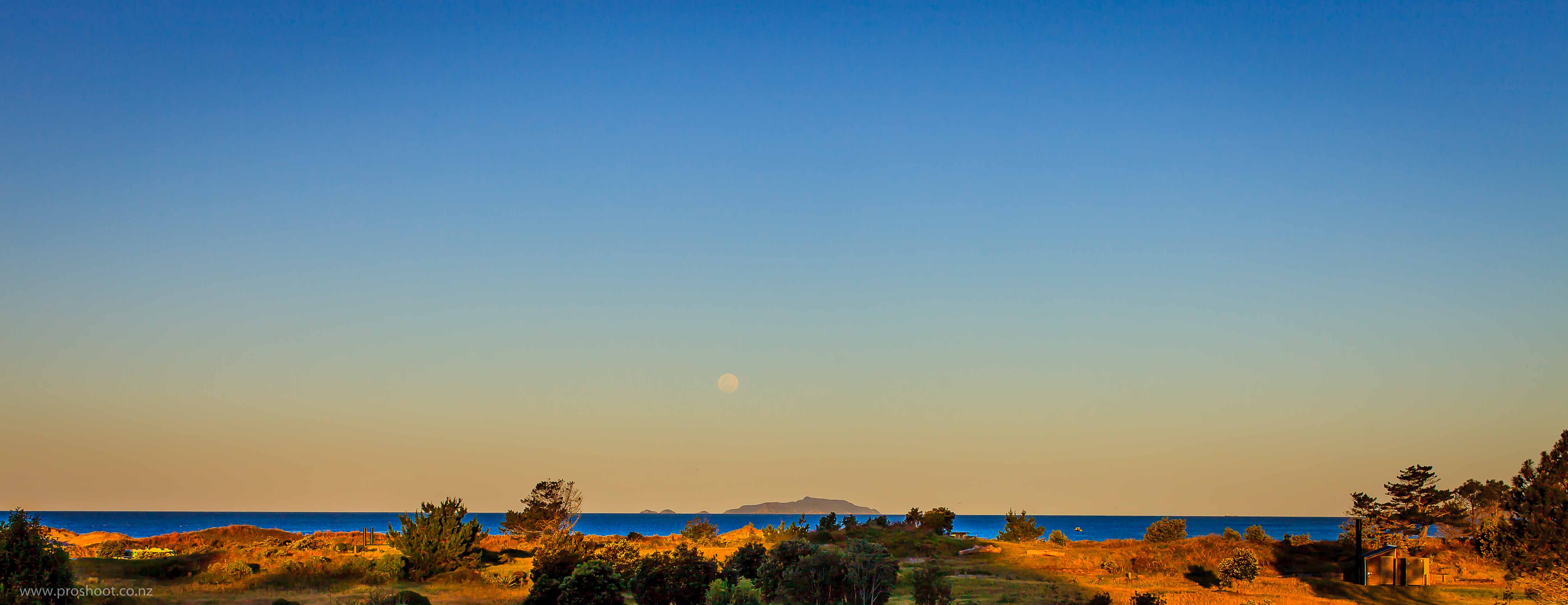
Hen and Chicken Islands from Department of Conservation Campsite, Uretiti, New Zealand.

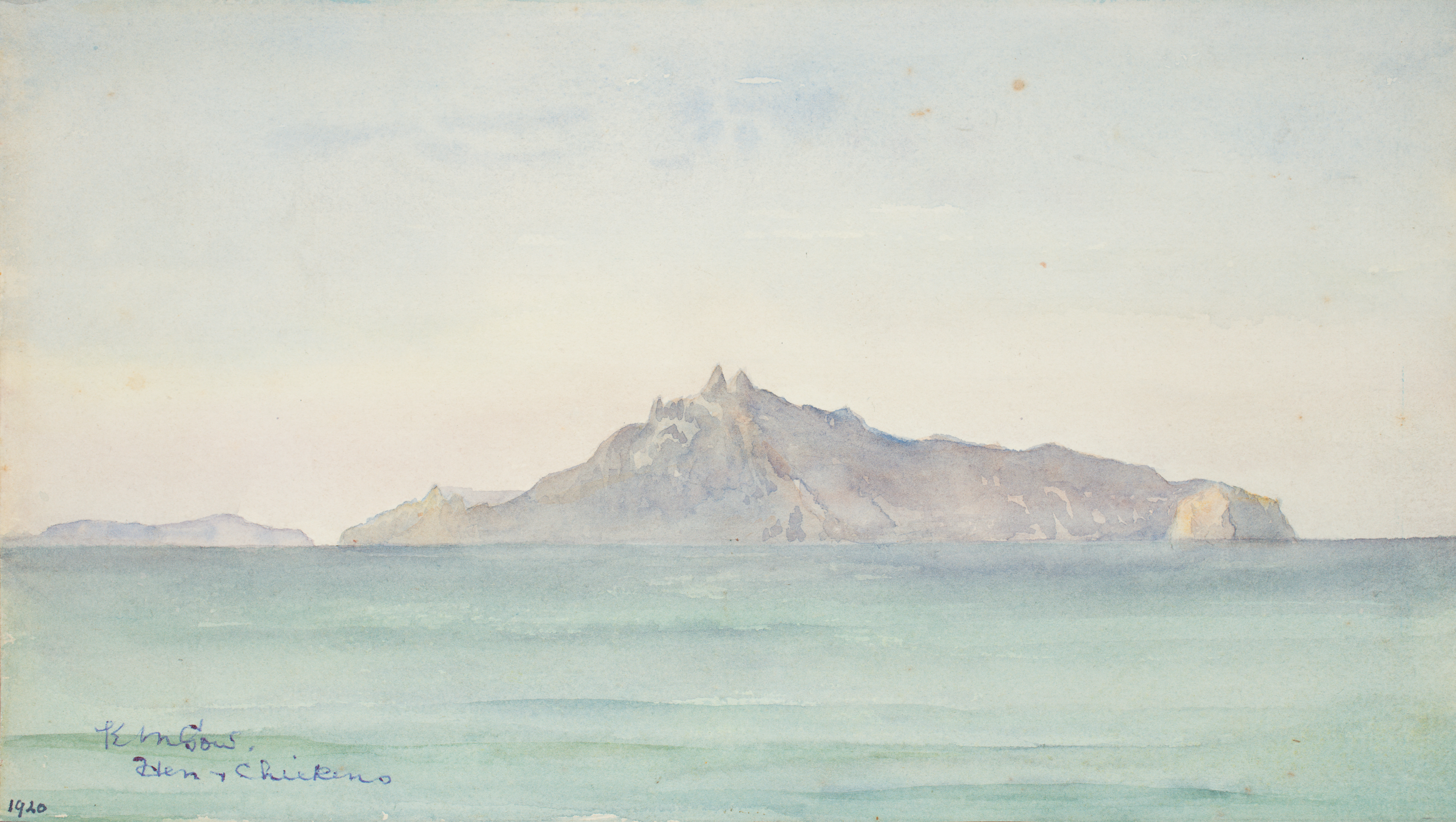
Hen and Chickens, 1920 watercolour by Kate Gow

== See also ==
- List of islands of New Zealand
- New Zealand outlying islands
