= Waipu, New Zealand =

Waipu
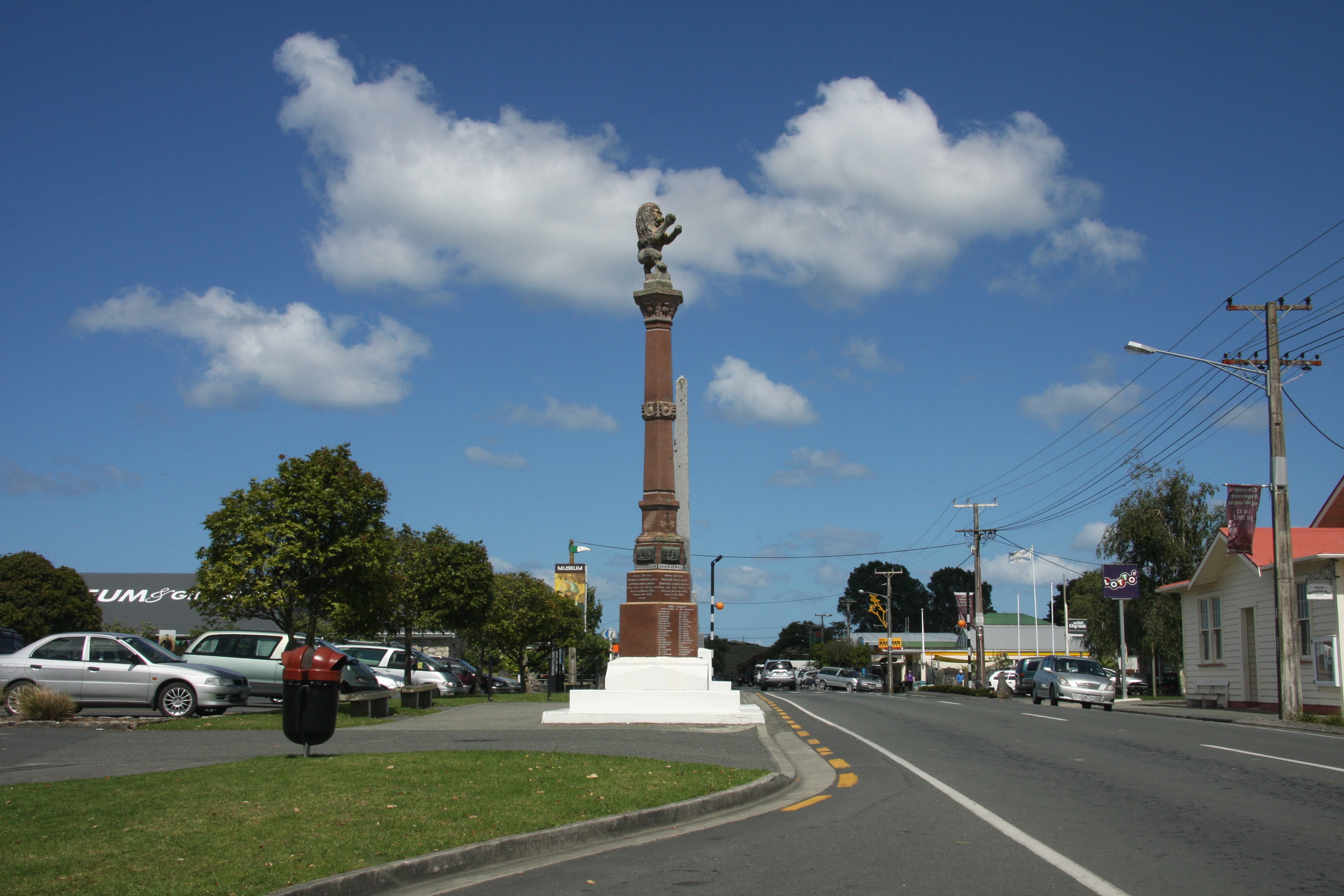
- Interactive map of Waipu
- Coordinates: 35°59′5″S 174°26′50″E
- Country: New Zealand
- Region: Northland Region
- District: Whangarei District
- Ward: Bream Bay Ward
- Electorates: Whangārei; Te Tai Tokerau

Government
  - Territorial Authority: Whangarei District Council
  - Regional council: Northland Regional Council
  - Mayor of Whangārei: Ken Couper
  - Whangārei MP: Shane Reti
  - Te Tai Tokerau MP: Mariameno Kapa-Kingi

Area
  - Total: 3.53 km^{2} (1.36 sq mi)

Population (June 2025)
  - Total: 1,450
  - Density: 411/km^{2} (1,060/sq mi)

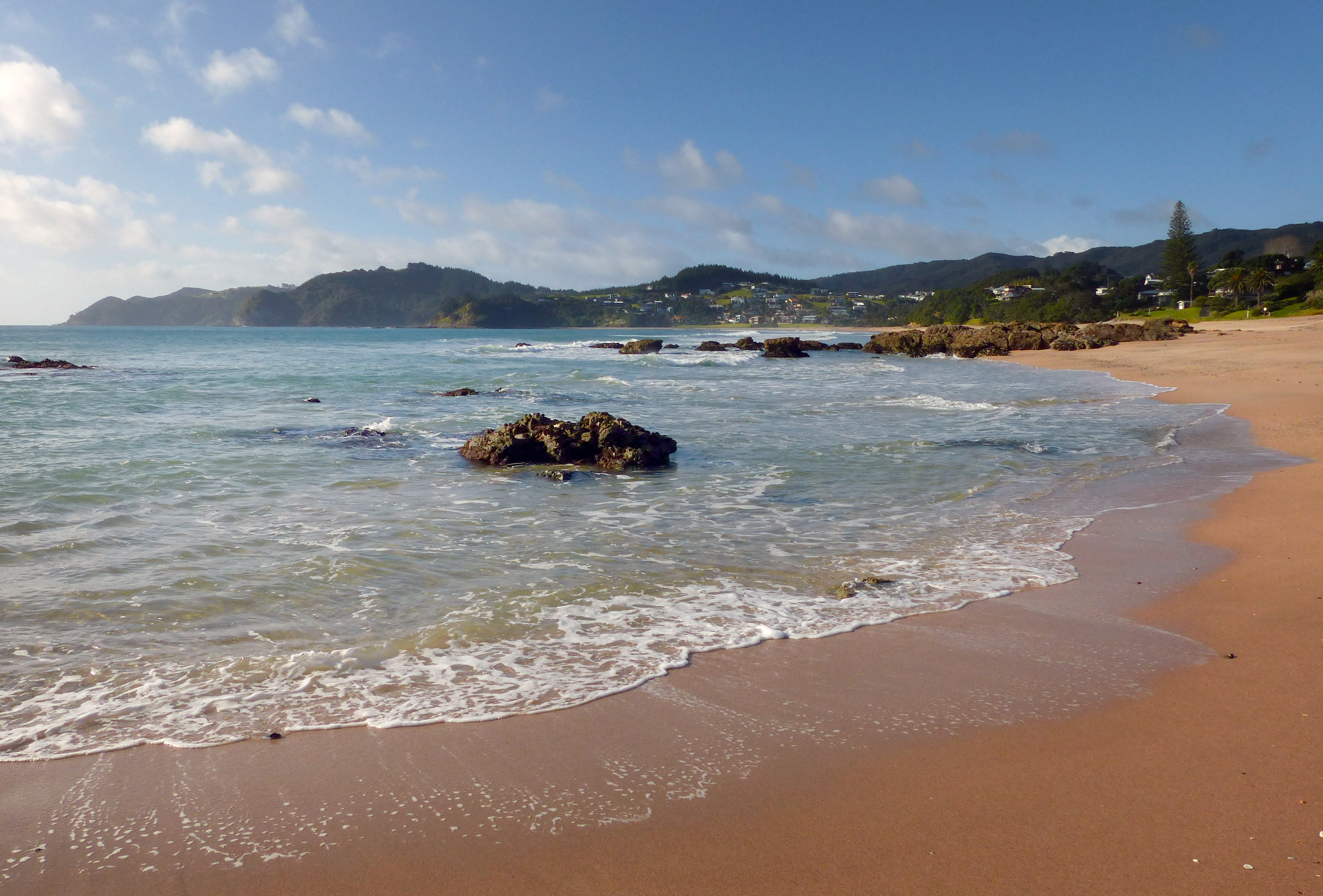
Langs Beach

Waipu (Māori: Waipū) is a small town in Bream Bay, in the Northland Region of New Zealand. The town has a Scottish heritage; a highlight of the town's calendar is the annual Highland Games held at New Year. Near the town are the Waipū Caves, which contain a significant population of glow worms.

== History ==
The local Māori hapū, Patuharakeke, are the descendants of Te Toru (also known as Urekuri), Te Taotahi and Te Pirihi Whakaariki. It is through the descendants of Te Toru that Patuharakeke are closely related to iwi including Ngapuhi, Ngati Wai, Ngati Whatua and Te Uri o Hau.

Waipu was the centre of a significant Presbyterian settlement led by Rev. Norman McLeod, a Presbyterian minister who led his people from the Highlands of Scotland to New Zealand via Pictou and St. Ann's in Nova Scotia and Australia. In 1854 the land was purchased by the crown and then on sold to the settlers. About 800 settlers arrived at Waipu in the 1850s. Waipu was a location for the late 19th/early 20th century kauri gum digging trade.

The Waipu Scottish Migration Museum was established in 1953.

== Waipu branch ==
In 1914, a railway branch line from the North Auckland Line was surveyed to Waipu to serve agricultural activity in the area. Construction of the Waipu branch line was delayed due to World War I, but by 1920, 25 men were employed in the construction of formation. However, by 1924, private motor vehicles were becoming more common and railway lines to sparsely populated rural areas accordingly became less necessary. Due to the lack of significant industrial activity in the Waipu area, the branch line was no longer seen as economic and construction was cancelled before any rail tracks were laid. A new railway line, the Marsden Point Branch, is currently proposed for construction and will follow a route similar to that of the abortive Waipu branch.

== Demographics ==
Statistics New Zealand describes Waipū as a small urban area. The urban area covers 3.53 km^{2} (1.36 sq mi) and had an estimated population of 1,450 as of June 2025, with a population density of 411 people per km^{2}.

Historical population for the urban area
Year	Pop.	±% p.a.
2006	735	—
2013	867	+2.39%
2018	1,065	+4.20%
2023	1,392	+5.50%
The 2006 population is for a smaller area of 2.90 km^{2} Source:

Waipū had a population of 1,392 in the 2023 New Zealand census, an increase of 327 people (30.7%) since the 2018 census, and an increase of 525 people (60.6%) since the 2013 census. There were 660 males, 726 females and 6 people of other genders in 588 dwellings. 2.4% of people identified as LGBTIQ+. The median age was 57.5 years (compared with 38.1 years nationally). There were 192 people (13.8%) aged under 15 years, 150 (10.8%) aged 15 to 29, 474 (34.1%) aged 30 to 64, and 576 (41.4%) aged 65 or older.

People could identify as more than one ethnicity. The results were 89.2% European (Pākehā); 17.9% Māori; 2.6% Pasifika; 3.9% Asian; 0.4% Middle Eastern, Latin American and African New Zealanders (MELAA); and 4.1% other, which includes people giving their ethnicity as "New Zealander". English was spoken by 98.1%, Māori language by 3.2%, and other languages by 8.4%. No language could be spoken by 1.5% (e.g. too young to talk). New Zealand Sign Language was known by 0.2%. The percentage of people born overseas was 23.3, compared with 28.8% nationally.

Religious affiliations were 31.2% Christian, 1.3% Hindu, 1.1% Māori religious beliefs, 0.6% Buddhist, 0.6% New Age, and 1.1% other religions. People who answered that they had no religion were 55.4%, and 9.1% of people did not answer the census question.

Of those at least 15 years old, 147 (12.2%) people had a bachelor's or higher degree, 639 (53.2%) had a post-high school certificate or diploma, and 351 (29.2%) people exclusively held high school qualifications. The median income was $28,600, compared with $41,500 nationally. 69 people (5.8%) earned over $100,000 compared to 12.1% nationally. The employment status of those at least 15 was that 399 (33.2%) people were employed full-time, 177 (14.8%) were part-time, and 18 (1.5%) were unemployed.

=== Waipū Rural statistical area ===
Waipū Rural statistical area, which includes Waipu Cove and Langs Beach and surrounds but does not include Waipū settlement, covers 133.08 km^{2} (51.38 sq mi) and had an estimated population of 1,940 as of June 2025, with a population density of 15 people per km^{2}.

Historical population for Waipū Rural
Year	Pop.	±% p.a.
2006	1,818	—
2013	1,215	−5.59%
2018	1,650	+6.31%
2023	1,869	+2.52%
The 2006 population is for a larger area of 136.61 km^{2}, including Waipū settlement. Source:

Waipū Rural had a population of 1,869 in the 2023 New Zealand census, an increase of 219 people (13.3%) since the 2018 census, and an increase of 654 people (53.8%) since the 2013 census. There were 945 males, 918 females and 3 people of other genders in 774 dwellings. 3.0% of people identified as LGBTIQ+. The median age was 54.9 years (compared with 38.1 years nationally). There were 255 people (13.6%) aged under 15 years, 195 (10.4%) aged 15 to 29, 882 (47.2%) aged 30 to 64, and 540 (28.9%) aged 65 or older.

People could identify as more than one ethnicity. The results were 92.6% European (Pākehā); 13.6% Māori; 3.2% Pasifika; 1.9% Asian; 1.0% Middle Eastern, Latin American and African New Zealanders (MELAA); and 2.7% other, which includes people giving their ethnicity as "New Zealander". English was spoken by 98.6%, Māori language by 2.1%, Samoan by 0.3%, and other languages by 6.6%. No language could be spoken by 1.3% (e.g. too young to talk). New Zealand Sign Language was known by 0.3%. The percentage of people born overseas was 20.2, compared with 28.8% nationally.

Religious affiliations were 27.4% Christian, 0.3% Hindu, 0.2% Islam, 0.3% Māori religious beliefs, 0.3% Buddhist, 0.8% New Age, 0.2% Jewish, and 1.0% other religions. People who answered that they had no religion were 61.6%, and 8.2% of people did not answer the census question.

Of those at least 15 years old, 339 (21.0%) people had a bachelor's or higher degree, 891 (55.2%) had a post-high school certificate or diploma, and 270 (16.7%) people exclusively held high school qualifications. The median income was $38,400, compared with $41,500 nationally. 228 people (14.1%) earned over $100,000 compared to 12.1% nationally. The employment status of those at least 15 was that 657 (40.7%) people were employed full-time, 312 (19.3%) were part-time, and 21 (1.3%) were unemployed.

== Education ==
Waipu School is a coeducational contributing primary (years 1–6) school with a roll of 246 students as of July 2026.

Schools were formed in the Waipu area at Bream Tail, Waipu Centre, The Braigh, North River and Waipu Cove. The schools at Bream Tail and Waipu Caves closed before 1930. The remaining schools, and one at Mata north of Ruakaka, were consolidated into Waipu District High School in 1940, which provided both primary and secondary education on a single site on St Mary's Road. Ruakaka School was originally intended to be included in the consolidation, but residents of Ruakaka resisted. In 1956, the secondary department moved to a new site in Argyle Street, although some secondary classes remained at the original site. By the late 1960s, Waipu was the largest District High School in the country and had inadequate facilities. The school was split at the beginning of 1972 to form the new Bream Bay College and Waipu Primary, with the high school shifting to new premises at Ruakaka in 1974. The primary school moved to the Argyle Street site.

== Notable people ==
Members of the metal band Alien Weaponry come from Waipu.

Fiona Kidman lived in Waipu for two years as a teenager. This inspired her book The Book of Secrets.
