= One Tree Point, New Zealand =

One Tree Point
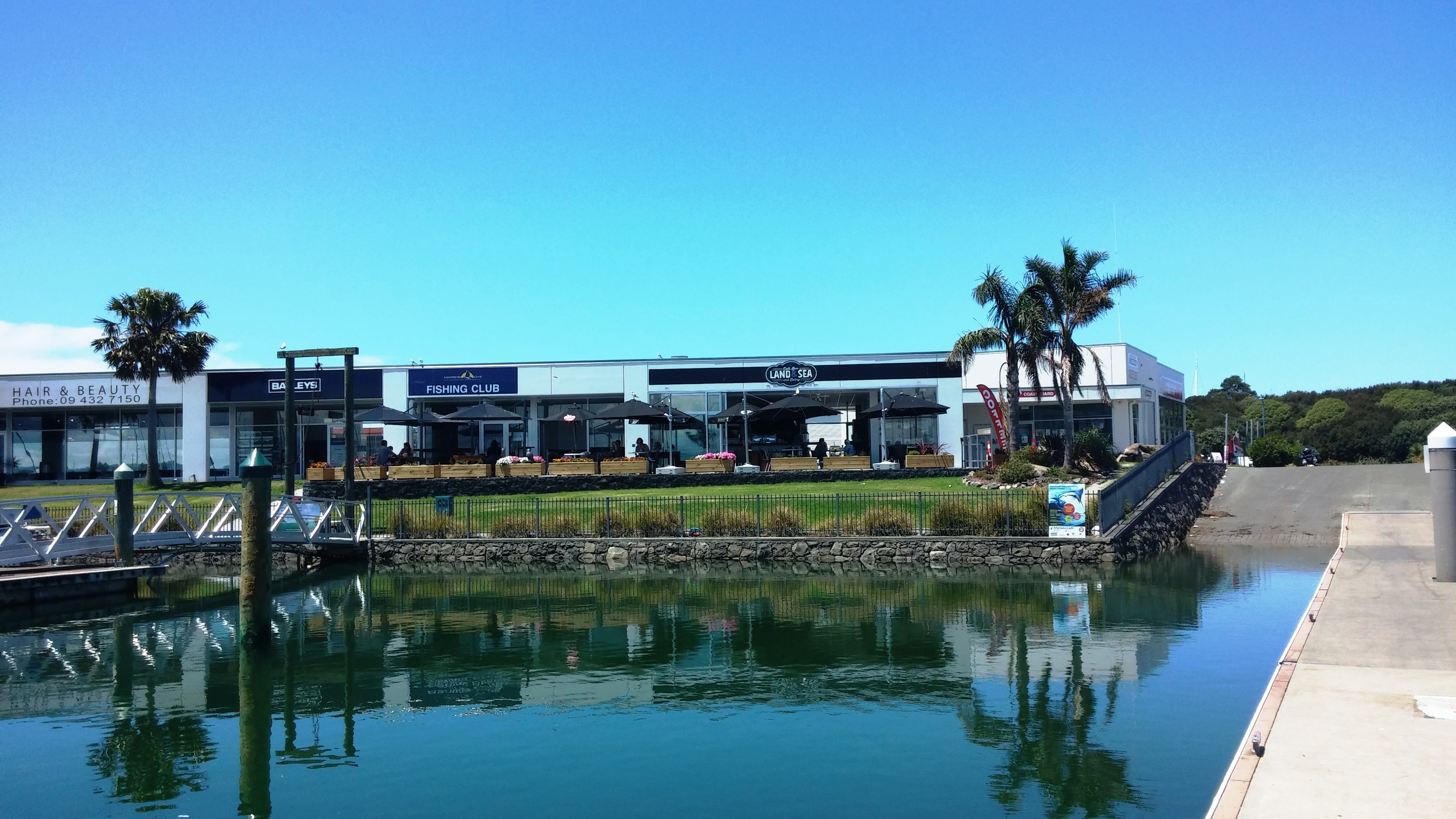
- Marsden Cove shops
- Interactive map of One Tree Point
- Coordinates: 35.819°S 174.454°E
- Country: New Zealand
- Region: Northland Region
- District: Whangarei District
- Ward: Bream Bay Ward
- Electorates: Whangārei; Te Tai Tokerau

Government
  - Territorial Authority: Whangarei District Council
  - Regional council: Northland Regional Council
  - Mayor of Whangārei: Ken Couper
  - Whangārei MP: Shane Reti
  - Te Tai Tokerau MP: Mariameno Kapa-Kingi

Area
  - Total: 2.91 km^{2} (1.12 sq mi)

Population (June 2025)
  - Total: 3,350
  - Density: 1,150/km^{2} (2,980/sq mi)

One Tree Point is a settlement on the southern side of Whangārei Harbour in Northland, New Zealand. The settlement includes the Marsden Point Marina.

== History ==
One Tree Point was called "Single Tree Point" by Captain Lort Stokes of the Acheron in 1849.

== Demographics ==
Statistics New Zealand describes One Tree Point as a small urban area. It covers 2.91 km^{2} (1.12 sq mi) and had an estimated population of 3,350 as of June 2025, with a population density of 1,151 people per km^{2}.

Historical population
Year	Pop.	±% p.a.
2006	912	—
2013	1,491	+7.27%
2018	2,217	+8.26%
2023	2,988	+6.15%
The 2006 population is for a smaller area of 2.59 km^{2} Source:

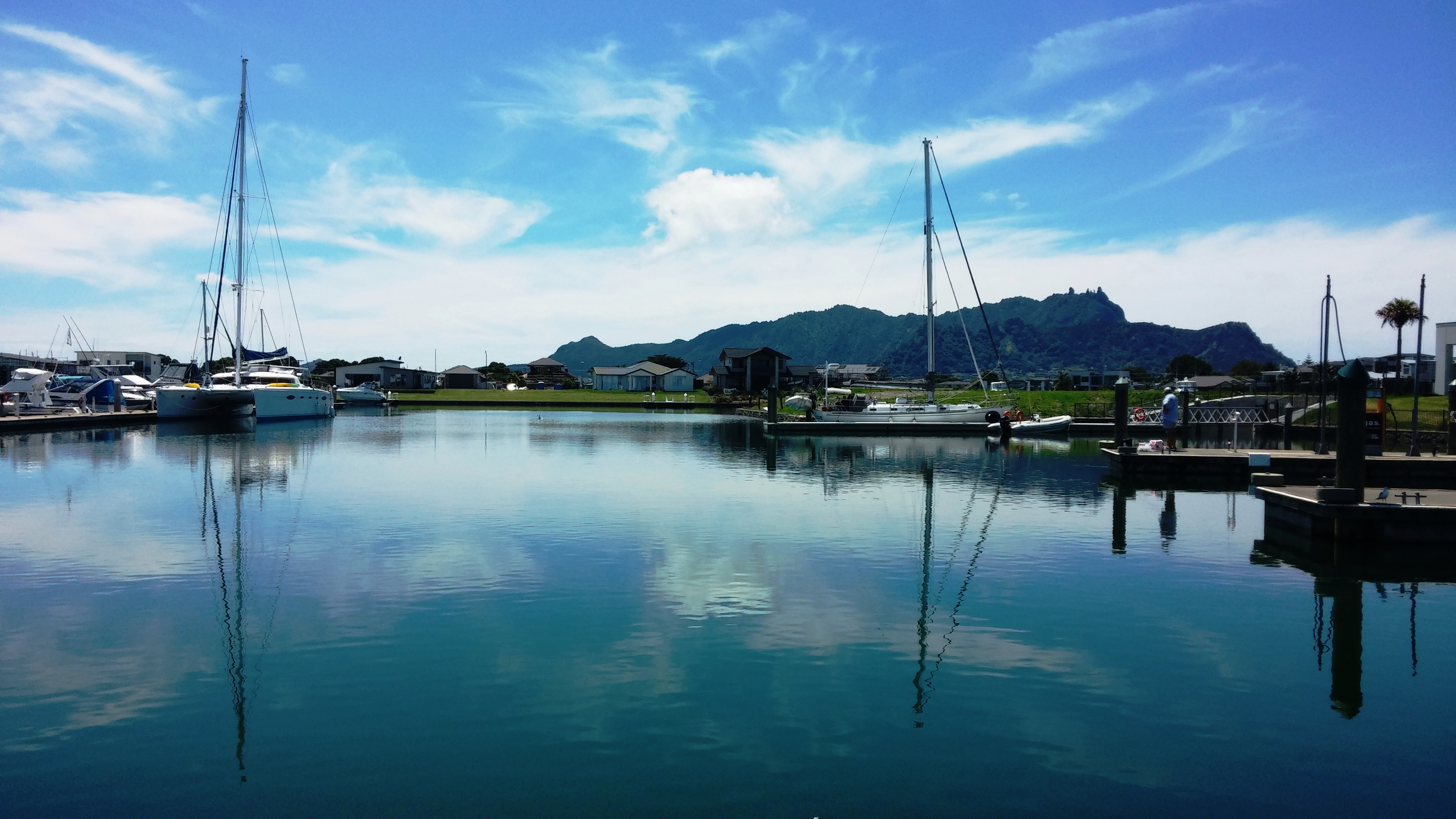
Marsden Cove marina

One Tree Point had a population of 2,988 in the 2023 New Zealand census, an increase of 771 people (34.8%) since the 2018 census, and an increase of 1,497 people (100.4%) since the 2013 census. There were 1,470 males, 1,509 females and 6 people of other genders in 1,188 dwellings. 1.3% of people identified as LGBTIQ+. The median age was 49.9 years (compared with 38.1 years nationally). There were 555 people (18.6%) aged under 15 years, 282 (9.4%) aged 15 to 29, 1,245 (41.7%) aged 30 to 64, and 909 (30.4%) aged 65 or older.

People could identify as more than one ethnicity. The results were 86.9% European (Pākehā); 19.5% Māori; 4.0% Pasifika; 5.2% Asian; 0.9% Middle Eastern, Latin American and African New Zealanders (MELAA); and 1.8% other, which includes people giving their ethnicity as "New Zealander". English was spoken by 97.6%, Māori language by 4.0%, Samoan by 0.4%, and other languages by 7.1%. No language could be spoken by 1.8% (e.g. too young to talk). New Zealand Sign Language was known by 0.4%. The percentage of people born overseas was 21.5, compared with 28.8% nationally.

Religious affiliations were 33.1% Christian, 0.6% Hindu, 0.1% Islam, 0.7% Māori religious beliefs, 0.3% Buddhist, 0.3% New Age, 0.1% Jewish, and 1.0% other religions. People who answered that they had no religion were 56.1%, and 7.6% of people did not answer the census question.

Of those at least 15 years old, 333 (13.7%) people had a bachelor's or higher degree, 1,353 (55.6%) had a post-high school certificate or diploma, and 627 (25.8%) people exclusively held high school qualifications. The median income was $37,800, compared with $41,500 nationally. 318 people (13.1%) earned over $100,000 compared to 12.1% nationally. The employment status of those at least 15 was that 1,035 (42.5%) people were employed full-time, 321 (13.2%) were part-time, and 27 (1.1%) were unemployed.

== Education ==
One Tree Point School is a coeducational contributing primary (years 1-6) school with a roll of 249 students as of July 2026. The school was established in 1972.
