= Whangarei District =

Coordinates: 35.719°S 174.309°E

- Territorial authority district
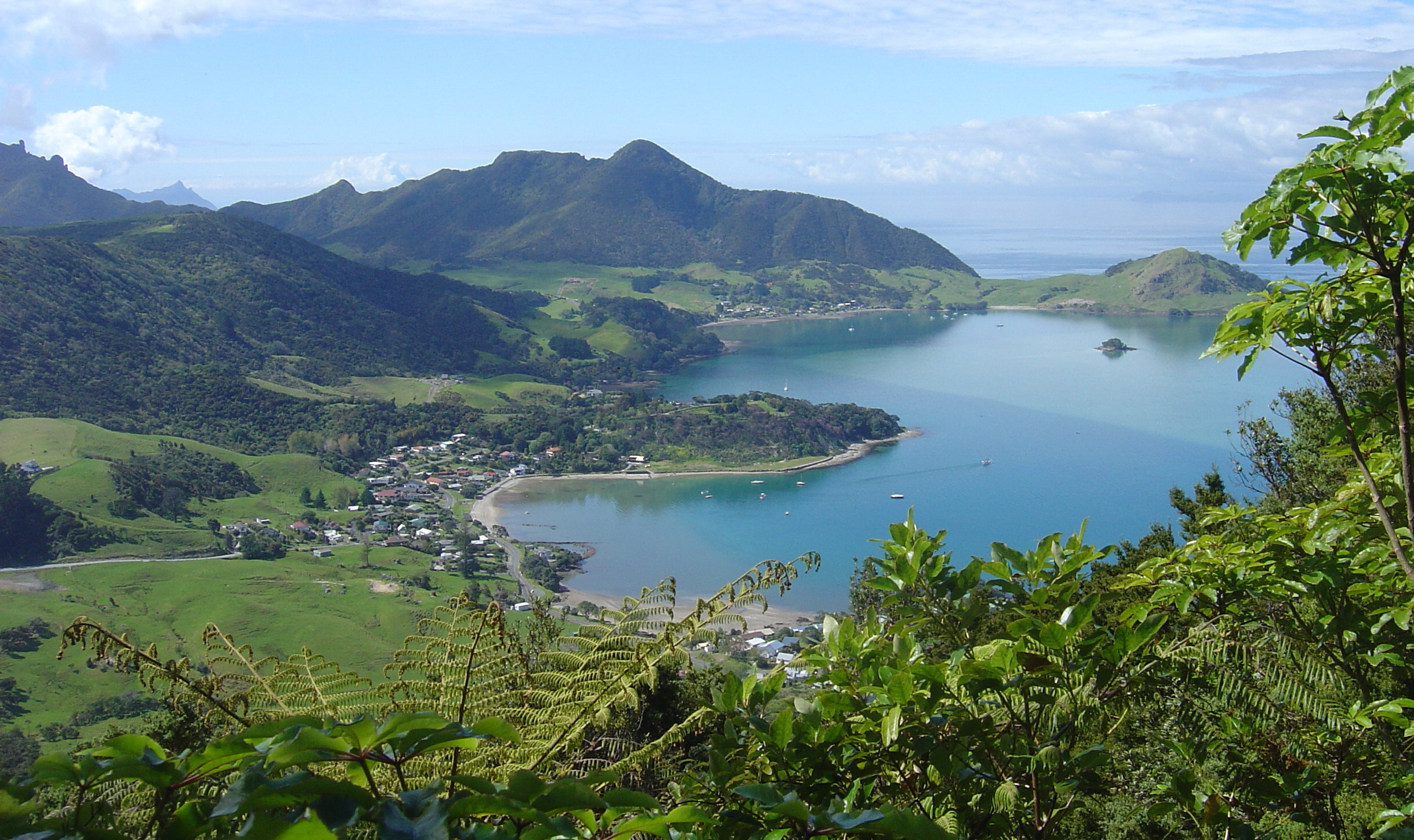
- Mt Lion at the Whangarei Heads as viewed from Mt Manaia

- Whangarei district within the North Island
- Country: New Zealand
- Region: Northland
- Wards: Māori; Bream Bay; Hikurangi-Coastal; Mangakahia-Maungatapere; Whangārei Heads; Whangārei Urban
- Local hapū: Ngāti Hine; Ngāti Wai; Patuharakeke; Te Parawhau
- Established: 1989
- Seat: Whangārei

Government
  - Mayor: Ken Couper
  - Territorial authority: Whangarei District Council

Area
  - Total: 2,855 km^{2} (1,102 sq mi)
  - Land: 2,711.44 km^{2} (1,046.89 sq mi)

Population
  - Estimate (June 2025): 100,600
- Postcode(s): Map of postcodes

Whangarei District is a territorial authority district in the Northland Region of New Zealand that is governed by the Whangarei District Council. The land is largely rural and makes up a fifth of the Northland Region. To the north is the Far North District, to the west and south is the Kaipara District, and to the east is the Pacific Ocean. Whangarei District extends southwards to the southern end of Bream Bay, northwards to Whangaruru, and westwards up the Mangakahia River valley past Pakotai towards the west coast. It includes the Hen and Chicken Islands and the Poor Knights Islands, both nature reserves.

The council seat and principal urban area is the city of Whangārei, population 56,100 in June 2025. The biggest towns are One Tree Point (3,350), Ruakākā (2,890), Hikurangi (1,640), Waipu (1,450) and Ngunguru (1,180). Smaller towns include Hūkerenui, Portland and Titoki. The district population was 100,600 in June 2025.

The largest coastal features are Bream Bay and Whangārei Harbour, which has its entrance at the northern end of the bay. There are numerous beaches along the ocean coast and the harbour. Tutukaka is a port for game fishing, and diving and sightseeing excursions. Motu Matakohe or Limestone Island in the harbour is being ecologically restored. The main airport is Whangarei Airport.

== Government ==
Whangarei District Council was formed by an amalgamation of Whangarei City Council, Whangarei County Council and Hikurangi Town Council as part of New Zealand's 1989 local government reforms.

There is a district-wide Māori ward and five general wards: Whangārei Urban in the city, Hikurangi-Coastal in the north, Mangakahia-Maungatapere inland to the west, Bream Bay in the south, and Whangārei Heads to the east of the city.

Ken Couper has been the mayor since 2025.

== Demographics ==
Whangarei District covers 2,711.44 km^{2} (1,046.89 sq mi) and had an estimated population of 100,600 as of June 2025, with a population density of 37 people per km^{2}.

Historical population
Year	Pop.	±% p.a.
2006	74,463	—
2013	76,995	+0.48%
2018	90,960	+3.39%
2023	96,678	+1.23%

Whangarei District had a population of 96,678 in the 2023 New Zealand census, an increase of 5,718 people (6.3%) since the 2018 census, and an increase of 19,683 people (25.6%) since the 2013 census. There were 47,211 males, 49,218 females and 252 people of other genders in 35,535 dwellings. 2.6% of people identified as LGBTIQ+. The median age was 41.6 years (compared with 38.1 years nationally). There were 19,140 people (19.8%) aged under 15 years, 15,465 (16.0%) aged 15 to 29, 41,829 (43.3%) aged 30 to 64, and 20,244 (20.9%) aged 65 or older.

People could identify as more than one ethnicity. The results were 76.3% European (Pākehā); 31.4% Māori; 4.5% Pasifika; 6.4% Asian; 0.7% Middle Eastern, Latin American and African New Zealanders (MELAA); and 2.3% other, which includes people giving their ethnicity as "New Zealander". English was spoken by 97.0%, Māori language by 7.5%, Samoan by 0.3% and other languages by 8.1%. No language could be spoken by 2.0% (e.g. too young to talk). New Zealand Sign Language was known by 0.6%. The percentage of people born overseas was 18.4, compared with 28.8% nationally.

Religious affiliations were 30.4% Christian, 1.0% Hindu, 0.3% Islam, 2.6% Māori religious beliefs, 0.5% Buddhist, 0.6% New Age, 0.1% Jewish, and 1.3% other religions. People who answered that they had no religion were 55.8%, and 7.6% of people did not answer the census question.

Of those at least 15 years old, 11,343 (14.6%) people had a bachelor's or higher degree, 43,365 (55.9%) had a post-high school certificate or diploma, and 19,200 (24.8%) people exclusively held high school qualifications. The median income was $36,500, compared with $41,500 nationally. 6,681 people (8.6%) earned over $100,000 compared to 12.1% nationally. The employment status of those at least 15 was that 35,892 (46.3%) people were employed full-time, 10,545 (13.6%) were part-time, and 2,256 (2.9%) were unemployed.

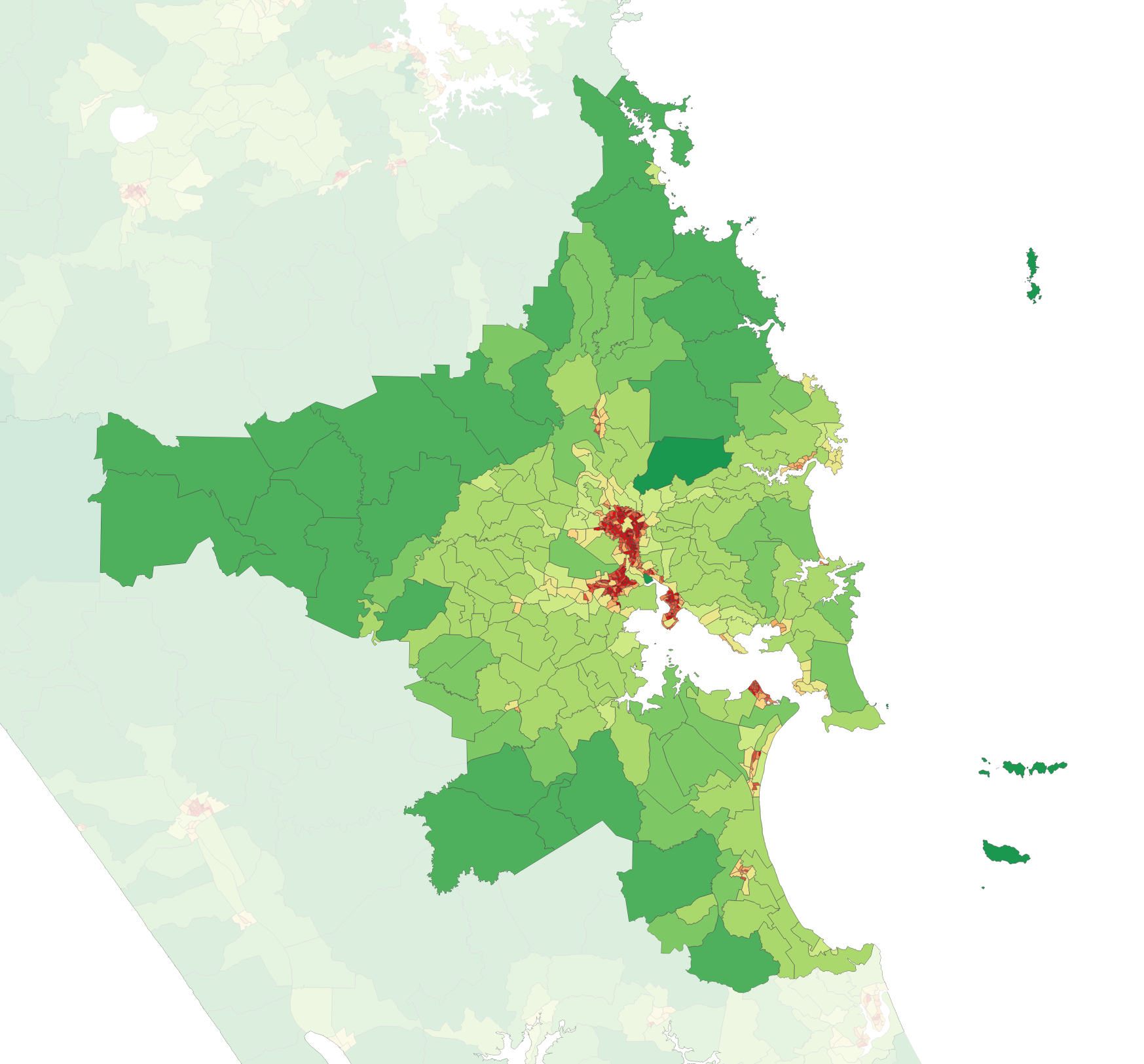
Population density in the 2023 census

Individual wards
Name	Area (km^{2})	Population	Density (per km^{2})	Dwellings	Median age	Median income
Mangakahia-Maungatapere General Ward	582.45	7,593	13	2,595	43.2 years	$41,800
Hikurangi-Coastal General Ward	987.46	13,704	14	4,839	43.2 years	$38,200
Whangārei Heads General Ward	271.77	7,743	28	2,925	48.7 years	$39,300
Whangārei Urban General Ward	56.50	52,089	922	19,215	38.0 years	$35,100
Bream Bay General Ward	813.27	15,552	19	5,967	48.4 years	$36,500
New Zealand					38.1 years	$41,500
