= Marsden Point Branch =

Rail line in Northland, New Zealand

Overview
- Status: Proposed, subject to funding
- Owner: KiwiRail (land); Previously KiwiRail-Northland Regional Council joint venture
- Termini: Oakleigh; Marsden Point

Service
- Rolling stock: None

Technical
- Line length: 16 km
- Character: Rural
- Track gauge: 3 ft 6 in (1,067 mm)

Map

The Marsden Point Branch is a 19 km (12 mi) branch line railway, proposed to be built in the Northland Region of New Zealand's North Island. It will diverge from the North Auckland Line at Oakleigh, south of Whangārei, and serve Northport at Marsden Point. The proposal has existed since the 1970s and land for the rail corridor is being actively purchased.

In October 2017, the new Labour–NZ First coalition government announced that it would spend $600 million on rehabilitating the North Auckland Line and building the branch at a cost of $200 million, the total works to cost $800 million. In June 2021 it was announced that the line would be built and was expected to take about 5 years. In April 2023 it was announced that KiwiRail was "progressing" the business case for the branch.

== Early 20th century ==
The Marsden Point proposal has been preceded by two earlier lines: the Onerahi Branch of 1911–33, and a proposed Waipu Branch that was partially built and then abandoned. The former was built for the same purpose as the Marsden Point Branch: better harbour access for Whangarei. In 1885, the government officially acknowledged that the wharf serving the Whangarei to Kamo railway line (later part of the North Auckland Line) was inadequate for the purpose it served and an alternative in deeper water was necessary. This was found at Onerahi, but construction was not approved until 1899 and the branch opened on 2 October 1911. The port served coastal shipping between Whangarei and Auckland, and when the North Auckland Line was completed in 1925 and provided a quicker overland route, traffic switched from ships to the railway and the wharf suffered a decline. The Great Depression further ruined the port's fortunes, and with insubstantial traffic, the Onerahi Branch closed on 30 June 1933.

Although the Onerahi Branch mirrors the Marsden Point Branch in purpose, the Marsden Point proposal more closely follows the route of the proposed Waipu branch. The branch was intended to serve agricultural interests and was surveyed in 1914. After World War I, work began and formation was established. At least 25 men were at work on the line's construction in 1920. A lack of government will doomed the line, and before any track was laid it was cancelled in 1924.

== 1970s proposals ==
After the oil crisis of October 1973, a proposal was made that the Marsden Point B power station could use coal from the Waikato rather than oil. The railway is used elsewhere to carry high volumes of Waikato coal, and the quantity required if the conversion took place would have almost certainly required coal to be carried by rail. The proposal was abandoned. In 1979, another proposal was made to establish a deepwater port at Marsden Point to export forestry products and the plan was resurrected. The branch to the port would have been an approximately 14 km long, and was shelved due to a lack of development of the port.

== 1980s proposals ==
In 1981 the NZR released a proposal for a 17 km branch line to the Marsden Port terminal from Oakleigh, 13.7 km south of Whangarei. After studying coastal and inland routes, the report proposed an inland route through hills, marshy flats and farmland with a tunnel, five rail bridges, at least two road bridges and several culverts. The route would leave Oakleigh parallel to State Highway One for 3 km, cross Mata Creek, curve under Hewlett's Ridge in a tunnel, cross the Ruakaka River about 6 km from Oakleigh, pass farmland up to One Tree Point Road and swing east to parallel McEwen Road before crossing the road to enter the terminal. The report was prepared by the Auckland firm of Kingston, Reynolds, Thom and Allardice, following recommendations of the Northland Forestry Port Study in 1979.

== 2000s proposals ==
In the early 2000s, the 1979 proposal was revived. In 2003, a feasibly study was undertaken, and it estimated that a 16 km line to Marsden Point from a junction with the North Auckland Line 25 km south of Whangarei in Oakleigh would cost NZ$86.5 million. Environmental issues include the need to cross a portion of wetland, and some substantial earthworks would be required for a cutting through a hill, but the line would remove a large number of trucks from local roads and provide a boost to local employment. The proposal was delayed in June 2006 when ONTRACK (now KiwiRail Network) declined to approve land designation for the line. ONTRACK wanted greater certainty about potential freight tonnages from potential users of the line such as the Marsden Point Oil Refinery and Carter Holt Harvey. By August 2006 both the Northland Regional Council and ONTRACK had entered into talks with interested parties.

The result of these talks was positive and in August 2007 the Council began work to purchase land for the proposed route. ONTRACK subsequently confirmed that once the land is acquired it will designate the route as a rail corridor. On 27 November 2007 ONTRACK and the Council confirmed that they were entering into a joint venture arrangement to progress the land designation process and share the costs of land acquisition. A commitment to build the line will be made once the corridor is designated.

=== Designation ===
In late 2008, ONTRACK served a notice of requirement to Whangarei District Council for the route's rail designation, seen as an important legal step towards the eventual line. This process began in January 2009 and was completed later that year.

== 2010s proposals ==
Land acquisition began following the KiwiRail designation of the route in 2009. New Zealand First candidate and leader (and former Northland MP) Winston Peters has proposed the construction of the line from 2015 to 2017.

=== Land acquisition ===
In 2011, the joint venture to acquire land for the branch was formed between KiwiRail (as the successor to ONTRACK) and the Northland Regional Council, and properties along the route were acquired. In 2020, the government announced $40 million to purchase land along the corridor.

=== Northland by-election ===
Construction of the line featured in the Northland by-election, 2015. New Zealand First candidate and leader Winston Peters argued the line should be built to carry containers from NorthPort to Auckland. In response the New Zealand Taxpayers' Union claimed that Peters had never visited NorthPort, confused the port with the closed Port of Whangarei, and that Northport's CEO had stated that NorthPort "does not want a rail link" and that the line "does not feature in the Port's 30-year plan."

NorthPort responded to these claims by stating that while the line "is not a short-term priority" for Northport, the company supported "the designation of the rail corridor" as it fits with the company's strategy of long-term growth. The company confirmed Peters had never visited the port.

=== 2017 general election ===
The matter became an issue during campaigning for the 2017 general election. On 31 August 2017, New Zealand First party leader Winston Peters announced a policy of relocating the Port of Auckland to Marsden Point by 2027. Peters had vowed in July that the building of the Marsden Point Branch at a cost of up to $1 billion was non-negotiable in any post–election coalition between NZ First and either National or Labour.

As part of the Labour-NZ First coalition agreement for the Sixth Labour Government, there was a feasibility study of moving the Port of Auckland to Northport, with upgrades of road and rail to Northport.

=== Feasibility study ===
The interim report of the feasibility study investigating moving the Port of Auckland to Northport was published in April 2019. The interim report noted that further investment in Northport was not feasible without investment in the construction of the Marsden Point Branch and upgrades to the North Auckland Line.

=== Ministry of Transport Business Case ===
A business case for the upgrade of the North Auckland Line and the Marsden Point Branch's construction was prepared by New Zealand Ministry of Transport and published May 2019. The business case found the total cost of the upgrade and Marsden Point line would be NZ$1.3 billion, with a benefit-cost ratio of 1.19 (assuming NorthPort's expansion goes ahead), meaning for every $1.00 spent there would be a return of $1.19. The estimated cost of the line was $300m.

A KiwiRail arranged geotechnical survey carried out four test drills in December 2018 and January 2019 to check the land along the route. At completion, a press conference was held by minister Shane Jones plus KiwiRail chairman Greg Miller and acting Chief Executive Todd Moyle; although "the numbers still had to be crunched" before any announcement on construction was made.

=== Northland Rail rejuvenation project ===
The Northland Rail rejuvenation project funding announced in January 2020 includes $40 million for land purchase on the Marsden Point/Northport rail route. KiwiRail has said that trains could be running to Marsden Point by 2023. In July 2020 it was announced that land purchased by the Northland Regional Council for the line had been purchased by KiwiRail, who have also engaged a real estate company, The Property Group, to purchase the remaining land for the route.

== Passenger traffic ==
In addition to freight traffic, there is also the possibility of passenger services. The last passenger trains to service Whangarei were mixed trains and were cancelled in 1976. However, Northland Regional Land Transport Committee chairman Bill Rossiter suggested in February 2006 that passenger trains could be introduced (in the long term) for commuters between Ruakaka and Whangarei. The population of Ruakaka and surrounds was expected to grow by 15,000 in the ten years from 2007, although the population at the 2018 census was only 2,586. Proposals for commercial precincts, residential subdivisions, and a tertiary education centre then led to calls for a commuter rail service and industrial development that would require a rail-road freight transit centre.

The Helensville railway station at the western extremity of Auckland's commuter network was New Zealand's northernmost main-line passenger railway station until services were reduced to Waitakere railway station in 2010; and to Swanson railway station in 2015 (because of low passenger traffic to Waitakere, and the expense of increasing clearance in the Waitakere tunnel for electrification).

== See also ==
- North Auckland Line
- Dargaville Branch
- Donnellys Crossing Section/Branch
- Ōkaihau Branch
- Onerahi Branch
- Opua Branch
