= Kawakawa River =

Coordinates: 35°20′S 174°06′E

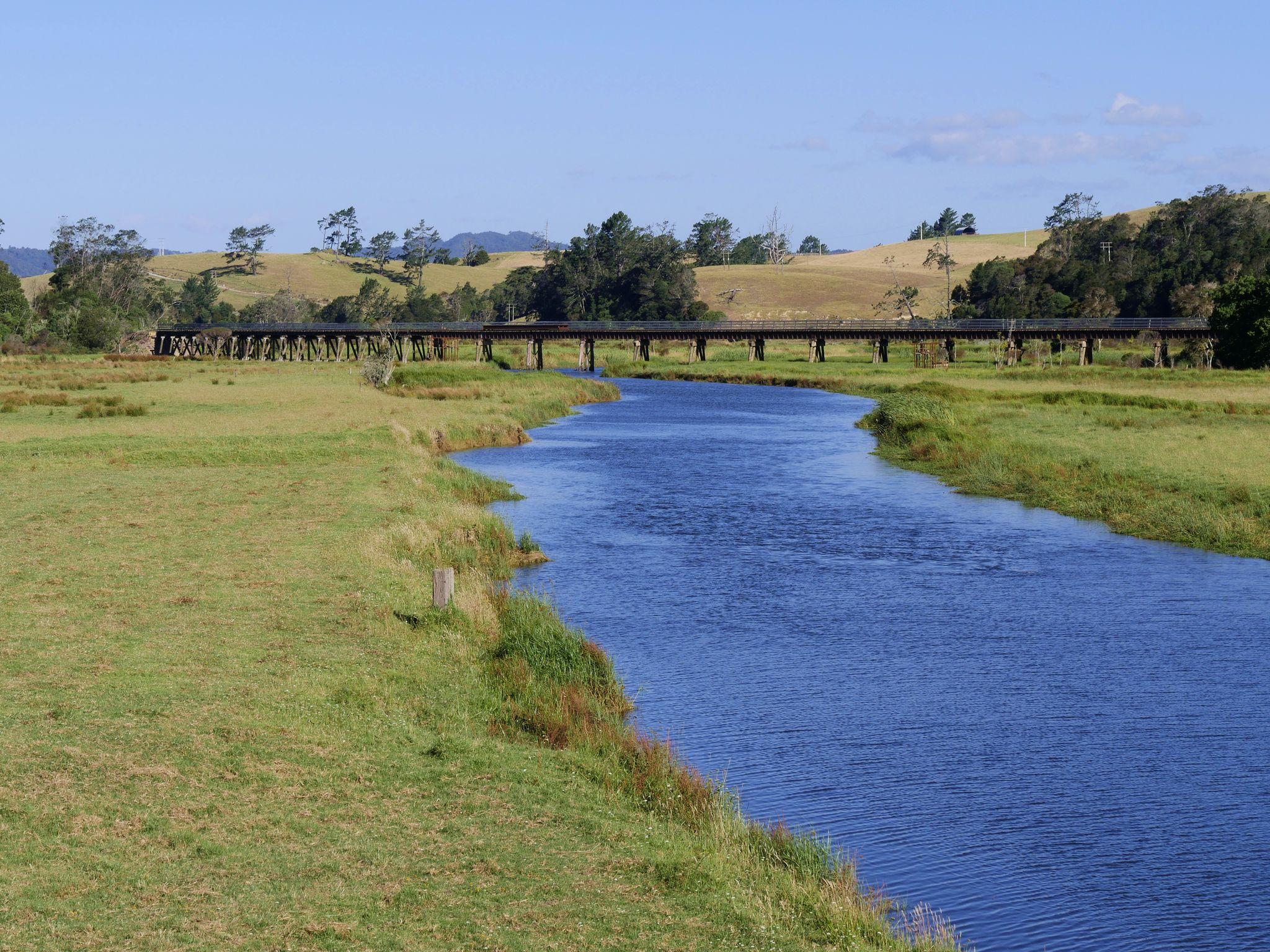
- Railway bridge at Taumarere

Location
- Country: New Zealand

Physical characteristics
- Source: Mount Hikurangi
  - elevation: 631 m (2,070 ft)
- Mouth
  - location: Bay of Islands
- Basin size: 443 km^{2} (171 sq mi)

The Kawakawa River is in the Northland Region of New Zealand's North Island. It flows predominantly eastward to Opua, where it joins the Waikare Inlet to flow into the Veronica Channel at the southern end of the Bay of Islands.

The river starts near the town of Kawakawa, at the convergence of the Otiria and Waiharakeke Streams, and is soon joined by the Waiomio Stream. About half the river's length is an estuary, over 500 m (550 yd) wide in places. The estuary is joined by that of the Karetu River. The name was officially gazetted on 21 June 2019.

Long Bridge, the longest wooden railway bridge in the Southern Hemisphere, crosses the river at Taumarere as part of the Bay of Islands Vintage Railway. The river is tidal up to the Long Bridge.

== See also ==
- List of rivers of New Zealand
