= Marsden A =

Former oil-fired power station in New Zealand

Marsden A Power Station
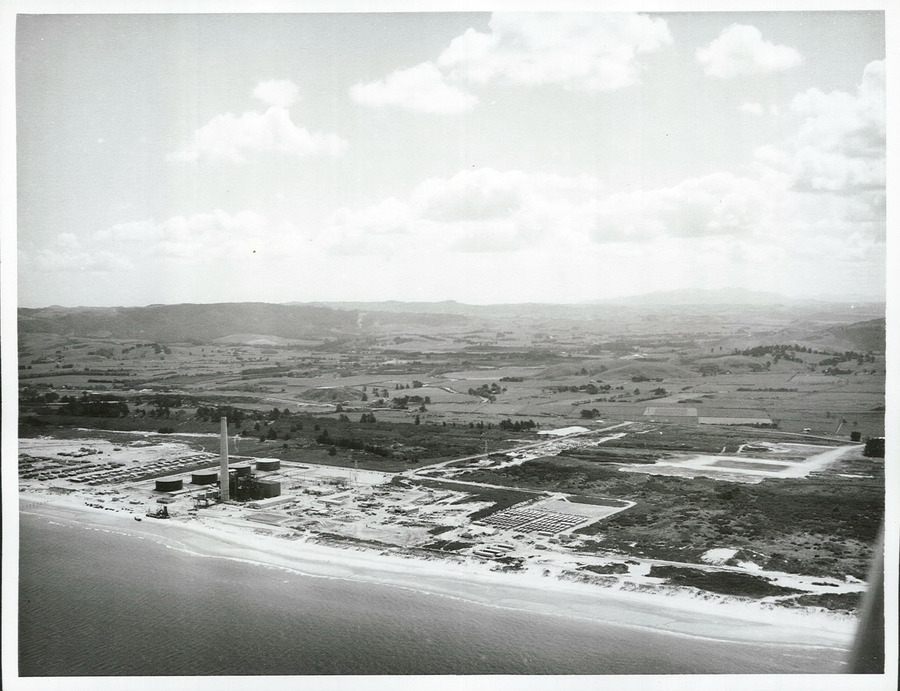
- Country: New Zealand
- Location: Marsden Point, Northland
- Coordinates: 35.875474°S 174.468041°E
- Status: Decommissioned
- Construction began: 1964
- Commission date: 1967
- Decommission date: 1994
- Owner: Mighty River Power

Thermal power station
- Primary fuel: Fuel oil

Power generation
- Units operational: 2×
- Nameplate capacity: 250 MW

Marsden A was a 250 MW oil-fired power station near the Marsden Point Oil Refinery at Marsden Point, Ruakaka, Northland, New Zealand. The facility was previously owned and operated by the Electricity Corporation of New Zealand and Mighty River Power.

The power station was proposed by the Power Planning Committee in 1964, with the Ministry of Works seeking contractors for construction in January 1965. The two 120 MW turbo-generators were provided by Allgemeine Elektricitats-Gessellschaft, and the boilers by Babcock & Wilcox and Goldie-McCulloch. It was built between 1964 and 1966 and commissioned in 1967. When completed, its chimney was the tallest in Aotearoa. The power station was designed to use heavy oil residue left over from the refining process, and was considered a white elephant on its completion, due to under-use.

It acted as an emergency reserve power station, serving the load centre of Auckland to the south. It was cooled through a long seawater pipe out into Bream Bay, which is now used to supply an aquaculture industry nearby. Following the commissioning of the dual coal- and gas-fired Huntly power station in 1982, Marsden A became less used, and it was mothballed in the 1990s due to rising oil prices. Ownership was transferred to Mighty River Power following the breakup on ECNZ in 1999.

It continued to provide grid support to Transpower's national grid in Northland, before being finally decommissioned in 2007. It was finally demolished in 2012, and the site sold in 2014.

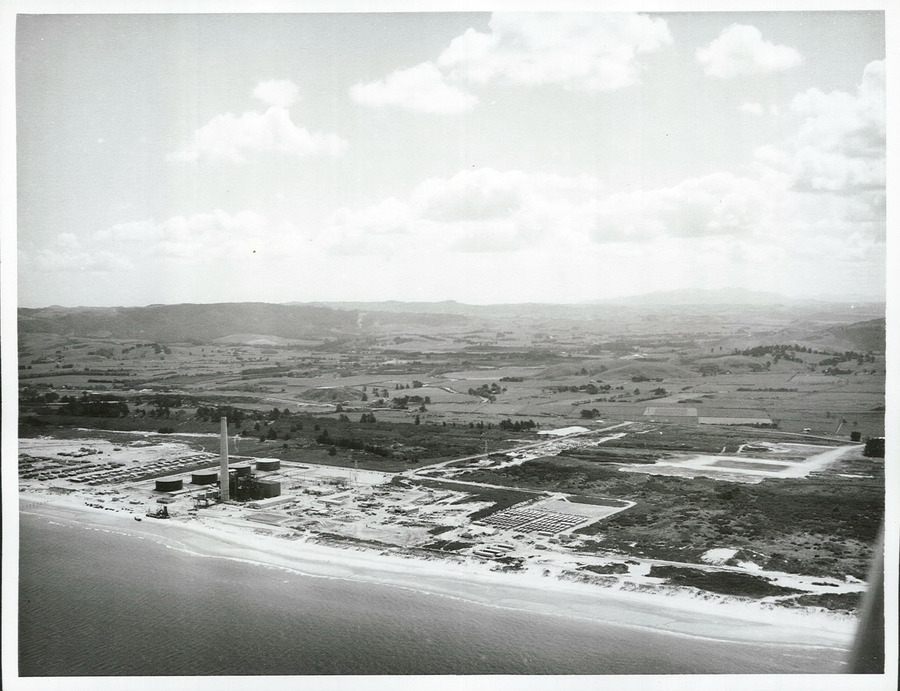
The power station before being commissioned in 1967

== See also ==
- Marsden B
