= North Auckland Line =

Railway line in New Zealand

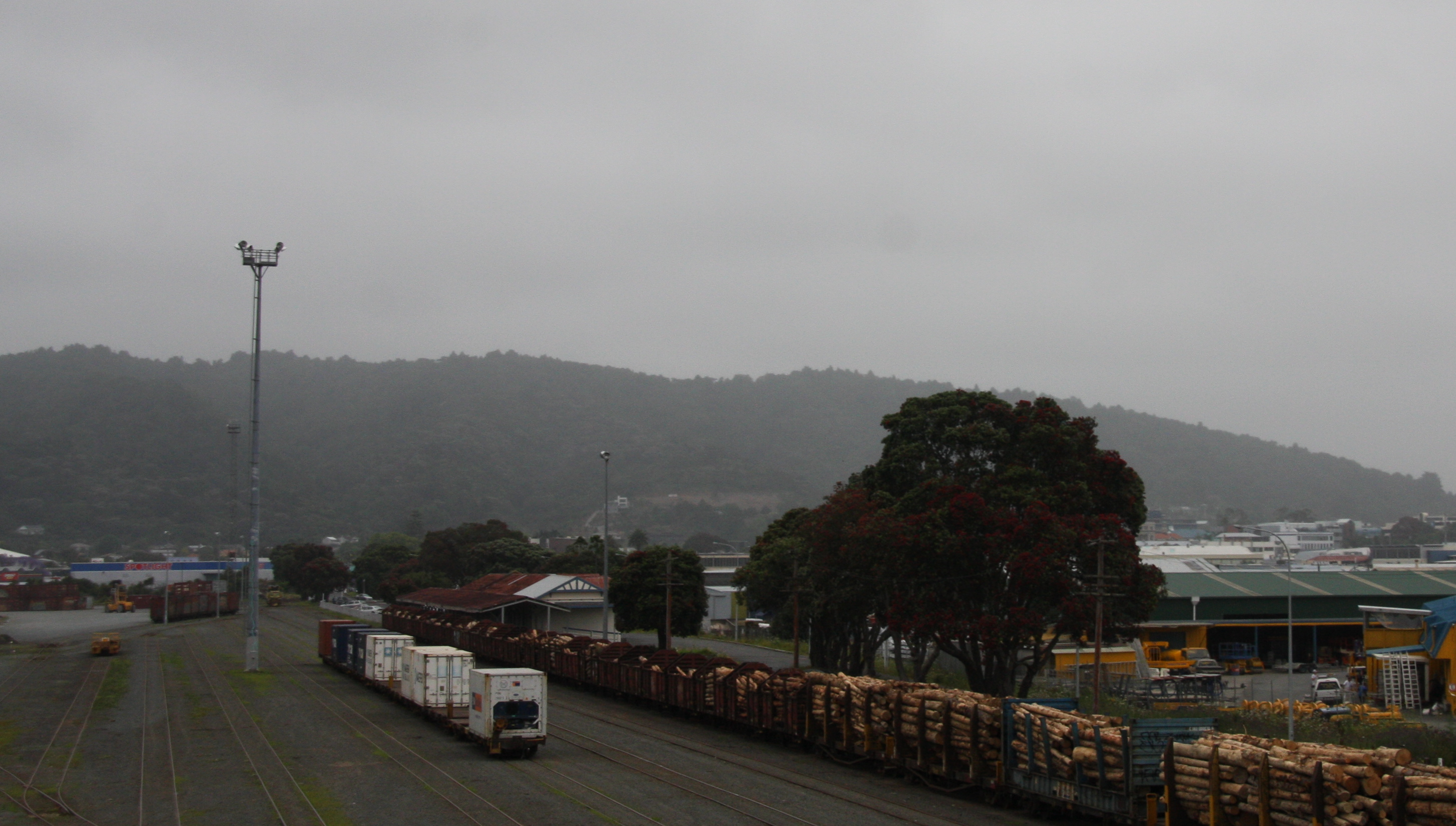
- Whangārei railway yard in 2012

Overview
- Status: Operational
- Owner: KiwiRail
- Locale: North Island, New Zealand
- Termini: Westfield Junction (Auckland); Otiria (Northland)
- Connecting lines: Port Whangarei Branch; Dargaville Branch; North Island Main Trunk; East Link; Newmarket Line; Onehunga Branch; Southdown Branch

Service
- Type: Heavy rail
- System: KiwiRail
- Operators: KiwiRail; Auckland One Rail (Westfield Junction to Swanson)

History
- Opened: 1868-03-02 (Kawakawa to Taumarere); 1884-04-07 (Taumarere to Opua); 1880-03-29 (Newmarket to Glen Eden); 1880-12-21 (Glen Eden to Henderson); 1881-07-13 (Henderson to Helensville); 1925-11-29 (line completed)

Technical
- Line length: 280.76 km (174.46 mi)
- Num of tracks: Double track (Westfield to Swanson); Single track (Swanson to Otiria Junction)
- Track gauge: 3 ft 6 in (1,067 mm)
- Electrification: 25 kV AC (Westfield to Swanson)

Map

The North Auckland Line (designation NAL) is a major section of New Zealand's national rail network, and is made up of the following parts: the portion of track that runs northward from Westfield Junction to Newmarket Station; from there, westward to Waitakere; from there, northward to Otiria via Whangārei. The first section was opened in 1868 and the line was completed in 1925. The line, or sections of it, have been known at various times as the Kaipara Line, the Waikato-Kaipara Line, the Kaipara Branch and the North Auckland Main Trunk.

North Auckland Line is a designation for the section of track, not a service route. The southernmost portion from Westfield Junction to Newmarket was originally built as part of the North Island Main Trunk railway, with Newmarket serving as the junction of the two lines. The North Island Main Trunk was re-routed in 1930 via the Westfield Deviation through Glen Innes and Panmure. Westfield-Newmarket was then incorporated into the North Auckland Line, and Newmarket-Auckland became the Newmarket Line, which today connects the North Auckland Line to Waitematā.

Three passenger lines of Auckland's suburban rail network make use of the North Auckland Line. South City Line services travel on it between Westfield Junction and Grafton Station. Onehunga West Line services travel on it between Penrose Station and Henderson Station. East West Line services travel on it between Swanson Station and Maungawhau Station.

The North Auckland Line previously continued to Opua in the Bay of Islands, with the section from Otiria to Opua sometimes known as the Opua Branch. It is now owned by the Bay of Islands Vintage Railway but regular operations were suspended in 2001, with resumption on a short section of the line in 2008.

The North Auckland Line was under review as part of KiwiRail's turnaround plan. In 2020, the government announced $109.7 million for upgrades to the line, focussing on rebuilding and lowering the floors of 13 tunnels along the line to enable hi-cube containers. A container terminal is to be built at Otiria. A new branch line, the Marsden Point Branch, will serve Northport, a deepwater port at Marsden Point, by diverging from the North Auckland Line south of Whangarei at Oakleigh.

In 2023 the NAL was expected to be out of action to at least June after floods in January; (see 2023 Auckland Anniversary Weekend floods), and it was announced that KiwiRail was "progressing" the business case for the new Marsden Branch.

== Branch lines ==
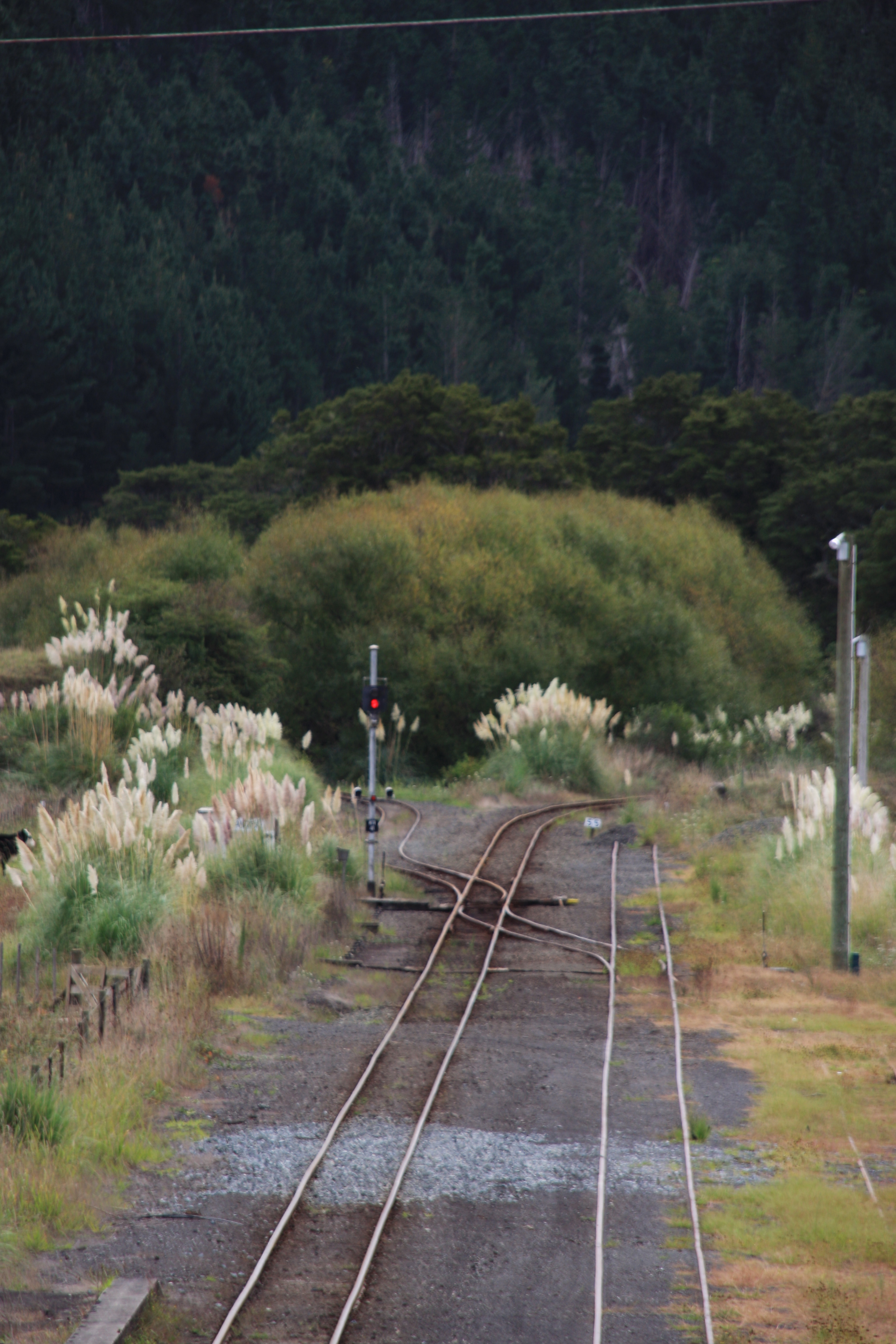
Junction of the Dargaville Branch and North Auckland Line in Waiōtira, 2010: the main line runs through the photo, curving to the right, while the branch turns away to the left.

Three branch lines are on the line:

- The Onehunga Branch line connects with the North Auckland Line at Penrose and forms part of the route of Onehunga Line suburban passenger train services operating between Newmarket and Onehunga.
- The Newmarket Line meets the North Auckland Line at Newmarket and provides a connection with Waitematā.
- Further north, the Dargaville Branch branches off in Waiotira. It is currently mothballed, with a portion in use by a tourist rail cart operator. The Dargaville Branch also possessed a branch of its own until 1959, built by the Kaihu Valley Railway Co., and running northwestwards to Kaihu and Donnelly's Crossing.

The Okaihau Branch formerly left the North Auckland Line in Otiria and the Riverhead branch in Kumeū.

== Construction ==
It took many years to build a complete line to serve the Northland Region, with different sections being developed at different times. Eventually, it became clear that a mainline was required to link these isolated railways to improve transport for both passengers and freight to and from New Zealand's northernmost region, and to open up land for greater economic development.

A line north of Helensville from Maungaturoto towards Maungatapere of about 20 miles (32 km) was authorised by the Railways Authorisation Act, 1904.

However, the construction was not without criticism. In 1910, the Minister of Railways himself criticised the project, arguing that the project of extending it would bring little benefit, as most traffic from north of Auckland was already covered by only going as far as Helensville, while country to the north was poor and would not be able to support the line.

Many sections of the line were considered technically challenging, especially the tunnels, construction of which had been called "notorious" at the time.

=== Kawakawa–Taumarere ===
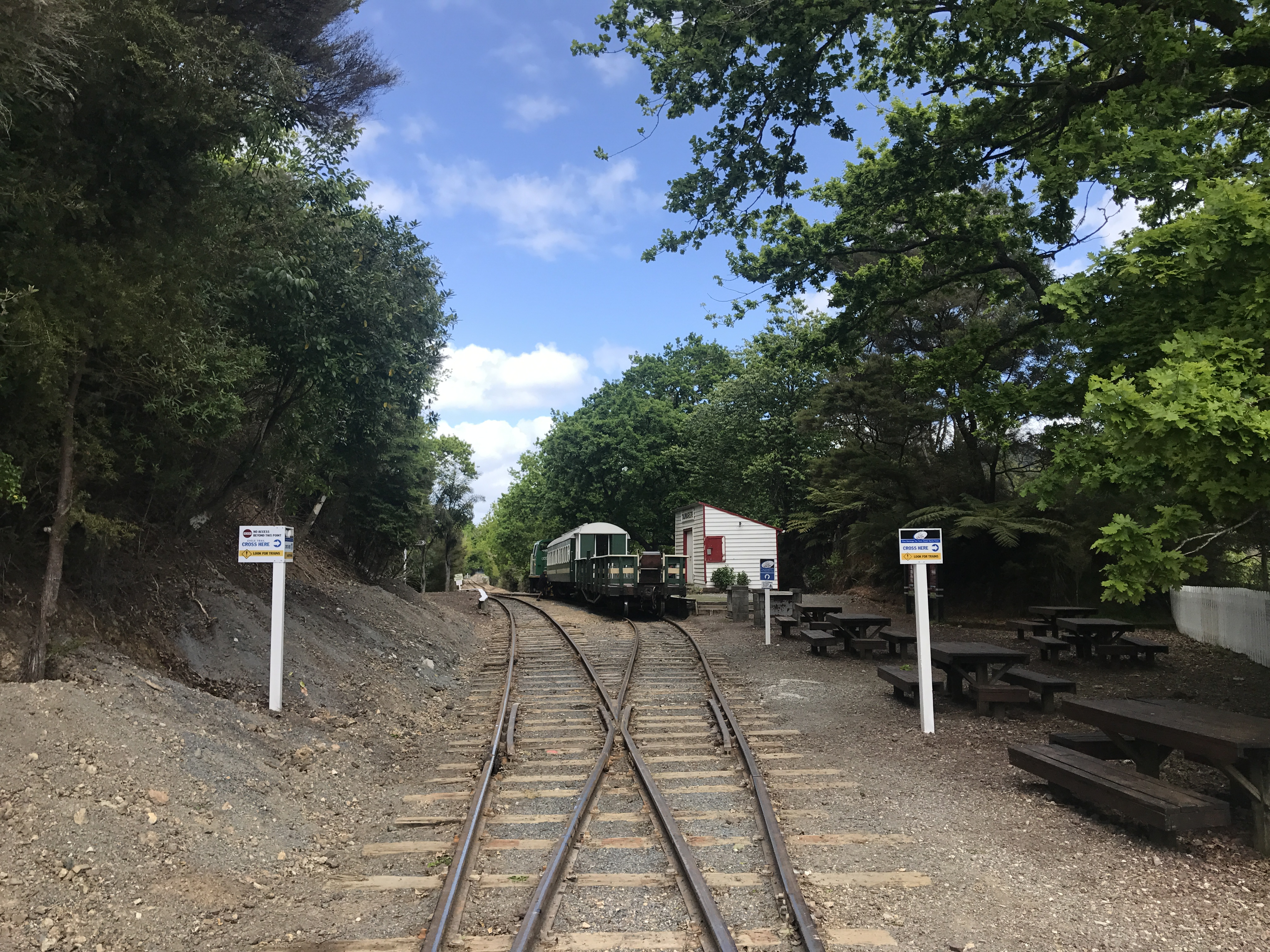
A train at Taumarere railway station in 2018, when it served as a terminus for the Bay of Islands Vintage Railway.

The first section of what became the North Auckland Line opened as a private industrial line on 2 March 1868 between Kawakawa and a wharf at Taumarere. It was constructed not as a railway, but as a wooden-railed bush tramway to carry coal to the wharf for export, and was built to the international standard gauge of 4 ft 8 1/2 in (1,435 mm). The standard New Zealand track gauge, adopted a few years later, is 3 ft 6 in (1,067 mm) narrow gauge, but when the Kawakawa-Taumarere tramway was converted into a metal railway in 1870, it retained its gauge of 4 ft 8 1/2 in. In 1875, the government purchased the line and converted it to 3 ft 6 in gauge two years later.

=== Kaipara–Riverhead ===
The second portion of what became the North Auckland Line was built as a temporary measure. Timber interests around the Kaipara Harbour had poor access to markets in Auckland, so a line was built overland from the Kaipara to a wharf in Riverhead for transhipment. The Auckland Provincial Council began construction on 31 August 1871, but work was taken over by central government on 1 January 1872. Due to delays with acquiring rails, construction was delayed and the line did not open until 29 October 1875. The section from the shores of the Kaipara at Helensville South station to Kumeū later became part of the North Auckland Line, while the section to Riverhead became a branch line. This brief line cut transport costs and time in comparison to a bullock team or lengthy coastal shipping.

=== Whangārei–Kamo ===
The discovery of coal in the Kamo area created a need for transportation from the mines to export wharves. The first mine opened in December 1864, and as the 1870s progressed, mining activity increased and so did pressure for a railway. In 1877, the government approved a tramway, but a preliminary survey the next year found a tramway would be inadequate; accordingly, a railway was approved from Kamo to Whangārei. Construction began on 10 March 1879 but quickly fell behind schedule due to unstable terrain and slips. On 28 October 1880, the first 7.3 km of line opened, but this featured a temporary 1 km siding to an alternative wharf while the full line was completed to the intended wharf. At 10.64 km, the full line opened on 30 November 1882. The line in Whangārei was raised, the station moved and level crossings eliminated in 1925–26, when it was linked to the Helensville section.

=== Auckland–Helensville ===
The earliest Auckland portion, between Newmarket and Westfield, was actually built as part of the Onehunga Branch in 1873 and was only classified as part of the North Auckland Line at a later date. The first section of a line northwards from Auckland was not officially begun until later that decade, and work took place concurrently with the Whangarei–Kamo section. The first portion, from Newmarket to Glen Eden, opened without ceremony on 29 March 1880. On 21 December 1880, it was opened to Henderson, and on 13 July 1881, it was opened to Helensville. The extension to Helensville connected to the Kaipara–Riverhead section; its northern terminus was extended from Helensville south to a more central Helensville station, and the portion from Kumeu to Riverhead was made redundant as it was quicker to convey goods by train directly to Auckland than transshipping them to ships at Riverhead. Accordingly, Kumeu–Riverhead was closed on 18 July 1881.

=== Taumarere–Opua ===
By the mid-1870s, the inadequacy of the Taumarere wharf was becoming apparent. In 1876 plans were drawn up for a deepwater wharf and an associated township named "Newport", later Opua. A railway was surveyed to link Kawakawa to Opua, and was opened on 7 April 1884. It left the original line not far from the Taumarere wharf, relegating the short section from junction to Taumarere wharf to the status of a spur. Both spur and wharf were made redundant by the new extension and closed the day of the opening to Opua.

=== Kamo–Kawakawa ===
In the latter half of the 1880s, impetus developed to link Kamo and Kawakawa. Surveys had already been undertaken in 1879 and 1883 for a line, but both times, government disapproval blocked construction. Ultimately, a dispute about the fate of the Puhipuhi forest brought about the extension. Logging interests wished to chop down the forest, but lacked viable transportation to Whangarei so the timber could be exported; others wished to burn the forest so the land could be used for agriculture. In 1888, fires were started deliberately in the forest and it became obvious that considerable timber wealth would be lost if a railway were not built soon. The local member of parliament announced the construction of a tramway on 7 August 1889, but both that year and next, the Public Works Department (PWD) rebuffed him.

In 1891, Whangarei interests established a syndicate to extend the line under the Railways Construction and Land Act of 1881, and their detailed offer prompted the newly elected government. The Railway Authorisation and Management Act of 1891 approved the extension by transferring funds from a plan to duplicate the line from central Auckland to Penrose.

Initially, the syndicate was disappointed with the government's progress, as work did not commence until March 1892 due to a shortage of labour. However, by 2 July 1894, the line was opened to Waro. Locals believed this was the first part of the link to Kawakawa, but Richard Seddon had not authorised the full project, just the extension to the Puhipuhi forest. This was originally meant to terminate in Whakapara, but a further extension to Waiotu was required to provide easier access and this opened on 28 December 1898. A further extension to Hūkerenui was requested, but it was delayed due to the failure of the Railway Authorisation Act of 1898 to pass parliament. Considerable political pressure was applied to close the gap between the Kawakawa and Whangārei sections as the road in between was poor and muddy, and the Railway Authorisation Act of 1899 accordingly authorised Waiotu – Hūkerenui along with 8 km of line south from Kawakawa. The succeeding year's Act allowed for the construction of the remaining 24 km to complete the line via Otiria.

On 1 March 1901, the line was opened to Hūkerenui, and by 1904, the PWD was able to run trains south of Kawakawa for 12.8 km. However, a lack of detailed surveys, poor finances, unstable terrain, and the PWD being overburdened with jobs contributed to a slow rate of progress. In May 1910, the 7 km section from Hūkerenui to Towai was opened, and the full section was finally completed the next year. It was handed over from the PWD to the New Zealand Railways Department on 13 April 1911, thus linking Whangarei to the Bay of Islands. Construction had cost nearly a million dollars.

=== Helensville–Whangārei ===
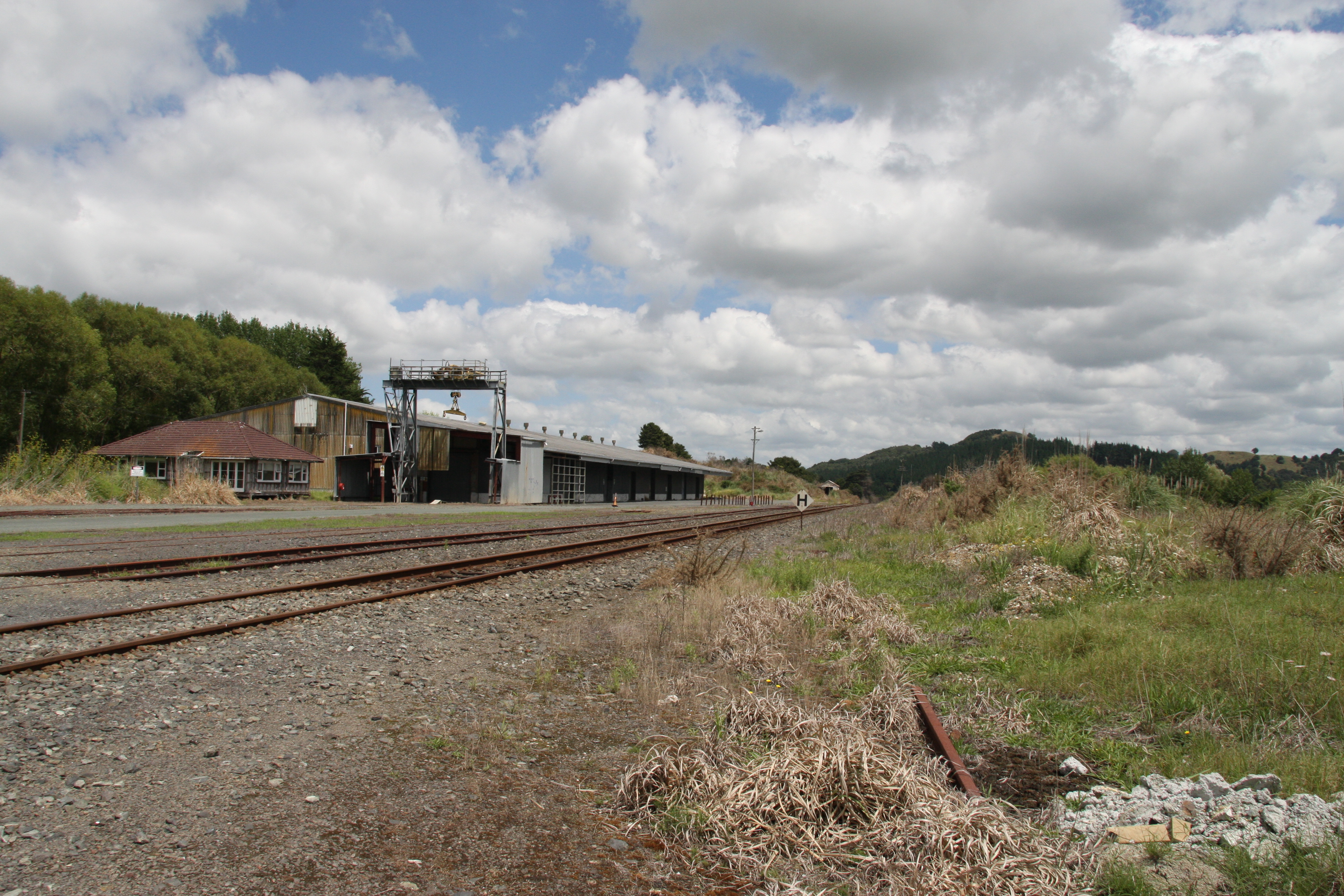
The North Auckland Line passing the site of Maungaturoto railway station, 2011.

With the completion of the line from Whangārei to Opua, the final remaining section of the North Auckland Line was the gap between Helensville and Whangārei. The first work on bridging this large gap occurred in the 1880s when an extension from Helensville to Kanohi opened on 3 May 1889. Beyond this point, construction proved extremely difficult and slow due to the soft clay of the terrain. The 4.5 km between Kanohi and Makarau did not open until 12 June 1897, followed by another 5 km to Tahekeroa on 17 December 1900, though the Minister of Works caught a train to Tahekeroa a few weeks earlier. The line then progressively opened in stages over the next ten years, reaching Wellsford on 1 April 1909 and Te Hana on 16 May 1910. The former became the site of a small locomotive depot, while the latter was established as the northernmost terminus for passengers until the full line was finished.

After 1908, the completion of the North Island Main Trunk railway meant workers could be transferred north and this improved the rate of construction for a few years. In 1914, the longest bridge on the line, the Otamatea Bridge, was completed with a length of 313 m. The outbreak of World War I then slowed construction. On 13 March 1913, the line had been opened to Kaiwaka, but the next section through Maungaturoto to Huarau, including the Otamatea Bridge, was not formally opened until 1 March 1920. Shortly afterwards, on 3 April 1920, the line being constructed south from Whangārei had opened to Portland. Work thus proceeded from both ends to link Huarau and Portland via Waiotira, though this was not without dispute as local interests clamoured for alternate routes. There were debates over whether the line was to be a mainline to Whangārei or to Kaitaia and the Far North, and when the line north of the Otamatea Bridge was initially authorised, it was envisaged to run via Waiotira and Kirikopuni as part of a mainline to the Far North, with a branch from Waiotira to Whangārei. Government authorisation was first given for the "branch" from Waiotira to Whangārei, while the "mainline" via Kirikopuni was formally authorised in 1919 but never built and the branch to Whangārei became the main line. The PWD was able to offer a freight service between Huarau and Portland from 1923, but some parts of the line were only temporary due to difficulties with the terrain. The line was formally handed over to the Railways Department on 29 November 1925, completing the North Auckland Line. Stationmasters were then employed at Paparoa and Waiotira.

== Deviations and upgrades ==
From the 1920s, overbridges replaced some level crossings on the Western Line, with allowance made for a second track (likewise with new embankments and cuttings): Sandringham Road crossing (formerly New Mount Eden or Edendale Road) in 1924 then Titirangi Road. The new Labour government from 1936 initiated a programme of curve and grade easements between Avondale and Waitakere, removing grades of up to 1 in 33 and curves of 7 to 8 chains (141 to 161m) radius. A new embankment over Oakley Creek was erected in 1949–50 and Bridge No 9 was replaced by a culvert in 1954.

In the early 1960s, the section from New North Road (just north of the Morningside Rail Overbridge, No 38) and over the new Oakley Creek embankment to just north of Avondale Station was double-tracked; completed in 1966. Further double-tracking occurred between 2005 and 2010 as part of the Western Line commuter service upgrade. Signalling upgrades were completed by 1972, with CTC signalling replacing tablet working from Newmarket to Waitakere.

The Makarau (No 2) Tunnel (573 m) north of Helensville was enlarged in 1968 to allow the passage of DA class diesel locomotives and ISO size shipping containers on standard wagons so that both could travel the full length of the North Island. The floor of the tunnel was excavated to a new level, and then the rails, sleepers and ballast were relaid; the work commenced in February 1968 and was completed in November.

The Swanson (Waitakere) Deviation between Swanson Station and the Waitakere (No 1) Tunnel was opened on 3 October 1981 and increased the maximum load able to be hauled by a DA class locomotive from Mount Eden to Helensville from 400 tons to 600 tons. The former grade of 1 in 36 became 1 in 60 as the line no longer dropped down to the Swanson Stream bridge (replaced by a culvert) before climbing up to the tunnel. Several sharp curves were eliminated and an overbridge replaced a level crossing on Scenic Drive. At 2 km the deviation is slightly longer than the original route north of Swanson.

== Operation ==
=== Long distance passenger services ===
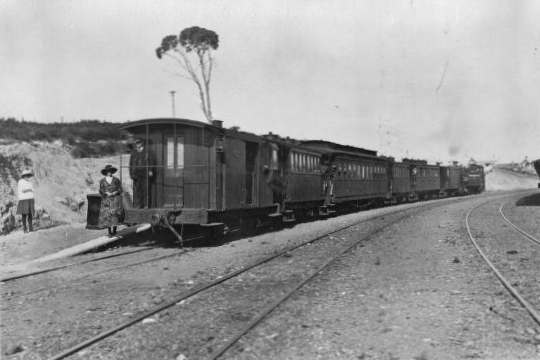
A passenger train stopped in Portland, on the North Auckland Line in 1923.

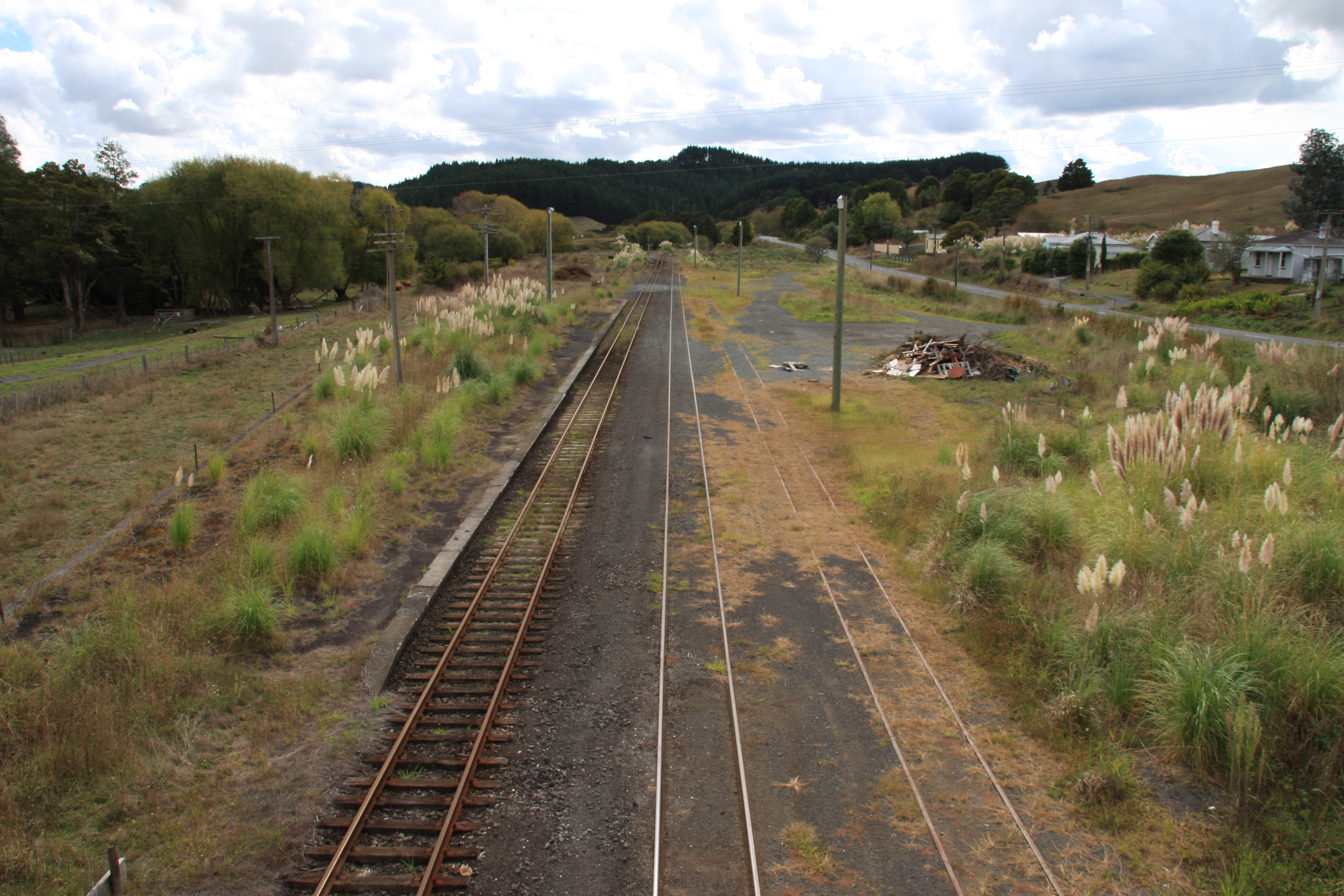
View of the former Waiotira railway station in 2010. This was once an important intermediate station with substantial facilities and an island platform with tracks on the left as well as the right. Passengers transferred here between the Northland Express/railcars and mixed trains to Dargaville.

In the early days of the line, services were very localised and catered to local rather than national needs. When the line was completed, a through passenger express was established between Auckland and Opua. This was known as the Northland Express, and by the 1950s, it ran thrice weekly and took five hours and twenty minutes to run from Auckland to Whangārei. However, due to the twisting nature of the line, passenger services were slow and they struggled to compete with private cars.

In November 1956, the Northland Express carriage train was replaced by a railcar service utilising 88 seater (also known as Fiat) railcars. These popular services barely lasted longer than a decade, being withdrawn in July 1967 as the railcars proved mechanically unreliable. The Auckland Harbour Bridge had opened in 1959 and drastically cut road transport times north, and in the face of heightened competition, the railway could not compete. No dedicated passenger service replaced the railcars. Passenger carriages were now attached to some freight trains to create mixed services that ran between Whangārei and Auckland and from Whangārei to Ōkaihau and Opua; as they adhered to the freight schedules, the mixed trains ran much slower than the previous dedicated passenger services. This slow pace made them unpopular and the last mixed trains ran in 1976. Since this time, no passenger trains have run beyond the northern extremity of Auckland's suburban network with the exception of excursion trains a few times per year and a brief commuter train trial in 2008–09 as far as Helensville.

=== Auckland commuter services ===
Commuter services between central Auckland and its western suburbs have been a mainstay of the North Auckland Line from its construction. Services between central Auckland and Swanson run on the Western Line; Waitakere, to the northwest of Swanson, was the terminus until July 2015, when diesel trains were replaced with electric and the Waitakere–Swanson section of track was not electrified. A bus shuttle service now runs between Swanson and Waitakere. Beyond Waitakere, services between Auckland and Helensville resumed in July 2008 on a trial basis, with a minimum of forty passengers daily required for the train to be permanently reinstated, but these services ceased on Christmas Eve 2009 due to that level of patronage not being met. If the Marsden Point Branch from Oakleigh is constructed, commuter services may also operate between Ruakaka and Whangārei. These would utilise the North Auckland Line between Whangārei and Oakleigh before running down the branch to Ruakaka.

=== Freight services ===
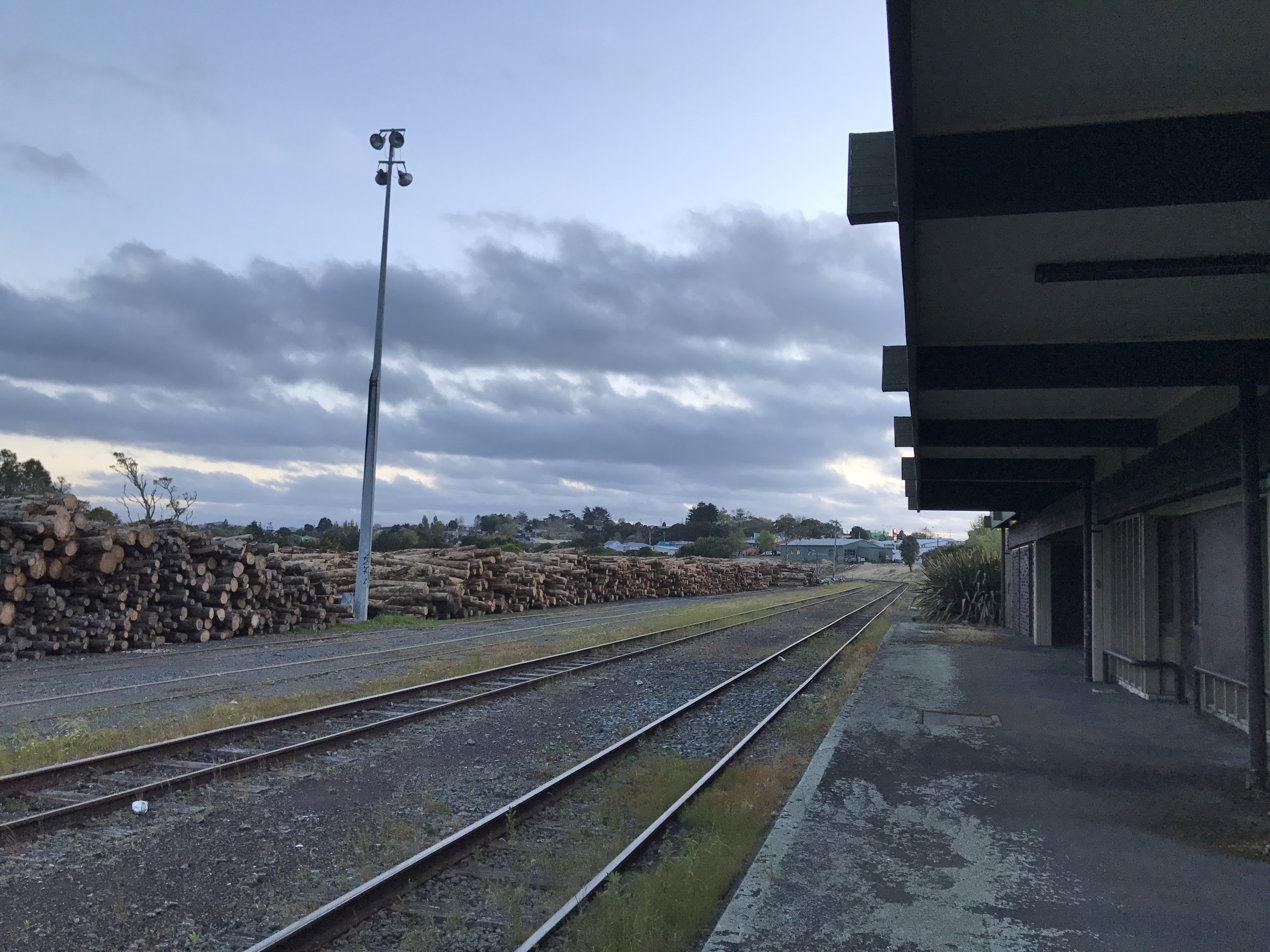
Wellsford railway station on the North Auckland Line in 2018, with logs to be loaded onto a train.

Freight carriage in the North tended to suffer from thin settlement and heavy competition from New Zealand's coastal shipping. In one 1910 example, a fruit grower found it cheaper to ship canned fruit to Auckland by boat via Christchurch, rather than pay rail rates.

Freight service has typically been operated as two semi-independent sections; services between Auckland and Whangārei, and services north of Whangārei. Freight services currently operate twice every weekday each way between Auckland and Whangārei, with localised services shunting the line north of Whangārei – one service formerly operated all the way to Otiria and two terminate in Kauri with a third if required.

Traditional port traffic through Whangārei and Opua fell away in the 1960s with the decline of coastal shipping. By 1984, there were no regular trains past Kawakawa and in 1985 the Opua Branch was sold to Bay of Islands Scenic Railway. Tracks were lifted on the Ōkaihau Branch in 1987 and between Kawakawa and Moerewa in 1993. The Dargaville Branch continued to carry coal and dairy produce for the Northern Wairoa Co-operative Dairy Co, until slips and closure of the dairy factory in 1998. It reopened in 2000 for logs but closed again in 2014 due to track damage.

In 2016, KiwiRail announced that services north of Kauri were to end in September, and Kauri is now the "new" end of the North Auckland line. The Fonterra dairy factory at Kauri makes that location on the line an important shipping point. Furthermore, south of Whangarei, a shunt operates each weekday to Portland, and a second if required to Wellsford; no freight trains at all operate on weekends.

By 2019, only one weekday return freight service operated on the line, largely carrying dairy and timber products. Between 2010 and 2019 there were over 70 line outages, including derailments closing the line for over a week. Another derailment closed the line in March 2021.

==== Rejuvenation ====
In 2007, an upgrade of the North Auckland Line was described by Northland Regional Council chairman Mark Farnsworth as an important stage in the construction of the Marsden Point Branch. The upgrade would increase tunnel clearances to enable large freight containers to be conveyed between Marsden Point and Auckland. KiwiRail had the line under review as part of their turnaround plan, and in 2011 KiwiRail asked the Northland Regional Council to pay for new wagons on the line. In 2014, KiwiRail decided not to upgrade the line to meet national standards of clearances and wagon axle-loads due to a lack of finance. Operating speed was restricted to 50kph and maximum axle-load was 16 tonnes.

In April 2016, KiwiRail said that it would cost $240 million to bring the Waitakere to Whangārei section up to the standard of the Hamilton to Tauranga section, plus $150 million for signalling upgrading; and with $500 million for electrification the total cost would be $700 million to a billion dollars. In April 2017 KiwiRail reiterated the $240 million upgrade cost; and in June 2017 KiwiRail advised that 9 tunnels on the line (Nos 2,3,4,5,7,8,10,11 & 13) would require alteration at a cost of $50 to $60 million to accept the larger "Hi-Cube" containers.

In October 2017, the new Labour–NZ First coalition government announced that it would spend $500 to $600 million on rehabilitating the line, and building the long proposed extension (branch) to Northport at Marsden Point at a cost of $200 million; the total works to cost $800 million. Shifting the Port of Auckland freight business to Northport would be investigated, but the agreement with New Zealand First does not commit the government to a move to Northport or elsewhere. In June 2018 it was announced that $500,000 would be spent investigating line upgrades north of Auckland.

A business case for the upgrades was prepared by New Zealand Ministry of Transport and published in May 2019. The business case found the total cost of the upgrade and new branch line to Marsden Point would be NZ$1.3 billion, with a benefit-cost ratio of 1.19 (assuming NorthPort's expansion goes ahead), meaning for every $1.00 spent there would be a return of $1.19. The poor state of the line would require significant investment in the next five years. The report said that speed restrictions and length made the line impractical for commuter passenger travel and some types of freight. It noted that Whangārei to Westfield is about 215 km (134 mi), some 30 km (19 mi) longer than the road, and that due to speed restrictions (proposed to be raised from a maximum of 50 km/h (31 mph) to 70 km/h (43 mph)) travel time was around 7 hours, rather than 4.5 with previous restrictions, or 3 by road.

In the May 2019 Budget, it was announced that a $300 million funding allocation for the NAL would cover the following work; replace 85,000 sleepers, lower 13 tunnels, rebuilt 7 bridges, reopen Kauri to Otiria section and Otiria container terminal. In 2021 it was decided the line between Whangārei and Otiria would be further upgraded to take 18 tonne axle loads, beginning in 2022.

On 6 September 2019, the Regional Development Minister Shane Jones announced at Helensville railway station a grant of $94.8 million for upgrades on the 181 km line, without which it could have been closed within a year according to KiwiRail. The work includes replacing five ageing wooden bridges of the 88 bridges on the line with concrete bridges ($16.2M); repairing 13 tunnels ($7.3M) including steel support ribs in No 2, Makarau and investigating ground conditions for later track lowering; upgrading or replacing about 54 km (30%) of track sleepers and ballast with 50,000 sleepers and 50,000 cubic metres of ballast ($53.1M); clearing drains and replacing about 237 (25%) of the 950 culverts ($9.5M); stabilising nine embankment slopes ($4.7M); vegetation control ($0.8M) and improving Whangarei Rail Yard ($3.2M).

The line was closed from June 2020 to 11 January 2021 for the $110 million project, which allows the line to take high-cube containers; the project involved replacing five bridges and lowering the track in thirteen tunnels. KiwiRail had expected the rejuvenation work to be largely complete by September 2020, cutting 1½ hours off the 2019 schedule, and that trains could be running to Marsden Point by 2023. Some of the delay was due to restrictions during the 2020 COVID lockdown. A business case for building the Marsden Point rail link is under development it estimated to take five years to build once approved

In 2023 Cyclone Gabrielle undermined part of the line and caused a 60,000 m^{3} (78,000 yd^{3}), or 35,000 m^{3} (46,000 yd^{3}), slip onto the line and a minor road, just south of Tahekeroa tunnel, as well as about 50 other slips between Swanson and Whangārei. The line reopened on 26 September 2024

=== Motive power ===
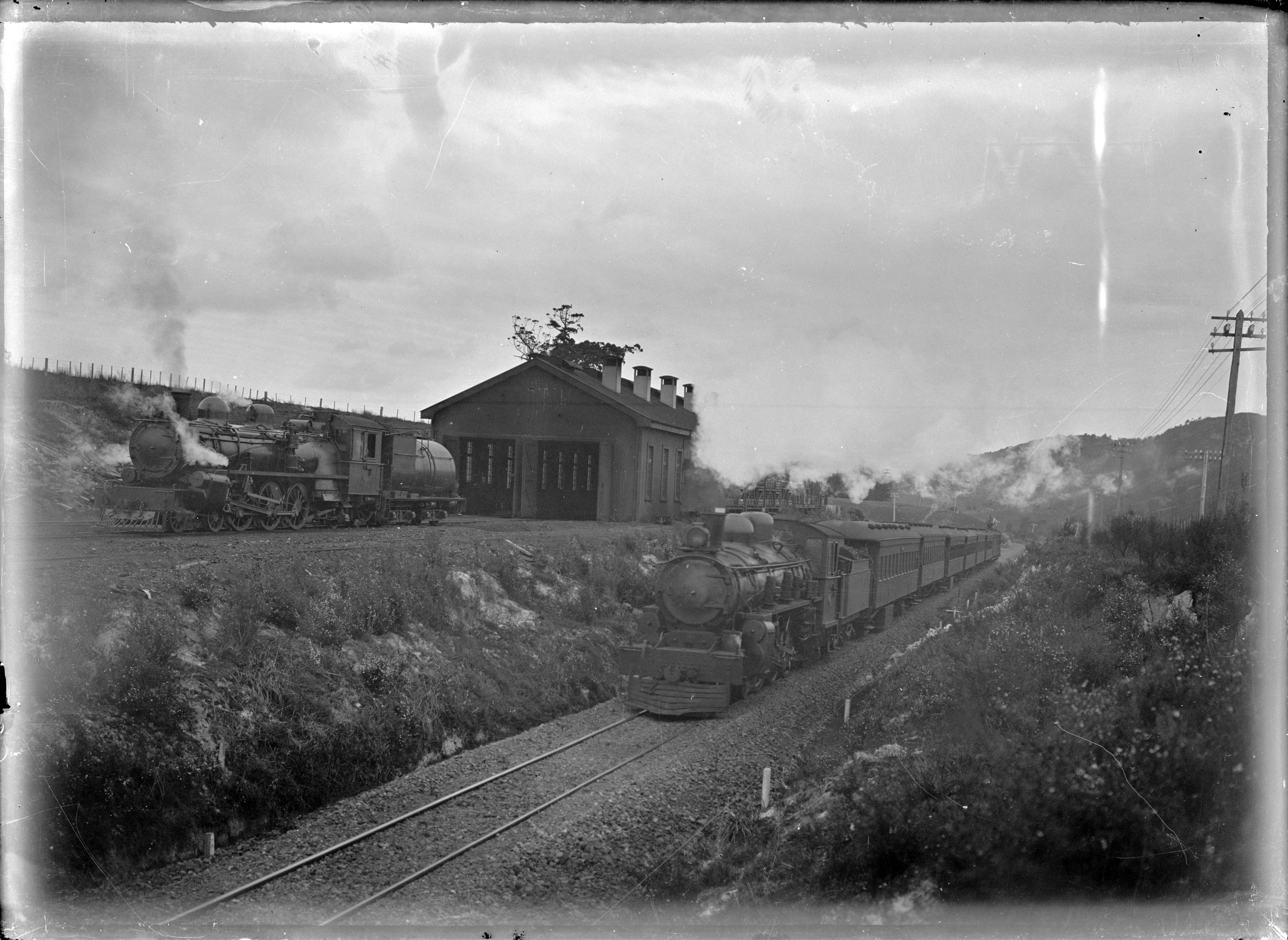
An A class locomotive leads an express train through Maungaturoto towards Auckland in the late 1920s. An A^{B} class locomotive is at left in front of the engine depot.

When the railway around Whangārei was isolated from the national network, it was home to up to half of the members of the W^{B} class. Diesel-electric locomotives have been used since 1966, when D^{B} class and D^{G} class diesel-electric locomotives took over from the A^{B} class steam locomotives and J class steam locomotives that had been working the line for the last couple of decades. In 1968, the Makarau tunnel (573m) north of Helensville was made larger to accommodate the D^{A} class and they were the dominant motive power well into the 1980s. Although the DA class had been withdrawn from many other parts of the New Zealand network, the inability of the DC class to fit through the Makarau tunnel meant the DAs continued to operate until February 1989. By this time, the DF and DX classes were permitted to run to Whangārei, and the DC class could also pass through the Makarau tunnel.

In 2022, KiwiRail undertook tests of the DL class on the North Auckland Line. In October 2022 two DL class locomotives travelled from Westfield in Auckland to the Makarau Tunnel for clearance testing. The locomotives were able to clear the tunnel. In November, DL9642 travelled from Auckland to Whangarei with bridge inspectors, testing bridge piles on the route. The Linesider magazine stated in its December 2022 edition that DL operation on the North Auckland Line is "likely to begin later this year."

== Tunnels ==
There are thirteen tunnels on the line, listed in this table. Many of the tunnels required alteration to accommodate "Hi-Cube" containers (see above under Rejuvenation).

Number	length (m)	Name	Remarks
1	274	Waitakere	
2	573	Makarau	
3	447	Tahekeroa	
4	389	Ahuroa	
5	503	Hoteo	
6	153	Topuni	
7	342	Ross Hill	
8	171	Ranganui	
9	461	Bickerstaffe	
10	343	Huarau	Also known as Haurau.
11	604	Golden Stairs	
12	334	Mareretu	
13	240	Waikiekie	

== See also ==
- Newmarket Line
- Dargaville Branch
- Donnellys Crossing section/branch
- Kumeu–Riverhead section/Riverhead branch
- Marsden Point Branch
- Ōkaihau branch
- Onerahi Branch
- Opua Branch
