= Northport, New Zealand =

Northport
- Trade name: Northport Ltd
- Type: Port
- Founded: August 2, 2000; 26 years ago
- Headquarters: 21 Ralph Trimmer Drive, Marsden Point, New Zealand
- Key people: Jon Moore (CEO); Nick Monsen (CFO); Greg Blomfield (Terminal Facilities Manager); Dave Finchett (Commercial Manager)
- Owner: Marsden Maritime Holdings Ltd (50%); Port of Tauranga Ltd (50%)
- Website: Northport

Northport
- Interactive map of Northport

Location
- Country: New Zealand
- Location: Marsden Point, New Zealand
- Coordinates: 35°49′S 174°29′E

Details
- Opened: 2002; 24 years ago

Map of the port

Northport is a commercial sea port at Marsden Point, at the entrance to the Whangārei Harbour in Northland, New Zealand, located next to the Marsden Point Oil Refinery. It is a naturally deep-water port, with a maximum depth of 14.5 metres. It is the northernmost multi-purpose port in New Zealand, and the closest port to the majority of New Zealand's international markets. It is about 100 km north of the Auckland Northern Motorway, and around 75 nautical miles north of the Port of Auckland.

== History ==
The Northland Harbour Board first proposed a container port at Marsden Point in the 1960s, at which time Whangārei was served by Port Whangārei, in the upper harbour near the city. The Northland Port Corporation was formed in 1988 to take over the commercial port assets of the Northland Harbour Board, and it entered a joint venture with Port of Tauranga Ltd in 2000 to establish Northport Limited. Construction of the port at Marsden Point started in October 2000 and the first berth opened in June 2002, with a second berth to open two months later. Port Whangārei closed to commercial shipping in April 2007 when the remaining cargo operations were transferred to Marsden Point. A third berth opened there in October 2007. Northland Port Corporation changed its name to Marsden Maritime Holdings Limited in August 2014.

== Operations ==
The terminal's multipurpose facility caters for a wide range of cargoes and their associated vessel types, including logs, woodchip, veneer, coal, kiwifruit, cement and fertiliser. In 2015, Northport added a mobile container crane. There is also scope to host cruise ship calls.

Currently operating on 48 hectares with 570 linear metres of birth, there is extensive storage capacity within the port's existing footprint, which is backed by over 180 hectares of port and commercial-zoned land. Northport has the capability to expand to 70 hectares and up to 1,400 linear metres of berth.

In a typical financial year ending June, there are around 271 ship calls and the port handled some 3.4 million revenue tonnes of cargo. The port and ancillary operations support close to 300 employment positions.

Northport's marine service provider, North Tugz, currently handles some of the largest ships entering New Zealand waters, for the Marsden Point Oil Refinery.

Northport Limited is the port operating company of the port facilities. A second crane was added in early 2020, becoming operational in May 2020.

In February 2021, Northport expanded its navigation and crane simulator, with planning options available to other port operators and the New Zealand marine service sector generally.

== Marsden Point Branch ==
In October 2017, the new Labour–New Zealand First coalition government announced that it would spend $600 million on rehabilitating the North Auckland Line and building the Marsden Point Branch, the long-proposed rail extension to Northport, at a cost of $200 million, the total works to cost $800 million; and are to carry out a feasibility study on moving the Ports of Auckland to Northport. Winston Peters and New Zealand First also envisaged that the area around the port could be a tax-free (including duty and GST) Special Economic Area (zone).
