= Lake Kaiwai =

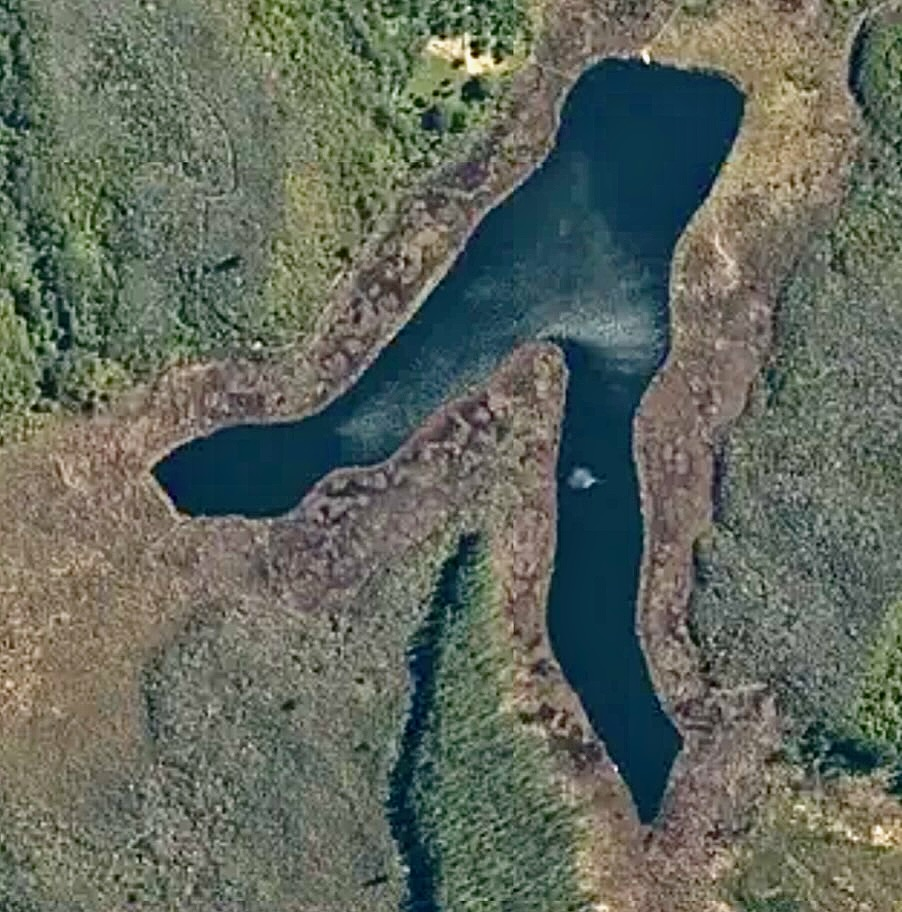
- Lake Kaiwai and surrounding wetland

- Location within Northland Region
- Location: Northland Region, North Island
- Coordinates: 35.4287°S 173.9311°E
- Basin countries: New Zealand

Lake Kaiwai is an alluvial lake in the Northland Region of New Zealand. It is drained by Terewatoa Stream, in the Kawakawa River catchment, and is part of Te Ahu Ahu wetlands.

The threatened bird species kōtātā (fernbird) and spotless crake (pūweto) live in the wetland.

The Kauri Timber Company had a tramway near the lake for hauling out kauri logs to the nearby Okaihau branch railway.

== See also ==
- List of lakes in New Zealand
