= Marsden B =

Oil-fired power station near the Marsden Point Oil Refinery

Marsden B Power Station
- Country: New Zealand
- Location: Marsden Point, Northland
- Coordinates: 35.875474°S 174.468041°E
- Status: Decommissioned
- Construction began: late 1970s
- Commission date: was never commissioned
- Owner: Mercury Energy

Thermal power station
- Primary fuel: Fuel Oil

Power generation
- Nameplate capacity: 238 MW

Marsden B was an unused 250 MW oil-fired power station near the Marsden Point Oil Refinery at Marsden Point, Ruakaka, Northland, New Zealand. Due to rising oil prices, the plant was mothballed in 1978 without ever being commissioned. The Marsden site also includes the Marsden A power station, now a synchronous compensation facility owned and operated by Mercury Energy.

Various schemes were considered for utilising the plant, spanning a range of fuels and technologies. A 2004 proposal to refurbish it for coal-fired use drew environmental protests and created drawn-out legal challenges before this proposal was also eventually abandoned. The plant was dismantled and shipped to India in 2012.

== History ==
Marsden B was built as an oil-fired plant but never commissioned, due to rising oil prices and cheaper alternatives available from natural gas and from the hydroelectric generation of the South Island. It was to be a station associated with Marsden A and was built next to it on the same site.

A program of extended maintenance was undertaken with the major components being "preserved" with anti-rust chemical coatings and regular inspection. This "mothballing" was put into place as an economy measure should demand ever make its use an economical proposition. At various times, some items of auxiliary equipment were removed and relocated to other power stations around the country. The exhaust chimneys for both stations were brought down after partial dismantling of Marsden A.

In 2004, Mighty River Power proposed modification of Marsden B for operation on coal. This revived a 1970s proposal, and would require the construction of a branch line railway, the Marsden Point Branch, to carry in the quantity of coal required. The proposal drew record numbers of submissions mostly in opposition. Greenpeace New Zealand staged an occupation of the site in 2005.

=== Protest timeline ===
The following is a timeline of the events associated with the proposed coal-fired reactivation:

- October 2004: Mighty River Power lodge application with Northland Regional Council for resource consent to refire Marsden B power station on coal.
- February 2005: Greenpeace occupies the roof of Marsden B for 9 days, bringing national attention to the issue. Jointly, with local community groups, Greenpeace asks the Minister for the Environment to "call in" the project, so that the government must make a decision on the project. They refuse. The three activists come down on the day submissions close. A record 4000 submissions are received by the Council, almost all opposing it.
- July - August 2005: Commissioners acting for the Northland Regional Council hear submissions on the proposal. Greenpeace brings experts from Australia and the United States.
- September 2005: Resource consent is granted by the Northland Regional Council to reopen the power station as a coal-fired plant. It is the first major coal-fired power station in New Zealand for over 25 years.
- October 2005: Greenpeace and other community groups lodged an appeal to the Environment Court.
- February 2006: Mighty River Power called for proceedings in the overall appeal to be put on hold while it negotiated access to Department of Conservation (DOC) land.

Mighty River Power submitted to the Environment Court that climate change could not be considered in the overall appeal.

- July 2006: The Environment Court made its decision regarding the relevance of climate change to the overall appeal, saying that climate change is not a relevant consideration that needed to be taken into account when approving Marsden B.
- August 2006: Greenpeace appealed the decision on climate change to the High Court of New Zealand.
- September 2006: DOC issue their interim decision to allow MRP access to DOC land for a coal conveyor for Marsden B.
- October 2006: The High Court overturned the Environment Court decision and said that climate change does need to be considered.
- November 2006: Submissions closed to DOC regarding allowing Mighty River access to DOC land for a coal conveyor belt.

Mighty River Power appealed the High Court decision to the Court of Appeal. Genesis Energy indicated their interest in joining the appeal on Mighty River's side.

- January 2007: The Department of Conservation hearing on 30–31 January 2007, to hear submissions on Mighty River's plans to put a coal conveyor belt across conservation land. Greenpeace, community groups and individuals made submissions at the hearing. Over 1,400 written submissions were received by DOC and almost all opposed the plan.
- March 2007: Mighty River Power abandons its coal plans at Marsden B.

== Sale ==
In 2009, Mighty River Power sold the Marsden B plant for $20 million to an Indian company, United Telecom. Resource consents for dismantling the plant were granted in June 2011, and the 20,000 tonnes of plant and equipment was dismantled later in 2011.

== See also ==
- Electricity sector in New Zealand
