= Oakleigh, New Zealand =

Coordinates: 35°50′S 174°19′E

Oakleigh (Māori: Ngako) is a settlement 23 km (14 mi) south of Whangārei in the Whangarei District of the Northland Region of New Zealand, on the main highway and the North Auckland Line.

The place was named after a grove of several large oak trees there, as the new Post Office built in 1910 required a name. The Post Office originally opened as Mangapai Wharf, but was renamed Oakleigh on 1 February 1913. The Post Office closed on 1 June 1945.

The settlement had a railway station from 1923 to 1975. In 1947, the station was unstaffed but had a small passenger shelter, a 30 foot by 20 foot goods shed, a loading bank, sheep and cattle yards, and room for 97 wagons on two loop sidings. The proposed Marsden Point Branch line to Northport will leave the North Auckland Line at Oakleigh.

== Demographics ==
Oakleigh is part of the Oakleigh-Mangapai statistical area.
