= Minerva (1910 ship) =

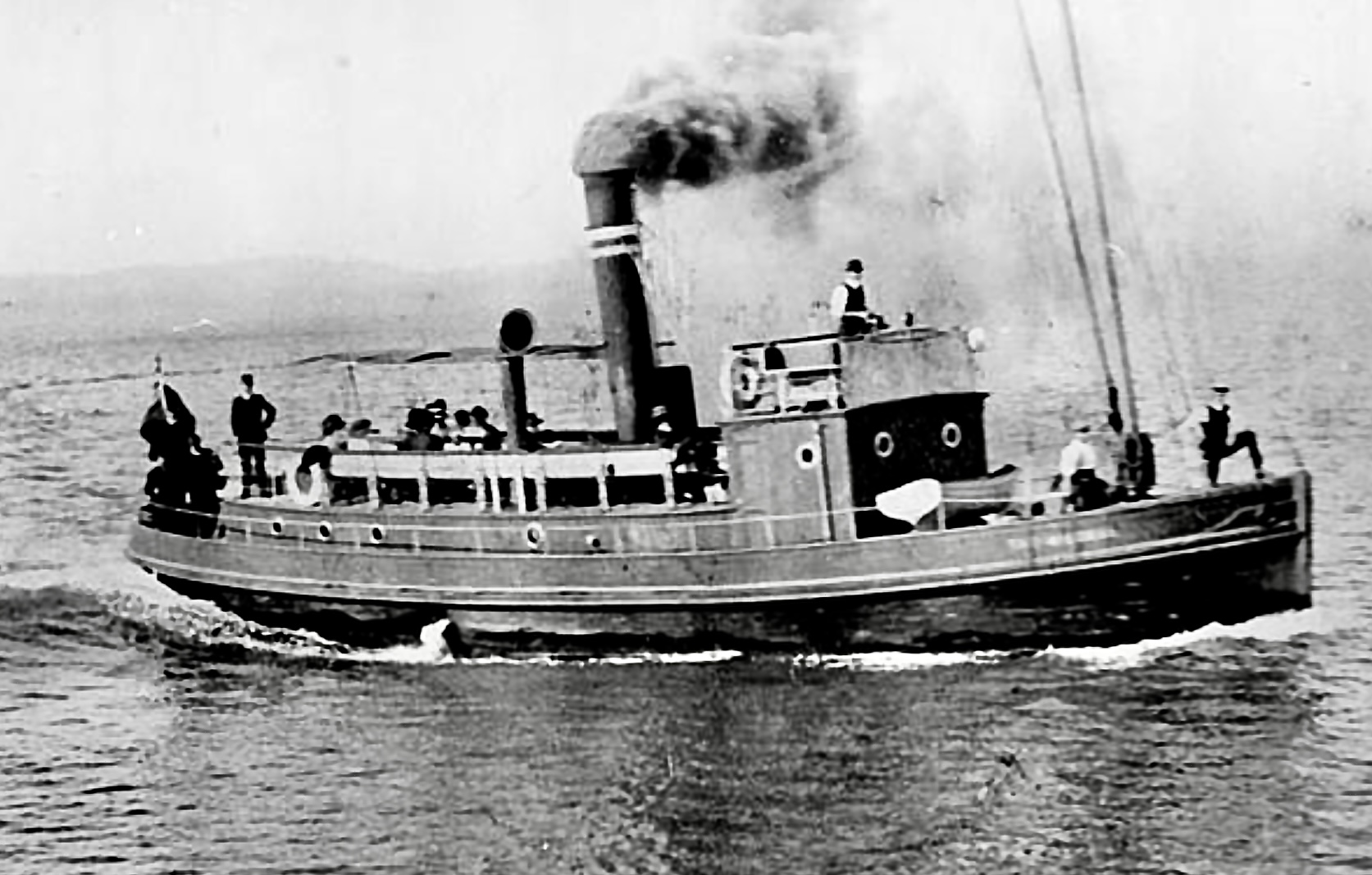
- Minerva about 1911

History
- Owner: Clevedon Steam Navigation Company Limited
- Builder: Charles Bailey junior
- Launched: 10 December 1910
- Status: Undergoing restoration

General characteristics
- Tonnage: 21 tons
- Length: 65 ft (20 m)
- Beam: 15 ft (4.6 m)
- Draught: 3 ft 10 in (1.17 m)
- Installed power: Twin 14 hp (10 kW) steam engines by Fraser & Sons
- Speed: 9 knots (17 km/h; 10 mph)
- Capacity: 176 in river, 117 in extended limits

Minerva is a 21-ton, kauri-built, steam passenger ferry, launched for Clevedon Steam Navigation Company Limited at the Freemans Bay yard of Charles Bailey on 10 December 1910, to link Auckland with Whitford and Howick. A social for the new ship was held at Whitford on 16 January 1911.

When road competition made the service uneconomic, she was put up for sale in 1921. In 1922 she was damaged when a crane fell on her. Later that year she was sold to Charles West, who owned a sawmill at Helensville and used her to tow logs across Kaipara Harbour. She had a stormy passage to Kaipara and initially had to put in to Manukau Harbour. She was again put up for sale in 1944.

She then became a fishing boat, a houseboat (she was on the Hātea River in 1984) and an America's Cup viewing boat, until, in 2010, she was given to the Kerikeri Steam Trust for restoration. In 2019 she was moved by road from Kerikeri to Opua. 1940s Sisson marine compound steam engines were found to power her twin screws, as her twin Fraser & Sons 14 hp (10 kW) engines were removed when she was converted to diesel after her 1944 sale. W Sisson & Co was a Gloucester engineering firm from 1889 to 1958, when it became part of Belliss and Morcom. A 70 hp (52 kW) Sisson engine, from the minesweeper Oceanid, arrived in 2020 from Seattle. Another Sisson engine (8-inch high-pressure, 16-inch low-pressure cylinder, 8-inch stroke) arrived in 2022 from Lake Constance.

Minerva is currently being restored for use in the Bay of Islands. In April 2024, a 6-tonne boiler, made by Lyttelton Engineering, was delivered to Opua. It is planned that she will provide tourist trips between Russell and Opua, connecting with the Bay of Islands Vintage Railway.
