= Mary Tautari =

New Zealand teacher (d. 1906)

Mary Constance Tautari (née Perry, died 2 January 1906) was a Māori schoolteacher, interpreter, and postmaster in New Zealand. She was the founder and head teacher of the Taumārere Native School. The school developed a good reputation as a day school and boarding school, primarily serving Māori girls. Born in Māhia Peninsula, she married the trader Hēmi Tautari. They lived in Taumārere, where they were the primary drivers for the construction of a Māori church.

== Early life and marriage ==
Perry was born in Māhia Peninsula to Harieta Haumu, a Hokianga Māori woman, and Robert Perry, a British officer with George Grey. Her date of birth is not known. She had an English governess and learned French, piano, literature, history, and "all the refinements of the English gentry". She also knew Māori and identified with her mother's people. She married the trader and sea captain Hēmi Tautari in 1861. He owned schooners and transported goods between the Bay of Islands and Auckland.

== Teaching and later life ==
Tautari ran a private school with 30 to 40 students in Kawakawa. In 1875 she opened the Taumārere Native School, a day and boarding school in Taumārere next to the general store owned by her husband. She was the school's head teacher. The school quickly grew to accommodate 20 students, 12 of whom were boarders.

Taumārere Native School was primarily attended by Māori girls between the ages of seven and 14. Some boys also attended the school, which gained a "high reputation" with some students being sent long distances to attend. Pupils at the boarding school learned English, household duties, singing, and instrumental music. They also gave musical recitals at the Taumarere Hall. Despite financial difficulties in 1877, the school continued to operate. When the Pākehā George Grey visited the school in 1876, he praised the assimilation of the students, remarking that the girls were "Europeanised as much as possible, and in all respects rendered fit to become the wives of settlers". Despite Grey's characterisation of Tautari as Europeanised, records identified her as Māori and she lived in a Māori community, married to a Māori man.

Tautari and her husband owned property in Taumārere, where she was employed as a postmaster and an interpreter. They made a claim to a recreation area that was disputed and were the main initiators of raising a Māori church there. In 1872, they hosted a hui in their home to discuss the Puhipuhi gumdigging levy.

In 1883, Tautari's husband died and the boarding school closed by the end of the year. She was given a subsidy to open a children's day school and continued teaching. The school's teaching standards received positive reports from school inspectors. The school had 29 students by 1901.

Tautari attended hearings of the Native Land Court and was a witness before the Rees-Carroll Native Land Laws Commission in 1891. She argued that title determination for land in the Puhipuhi block was influenced by the unfair allocation of advances. She described the Native Land Court system as being unfair, expressing her preference for a rūnanga-based system and saying "I have actually seen people who ought to have the land absolutely lose it." She successfully petitioned the House of Representatives to discharge a mortgage in 1894.

Tautari continued to run the day school until her death on 2 January 1906 in Rawene. The school closed after she died.
