= Marsden Point =

Peninsula in New Zealand

Coordinates: 35.840986°S 174.494734°E

Marsden Point on the east coast of New Zealand

Marsden Point is a broad, flat peninsula that is the southern head of the Whangārei Harbour entrance on the east coast of Northland, New Zealand, 30 kilometres (19 mi) southeast of the city of Whangārei. It is the location of Marsden Point Oil Refinery and the Northport cargo port.

== Geography ==
The point is a broad, flat barrier spit, a peninsula of sand dunes, alluvium and estuarine deposits, that forms the southern head of the Whangārei Harbour entrance. It is 30 kilometres (19 mi) southeast of Whangārei and around 140 kilometres (87 mi) from Auckland's CBD. The flat, developed terrain contrasts starkly with the forest-covered peaks and pinnacles of the mountains across the channel on the northern head, including the 420-metre Mount Manaia. The point is at the northern end of the 22-kilometre long Bream Bay, which has mostly white-sand beaches. Easy access to beaches and recreational fishing grounds, with a climate of warm summers and mild winters, make the area a popular holiday spot and residential location. It is in the Whangarei District and the Northland Region local government areas.

The Greater Marsden Point Area extends from One Tree Point, within Whangārei Harbour, to just south of the Ruakākā township on the open coast, an area of some 2,500 hectares.

== People ==
The tangata whenua Māori people are the Patuharakeke hapu, whose rohe (area) stretches on the seaward side from a point at the north of Mangawhai Heads to the mouth of the Mangapai River, just south of Whangārei.

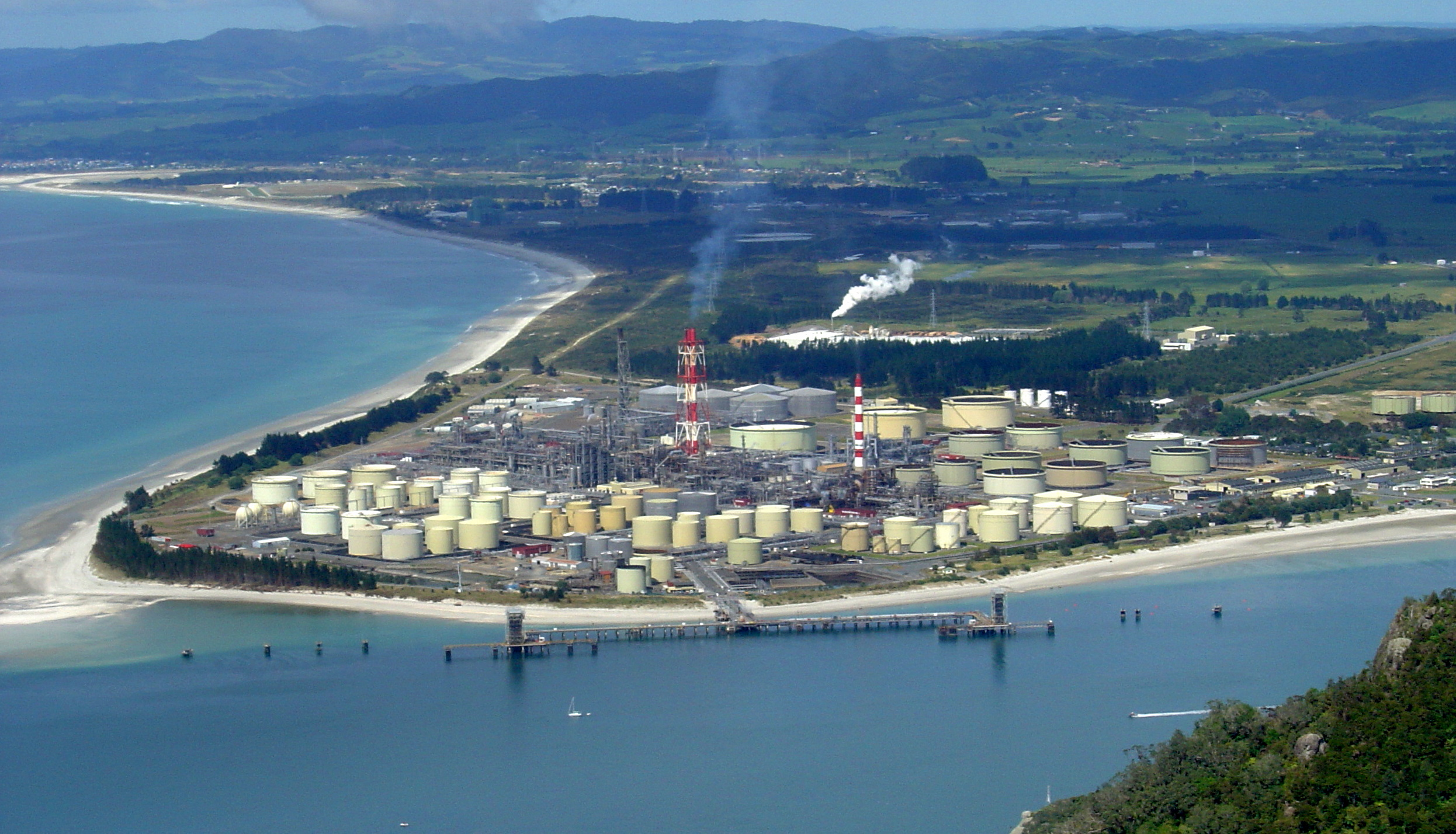
The oil refinery and beyond it the Carter Holt Harvey factory (largely obscured but with a white emission)

Marsden Point is in an SA1 statistical area which covers 8.23 km^{2} (3.18 sq mi) and extends southwest of the point. The SA1 area is part of the larger Bream Bay statistical area.

Historical population
Year	Pop.	±% p.a.
2013	45	—
2018	48	+1.30%
2023	57	+3.50%

The SA1 statistical area had a population of 57 in the 2023 New Zealand census, an increase of 9 people (18.8%) since the 2018 census, and an increase of 12 people (26.7%) since the 2013 census. There were 42 males and 15 females in 12 dwellings. 5.3% of people identified as LGBTIQ+. The median age was 43.8 years (compared with 38.1 years nationally). There were 6 people (10.5%) aged under 15 years, none aged 15 to 29, 42 (73.7%) aged 30 to 64, and 6 (10.5%) aged 65 or older.

People could identify as more than one ethnicity. The results were 57.9% European (Pākehā), 15.8% Māori, 36.8% Asian, and 10.5% other, which includes people giving their ethnicity as "New Zealander". English was spoken by 100.0%, and other languages by 15.8%. The percentage of people born overseas was 47.4, compared with 28.8% nationally.

The sole religious affiliation was 52.6% Christian. People who answered that they had no religion were 36.8%, and 5.3% of people did not answer the census question.

Of those at least 15 years old, 6 (11.8%) people had a bachelor's or higher degree, 15 (29.4%) had a post-high school certificate or diploma, and 27 (52.9%) people exclusively held high school qualifications. The median income was $68,400, compared with $41,500 nationally. 9 people (17.6%) earned over $100,000 compared to 12.1% nationally. The employment status of those at least 15 was that 33 (64.7%) people were employed full-time and 6 (11.8%) were part-time.

== Industry ==
Marsden Point Oil Refinery, the country’s only oil refinery, opened on the tip of the point in 1964, with its jetty in the harbour entrance channel. Northport, the main cargo port for Northland, is further up the channel, beside the refinery, and opened in 2002. A Carter Holt Harvey laminated veneer lumber factory, built in 2001, is just to the south-west of the refinery. The Marsden A and Marsden B oil-fired power stations were built near Ruakākā in the 1960s and 1970s, and dismantled in 2011–2012.

In April 2026, the New Zealand Government confirmed that it would invest over $20 million in recommissioning diesel storage tanks at Marsden Point in response to a global fuel shortage caused by the 2026 Iran war.

A Marsden Point Branch railway is proposed to be built from the North Auckland Line to Northport. In June 2026 KiwiRail announces that it had selected three companies to design a Marsden Point rail spur with a wye at Oakleigh to connect the southern link from Waiotira to Marsden Point. The companies will report back to Rail Minister Winston Peters later in this year for government consideration. The companies are a Downer-HEB joint venture, Spanish infrastructure builder Accionia and Auckland City Rail Link builder Martinus Rail.
