= Taumarere =

- Interactive map of Taumarere
- Coordinates: 35.363°S 174.094°E
- Country: New Zealand
- Region: Northland Region
- District: Far North District
- Ward: Bay of Islands/Whangaroa
- Community: Bay of Islands-Whangaroa
- Subdivision: Kawakawa-Moerewa
- Electorates: Northland; Te Tai Tokerau

Government
  - Territorial Authority: Far North District Council
  - Regional council: Northland Regional Council
  - Mayor of Far North: Moko Tepania
  - Northland MP: Grant McCallum
  - Te Tai Tokerau MP: TBD

Taumarere is a locality in the Bay of Islands in Northland, New Zealand. The Kawakawa River and State Highway 11 run through Taumarere. The town of Kawakawa is 3 km to the southwest. Opua is 7 km to the north and Paihia 14 km.

== History ==
Taumarere was at the head of navigable tidal water on the Kawakawa River and a natural landing place, so a township developed here. It would likely have become the main town in the area, but after coal was discovered at Kawakawa in 1864, a new town developed there, becoming more important than Taumarere.

On 2 March 1868 a bush tramway line opened between Kawakawa and Taumarere wharf at what was known as Derrick Wharf to carry coal for export. It was built to the international 1,435 mm (4 ft 8 1/2 in) standard gauge and motive power was provided by horses that hauled wagons along wooden rails. It was converted into a metal railway in 1870. In 1875, the government purchased the line and converted it to 1,067 mm (3 ft 6 in) gauge two years later. The line was extended to Opua in 1884 and called the Opua Branch. In 1925, it became part of the North Auckland Line. This line has since become a part of the Bay of Islands Vintage Railway, a tourist-oriented heritage railway.

Mary Tautari ran the Taumarere Native School in the locality from 1875 to 1906.

St. Andrew's Church originally stood on the site of the Church Missionary Society's Paihia Mission Station. In 1927 the building was transported by barge and bullock waggon to its present site.

== Demographics ==
The statistical area of Matawaia-Taumarere surrounds but does not include the towns of Kawakawa and Moerewa. Matawaia-Taumarere covers 408.24 km^{2} (157.62 sq mi) and had an estimated population of 1,520 as of June 2025, with a population density of 3.7 people per km^{2}.

Historical population
Year	Pop.	±% p.a.
2006	1,224	—
2013	1,089	−1.66%
2018	1,272	+3.16%
2023	1,473	+2.98%
The 2006 population is for a larger area of 410.68 km^{2} Source:

Matawaia-Taumarere had a population of 1,473 in the 2023 New Zealand census, an increase of 201 people (15.8%) since the 2018 census, and an increase of 384 people (35.3%) since the 2013 census. There were 738 males, 732 females and 3 people of other genders in 468 dwellings. 1.6% of people identified as LGBTIQ+. The median age was 39.9 years (compared with 38.1 years nationally). There were 327 people (22.2%) aged under 15 years, 258 (17.5%) aged 15 to 29, 639 (43.4%) aged 30 to 64, and 249 (16.9%) aged 65 or older.

People could identify as more than one ethnicity. The results were 49.5% European (Pākehā); 66.8% Māori; 5.3% Pasifika; 1.2% Asian; 0.2% Middle Eastern, Latin American and African New Zealanders (MELAA); and 0.8% other, which includes people giving their ethnicity as "New Zealander". English was spoken by 95.3%, Māori language by 27.3%, Samoan by 0.6%, and other languages by 3.3%. No language could be spoken by 2.0% (e.g. too young to talk). New Zealand Sign Language was known by 0.6%. The percentage of people born overseas was 10.4, compared with 28.8% nationally.

Religious affiliations were 30.8% Christian, 5.7% Māori religious beliefs, 0.6% New Age, and 0.4% other religions. People who answered that they had no religion were 56.2%, and 6.5% of people did not answer the census question.

Of those at least 15 years old, 105 (9.2%) people had a bachelor's or higher degree, 681 (59.4%) had a post-high school certificate or diploma, and 318 (27.7%) people exclusively held high school qualifications. The median income was $28,700, compared with $41,500 nationally. 39 people (3.4%) earned over $100,000 compared to 12.1% nationally. The employment status of those at least 15 was that 489 (42.7%) people were employed full-time, 171 (14.9%) were part-time, and 57 (5.0%) were unemployed.
