= Waikare River (Northland) =

Coordinates: 35°20′12″S 174°13′20″E

Location
- Country: New Zealand

Physical characteristics
- Source
  - location: Russell Forest
  - elevation: 340 metres (1,120 ft)
- Mouth
  - location: Waikare Inlet, Bay of Islands
  - elevation: 0 m (0 ft)
- Length: 10 km (6.2 mi)

The Waikare River is a river in the Northland Region of New Zealand's North Island. Rising in the Russell Forest, it flows into the southern end of the Waikare Inlet, a drowned valley which forms a southeastern arm of the Bay of Islands.

== See also ==
- List of rivers of New Zealand
