= Bay of Islands Vintage Railway =

Heritage railway in New Zealand

Coordinates: 35°22′48.63″S 174°3′52.29″E

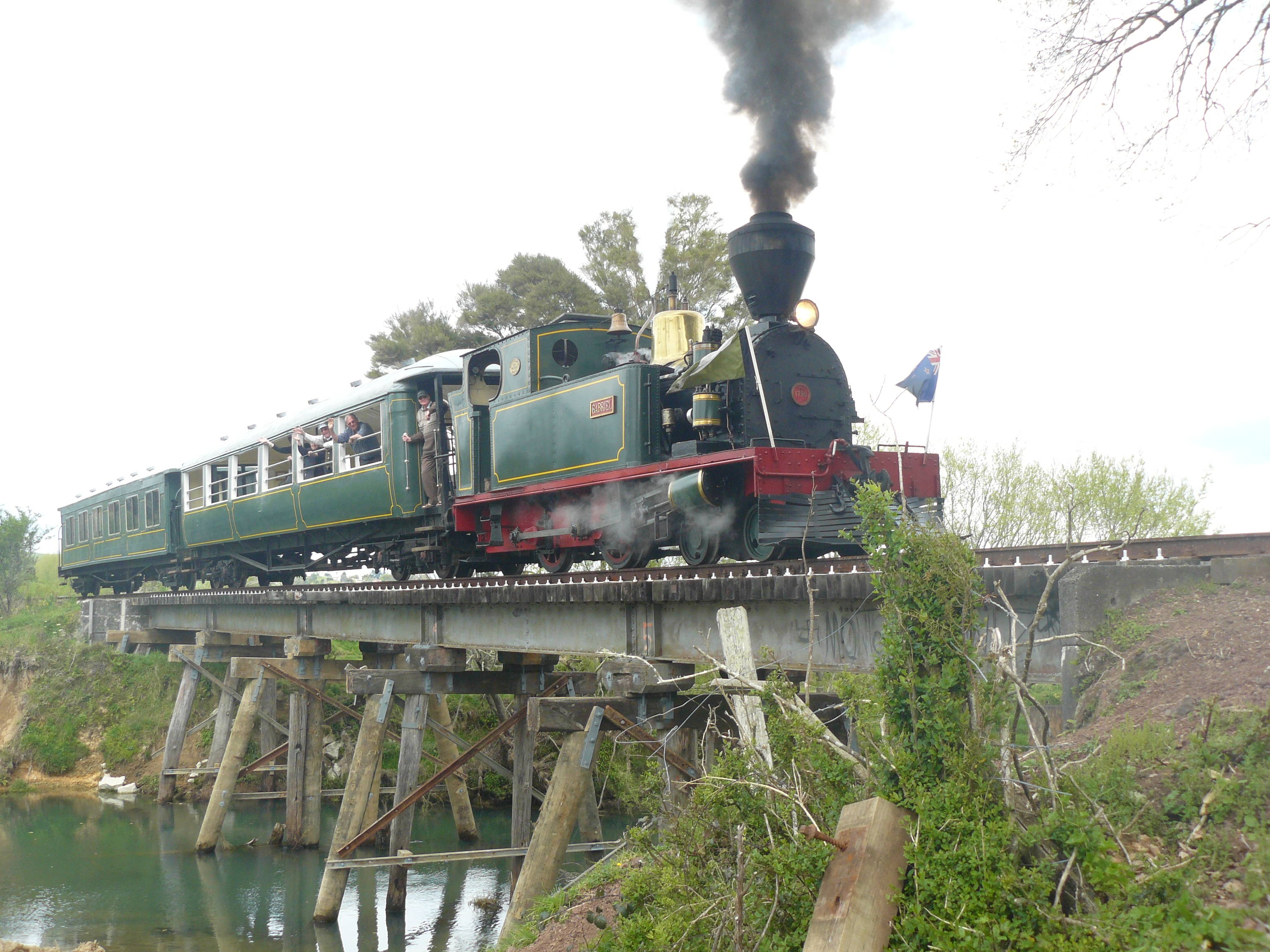
- Steam locomotive Gabriel pulling passenger coaches over Bridge Five
- Locale: Kawakawa, Bay of Islands, Northland, New Zealand
- Terminus: Whangae tunnel

Commercial operations
- Name: Opua Branch
- Built by: Kawakawa Coal Mines (Kawakawa – Taumarere); New Zealand Government Railways (Otiria – Kawakawa, Taumarere – Opua)
- Original gauge: 1,435 mm (4 ft 8 1/2 in) (tramway); 1,067 mm (3 ft 6 in) (railway)

Preserved operations
- Owned by: Bay of Islands Vintage Railway
- Stations: Four
- Length: 11.5 kilometres (7.1 mi) (total length)
- Preserved gauge: 1,067 mm (3 ft 6 in)

Commercial history
- Opened: 1868 (as a tramway)
- Closed: November 1985

The Bay of Islands Vintage Railway Trust (BOIVRT) - Keteriki Ltd is a heritage railway in Kawakawa, in Northland, New Zealand. The railway operates on part of the former Opua Branch railway.

== History ==
The railway was formed as the Bay of Islands Scenic Railway, a private company, in 1985 following the withdrawal of New Zealand Railways Corporation services beyond Otiria. The service began with J 1211, a hired J class locomotive that was brought from Wellington and is now owned by Mainline Steam. The railway proved popular with tourists, and in the summer seasons of 1985–86 and 1986–87, J 1211 was used to haul three return trains a day. The locomotive did not return for the 1987–88 season because of the Ferrymead 125 year celebrations that year and because it used two and a half tons of coal a day, compared to a Peckett locomotive using only one ton a day, which replaced J 1211.

In May 1987, the directors of the Bay of Islands Scenic Railway decided to cease operations due to financial problems. The group was reformed as a preservation society, the Opua-Kawakawa Railway Preservation Society Incorporated. The Taumarere Northland Railway Trust was formed around the same time.

Bay of Islands Vintage Railway Limited, a joint venture between the Society and the Trust, was incorporated in 1995 with the Society owning the locomotives, rolling stock, sheds and miscellaneous equipment and the Trust owning the track and leasing the rail corridor and the Kawakawa station building from New Zealand Rail Limited (later Tranz Rail). The railway continued operations until 2001 when the Land Transport Safety Authority withdrew the line's operating licence.

The rail line between Opua and Lone Cow is currently part of the Twin Coast Cycle Trail with gravel laid over the sleepers and rails.

There is an active campaign to restore the railway, including the rebuilding of the locomotives, refurbishment of passenger carriages, and upgrading the line to safe standards. Currently, operations cover 4.5 kilometres (2.8 mi) of track, including the famous stretch along Kawakawa's main street. The railway was open as far as Taumarere, having passed a safety audit on a bridge before the station, for many years and is now open as far as Lone Cow (Te Akeake). The group is currently raising funds to restore bridge No. 9 on the line and repair the Whangae Tunnel, then on to Opua.

The terminus in Opua is on land now owned by Far North Holdings, the trading arm of Far North District Council, and negotiations are underway for trains to return to Opua.

== Operations ==
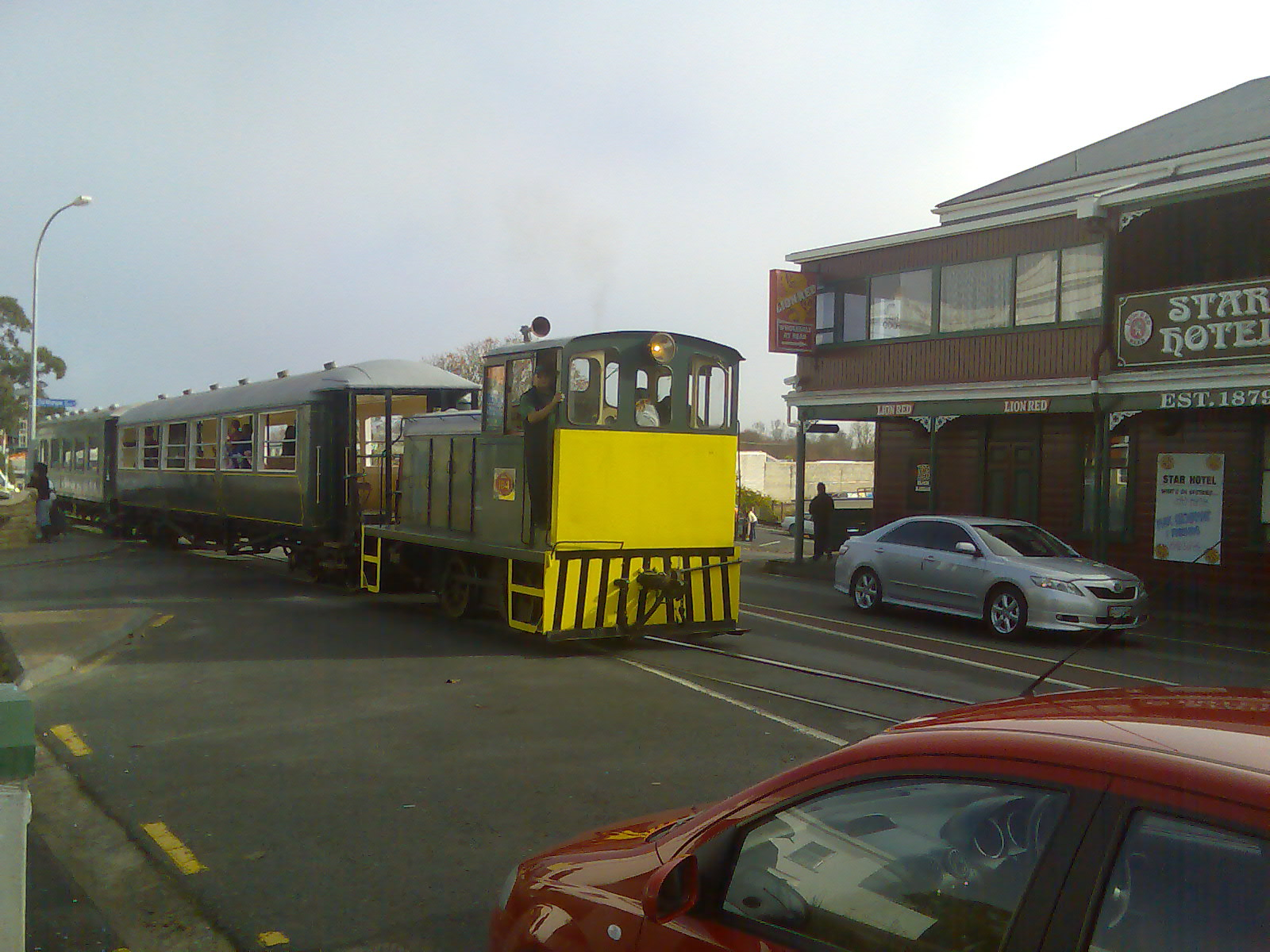
A Bay of Islands Vintage Railway train, hauled by a Price shunting locomotive down the main street of Kawakawa

The Bay of Islands Vintage Railway runs throughout the year. As of May 2010, it runs on Friday, Saturday and Sunday and every day during school and public holidays at 10.45 am, 12 noon, 1.15 pm and 2.30 pm – the round trip takes approximately 45 minutes. Passengers may leave the train at Taumarere and catch a later train back to Kawakawa.

For most of the year, ‘Gabriel the Steam Engine’ is used on Saturdays and Sundays, and ‘Fredrick the Diesel Engine’ is used on Fridays, although this varies depending on public and school holidays and availability of personnel and maintenance. On school holidays ‘Gabriel the Steam Engine’ is used on Fridays, in place of ‘Fredrick the Diesel Engine’, Saturdays, Sundays and Mondays, with ‘Fredrick the Diesel Engine’ being used on Tuesdays, Wednesdays and Thursdays.

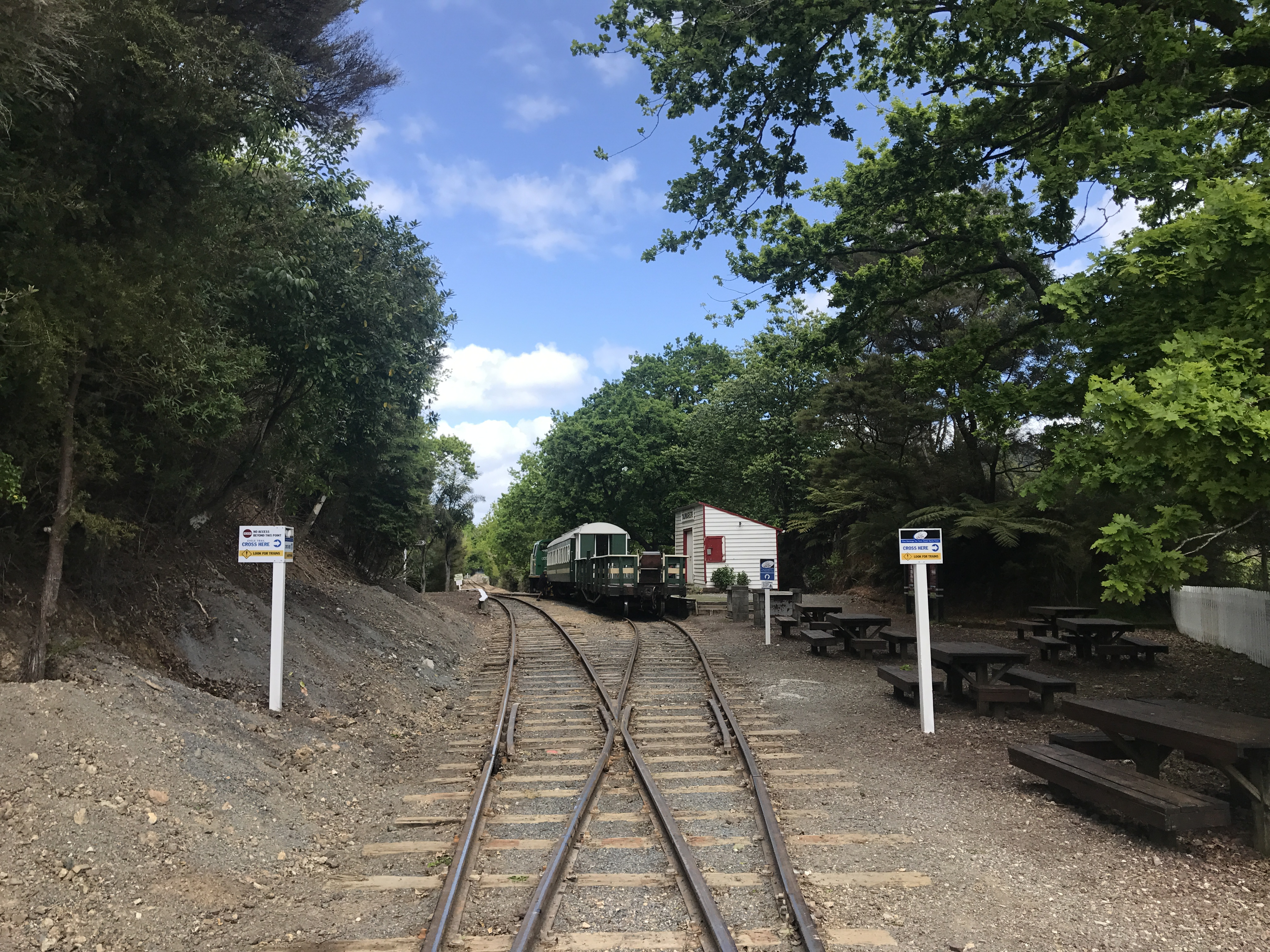
A train at Taumarere railway station

As of 2024, a former Auckland ferry boat, the Minerva is being restored to run a service between Russell and Opua, where it will link with the railway.

== Motive power ==
Class	No.	Type	Name	Built	Builder	Status	Notes
	WPC 6	Steam locomotive	Gabriel	1927	Peckett & Sons	In Service	Has new boiler.
		Steam locomotive	Thomas	1924	Peckett & Sons	Overhaul	
DSA	225 (TMS 305)	Diesel locomotive		1953	Drewry/Vulcan	In service	
DSA	276 (TMS 822)	Diesel locomotive	Kauri	1967	Mitsubishi Heavy Industries	In service	
TR	163 (TMS 661)	Diesel locomotive	Timmy	1959	A & G Price	In service	
F^{A}	9	Diesel locomotive	Sweetie	1897	NZR Addington Workshops	Display	Rebuilt to diesel in 1953.
F^{A}	41	Diesel locomotive		1893	NZR Addington Workshops	Parts supply	Rebuilt to diesel in 1964.
F^{A}	250	Steam locomotive		1892	NZR Addington Workshops	Stored dismantled	
		Diesel locomotive	Ruby	1973	Baguley-Drewry	In service	
		Diesel locomotive	Charlie	1967	Drewry Car Co	In service	
Model 5		Diesel locomotive	Freddie	1958	A & G Price	Stored	Requires new engine.
		Diesel locomotive	Esmae	1949	Drewry Car Co	In service	
		Diesel locomotive	Lennie	1955	Drewry Car Co	Overhaul	

== See also ==
- List of New Zealand railway museums and heritage lines
