= Marsden Point Oil Refinery =

Former oil refinery in New Zealand

Coordinates: 35.840986°S 174.494734°E

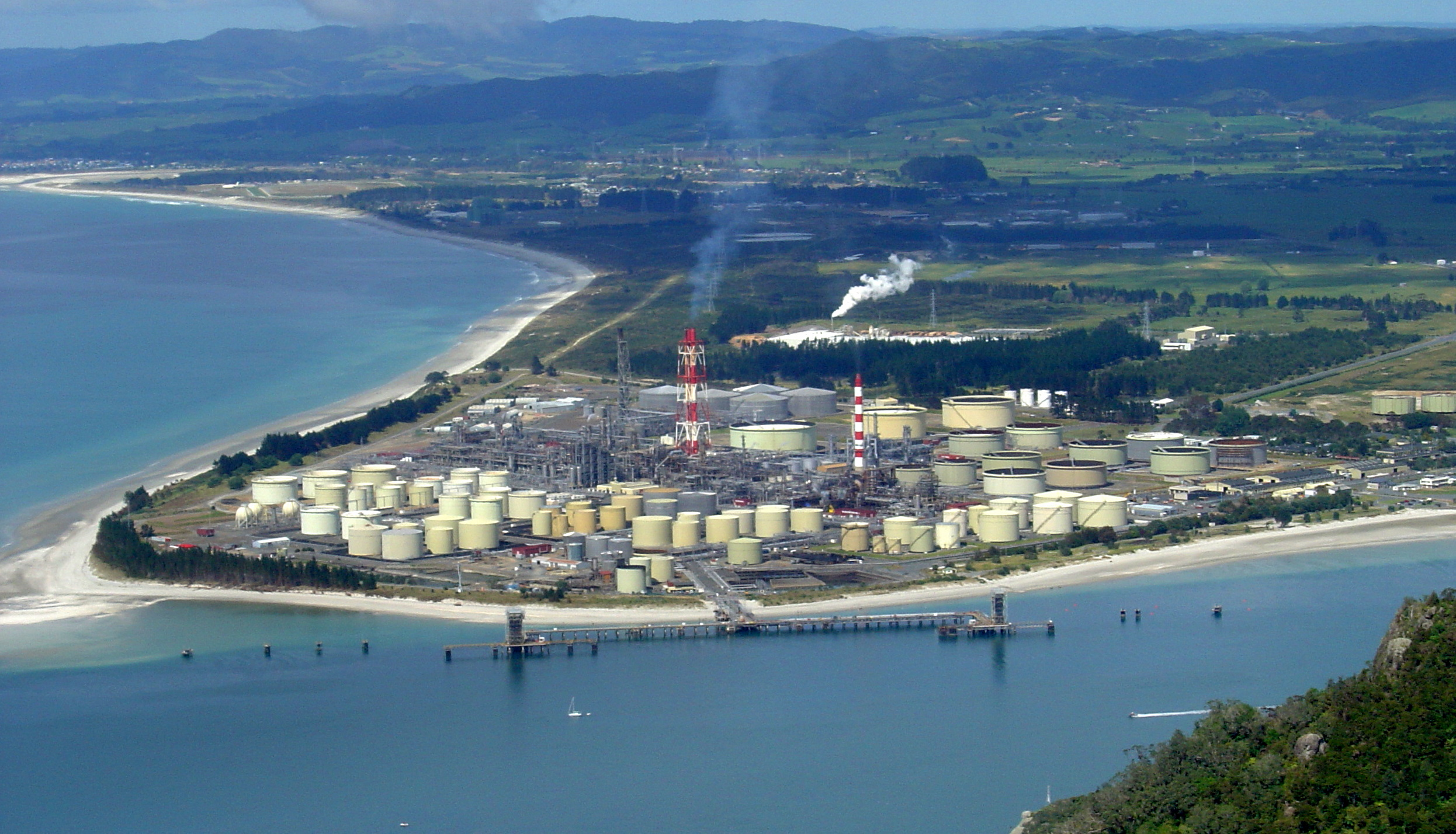
- Marsden Point Oil Refinery, viewed from Mt Manaia on the opposite shore of Whangarei Harbour, 2007
- Interactive map of Marsden Point Oil Refinery
- Location: Whangārei, New Zealand

Refinery details
- Owner: Channel Infrastructure
- Opened: 30 May 1964
- Closed: 2022

Marsden Point Oil Refinery was an oil refinery located at Marsden Point, Whangārei, Northland, New Zealand, which operated from 1964 to 2022. It was the only significant oil refinery in New Zealand, and was owned and operated by the New Zealand Refining Company (later Refining NZ, then Channel Infrastructure), a consortium of oil companies.

By the early 2020s the refinery had become uncompetitive against larger, more efficient overseas refineries, which could supply refined fuel more cheaply than it cost to refine crude oil domestically. In August 2021, Refining NZ's shareholders voted to convert the site into an import-only fuel terminal rather than continue refining, and the refinery was shut down in 2022 and dismantled.

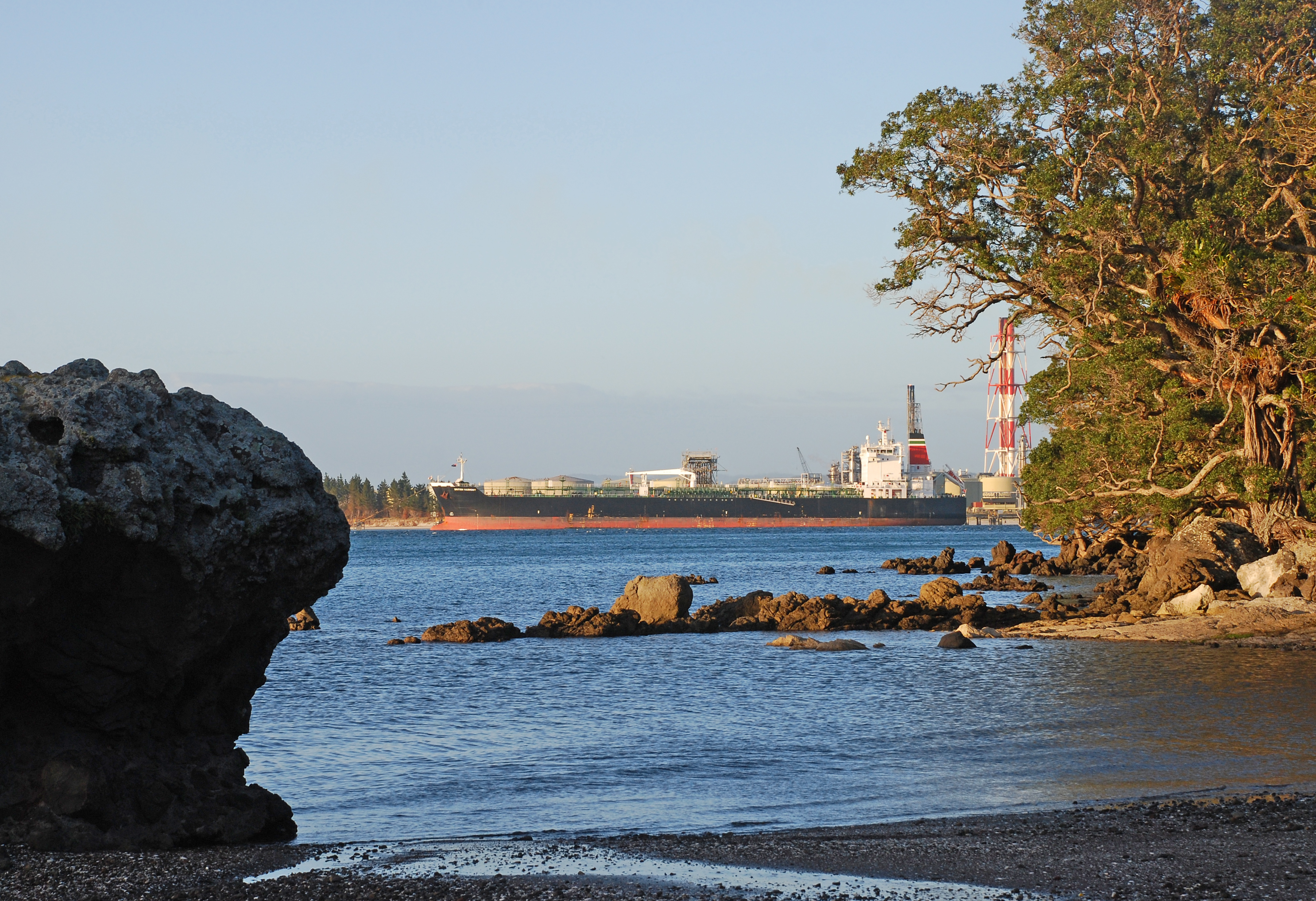
Tanker unloading at Marsden Point refinery, 2007

== History ==
Oil had been refined on a small scale in New Plymouth since the 1930s. Increasing demand for petrol and petroleum related products led the Nash Labour government to begin investigating the possibility of constructing an oil refinery. In May 1959 the government announced that a refinery would be built, at a cost of £20 million, with Shell providing 60% of the capital. The preferred sites were smaller ports, and in July 1959 a Shell team arrived in New Zealand to inspect potential sites, including Nelson, Lyttelton, and several areas near Auckland. Initially the government favoured a site at Matingarahi, on the Firth of Thames, and site tests were carried out in the area in July 1960. Marsden Point was investigated as a backup site, but was ultimately chosen due to its better harbour and growing public opposition to the Auckland option. Land for the refinery was compulsorily appropriated by the Ministry of Works under public works legislation.

Tenders for construction were called in October 1961, and construction of the refinery began in 1962. A consortium of major oil companies, consisting of B.P., Caltex, Shell, Mobil and Europa, contributed the initial NZ£10 million budget of the refinery, and the New Zealand Refining Company was established to operate the facility. The refinery was officially opened on 30 May 1964, with an initial capacity of 52,000 barrels a day.

In 1972, NZRC proposed a major expansion of the refinery, including the addition of a fluid catalytic cracker, which would double its output. While backed by industry minister Brian Talboys, the plans were disrupted by the change of government at the 1972 New Zealand general election. While conditional approval was given in 1976, the expansion was not finally approved until after the 1979 oil crisis, at a cost of NZ$350 million.

=== Think Big ===
The expansion finally began in 1981 as part of the Muldoon government's Think Big policy, financed by a US$500 million Eurodollar loan, to be repaid by a special levy on petrol prices. The new project included a hydrocracker and a 170 kilometres (110 mi) pipeline to transport petroleum products to Wiri, south Auckland. A ground-breaking ceremony was held in March 1981, with major construction beginning in July. A workforce of 1,700 worked on the expansion, with costs escalating to NZ$900 million by the end of 1981, and 1.65 billion in 1983. The cost-escalation meant a second loan of US$750 million had to be raised in 1982. The project saw repeated strikes which shut down the refinery, one of which in 1982 almost saw the invocation of the Public Safety Conservation Act, last used in the 1951 New Zealand waterfront dispute. In May 1984 the entire construction workforce was dismissed following repeated strikes. When they refused to return to work, the Muldoon government passed the Whangarei Refinery Expansion Project Disputes Act 1984 under urgency to force them to do so. An inquiry into the strikes and the governments' reactions to them followed. The project was finally completed in May 1986, two years behind schedule and at a final cost of $1.84 billion.

=== Bailout ===
Following the election of the neoliberal Fourth Labour Government in 1984, the government discovered that its predecessor had made a secret commitment to NZRC to financially underwrite the refinery upgrade, making the public liable for its full costs. Plans to take over the refinery's debt were announced in the 1986 budget, but not implemented until the passage of the Petroleum Sector Reform Act 1988 in May 1988. The law also deregulated the petroleum industry, exposing the refinery to outside competition from cheaper imported fuel. To compensate for this, the NZRC was given NZ$85 million over three years, but deregulation still resulted in significant job losses as the refinery adapted to the new competitive environment.

=== Closure ===
In August 2020, Refining NZ announced that it was considering importing refined fuels, and closing the refining operation. In November 2021 they confirmed that the refinery would shut down in April 2022. The last crude oil shipment was offloaded from the tanker Torm Ingeborg on 8 March 2022, and refining ended on 31 March. The refinery was subsequently dismantled. Channel Infrastructure plans to use the site as an energy precinct.

Following the outbreak of the 2026 Iran war in late February 2026, Resources Minister Shane Jones criticised the previous Labour government for not stopping the closure of the Marsden Point Oil Refinery, arguing that it exacerbated the oil shortage caused by the war's disruption. In response, Labour Party leader Chris Hipkins accused Jones of being dishonest and countered that the decision to close Marsden Point's oil refinery was a business decision made by its owners. Deputy Prime Minister and ACT New Zealand leader David Seymour supported Hipkins, stating that shareholders made the decision to close down the refinery "because it was costing more to refine there than elsewhere." Labour's energy spokesperson Megan Woods rejected Jones' criticism and said that New Zealand would still have relied on imports to meet its fuel needs had the refinery remained open since the Taranaki oil wells only produced a small amount of oil. Similar sentiments were echoed by The Spinoff columnist Joel MacManus who argued that the Marsden Point refinery would still have depended on oil imports from the Middle East. In response to the political and media concerns about a fuel shortage, former Marsden Point CEO Rob Buchanan said that Channel Infrastructure had 300 million litres of fuel stored at its Northland site and had the ability to double that storage capacity.

=== Recommissioning of diesel storage tanks ===
In April 2026, associate energy minister Shane Jones confirmed that the New Zealand Government would allocate over $20 million from the Regional Infrastructure Fund to recommissioning diesel storage tanks at Marsden Point's import and storage terminal. This investment would support 90 million litres of fuel storage.

== Production ==
The refinery used a medium-sour blend of crude oil, nearly all of which was imported. Most crude oil produced in New Zealand is light-sweet and is exported to refineries in Australia. Marsden Point produced 70 per cent of New Zealand's refined oil needs, with the rest being imported from Singapore, Australia and South Korea.

Crude oil bought by the refinery was shipped to the deep-water port at Marsden Point for refining into transport fuels for New Zealand.

When operating, the refinery was responsible for supplying:

- around 85% all of the country’s jet fuel
- around 67% of diesel
- around 58% of all petrol
- all fuel oil for ships

== Refinery-Auckland Pipeline ==
The 168-kilometre (104-mile) underground Refinery-Auckland Pipeline (RAP) connects Marsden Point to the Wiri Oil Terminal in Auckland. The pipeline is 25 centimeters (10 inches) in diameter and transports petrol, diesel and jet fuel at up to 400,000 litres (105,669 US gallons) per hour. Supply was halted for pipeline repairs in September 2017 after an excavator damaged the pipeline on a rural property near Ruakaka, leading to jet fuel shortages and flight cancellations at Auckland Airport.

== See also ==
- Marsden B
