= Mairtown =

- Suburb
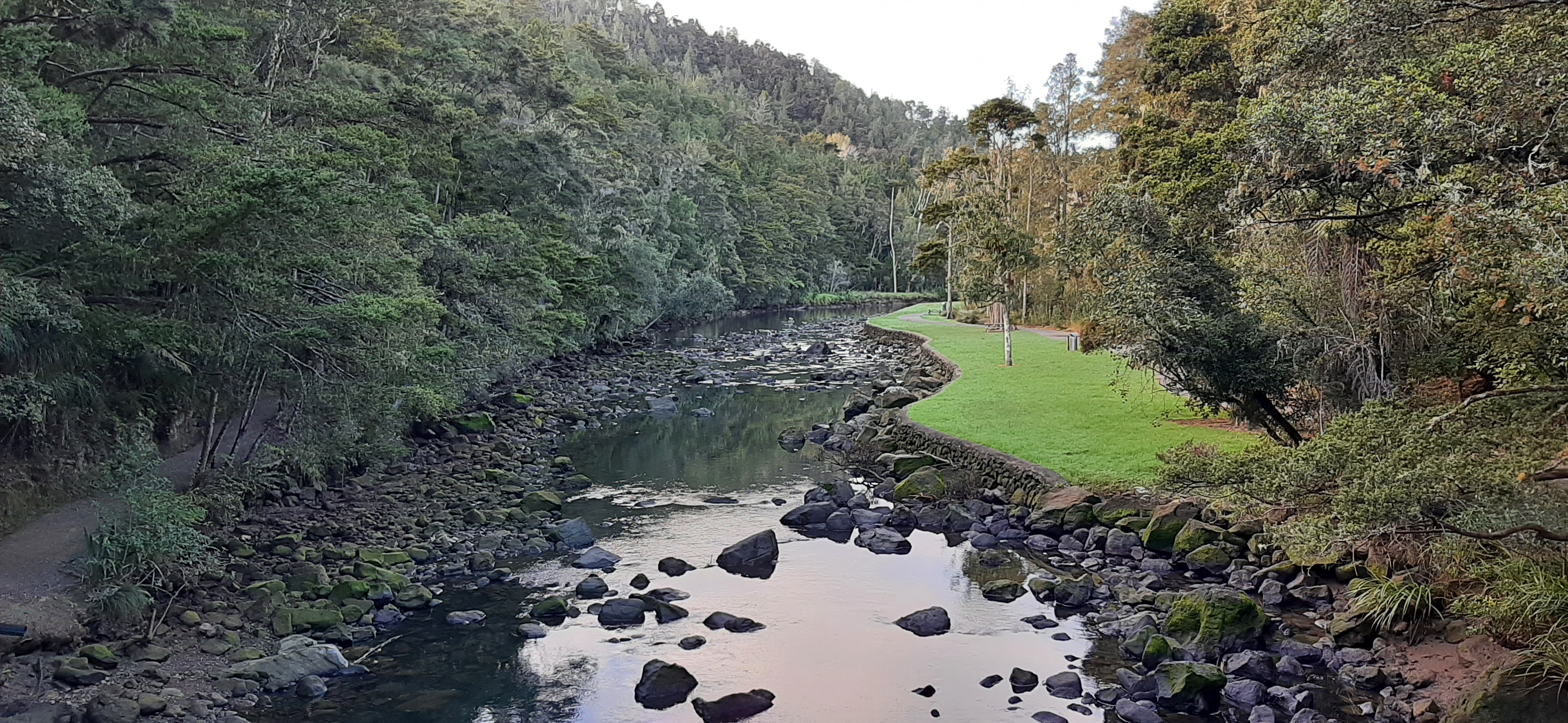
- Mair Park
- Interactive map of Mairtown
- Coordinates: 35.708°S 174.325°E
- Country: New Zealand
- City: Whangārei
- Local authority: Whangarei District Council
- Electoral ward: Whangārei Urban Ward

Area
  - Land: 94 ha (230 acres)

Population (June 2025)
  - Total: 2,440
  - Density: 2,600/km^{2} (6,700/sq mi)

Whau Valley	Otangarei	Tikipunga
Kensington	Mairtown	(Hātea River)
Woodhill	Regent	Riverside

Mairtown is a suburb of Whangārei, in Northland Region, New Zealand. It is about 2 kilometres north of the city centre. Mair Park runs between Mairtown and the Hātea River.

The area is named for the early settler Mair Family, including Gilbert Mair and his son Robert. Robert donated the land which is now Mair Park to the city in 1914. Tawatawhiti / Mair's Landing on the Hātea River is on the New Zealand Heritage List.

== Demographics ==
Mairtown covers 0.94 km^{2} (0.36 sq mi) and had an estimated population of 2,440 as of June 2025, with a population density of 2,596 people per km^{2}.

Historical population
Year	Pop.	±% p.a.
2006	2,205	—
2013	2,265	+0.38%
2018	2,475	+1.79%
2023	2,388	−0.71%

Mairtown had a population of 2,388 in the 2023 New Zealand census, a decrease of 87 people (−3.5%) since the 2018 census, and an increase of 123 people (5.4%) since the 2013 census. There were 1,056 males, 1,329 females and 3 people of other genders in 1,059 dwellings. 3.3% of people identified as LGBTIQ+. The median age was 46.9 years (compared with 38.1 years nationally). There were 375 people (15.7%) aged under 15 years, 384 (16.1%) aged 15 to 29, 960 (40.2%) aged 30 to 64, and 669 (28.0%) aged 65 or older.

People could identify as more than one ethnicity. The results were 74.2% European (Pākehā); 31.2% Māori; 4.5% Pasifika; 8.2% Asian; 0.5% Middle Eastern, Latin American and African New Zealanders (MELAA); and 2.5% other, which includes people giving their ethnicity as "New Zealander". English was spoken by 97.2%, Māori language by 7.7%, Samoan by 0.8%, and other languages by 9.3%. No language could be spoken by 1.9% (e.g. too young to talk). New Zealand Sign Language was known by 0.8%. The percentage of people born overseas was 19.5, compared with 28.8% nationally.

Religious affiliations were 35.3% Christian, 1.9% Hindu, 0.3% Islam, 2.3% Māori religious beliefs, 0.6% Buddhist, 0.3% New Age, and 2.1% other religions. People who answered that they had no religion were 49.1%, and 8.2% of people did not answer the census question.

Of those at least 15 years old, 324 (16.1%) people had a bachelor's or higher degree, 1,086 (53.9%) had a post-high school certificate or diploma, and 525 (26.1%) people exclusively held high school qualifications. The median income was $33,500, compared with $41,500 nationally. 144 people (7.2%) earned over $100,000 compared to 12.1% nationally. The employment status of those at least 15 was that 879 (43.7%) people were employed full-time, 228 (11.3%) were part-time, and 48 (2.4%) were unemployed.
