= Mair Park =

Park in Whangārei, New Zealand

Coordinates: 35°42′46″S 174°19′44″E

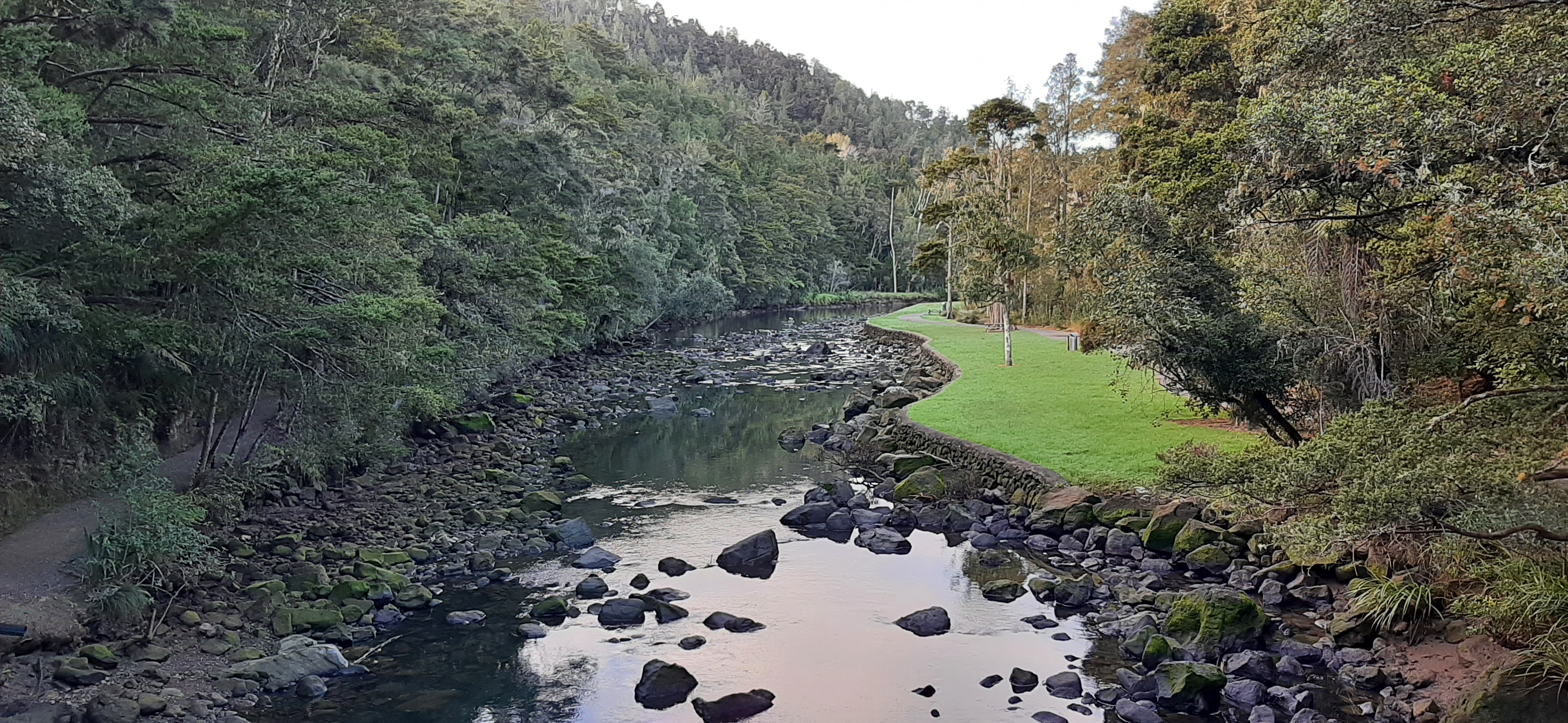
Mair Park in 2022

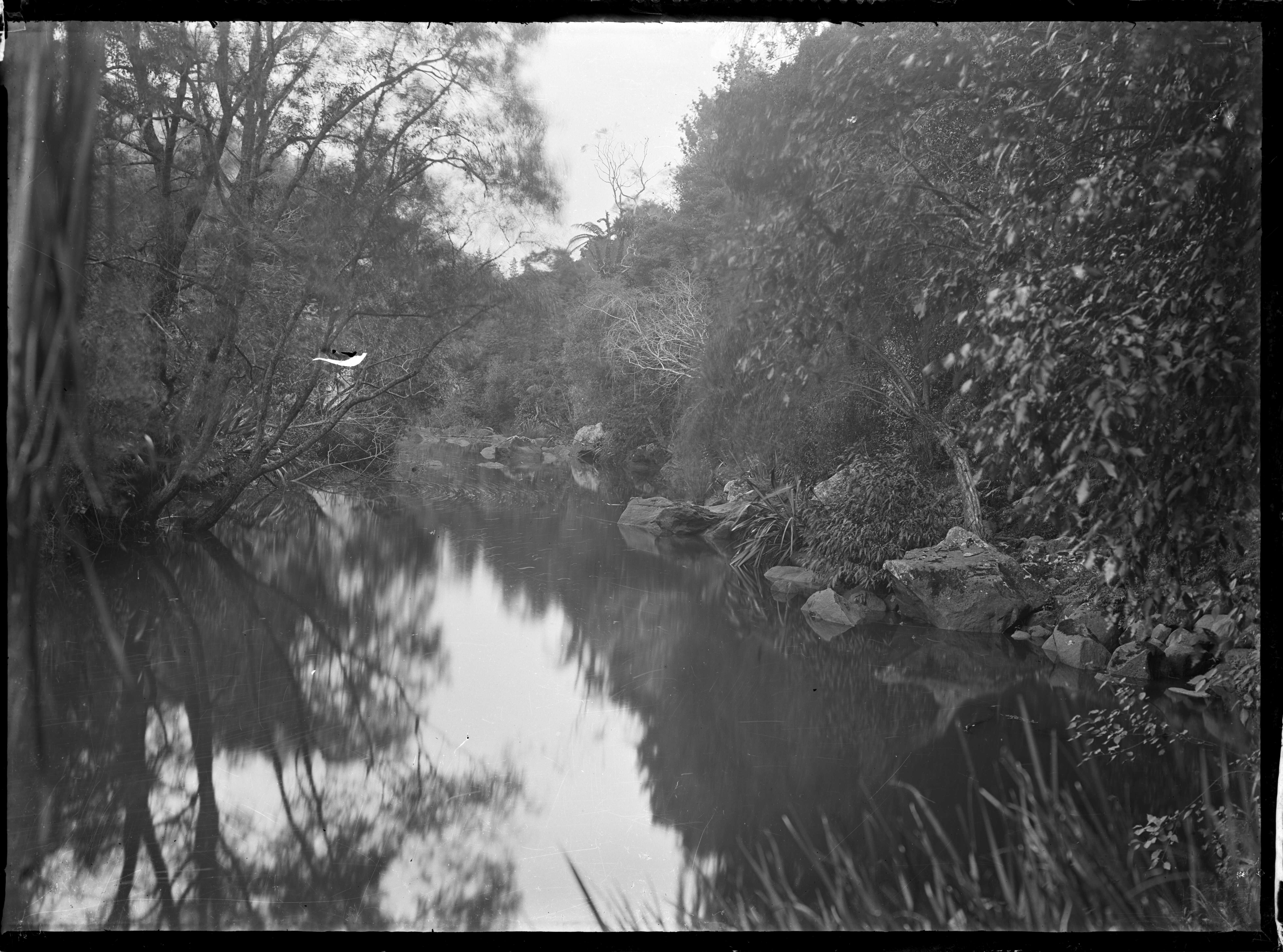
Photograph taken in the park in 1923

Mair Park is in Whangārei, New Zealand, adjacent to the suburb of Mairtown. It is named for Robert Mair, who donated the land from his estate to the city in 1914. The park includes access to the Hātea River. Access to the park is off Rurumoki Street.

A bridge leads over the river and connects to walking paths in the Parihaka Scenic Reserve. The park includes an orienteering course and a memorial cairn to Mair, one of the city's pioneers. Land adjacent to the park including an island on the river was given to the city in 2018.
