= Three Mile Bush =

- Suburb
- Interactive map of Three Mile Bush
- Coordinates: 35°41′S 174°17′E
- Country: New Zealand
- City: Whangārei

Population (2013)
  - Total: 999

Three Mile Bush is a suburb of Whangārei in Northland, New Zealand.

The population of Three Mile Bush was 999 in the 2013 Census, an increase of 350 from 2006.

In the 2018 census, statistics for the area were merged into Whau Valley, Matarau and Kamo.
