= Springs Flat, Whangārei =

Springs Flat
- Suburb
- Interactive map of Springs Flat
- Coordinates: 35.664°S 174.296°E
- Country: New Zealand
- City: Whangārei
- Electoral ward: Whangārei Urban Ward

Population (2013)
  - Total: 1,449

Springs Flat is a suburb to the north of Whangārei in Northland, New Zealand.

Springs Flat had a population of 1,449 at the 2013 New Zealand census, an increase of 87 people since the 2006 census. There were 705 males and 741 females. Figures have been rounded and may not add up to totals. 89.6% were European/Pākehā, 17.8% were Māori, 1.1% were Pacific peoples and 2.0% were Asian.

In the 2018 census, statistics for the area were merged into Kamo and Kauri.

== Education ==
Excellere College is a state-integrated coeducational composite (years 1–13) school with a roll of 350 students as of March 2026.
