= Kensington, Whangārei =

Kensington
- Suburb
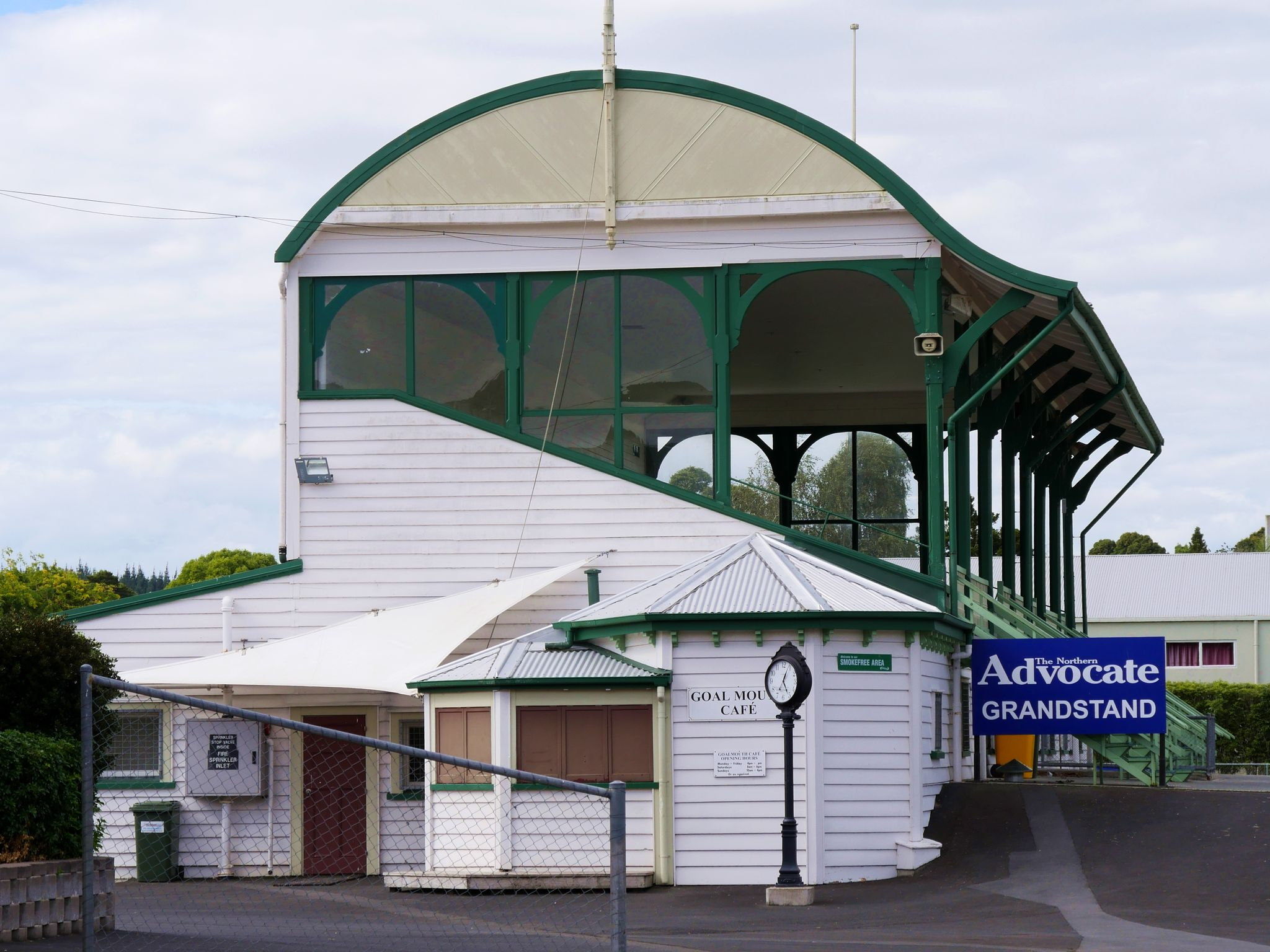
- Kensington Park Grandstand
- Interactive map of Kensington
- Coordinates: 35.710°S 174.314°E
- Country: New Zealand
- City: Whangārei
- Local authority: Whangarei District Council
- Electoral ward: Whangārei Urban Ward

Area
  - Land: 311 ha (770 acres)

Population (June 2025)
  - Total: 3,450
  - Density: 1,110/km^{2} (2,870/sq mi)

Whau Valley	Otangarei
Kensington	Mairtown
Woodhill	Regent

Kensington (Māori: Tawatawhiti) is a suburb of Whangārei, in Northland Region, New Zealand. It is about 2 kilometres north of the city centre. State Highway 1 runs through Kensington, The Western Hills form a boundary on the west, and Hātea River on the east.

The area includes Whangarei Quarry Gardens, a 24 hectare public garden set around an artificial lake.

== History ==
In 2018, Whangarei District Council completed improvements to the Kensington Avenue and Kamo Road intersection, following delays since 2014 in acquiring properties.

In April 2020, Police investigated the death of a five-month-old baby at a home in Kensington.

The following month, Police recovered a stolen vehicle with a baby inside from a property in Kensington. The vehicle had been stolen from a nearby petrol station before being abandoned.

A major storm struck Kensington in July 2018. It caused extensive damage to the Whangarei Quarry Gardens, and at least one home was evacuated.

In August 2020, the first stage of a $15.5 million development opened in Kensington. The complex includes a medical centre, gym, physio, food outlets and an early childhood centre. The property was owned by Northland Regional Council, and was previously the site of a Woolworths and Countdown supermarket, but had been vacant since 2014.

== Demographics ==
Kensington covers 3.11 km^{2} (1.20 sq mi) and had an estimated population of 3,450 as of June 2025, with a population density of 1,109 people per km^{2}.

Historical population
Year	Pop.	±% p.a.
2006	3,201	—
2013	3,012	−0.87%
2018	3,240	+1.47%
2023	3,339	+0.60%

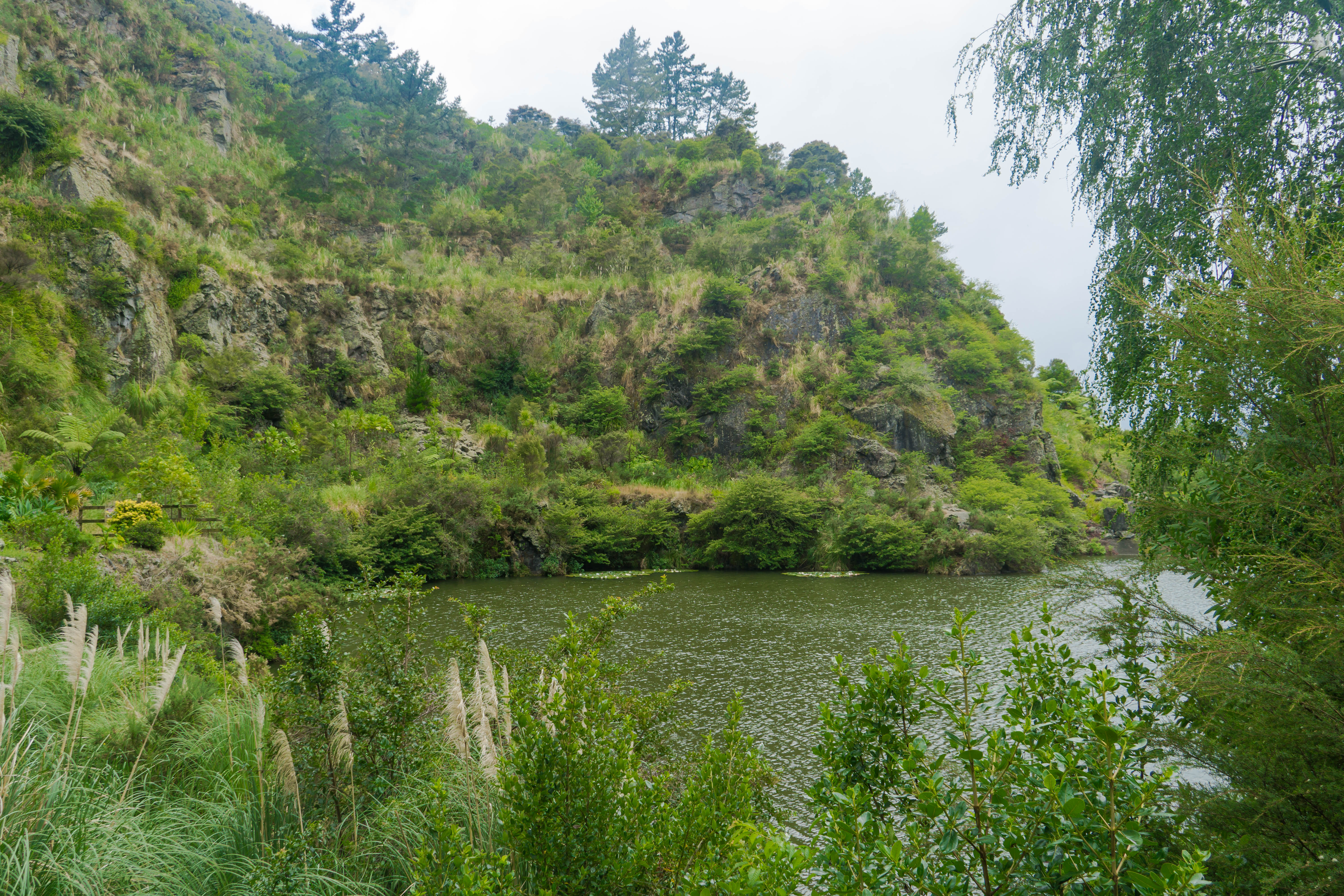
Lake at Whangarei Quarry Gardens

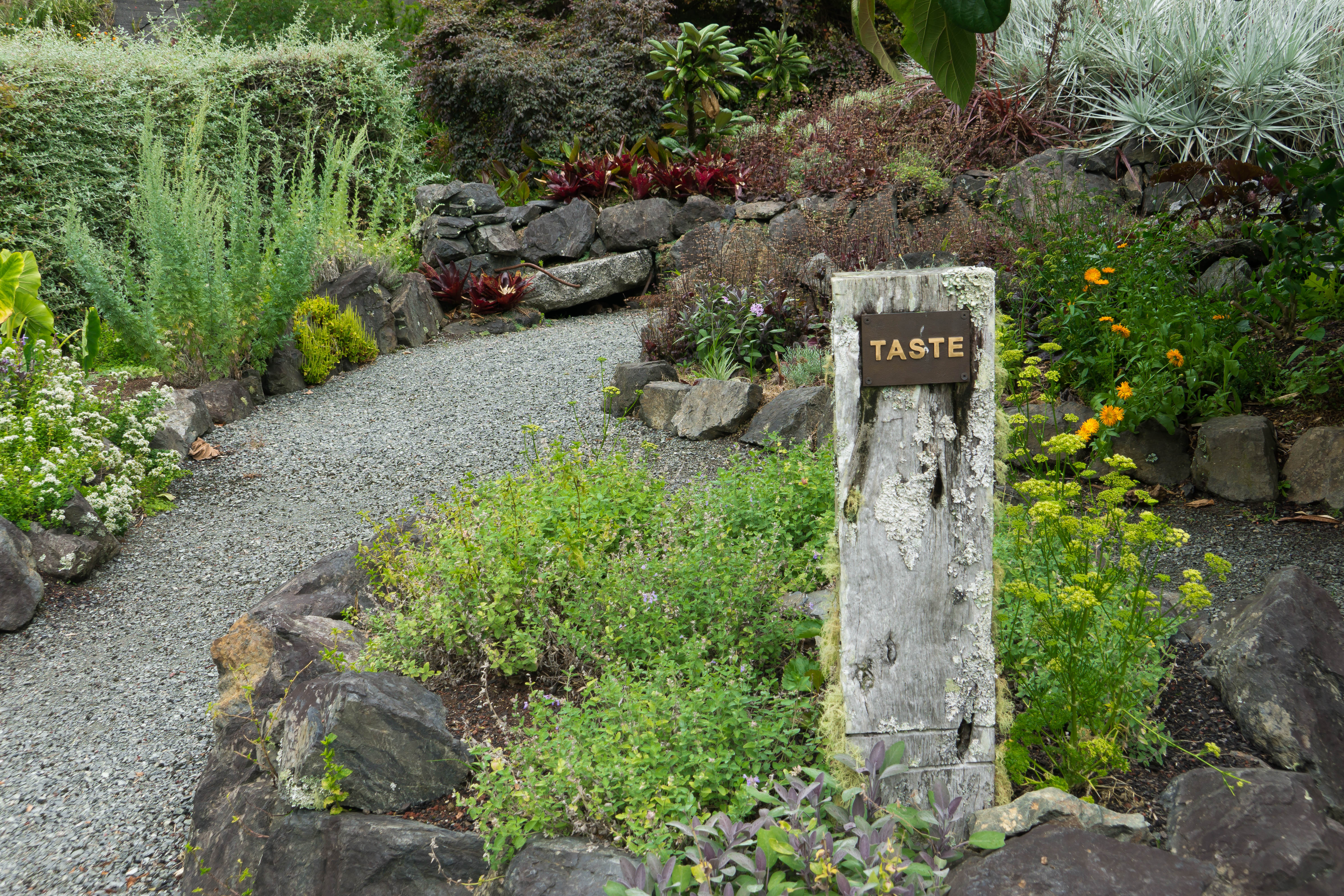
Scene at Whangarei Quarry Gardens

Kensington had a population of 3,339 in the 2023 New Zealand census, an increase of 99 people (3.1%) since the 2018 census, and an increase of 327 people (10.9%) since the 2013 census. There were 1,497 males, 1,833 females and 9 people of other genders in 1,422 dwellings. 4.2% of people identified as LGBTIQ+. The median age was 45.4 years (compared with 38.1 years nationally). There were 528 people (15.8%) aged under 15 years, 549 (16.4%) aged 15 to 29, 1,467 (43.9%) aged 30 to 64, and 792 (23.7%) aged 65 or older.

People could identify as more than one ethnicity. The results were 72.3% European (Pākehā); 29.9% Māori; 5.5% Pasifika; 11.9% Asian; 0.8% Middle Eastern, Latin American and African New Zealanders (MELAA); and 1.8% other, which includes people giving their ethnicity as "New Zealander". English was spoken by 96.4%, Māori language by 6.9%, Samoan by 0.2%, and other languages by 12.3%. No language could be spoken by 2.2% (e.g. too young to talk). New Zealand Sign Language was known by 0.6%. The percentage of people born overseas was 22.6, compared with 28.8% nationally.

Religious affiliations were 35.6% Christian, 2.0% Hindu, 0.6% Islam, 2.3% Māori religious beliefs, 1.1% Buddhist, 0.4% New Age, and 1.9% other religions. People who answered that they had no religion were 48.2%, and 7.9% of people did not answer the census question.

Of those at least 15 years old, 444 (15.8%) people had a bachelor's or higher degree, 1,479 (52.6%) had a post-high school certificate or diploma, and 759 (27.0%) people exclusively held high school qualifications. The median income was $34,800, compared with $41,500 nationally. 222 people (7.9%) earned over $100,000 compared to 12.1% nationally. The employment status of those at least 15 was that 1,266 (45.0%) people were employed full-time, 357 (12.7%) were part-time, and 93 (3.3%) were unemployed.
