= Otangarei =

- Suburb
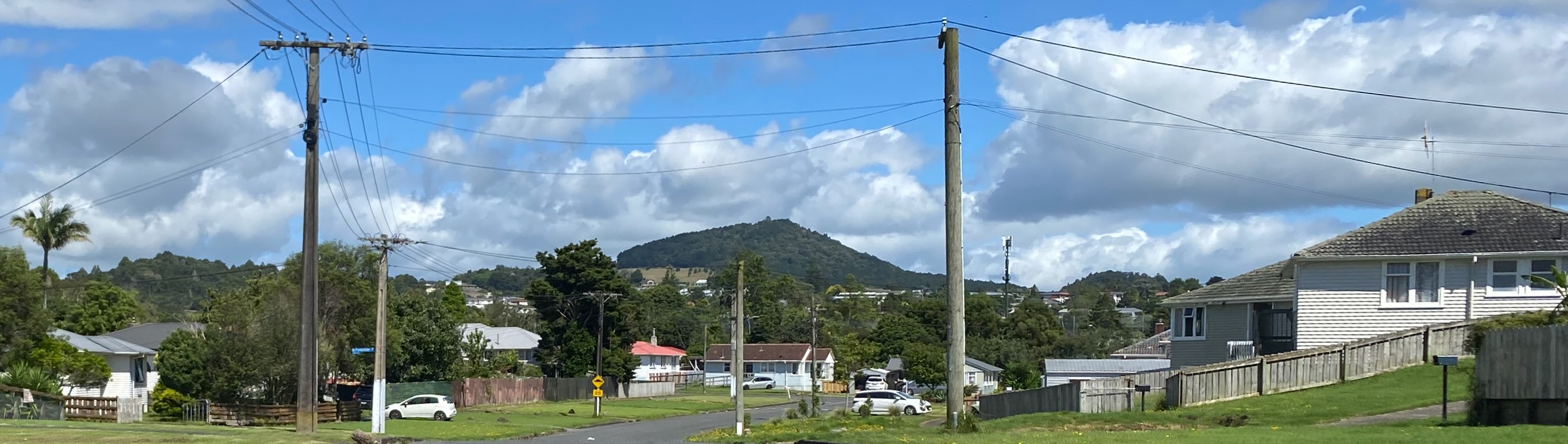
- Interactive map of Otangarei
- Coordinates: 35°41′34″S 174°19′9″E
- Country: New Zealand
- City: Whangarei District Council
- Electoral ward: Whangārei Urban Ward

Area
  - Land: 77 ha (190 acres)

Population (June 2025)
  - Total: 2,180
  - Density: 2,800/km^{2} (7,300/sq mi)

Kamo		Tikipunga
Whau Valley	Otangarei
Kensington	Mairtown	(Mount Parihaka)

Otangarei is a suburb of Whangārei, in Northland Region, New Zealand.

The New Zealand Ministry for Culture and Heritage gives a translation of "place of [a] group of people leaping" for Ōtāngarei.

Te Kotahitanga Marae o Otangarei is the community's local marae. It is a meeting ground for the Ngāpuhi hapū of Uri o Te Tangata, and features Te Puawaitanga Hou meeting house.

== Demographics ==
Otangarei covers 0.77 km^{2} (0.30 sq mi) and had an estimated population of 2,180 as of June 2025, with a population density of 2,831 people per km^{2}.

Historical population
Year	Pop.	±% p.a.
2006	2,139	—
2013	1,635	−3.77%
2018	2,109	+5.22%
2023	2,211	+0.95%
The 2006 population is for a larger area of 1.04 km^{2} Source:

Otangarei had a population of 2,211 in the 2023 New Zealand census, an increase of 102 people (4.8%) since the 2018 census, and an increase of 576 people (35.2%) since the 2013 census. There were 1,101 males, 1,101 females and 9 people of other genders in 588 dwellings. 1.9% of people identified as LGBTIQ+. The median age was 28.8 years (compared with 38.1 years nationally). There were 648 people (29.3%) aged under 15 years, 501 (22.7%) aged 15 to 29, 846 (38.3%) aged 30 to 64, and 219 (9.9%) aged 65 or older.

People could identify as more than one ethnicity. The results were 33.8% European (Pākehā); 78.3% Māori; 10.2% Pasifika; 2.6% Asian; 0.3% Middle Eastern, Latin American and African New Zealanders (MELAA); and 1.1% other, which includes people giving their ethnicity as "New Zealander". English was spoken by 94.7%, Māori language by 26.5%, Samoan by 1.5%, and other languages by 3.4%. No language could be spoken by 2.6% (e.g. too young to talk). New Zealand Sign Language was known by 1.4%. The percentage of people born overseas was 5.8, compared with 28.8% nationally.

Religious affiliations were 27.5% Christian, 0.3% Hindu, 0.4% Islam, 14.8% Māori religious beliefs, 0.1% Buddhist, 0.5% New Age, and 1.5% other religions. People who answered that they had no religion were 49.3%, and 6.6% of people did not answer the census question.

Of those at least 15 years old, 66 (4.2%) people had a bachelor's or higher degree, 903 (57.8%) had a post-high school certificate or diploma, and 582 (37.2%) people exclusively held high school qualifications. The median income was $26,900, compared with $41,500 nationally. 21 people (1.3%) earned over $100,000 compared to 12.1% nationally. The employment status of those at least 15 was that 507 (32.4%) people were employed full-time, 162 (10.4%) were part-time, and 159 (10.2%) were unemployed.

== Education ==
Te Kura o Otangarei is a coeducational full primary (years 1-8) school with a decile rating of 1 and 88 students as of March 2026. It opened in 1955 as Otangarei Primary School and opened its full immersion Māori language unit in 1996. It expanded to include year 7 and 8 students in 2004, and adopted its current name in 2006. The school offers a choice between full immersion Māori language classes, bilingual classes or mainstream education.

As of 2018, there are also adult education classes in Te Reo Māori, Tikanga Marae and Waiata on a weekly basis for both the Otangarei and wider communities held at Te Puawaitanga Marae by Shaquille Shortland.

== Sport ==
=== Rugby ===
City RFC are based in Otangarei and play in the Northland Rugby Union South Zone competitions. The club colours are blue & white hoops.

=== Rugby league ===
City Knights (formerly Kensington Knights) are based in Otangarei and play in the Whangarei City & Districts rugby league competitions.
