= Tikipunga =

- Suburb
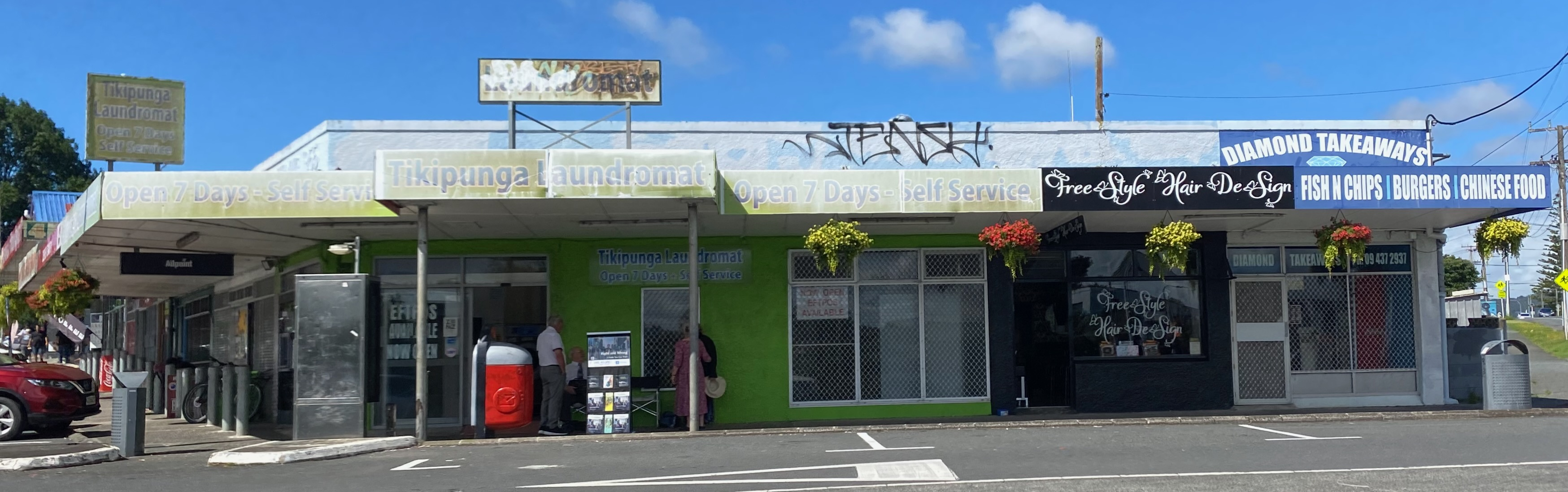
- Shopping strip on Kiripaka Rd
- Interactive map of Tikipunga
- Coordinates: 35°41′06″S 174°19′43″E
- Country: New Zealand
- City: Whangārei
- Electoral ward: Whangārei Urban Ward

Area
  - Land: 575 ha (1,420 acres)

Population (June 2025)
  - Total: 8,510
  - Density: 1,480/km^{2} (3,830/sq mi)

Kauri	Totara Parklands	Glenbervie
Kamo	Tikipunga
Whau Valley	Otangarei

Tikipunga is one of the biggest suburbs in Whangārei, New Zealand. It is in the north-east part of the city and has the landmark Whangārei Falls nearby.

== Demographics ==
Tikipunga covers 5.75 km^{2} (2.22 sq mi) and had an estimated population of 8,510 as of June 2025, with a population density of 1,480 people per km^{2}.

Historical population
Year	Pop.	±% p.a.
2006	5,763	—
2013	5,484	−0.71%
2018	6,903	+4.71%
2023	7,725	+2.28%
The 2006 population is for a smaller area of 5.48 km^{2} Source:

Tikipunga had a population of 7,725 in the 2023 New Zealand census, an increase of 822 people (11.9%) since the 2018 census, and an increase of 2,241 people (40.9%) since the 2013 census. There were 3,645 males, 4,065 females and 18 people of other genders in 2,841 dwellings. 2.4% of people identified as LGBTIQ+. The median age was 37.2 years (compared with 38.1 years nationally). There were 1,659 people (21.5%) aged under 15 years, 1,395 (18.1%) aged 15 to 29, 2,925 (37.9%) aged 30 to 64, and 1,749 (22.6%) aged 65 or older.

People could identify as more than one ethnicity. The results were 67.7% European (Pākehā); 41.0% Māori; 6.1% Pasifika; 8.1% Asian; 0.7% Middle Eastern, Latin American and African New Zealanders (MELAA); and 1.4% other, which includes people giving their ethnicity as "New Zealander". English was spoken by 96.7%, Māori language by 10.6%, Samoan by 0.4%, and other languages by 8.7%. No language could be spoken by 2.0% (e.g. too young to talk). New Zealand Sign Language was known by 0.6%. The percentage of people born overseas was 17.0, compared with 28.8% nationally.

Religious affiliations were 35.9% Christian, 1.3% Hindu, 0.2% Islam, 3.4% Māori religious beliefs, 0.6% Buddhist, 0.5% New Age, and 1.1% other religions. People who answered that they had no religion were 49.7%, and 7.5% of people did not answer the census question.

Of those at least 15 years old, 747 (12.3%) people had a bachelor's or higher degree, 3,363 (55.4%) had a post-high school certificate or diploma, and 1,737 (28.6%) people exclusively held high school qualifications. The median income was $33,600, compared with $41,500 nationally. 342 people (5.6%) earned over $100,000 compared to 12.1% nationally. The employment status of those at least 15 was that 2,619 (43.2%) people were employed full-time, 699 (11.5%) were part-time, and 192 (3.2%) were unemployed.

Individual statistical areas
Name	Area (km^{2})	Population	Density (per km^{2})	Dwellings	Median age	Median income
Tikipunga North	3.01	3,939	1,309	1,437	36.6 years	$32,400
Tikipunga South	2.74	3,789	1,383	1,404	38.0 years	$34,700
New Zealand					38.1 years	$41,500

== Attractions ==
The nearby Whangārei Falls have since the 1940s been in public ownership.

== Education ==
Tikipunga High School is a state coeducational year 7–13 secondary school on Corks Road, with a roll of 375 students as of March 2026. The school opened in 1971.

Tikipunga Primary School is a contributing primary (years 1–6) school with a roll of 328 students as of March 2026.

Te Kura Kaupapa Maori o Te Rawhiti Roa is a composite (years 1–15) school with a roll of 186 students as of March 2026.

All these schools are coeducational.

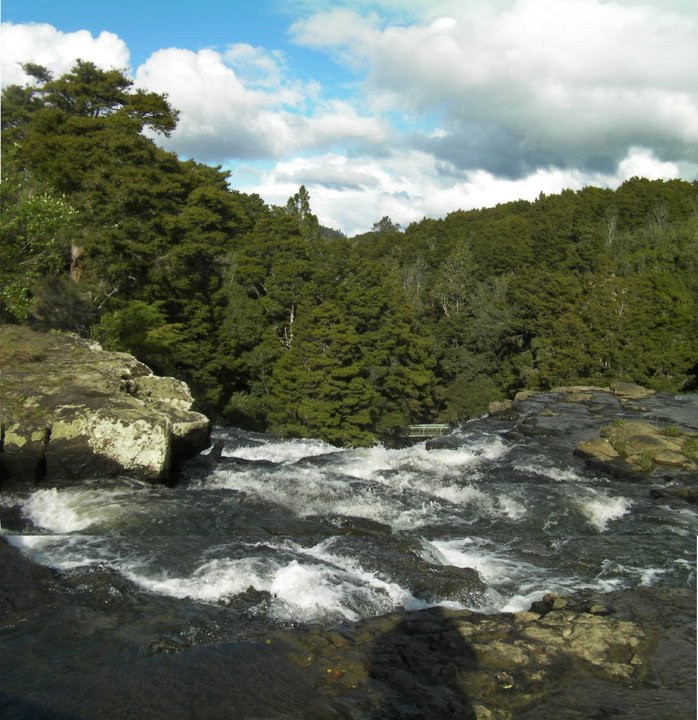
Whangārei Falls as seen from a walkway over the river.

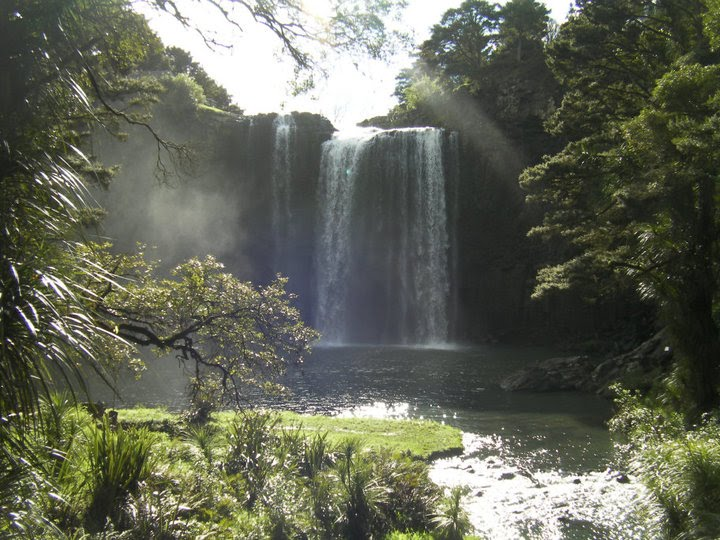
Falls from below.

== Amenities ==
The Paramount Plaza shopping centre on Paramount Parade serves the suburb and is anchored by a large Woolworths Supermarket. It contains a service station, several food outlets, a liquor store, a pharmacy, a video store and a medical centre. Nearby is the Tikipunga branch of the Whangārei Libraries. There is also a smaller suburban shopping strip on the corner of Kiripaka Road and Spedding Road.
