= Whangārei =

Whangārei Whangārei-Terenga-Parāoa (Māori)
- City
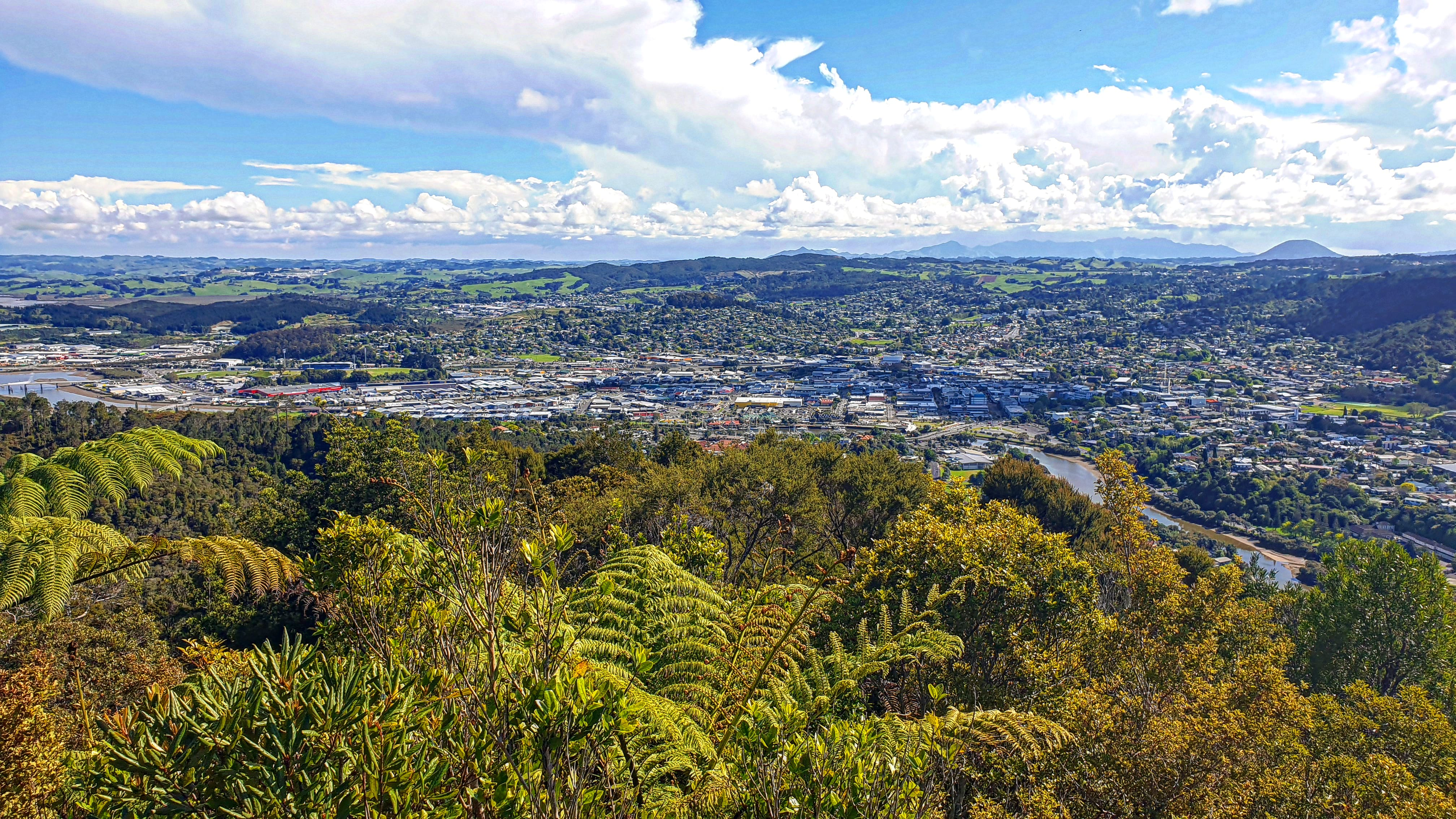
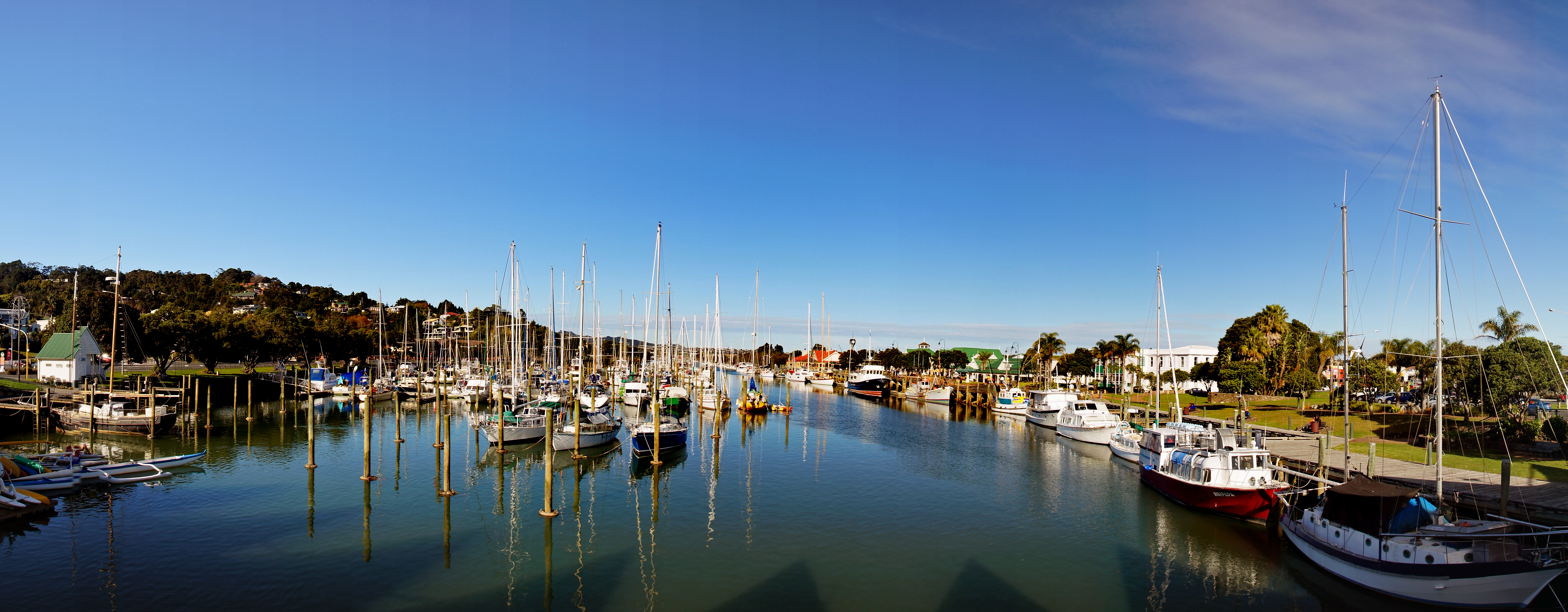
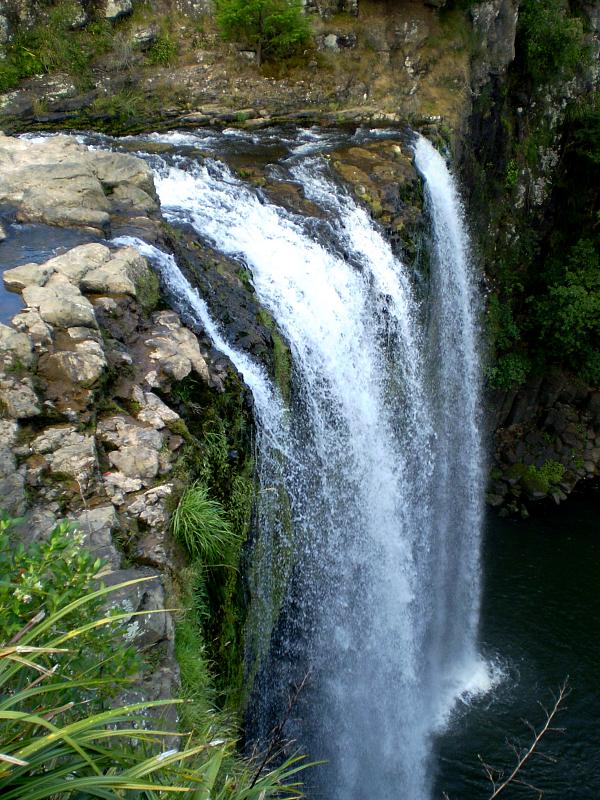
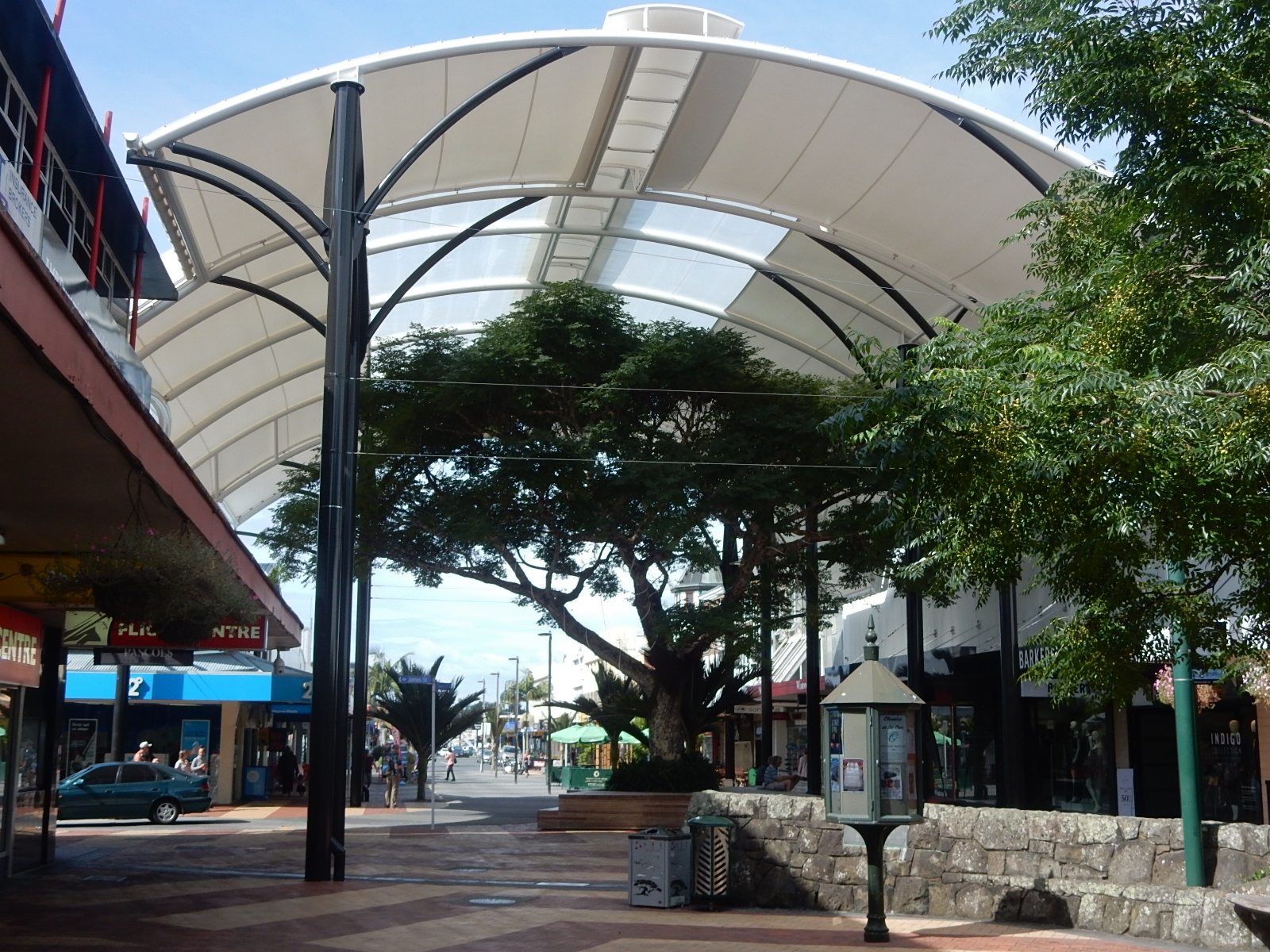
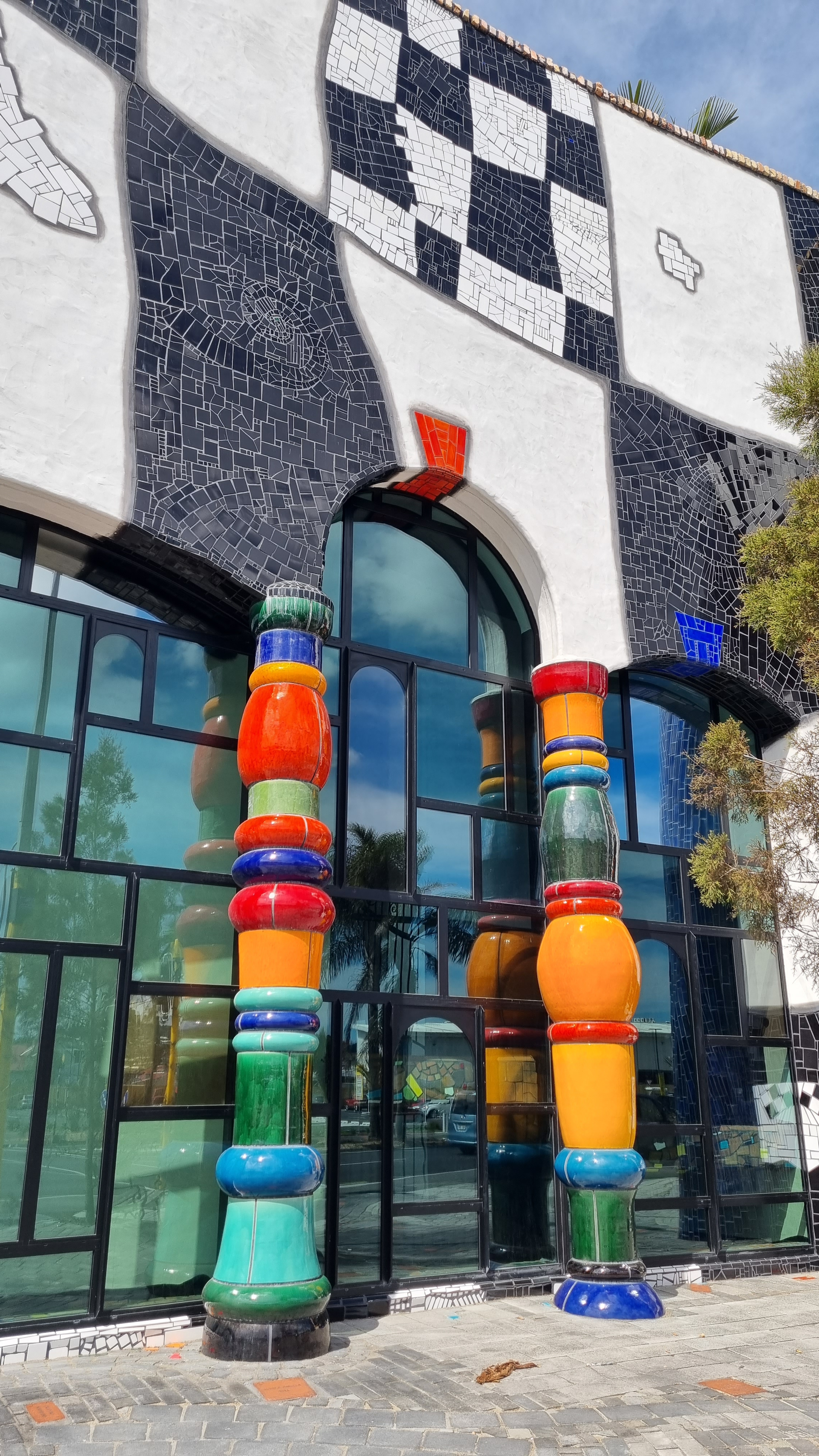
- From top, left to right: Whangārei city from Mt Parihaka, Whangārei Marina, Whangārei Falls, Whangārei Mall, the entrance of the Hundertwasser Art Centre
- Nicknames: The Rei, Whangas
- Mottoes: Non Nobis Solum, Love It Here, City of 100 Beaches
- Location within Northland Region Location within New Zealand
- Coordinates: 35°43′30″S 174°19′25″E
- Country: New Zealand
- Region: Northland
- Territorial authority: Whangarei District
- Pre 1989: Whangārei City
- Constituted as town district: 5 June 1882
- Proclaimed borough: 1 October 1896
- Proclaimed city: 21 May 1964
- Merged into Whangarei District: 1 November 1989
- Named for: Reipae (a Waikato princess)
- NZ Parliament: Te Tai Tokerau (Māori); Whangārei

Government
  - Mayor: Ken Couper
  - MPs: Mariameno Kapa-Kingi (Te Pāti Māori); Shane Reti (National)

Area
  - Urban: 63.53 km^{2} (24.53 sq mi)

Population (June 2025)
  - Urban: 56,100
  - Urban density: 883/km^{2} (2,290/sq mi)
- Time zone: UTC+12 (NZST)
  - Summer (DST): UTC+13 (NZDT)
- Postcode: 0110, 0112 (urban)
- Area code: 09
- Local iwi: Ngāpuhi, Ngāti Wai
- Website: www.wdc.govt.nz

Whangārei (Note: (Māori (local dialect) pronunciation [haˈŋaːˌɾɛi]), Māori (Waikato dialect) pronunciation [ɸaˈŋaːˌɾɛi])) is the northernmost city in New Zealand and the largest settlement of the Northland Region. It is part of the Whangarei District, created in 1989 from the former Whangarei City, Whangarei County and Hikurangi Town councils to administer both the city and its hinterland. The city population was estimated to be 56,100 in June 2025, an increase from 47,000 in 2001.

== Etymology ==
The origin of the name Whangārei is unclear, as a number of traditional Māori stories are associated with the harbour. One major tradition involves the sisters Reitū and Reipae of the Tainui migratory waka, who either flew from the Waikato north on the backs of birds, or in the form of birds.

Another version of the naming of Whangarei relates the construction of a great canoe and its maiden vogage. Local tohunga and distinguished tohunga from the north were onboard for the first voyage; a whaling expedition. According to legend, one of the local tohunga engaged the guest of honour, a wise tohunga with high mana from the north, in discussion. He was attempting to gain information from him without his knowledge. However, the tohunga from the north asked him 'E aha tau e whanga nei te rei o te tohorā' (why are you waiting for the opportunity of extracting the whale's breastbone'. The local tohunga was mortified as trying to steal another tohunga's mana was a terrible and despicable act. The name Whangarei refers to whanga (waiting) and rei (treasured possession).

Other traditions describe the meaning of Whangārei as "lying in wait to ambush", referring to warriors watching over the harbour from Castle Rock, or Whangārei meaning "to gather", referring to the harbour as a gathering place for whales or for important rangatira.

== History ==
The harbour is known from traditional histories as a landing point for many of the migratory waka which reached New Zealand, including Tūnui-ā-rangi and Te Arawa. Many stories involving the Whangārei Harbour involve the legendary chief Manaia. Whangārei was traditionally an important location for trade during much of pre-European Māori history, linking the Muriwhenua iwi of the far north, the residents of the Hauraki Gulf islands, and Tāmaki Māori iwi to the south. An overland route, the Mangapai portage, allowed waka to be hauled between the Whangārei Harbour in the east, and the Wairoa River and Kaipara Harbour to the west along the Mangapai River.

A number of Māori iwi are associated with the early history of Whangārei, including Ngare Raumati, Ngāi Tāhuhu, Ngātiwai and Te Parawhau. In the late 18th century, Ngāpuhi expanded south into the Whangārei area.

Captain James Cook and the crew of the Endeavour were the first Europeans to sight the Whangārei Harbour entrance. On 15 November 1769 they caught about a hundred fish in the harbour, which they classified as "bream" (probably snapper), prompting Cook to name the area Bream Bay. In the early 19th century, when Europeans began visiting the harbour more regularly, Ngāpuhi occupied Whangārei, and the Te Parawhau hapū lived at the head of the harbour.

In the 1820s, the area was repeatedly attacked by Waikato and Ngāti Pāoa raiders during the Musket Wars. The first European settler was William Carruth, a Scotsman and trader, who arrived in 1839 and was joined six years later by Gilbert Mair and his family. Relations between the settlers and local Māori were generally friendly, but in February 1842, all settler farms were plundered in revenge for transgressions of tapu. In April 1845, during the Flagstaff War, all settlers fled from Whangārei. Most of the original settlers never returned, but by the mid-1850s there were a number of farmers and orchardists in the area. From 1855, a small town developed, driven by the kauri gum trade. Today's 'Town Basin' on the Hātea River was the original port. Early exports included kauri gum and native timber, followed later by coal from Whau Valley, Kamo, and Hikurangi. Coal from the Kiripaka field was exported via the Ngunguru River. By 1864, the nucleus of the present city was established.

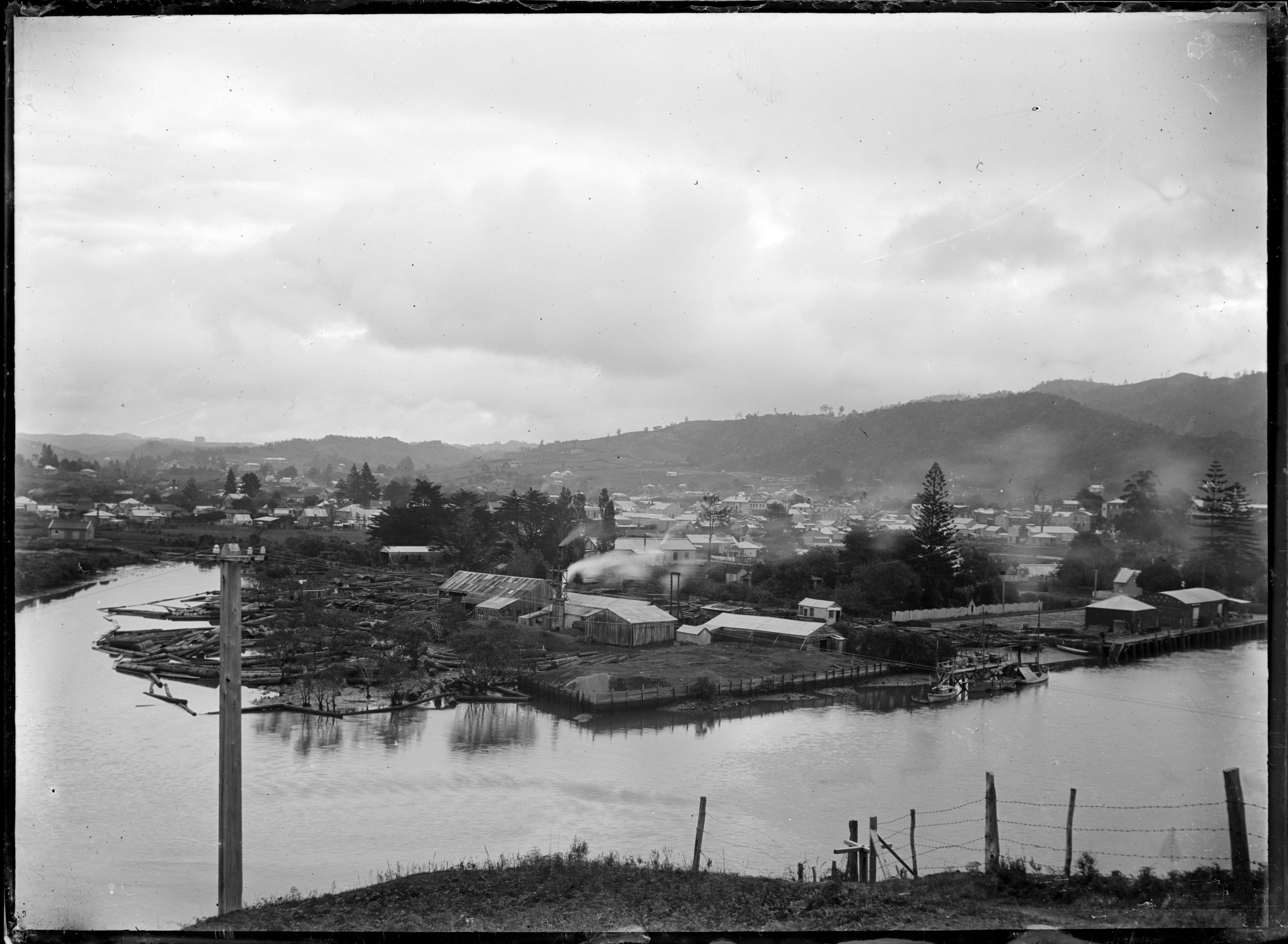
View of Whangārei from the foot of Mt Parihaka, showing the Hātea River in the foreground and a timber mill across the river. By Albert Percy Godber in 1911.

Fire bricks made from fire clay deposits near the Kamo mines supported a brickworks over several decades. Good quality limestone was quarried at Hikurangi, Portland and Limestone Island, and initially sold as agricultural lime, and later combined with local coal to produce Portland cement at the settlement of Portland on the south side of the harbour. Local limestone is still used in cement manufacture, but the coal is now imported from the West Coast of the South Island.

Whangārei was the most urbanised area in Northland towards the end of the 19th century, but grew slowly in the 20th century. The district slowly exhausted most of its natural resources but was sustained by agriculture, especially dairying. Shipping was the main transport link until the North Auckland railway line reached the town in 1925, and the road from Auckland was not suitable for travel in poor weather until 1934. These terrestrial travel routes forced a rapid decline in coastal shipping but stimulated Whangārei to become the service centre for Northland. The population was 14,000 in 1945, but grew rapidly in the 1960s, incorporating Kamo and other outlying areas. In 1964, Whangārei was declared a city. Its population the following year was 31,000.

The second half of the twentieth century brought the establishment and expansion of the oil refinery at Marsden Point on Bream Bay, the adjacent development of timber processing and the establishment of Northland Port, which is mainly focused on timber exporting.

Building of the Hundertwasser Art Centre with Wairau Māori Art Gallery commenced in 2018 after the funding target of $20.97 million was raised by a volunteer team in time for a June 2017 deadline, and the centre opened in February 2022.

== Geography ==
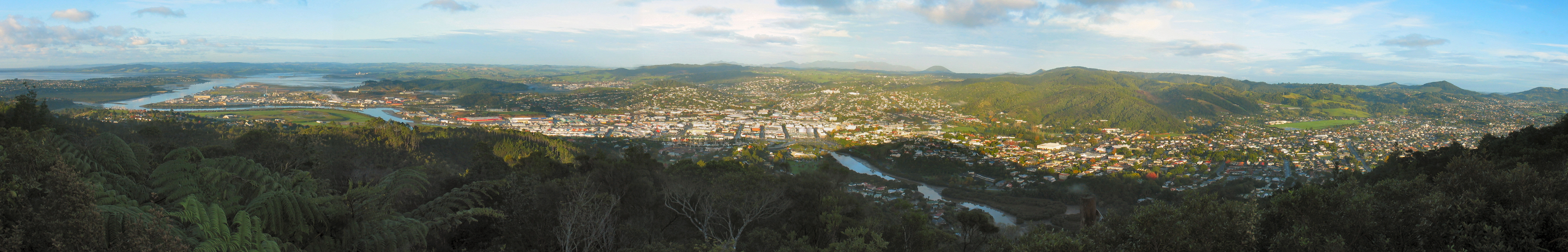
Panorama of Whangārei from Mt Parihaka

=== Geographical features ===
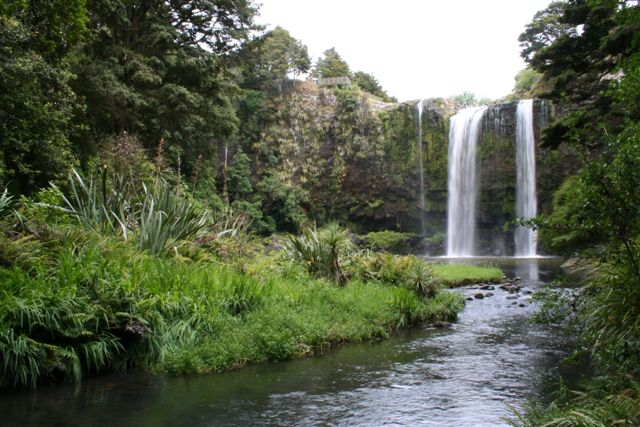
Whangārei Falls

Mount Parihaka is a volcanic dome rising 259 metres (850 ft) to the northeast of the city centre and part of the Whangārei volcanic field. It is about 20 million years old, and aligns with the Harbour Fault, which also aligns with the volcanoes of Parakiore near Kamo, and Hikurangi near the town of the same name. The dome is surrounded by the Parihaka Scenic Reserve. There is road access to the summit of Parihaka and walking tracks through the reserve, and a bridge linking it to Mair Park. The dome is frequently called Mount Parahaki, but the original Māori spelling of Parihaka was confirmed by the government in 2005.

The Hātea River flows south through the city and empties into Whangārei Harbour. The river has a spectacular 26-metre (85 ft) waterfall in Tikipunga, 6 kilometres (3.7 miles) north of the city.

Matakohe, or Limestone Island, lies in the harbour close to the city. Owned by Whangarei District, it is subject to ecological island restoration by the Friends of Matakohe/Limestone Island Society.

=== Suburbs ===
Whangārei Central is the main business district. The city's urban area spreads through the valleys of the surrounding area. The suburbs are:

- Northern: Te Kamo, Springs Flat, Tikipunga, Three Mile Bush, Otangarei, Mairtown, Regent, Kensington and Whau Valley
- Southern/Western: Morningside, Raumanga, Maunu, Horahora, Woodhill, and The Avenues
- Eastern: Riverside, Port Whangārei, Sherwood Rise, Onerahi, and Parahaki.

=== Climate ===
Whangārei has an oceanic climate (Köppen Cfb). The climate in this area has mild differences between highs and lows. Summer days occasionally exceed 30 °C, and there is plentiful rainfall spread relatively evenly throughout the year. Using the Trewartha classification Whangārei is firmly a maritime subtropical climate due to its absence of winter cold.

Climate data for Whangārei Airport (1991–2020 normals, 1967–present)
Month	Jan	Feb	Mar	Apr	May	Jun	Jul	Aug	Sep	Oct	Nov	Dec	Year
Record high °C (°F)	31.2 (88.2)	33.5 (92.3)	29.6 (85.3)	27.3 (81.1)	24.8 (76.6)	22.6 (72.7)	20.3 (68.5)	22.8 (73.0)	24.2 (75.6)	26.3 (79.3)	28.7 (83.7)	31.5 (88.7)	33.5 (92.3)
Mean maximum °C (°F)	28.5 (83.3)	28.7 (83.7)	26.5 (79.7)	24.8 (76.6)	22.3 (72.1)	20.0 (68.0)	18.9 (66.0)	19.6 (67.3)	21.3 (70.3)	23.0 (73.4)	25.4 (77.7)	27.3 (81.1)	29.5 (85.1)
Mean daily maximum °C (°F)	24.6 (76.3)	24.7 (76.5)	23.2 (73.8)	20.9 (69.6)	18.5 (65.3)	16.3 (61.3)	15.5 (59.9)	15.9 (60.6)	17.5 (63.5)	19.0 (66.2)	20.8 (69.4)	23.0 (73.4)	20.0 (68.0)
Daily mean °C (°F)	20.2 (68.4)	20.6 (69.1)	19.0 (66.2)	17.0 (62.6)	14.8 (58.6)	12.7 (54.9)	11.8 (53.2)	12.2 (54.0)	13.5 (56.3)	15.0 (59.0)	16.6 (61.9)	18.8 (65.8)	16.0 (60.8)
Mean daily minimum °C (°F)	15.8 (60.4)	16.4 (61.5)	14.9 (58.8)	13.1 (55.6)	11.2 (52.2)	9.1 (48.4)	8.1 (46.6)	8.4 (47.1)	9.6 (49.3)	10.9 (51.6)	12.4 (54.3)	14.5 (58.1)	12.0 (53.6)
Mean minimum °C (°F)	11.1 (52.0)	12.3 (54.1)	10.5 (50.9)	8.1 (46.6)	5.8 (42.4)	3.6 (38.5)	2.6 (36.7)	3.4 (38.1)	4.6 (40.3)	6.4 (43.5)	7.9 (46.2)	10.0 (50.0)	2.1 (35.8)
Record low °C (°F)	8.1 (46.6)	8.7 (47.7)	6.1 (43.0)	4.1 (39.4)	2.0 (35.6)	−0.1 (31.8)	0.0 (32.0)	0.4 (32.7)	1.9 (35.4)	3.3 (37.9)	3.5 (38.3)	6.5 (43.7)	−0.1 (31.8)
Average rainfall mm (inches)	78.0 (3.07)	83.2 (3.28)	119.2 (4.69)	94.1 (3.70)	112.9 (4.44)	142.2 (5.60)	173.5 (6.83)	130.0 (5.12)	112.3 (4.42)	76.8 (3.02)	75.9 (2.99)	90.9 (3.58)	1,289 (50.74)
Average rainy days (≥ 1.0 mm)	6.9	7.3	9.0	9.7	13.1	14.0	15.0	15.2	12.9	10.3	9.2	8.8	131.4
Average relative humidity (%)	79.0	84.0	85.9	86.2	88.3	89.4	89.0	86.1	80.9	81.0	76.9	77.5	83.7
Source: NIWA Climate Data

Climate data for Whangarei City (1991–2020 normals, extremes 1970–1988, 2015–present)
Month	Jan	Feb	Mar	Apr	May	Jun	Jul	Aug	Sep	Oct	Nov	Dec	Year
Record high °C (°F)	31.3 (88.3)	34.1 (93.4)	29.0 (84.2)	27.1 (80.8)	25.3 (77.5)	22.5 (72.5)	20.8 (69.4)	23.0 (73.4)	26.0 (78.8)	26.9 (80.4)	29.4 (84.9)	30.8 (87.4)	34.1 (93.4)
Mean daily maximum °C (°F)	25.0 (77.0)	25.2 (77.4)	23.6 (74.5)	21.3 (70.3)	18.9 (66.0)	16.6 (61.9)	16.0 (60.8)	16.4 (61.5)	17.7 (63.9)	19.3 (66.7)	21.1 (70.0)	23.3 (73.9)	20.4 (68.7)
Daily mean °C (°F)	19.6 (67.3)	19.9 (67.8)	18.4 (65.1)	16.2 (61.2)	14.2 (57.6)	12.1 (53.8)	11.3 (52.3)	11.7 (53.1)	12.9 (55.2)	14.3 (57.7)	16.0 (60.8)	18.0 (64.4)	15.4 (59.7)
Mean daily minimum °C (°F)	14.2 (57.6)	14.6 (58.3)	13.2 (55.8)	11.1 (52.0)	9.5 (49.1)	7.6 (45.7)	6.6 (43.9)	7.0 (44.6)	8.1 (46.6)	9.3 (48.7)	10.9 (51.6)	12.7 (54.9)	10.4 (50.7)
Record low °C (°F)	7.1 (44.8)	7.1 (44.8)	4.2 (39.6)	3.7 (38.7)	0.6 (33.1)	−0.4 (31.3)	−2.0 (28.4)	−1.6 (29.1)	0.6 (33.1)	2.5 (36.5)	2.2 (36.0)	5.6 (42.1)	−2.0 (28.4)
Average rainfall mm (inches)	95.6 (3.76)	115.9 (4.56)	143.6 (5.65)	130.8 (5.15)	125.7 (4.95)	190.1 (7.48)	150.3 (5.92)	150.7 (5.93)	130.2 (5.13)	130.2 (5.13)	83.7 (3.30)	93.6 (3.69)	1,540.4 (60.65)
Mean monthly sunshine hours	235.0	201.7	168.2	164.3	153.2	131.8	141.2	152.3	170.5	197.7	206.3	264.8	2,187
Source: NIWA (Rainfall 1971-2000)

== Demographics ==
The Whangārei urban area covers 63.53 km^{2} (24.53 sq mi) and had an estimated population of 56,100 as of June 2025, with a population density of 883 people per km^{2}.

Historical population for Whangārei urban area
Year	Pop.	±% p.a.
2013	44,730	—
2018	51,894	+3.02%
2023	53,841	+0.74%

The urban area had a population of 53,841 in the 2023 New Zealand census, an increase of 1,947 people (3.8%) since the 2018 census, and an increase of 9,111 people (20.4%) since the 2013 census. There were 25,776 males, 27,918 females and 147 people of other genders in 19,821 dwellings. 3.0% of people identified as LGBTIQ+. The median age was 38.2 years (compared with 38.1 years nationally). There were 11,022 people (20.5%) aged under 15 years, 9,714 (18.0%) aged 15 to 29, 22,353 (41.5%) aged 30 to 64, and 10,752 (20.0%) aged 65 or older.

People could identify as more than one ethnicity. The results were 68.5% European (Pākehā); 37.3% Māori; 5.6% Pasifika; 8.9% Asian; 0.8% Middle Eastern, Latin American and African New Zealanders (MELAA); and 2.0% other, which includes people giving their ethnicity as "New Zealander". English was spoken by 96.3%, Māori language by 9.6%, Samoan by 0.4% and other languages by 9.6%. No language could be spoken by 2.3% (e.g. too young to talk). New Zealand Sign Language was known by 0.7%. The percentage of people born overseas was 19.2, compared with 28.8% nationally.

Religious affiliations were 32.9% Christian, 1.4% Hindu, 0.4% Islam, 3.5% Māori religious beliefs, 0.6% Buddhist, 0.5% New Age, 0.1% Jewish, and 1.5% other religions. People who answered that they had no religion were 51.6%, and 7.6% of people did not answer the census question.

Of those at least 15 years old, 5,895 (13.8%) people had a bachelor's or higher degree, 23,538 (55.0%) had a post-high school certificate or diploma, and 11,589 (27.1%) people exclusively held high school qualifications. The median income was $35,300, compared with $41,500 nationally. 2,832 people (6.6%) earned over $100,000 compared to 12.1% nationally. The employment status of those at least 15 was that 19,677 (46.0%) people were employed full-time, 5,100 (11.9%) were part-time, and 1,500 (3.5%) were unemployed.

== Government ==
=== National ===
Whangārei is within the Whangārei electorate and the Te Tai Tokerau Māori electorate. The current MP of the Whangārei electorate is Shane Reti of the National Party. The current MP of the Te Tai Tokerau electorate is Mariameno Kapa-Kingi of Te Pāti Māori.

=== Local ===
At a local level, Whangārei comes under the Northland Regional Council, of which the city is the seat.

Whangārei is governed locally by the Whangarei District Council. The city is split into two of the council wards, Denby, which takes the northern suburbs, and Okara, which takes the southern half of the city.

Whangārei is covered by the Northland Police District, which is split into two areas, Whangārei/Kaipara and Mid/Far North.

Judicially, the town is served by the Whangarei District Court and is also the base of the region's only High Court.

== Transport ==
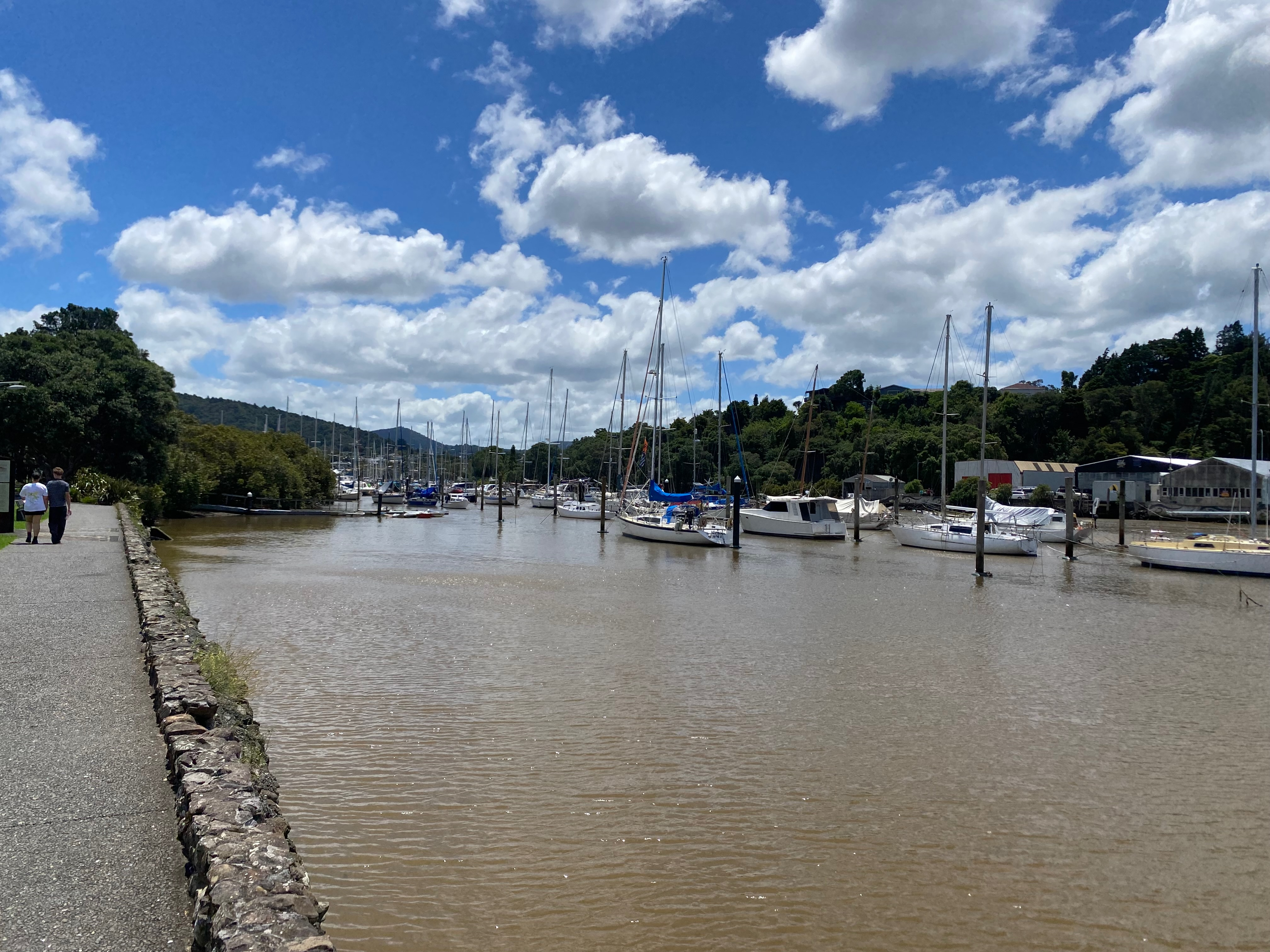
Walking the Hātea River Loop

State Highway 1 from Auckland to Cape Reinga passes through Whangārei. State Highway 14 from Dargaville connects to State Highway 1 in Whangārei. Opened in July 2013, the Te Matau ā Pohe, a bascule bridge, became second road crossing of the Hātea River.

There are several cycle/walk ways under development connecting the city centre with the outer suburbs. These include Kamo (completed), Onerahi (completed) and Raumanga/Maunu (several sections completed). The Hātea Loop (Huarahi o te Whai) is a central mixed space walkway connecting the Town Basin, Hīhīaua Peninsula, Okara, Pohe Island and Riverside areas of the central city.

Whangārei is served by Northport, a seaport at Marsden Point. It was previously served by Port Whangārei, in the upper harbour near the city, which was operated by the Northland Harbour Board until 1988, when it was transferred to the Northland Port Corporation. The first two berths at Marsden Point opened in 2002, and Port Whangārei closed to commercial shipping in 2007 when the remaining cargo operations were transferred to Marsden Point.

=== Air ===
Whangarei Airport is located 7.4 kilometres (4.6 mi) southeast of the city centre, in the suburb of Onerahi. It has the shortest runway of any commercial airport in New Zealand. As a result, the only aircraft in the Air New Zealand fleet which can serve the airport are De Havilland Q300 Dash 8 aircraft. These are the oldest aircraft in the fleet, with an average age of 19 years as of 2026. These aircraft are due to be phased out and replaced by the ATR 72-600, which require a longer runway. Since the runway at the current airport cannot be lengthened, Whangarei District Council commenced an airport location study in 2014. In 2022, it found a site in Ruatangata which would be most suitable, but no formal decision had been made.

=== Bus ===
Northland Regional Council organises the CityLink bus service. This bus service runs eight urban bus routes, with bicycle racks from 1 October 2018. On 20 November 2019, Whangārei became the first city in New Zealand to use Bee Cards. Only 2% of arrivals and 3% of departures in the Whangārei Central census area were by public bus in 2018. In other neighbouring census areas, even fewer used buses.

Intercity operates 3 buses a day from Whangārei, taking about 3 hours for the 158 km (98 mi) to Auckland and 1hr 45 mins to Kerikeri.

=== Railway ===
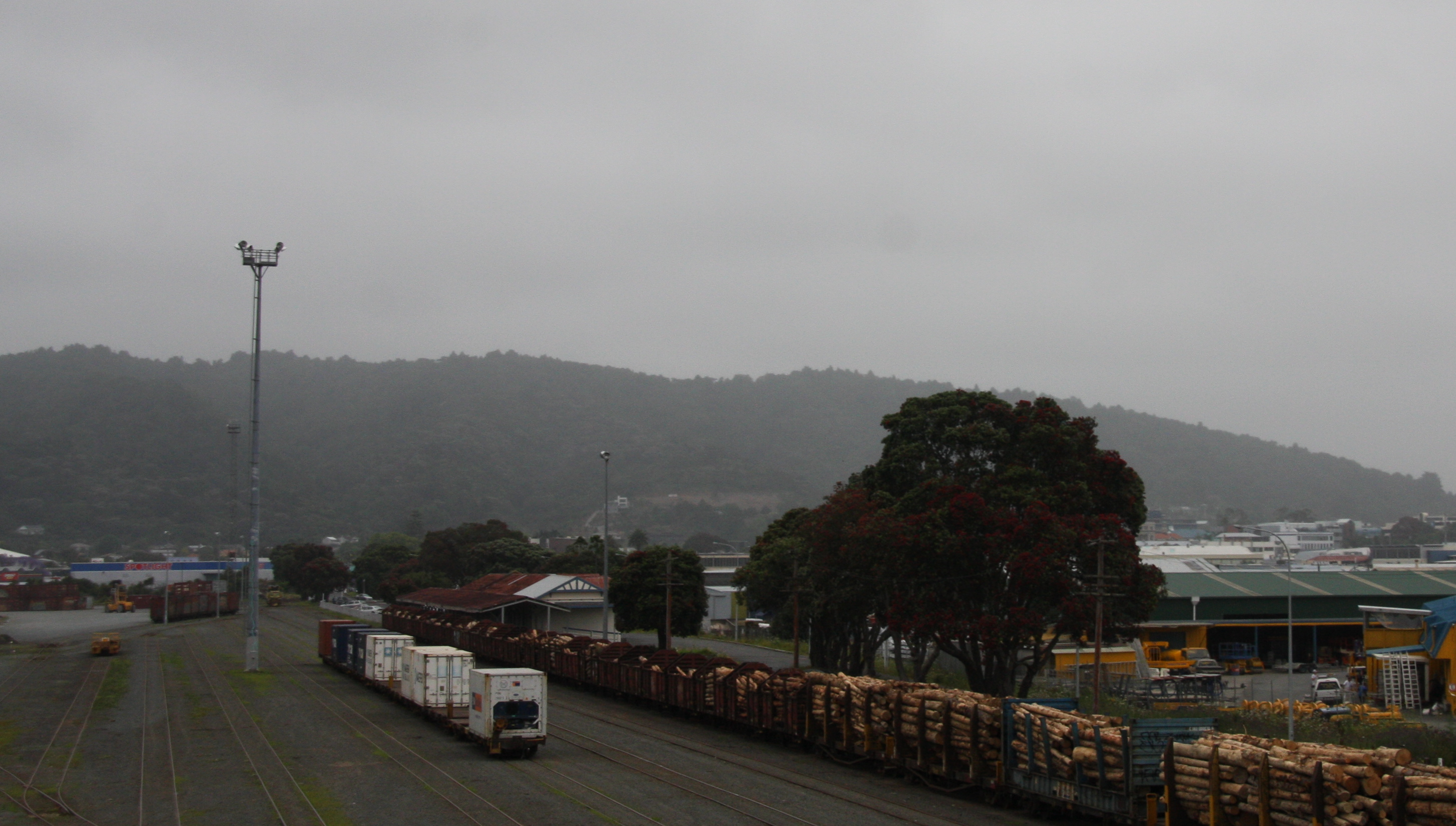
View of Whangārei railway yard from Porowini Ave in 2012

Whangārei is connected to Auckland and Otiria by the North Auckland line, which carries freight only, the container transfer depot being at 33 Porowini Ave. From 1911 to 1933 it was also on the Onerahi Branch.

==== Station ====
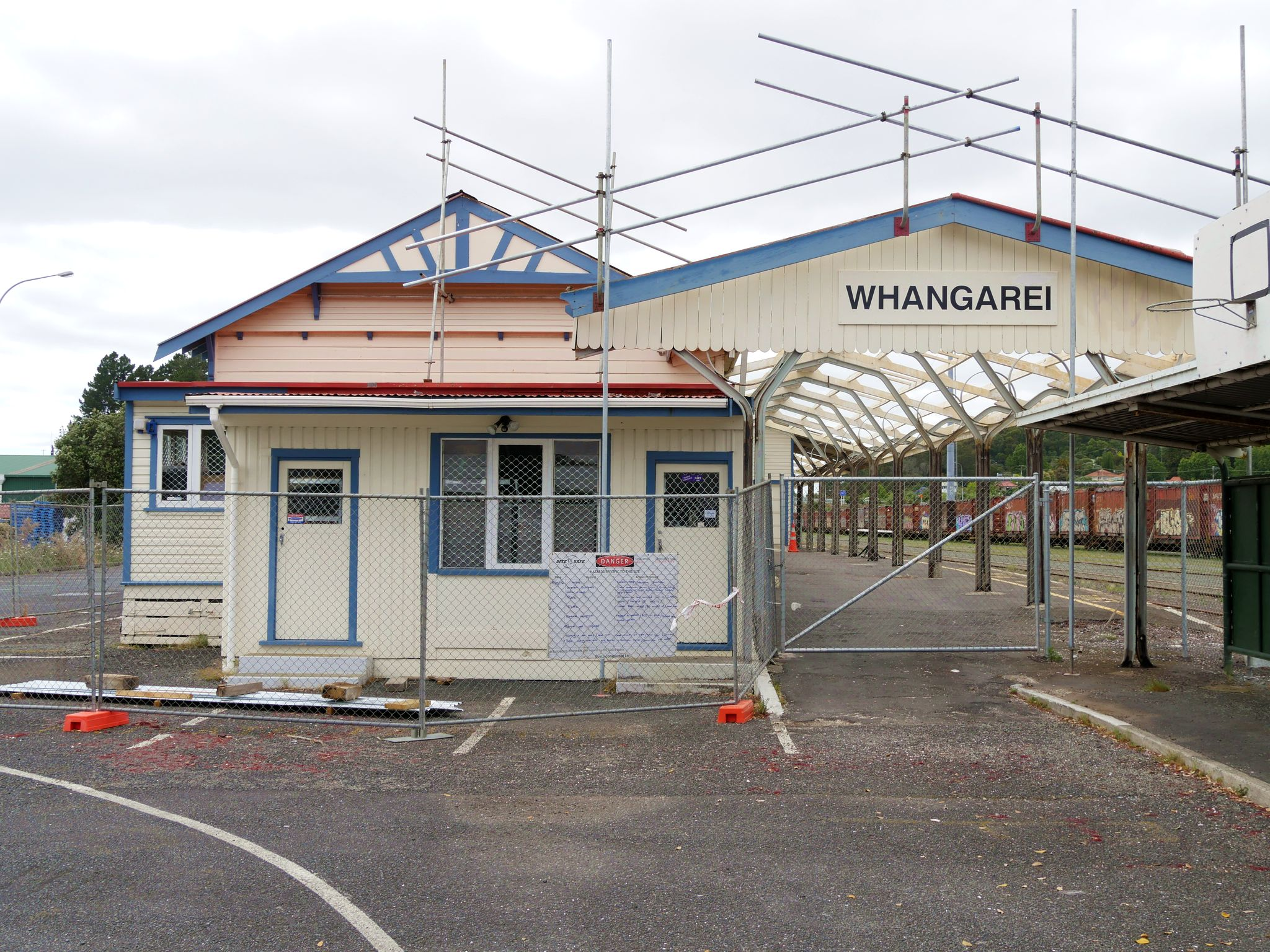
Whangārei railway station in 2017

The railway station lost its last scheduled passenger service on 15 September 1975, although a "with-car" (goods train with a carriage attached) service lasted until June 1976.

Restoration of the station by its Men's Shed occupant began in 2014 and was largely complete by 2020. Its Type C design was protected by a NZHPT Category II listing on 24 March 2006 (List Number 7646). The station was opened by the Minister for Railways, Gordon Coates, on 11 March 1925. Predecessor stations had been opened in 1880 and 1903. The 1880 station was about 500 m (1,600 ft) to the north, near Walton Street. The station was enlarged and a refreshment room added in 1912.

In 1929, the fastest train took 6 hrs 14 mins from Whangārei to Auckland. From 1956, railcars reduced the journey to 4hrs 10 mins. In 1943, the distance was measured as 129 mi 31 ch (208.2 km).

== Arts and culture ==
The Whangārei Art Museum is located in the Town Basin. Artisan markets are held at the nearby Canopy Bridge.

The Hundertwasser Art Centre was built on the site of the former Northland Harbour Board building.

The Quarry Arts Centre is located on the edge of the Western Hills in the Avenues.

The Hātea Loop walkway is an accessible, circular walkway which connects Town Basin, William Fraser Memorial Park, Te Matau ā Pohe, Canopy Bridge, Clapham's Clocks and Reyburn House gallery. The walkway offers marina views and various family friendly outdoor activities.

The Whangārei Theatre Company (formerly WOADS) has been staging theatre productions in Whangārei since 1946. They have currently made their home at the Riverbank Centre in the town basin.

Disruptive Performers (Theatre Group) was formed in 2019, and they staged their first production in November 2020.

Whangārei is home to many music organisations, such as Whangārei Youth Music, the Northland Sinfonia, and Sistema Whangārei.

== Education ==
=== Tertiary education ===
NorthTec, with its main campus located in the Whangārei suburb of Raumanga, is the chief provider of tertiary education in the Northland Region. It offers degrees, diplomas and certificates in a wide variety of academic, professional and technical fields. The degrees are nationally monitored for quality and so can lead to postgraduate study at universities and other institutions. NorthTec has around 23,000 students studying either part-time or full-time.

The University of Auckland maintains a campus in the city centre. There are also a number of private tertiary educational organisations that provide technical and vocational training.

=== Schools ===
There are several schools which offer secondary schooling education within the urban area. Most suburbs have their own primary school.

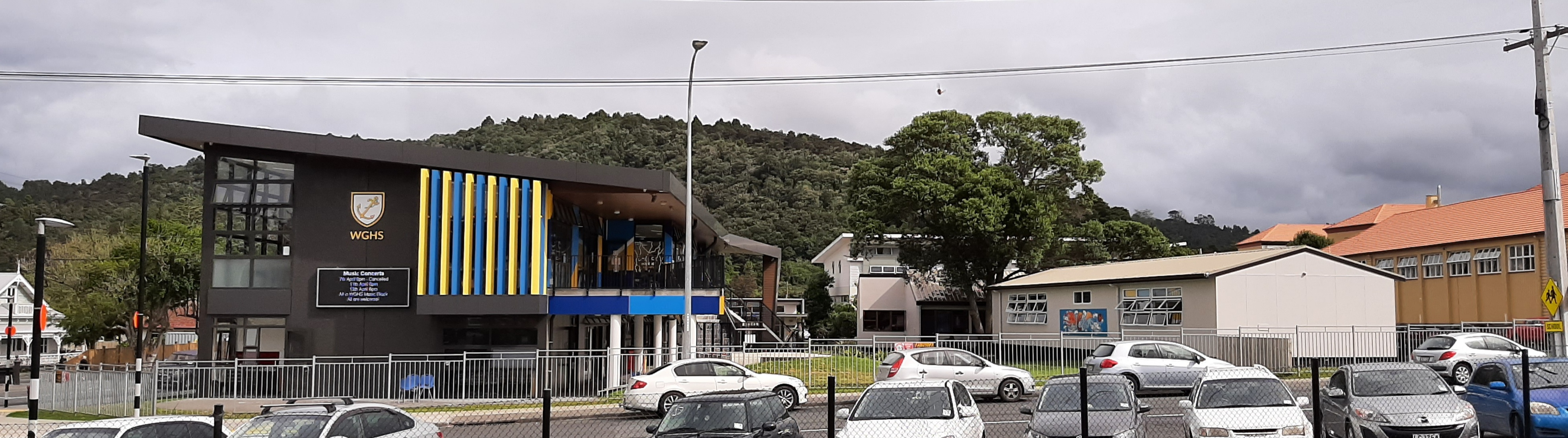
Whangārei Girls' High School

==== Secondary schools ====
- Whangārei Boys' High School, a boys' secondary school with a roll of 1,442 (July 2026).
- Whangārei Girls' High School, a girls' secondary school with a roll of 1,522 (July 2026).

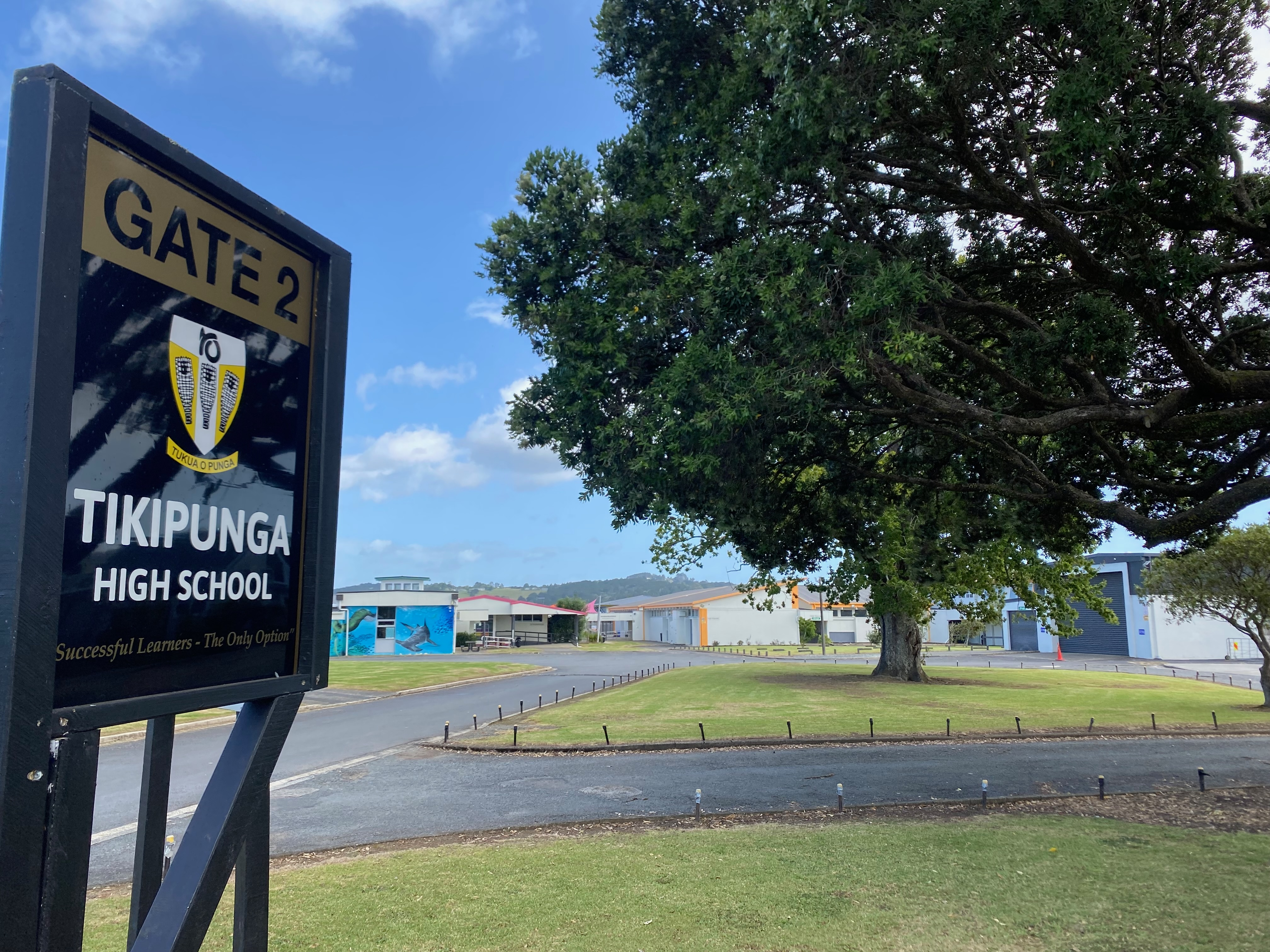
Tikipunga High School

These two secondary schools have a decile rating of 5 and cover years 9–13. Both schools opened in 1881.

- Kamo High School, which accommodates years 9–13.
- Tikipunga High School, which caters for years 7–13.

Both of these are co-educational secondary schools serving the northern suburbs.

- Huanui College, a private secondary school just out of the urban area in Glenbervie.
- Te Kura Kaupapa Māori o Te Rāwhitiroa. A Māori language immersion school catering for primary and secondary students.
- Pompallier Catholic College, a catholic semi-private secondary school located slightly west of Whangārei in Maunu.

==== Intermediate and primary schools ====
There are two intermediate schools (years 7–8) in the urban area. Several primary schools offer education from years 1–8.

- Whangārei Intermediate is an intermediate (years 7–8) school with a roll of 639.
- Kamo Intermediate is a popular intermediate school serving the northern suburbs.

Primary schools in the urban area include Hurupaki School, Kamo Primary School, Totara Grove School (formerly Kamo East School), Tikipunga Primary School, Otangarei School, Whau Valley School, Whangārei School, a contributing primary (years 1–6) school with a roll of 577, Maunu School, Horahora School, Morningside School, Manaia View School (formerly Raumanga Primary and Raumanga Middle schools, amalgamated), Raurimu Avenue School, and Onerahi School.

==== Religious and state-integrated schools ====
Pompallier Catholic College (opened in 1971) is a Catholic state integrated co-educational secondary school (years 7 to 13) with a roll of 560 and a decile ranking of 7, located in the suburb of Maunu. It is the only Catholic secondary school in Northland serving the wider district.

Saint Francis Xavier Catholic School, the city's Catholic primary school, located in the suburb of Whau Valley adjacent to the Catholic Parish.

Christian Renewal School is a composite state integrated co-educational secondary and primary (years 1–13) school with a roll of 201. Around 110 of those students are in high school (years 9–13), as of June 2018. The school was established in 1993 and integrated into the state system in 1997. The secondary half of the school is situated upstairs, and the primary downstairs. The school operates in the Christian Renewal buildings, beside the Renew Church work buildings and auditorium.

Excellere College, a Christian school (years 1–13) located in the northern suburb of Springs Flat. One half of the school is secondary, and the other half is primary. There are 205 students at this school.

The Whangārei Adventist Christian School, located at Whau Valley Road, has been operating for some 50 years and is the second oldest of the independent Christian schools in Whangārei as well. It was formerly called the Whangārei Seventhday Adventist School. Over 30 students attend the school, as of June 2018.

==== Special school ====
Blomfield Special School and Resource Centre provides education and care to students between the ages of five and twenty-one years, and has a roll of 68. The school operates from five locations, four in Whangārei and one in Kaitaia.

== Infrastructure and services ==
=== Healthcare ===
Whangārei is within the Northland District Health Board. The single primary health care organisation (PHO), Te Kaupapa Mahitahi Hauora Papa O Te Raki Trust, commonly known as Mahitahi Hauora, was created in 2019 through a process of coming together with the previous Northland PHOs. Whangārei Hospital (formerly Northland Base Hospital) is Northland DHB's largest and provides secondary specialist care to all of Northland. It has 246 inpatient beds, and is based in the suburb of Horahora.

Mercy Hospital was established in 1963 by the Sisters of Mercy.

Kensington Hospital, opened in March 2001, is a private healthcare facility.

=== Utilities ===
Northpower owns and operates the local electricity distribution network servicing the city, with electricity supplied from Transpower's national grid at the Maungatapere substation southwest of the city. There is very little generation in Northland and Auckland, so most of the city's electricity is transmitted from the Waikato.

Natural gas arrived in Whangārei in 1983, with the completion of the high-pressure pipeline north from Auckland to the city, now operated by First Gas. First Gas also operates the gas distribution network within the city.

== Sports ==
Whangārei is home to the Northland rugby union team, a professional side competing in the Bunnings NPC, the highest level of provincial rugby in New Zealand. They play out of Okara Park (currently known as "Semenoff Stadium" due to a sponsorship agreement), the largest stadium in the region, which also hosted two matches during Rugby World Cup 2011. The city also hosted a match on 3 June between a Provincial XV team (NZ Provincial Barbarians) and the British and Irish Lions during their 2017 tour.

Cobham Oval has hosted Black Caps one-day international cricket matches, with the first taking place in 2012.

The football (soccer) club North Force who compete in the Lotto Sport Italia NRFL Division 1 are based in Whangārei.

Whangārei has a field hockey facility that hosted several international matches. Several hockey players from Northland have been selected for the Black Sticks Women since 2000.

Whangārei is home to the northernmost parkrun in New Zealand. This is a free, weekly, timed 5 km (3 mile), held every Saturday at 8am. The start and finish is under Te Matau o Pohe bridge.

The International Rally of Whangārei is based in the region with competitors from Australia, India, China, Japan, South East Asia and Pacific Islands racing on dirt roads in the districts surrounding Whangārei. It is the season opening event for both the Asia-Pacific Rally Championship and the New Zealand Rally Championship and is New Zealand's second-largest international motorsport competition, second only to the world championship event, Rally New Zealand. Whangārei Speedway attracts drivers from outside the Northland Region.

Northland is also represented at the highest national domestic level in golf.

The Northland rugby league team, representing the Northland Region in New Zealand Rugby League competitions, is based in Whangārei. They currently compete in the Albert Baskerville Trophy as the Northern Swords. Between 2006 and 2007 they were part of the Bartercard Cup, playing under the name the Northern Storm. Northland was originally known as North Auckland and has previously used the nickname the Wild Boars.

== See also ==
- Northland Emergency Services Trust (NEST)
