= Whangārei Falls =

- Otuihau (Māori)
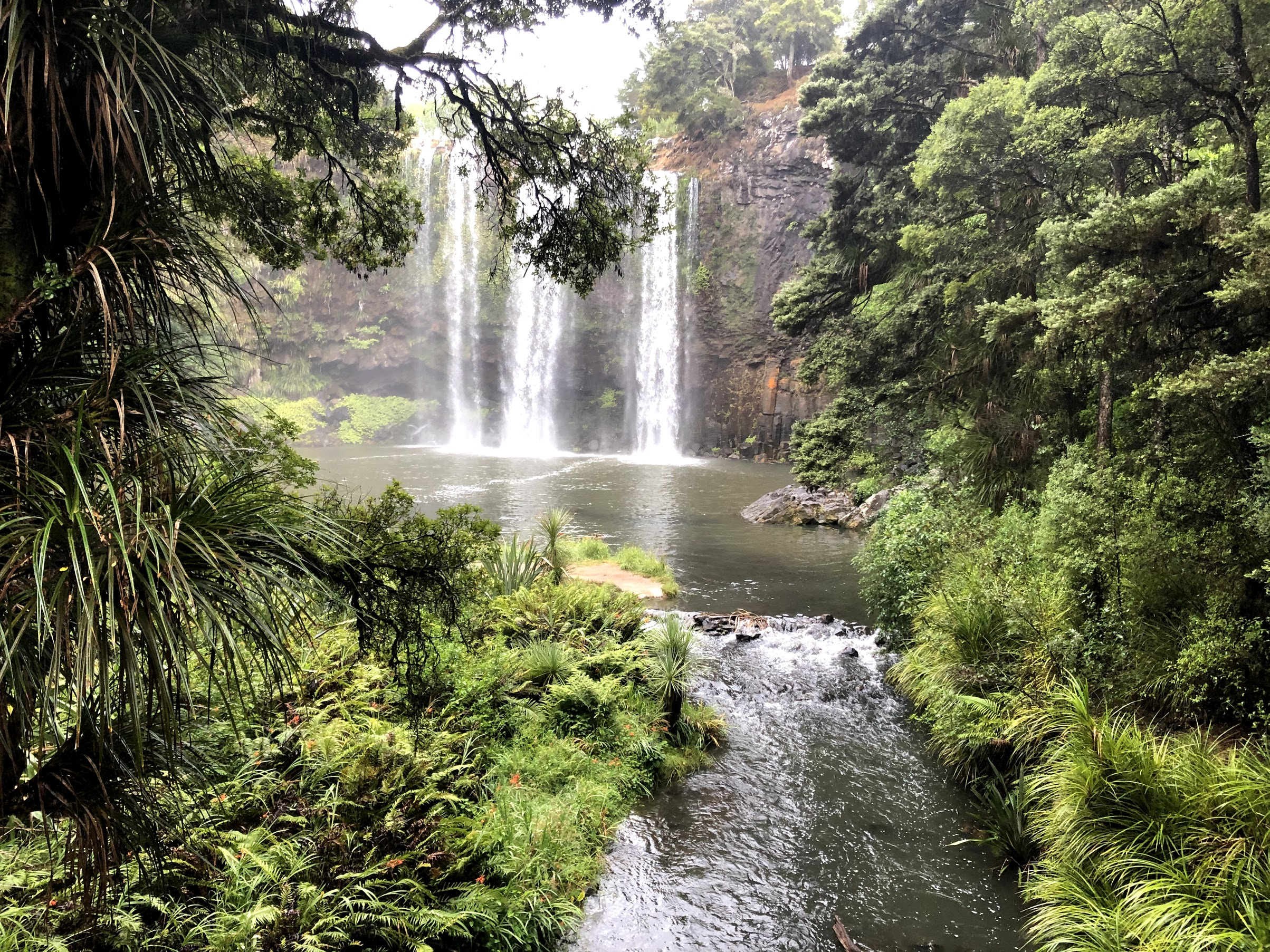
- Whangārei Falls summer 2020
- Location: 35.684°S 174.336°E
- Type: Plunge
- Elevation: 60 metres (200 ft)
- Total height: 26 metres (85 ft)
- Number of drops: 1
- Watercourse: Hātea River

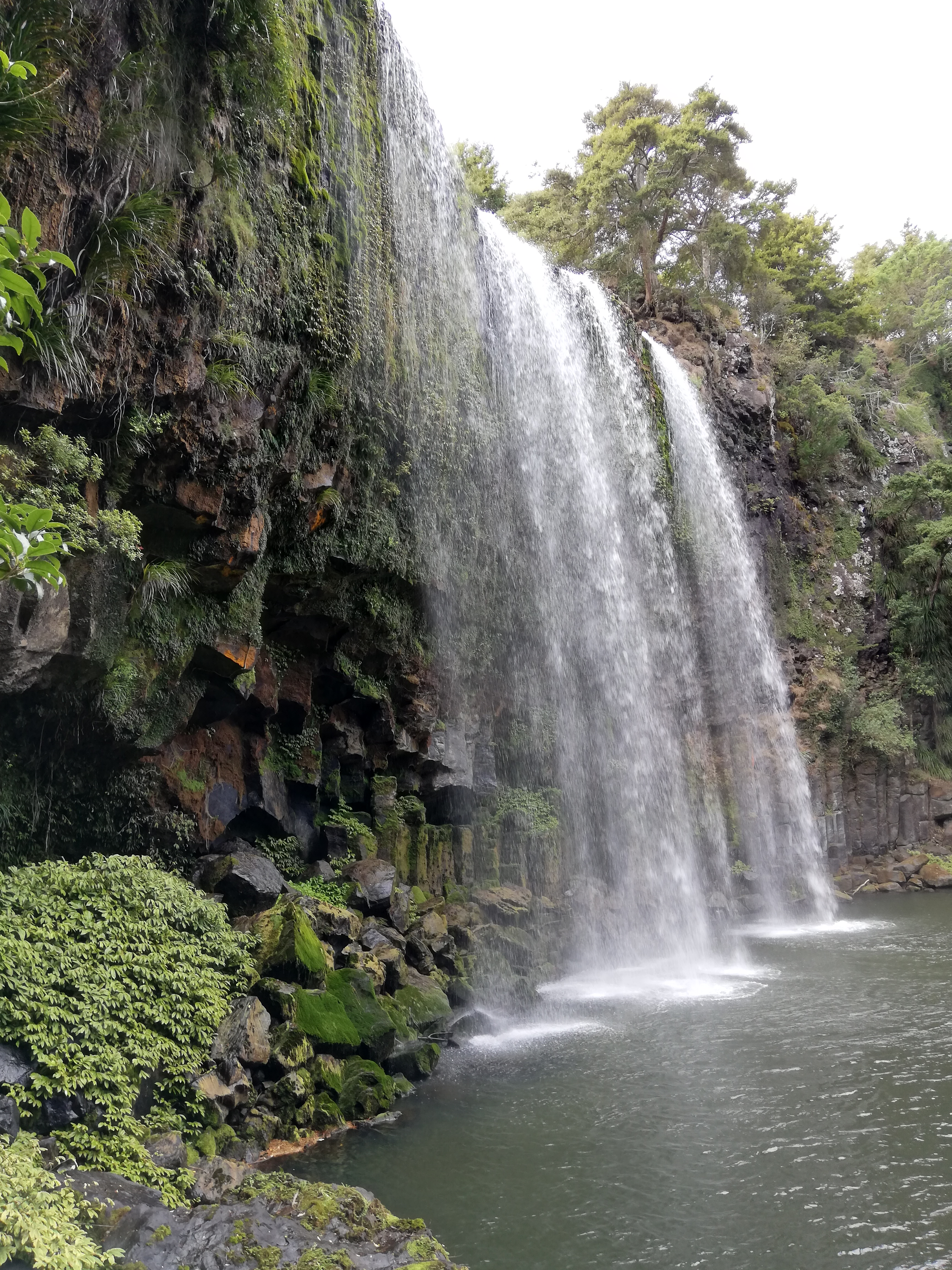
Whangārei Falls

Whangārei Falls (Māori: Otuihau) is located just on the outskirts of Whangārei on Boundary Road in the suburb of Tikipunga, a popular place for both locals and tourists to visit, go for walks along the edge of the Hātea River, or to have a picnic on the lawns and tables at the top of the waterfall near the main car park.

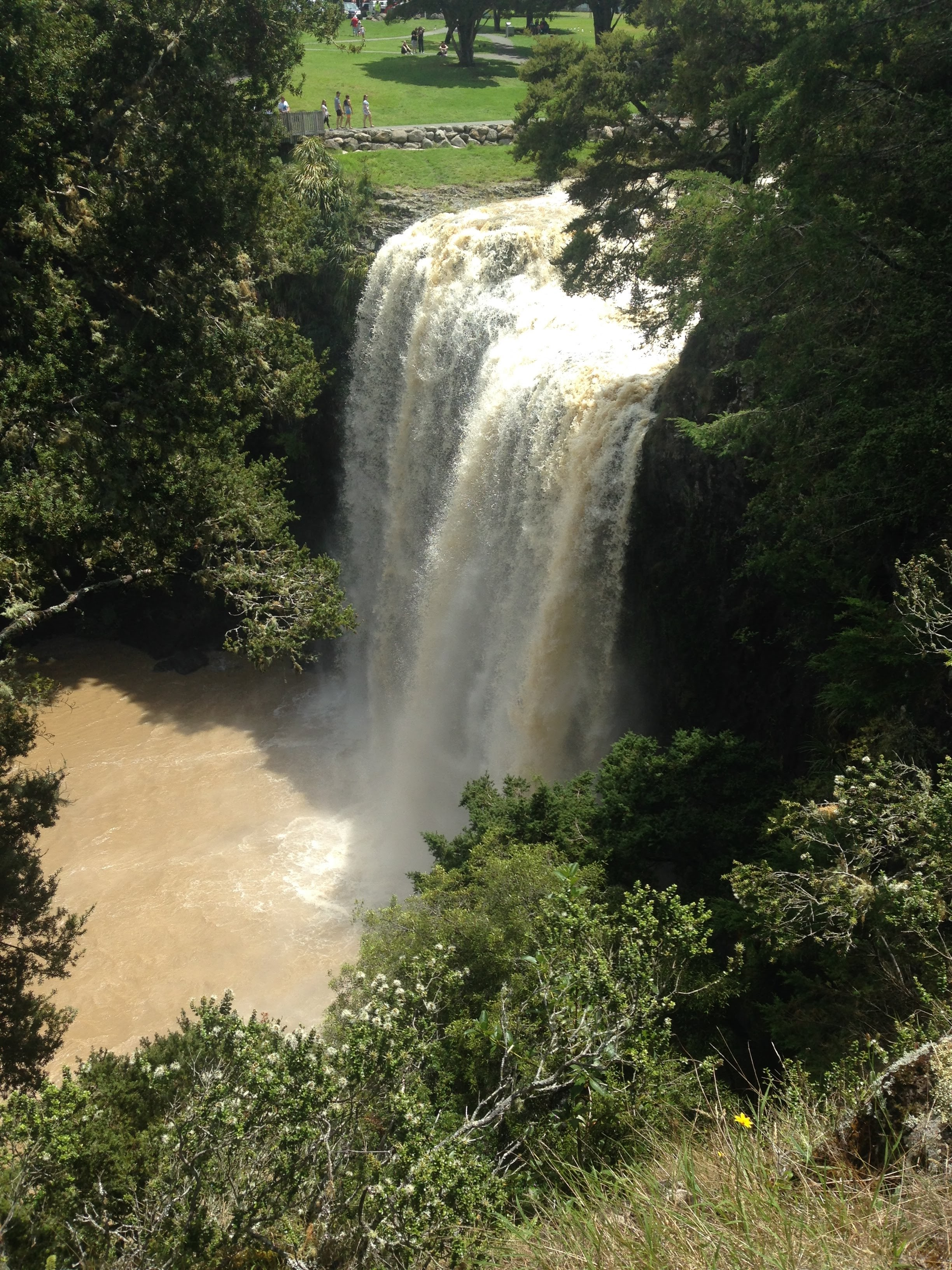
The falls after heavy rain.

The Hātea River drops 26 metres (85 ft) over a basalt lava flow. There are many gravel and dirt walkways through the native bush, around the falls and alongside the river, the full walking track to A. H. Reed park and back to the falls in a loop is about one hour.

The falls were originally known as Otuihau, and have been a common picnic spot since at least the 1890s. In the 1920s, the land was bought by Archibald Clapham, who donated around four hundred clocks to a clock museum that became Clapham's Clocks. He bought the land to prevent commercial exploitation of the falls. The Whangarei Businessmen's Association raised funds in 1946 to buy the land on behalf of the citizens of Whangārei and turned it into a public park.

== See also ==
- List of waterfalls
- List of waterfalls in New Zealand
