= Te Kamo =

- Suburb
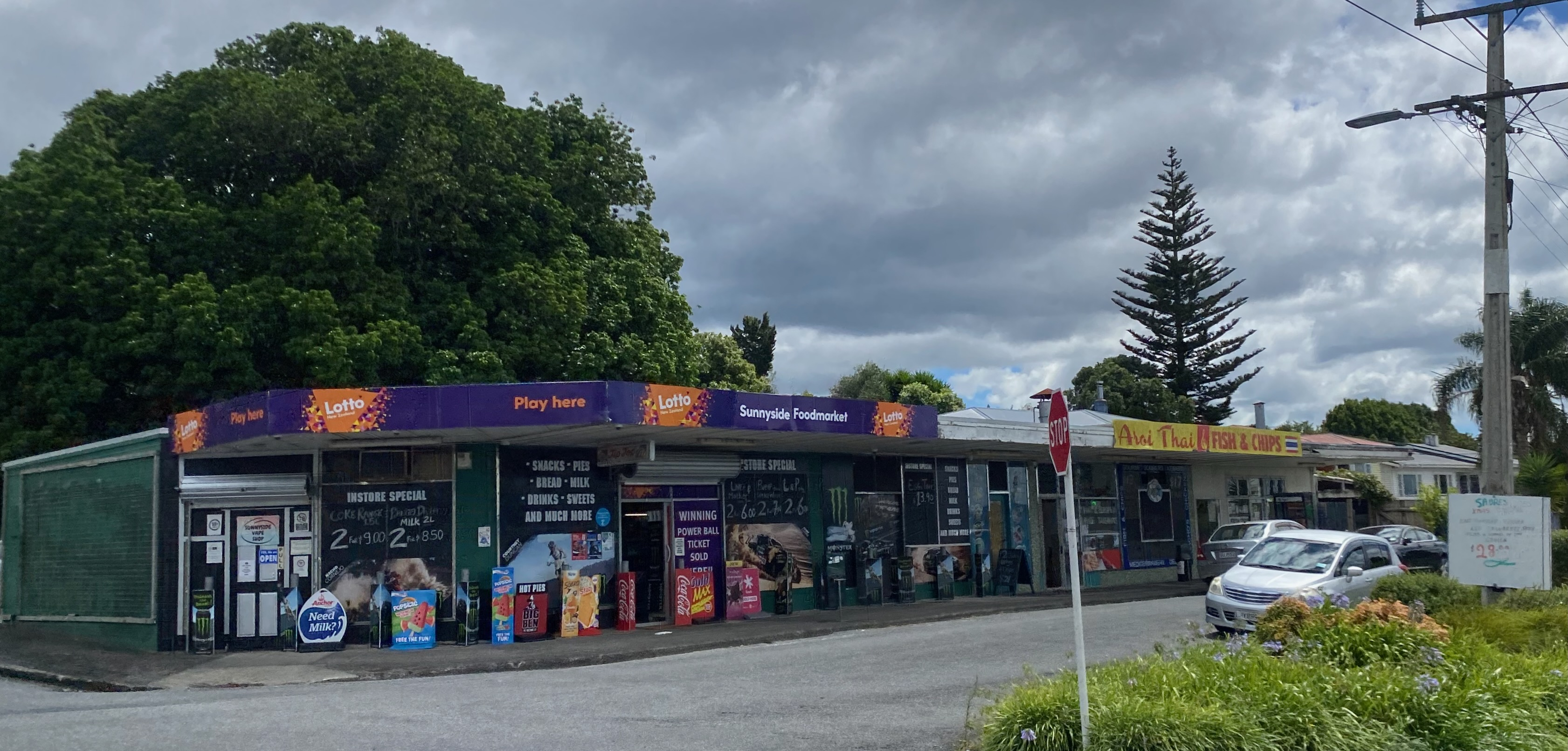
- Interactive map of Te Kamo
- Coordinates: 35.6835122°S 174.3135908°E
- Country: New Zealand
- City: Whangārei
- Local authority: Whangarei District Council
- Electoral ward: Whangārei Urban Ward

Area
  - Land: 1,209 ha (2,990 acres)

Population (June 2025)
  - Total: 10,970
  - Density: 907.4/km^{2} (2,350/sq mi)
- Postcode(s): 0112, 0185

| | Kauri, Springs Flat |
| Three Mile Bush | Te Kamo | Tikipunga, Totara Parklands |
| | Whau Valley | Otangarei |

Te Kamo, also known as Kamo, is a northern suburb of the New Zealand city of Whangārei. The town's name was legally changed to Te Kamo in 2023, restoring a name that had been used historically for the area in the early years of European settlement. It is approximately five minutes' drive from the centre of Whangārei. There was coal mining in the area between 1875 and 1955, and it was known for its hot springs in the early years of the 20th century.

== Etymology ==
According to the oral traditions of the local Māori hapū (sub-tribe), Ngāti Kahu-o-Torongare, Te Kamo was an ancestor who resided in the now-eponymous area and the wider region. Considered an introvert, Te Kamo worked in the background to ensure the prosperity and safety of his people, including organising trade with other hapū from coastal areas. The name of the area was recorded as Te Kamo in some documents from the early years of European settlement, but it was subsequently unofficially shortened to Kamo, and the longer name faded from use – becoming largely unknown among the local residents.

In 2023, the name of the suburb was officially changed to Te Kamo by the New Zealand Geographic Board, in order to acknowledge the historical heritage, although the change was unpopular with the local residents. Of the responses submitted about the proposed name change, 535 had objected to the change and only 116 supported it at the time.

== History ==
Radiocarbon dating of a midden near the Otangarei Stream gives a mid-15th century date for the start of Māori occupation of the area.

In 1839 William Carruth recorded a Maori village in the western part of Kamo. Carruth recorded that a village known as Ketinikau was cultivating potato, sweet potato, maize, and gourds using wooden tools.

Gilbert Mair purchased a 1,800 ha (4,400 acres) land purchase in 1839 that included the 119 ha (290 acres) Te Kamo Block. Mair's claim was challenged by the Old Land Claims Commission in 1844 and was his purchase was reduced in size. In 1858 the Crown purchased the Te Kamo Block for £50.

Coal mining was an early industry in the area. Tunnelling first started in 1875, but it was not practical to carry the coal over the unmetalled roads to Whangārei wharf. In 1882 a short railway line was completed between Kamo and Whangārei to carry the coal. This was one of Northland's first railways. The railway still exists as part of the North Auckland Line. The mine closed in 1955, with the seams worked out. Limonite was also quarried at Kamo.

A Wesleyan church was built in 1881, the Anglican All Saints Church in 1886, and a Presbyterian church in 1911. The first Roman Catholic church in the Whangārei area opened in Kamo about 1881.

Kamo became a Town District in 1884, at which point it had a population of 410, slightly smaller than Whangārei.

The town was known for its hot springs in the early 20th century, although several people died of suffocation in covered baths between 1901 and 1920. The iron-rich water was promoted as a health tonic.

In the early 1960s the boundaries of Whangārei city expanded to include Kamo.

== Geography ==
Parakiore is a volcanic dome rising to a height of 391 metres (1,283 ft) to the northwest of Kamo. It is about one million years old, and part of the Harbour Fault which also includes the peaks Hikurangi near Hikurangi, and Parihaka in Whangārei.

Kamo has volcanic soils, which led to it being a site of Maori agriculture and occupation. These soils do not extend east of the Otangarei Stream, which have a dearth of archaeological features.

== Demographics ==
Kamo covers 12.09 km^{2} (4.67 sq mi) and had an estimated population of 10,970 as of June 2025, with a population density of 907 people per km^{2}.

Historical population
| Year | Pop. | ±% p.a. |
|---|---|---|
| 2006 | 7,476 | — |
| 2013 | 8,808 | +2.37% |
| 2018 | 10,164 | +2.91% |
| 2023 | 10,734 | +1.10% |
The 2006 population is for a smaller area of 8.68 km^{2} Source:

Kamo had a population of 10,734 in the 2023 New Zealand census, an increase of 570 people (5.6%) since the 2018 census, and an increase of 1,926 people (21.9%) since the 2013 census. There were 5,133 males, 5,568 females and 33 people of other genders in 3,846 dwellings. 2.6% of people identified as LGBTIQ+. The median age was 38.5 years (compared with 38.1 years nationally). There were 2,268 people (21.1%) aged under 15 years, 1,908 (17.8%) aged 15 to 29, 4,302 (40.1%) aged 30 to 64, and 2,256 (21.0%) aged 65 or older.

People could identify as more than one ethnicity. The results were 76.5% European (Pākehā); 31.3% Māori; 4.5% Pasifika; 7.5% Asian; 0.6% Middle Eastern, Latin American and African New Zealanders (MELAA); and 2.0% other, which includes people giving their ethnicity as "New Zealander". English was spoken by 96.7%, Māori language by 6.9%, Samoan by 0.3%, and other languages by 8.9%. No language could be spoken by 2.2% (e.g. too young to talk). New Zealand Sign Language was known by 0.7%. The percentage of people born overseas was 18.3, compared with 28.8% nationally.

Religious affiliations were 33.8% Christian, 1.0% Hindu, 0.4% Islam, 2.1% Māori religious beliefs, 0.7% Buddhist, 0.4% New Age, 0.1% Jewish, and 1.2% other religions. People who answered that they had no religion were 53.0%, and 7.5% of people did not answer the census question.

Of those at least 15 years old, 1,164 (13.7%) people had a bachelor's or higher degree, 4,839 (57.2%) had a post-high school certificate or diploma, and 2,091 (24.7%) people exclusively held high school qualifications. The median income was $37,500, compared with $41,500 nationally. 666 people (7.9%) earned over $100,000 compared to 12.1% nationally. The employment status of those at least 15 was that 4,026 (47.6%) people were employed full-time, 1,023 (12.1%) were part-time, and 231 (2.7%) were unemployed.

Individual statistical areas
| Name | Area (km^{2}) | Population | Density (per km^{2}) | Dwellings | Median age | Median income |
|---|---|---|---|---|---|---|
| Kamo West | 4.50 | 2,103 | 467 | 759 | 44.8 years | $37,200 |
| Kamo East | 1.43 | 3,276 | 2,291 | 1,044 | 30.8 years | $39,500 |
| Granfield Reserve | 5.07 | 3,597 | 709 | 1,422 | 47.3 years | $34,800 |
| Kamo Central | 1.09 | 1,758 | 1,613 | 624 | 35.9 years | $39,200 |
| New Zealand | | | | | 38.1 years | $41,500 |

== Education ==
Te Kamo High School is a secondary (years 9–13) school with a roll of 799. The school was established in 1960.

Te Kamo Intermediate School is an intermediate (years 7–8) school with a roll of 618.

Te Kamo School, Totara Grove School and Hurupaki School are contributing primary (years 1–6) schools with rolls of 403, 278 and 326 respectively.

All these schools are coeducational. Rolls are as of July 2026. Totara Grove has a decile rating of 2. Hurupaki School has a decile of 8. The others all have a decile rating of 5.

Kamo Primary School opened in July 1873 in a private house. It had grown to 64 students by the time it moved into Kamo Public Hall in 1877. and it moved to its own building in 1881. In 1946, it moved to its present site. The older students were split to Kamo Intermediate in 1964. Kamo East School opened in 1966, and was later renamed to Totara Grove School.

== Notable people ==
- Rugby union All Blacks players Bunny Finlayson, Bevan Holmes and Ian Jones played for Kamo Rugby Club as did Auckland Blues player Justin Collins and Auckland Blues coach Peter Sloane.
- Olympic field hockey player Stacey Michelsen attended Kamo Intermediate School.
- Ross Ihaka, a statistician and co-originator of the R programming language, attended Kamo High School.
- Park Kyung, a rapper and composer from the South Korean boy group Block B, attended Kamo High School.
- Davina Duke, a Māori contemporary clay artist, worked as an art teacher at Kamo High School.

== See also ==
- Hurupaki Mountain, a mountain 1.5 kilometres from the township.
