= Whau Valley =

- Suburb
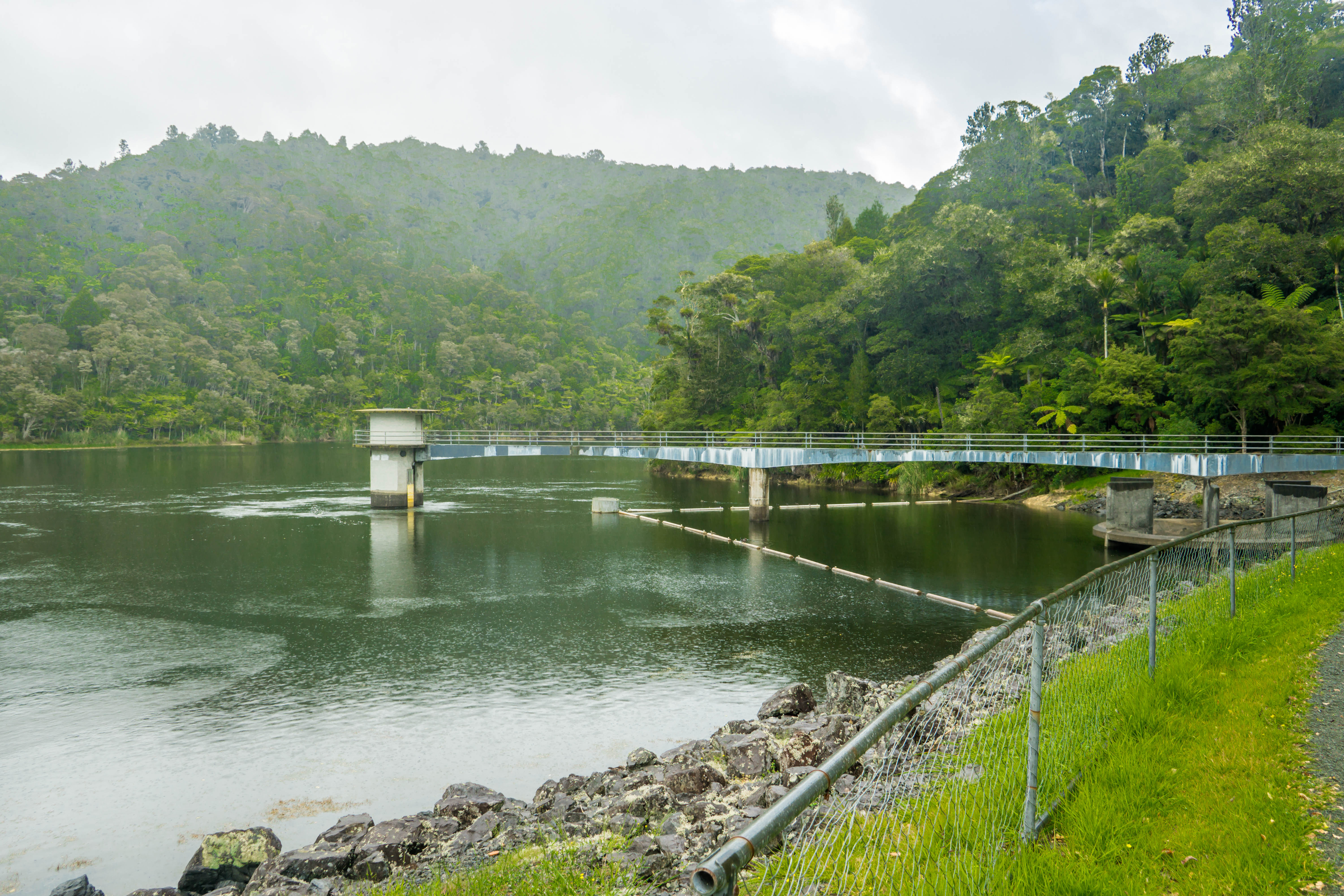
- Whau Valley earth dam
- Interactive map of Whau Valley
- Coordinates: 35°41′55″S 174°18′46″E
- Country: New Zealand
- City: Whangārei
- Local authority: Whangarei District Council
- Electoral ward: Whangārei Urban Ward

Area
  - Land: 718 ha (1,770 acres)

Population (June 2025)
  - Total: 2,850
  - Density: 397/km^{2} (1,030/sq mi)
- Postcode: 0112

	Kamo	Otangarei
	Whau Valley	Mairtown
(Pukenui Forest)	Regent	Kensington

Whau Valley is a suburb of Whangārei, in Northland Region, New Zealand. State Highway 1 runs through it. The valley was named for the whau trees which grew there in the 1850s.

At the end of the 4 km long Whau Valley Road is the principal water reservoir for Whangārei City, created by the Whau Valley Earth Dam. The reservoir is stocked with rainbow and brown trout.

== History ==
Some of the early settlers in what was then called Whauwhau Valley were William Hawken and his family, who arrived in 1859, and John MacDonald and his family, in 1860. The MacDonald family was part of the group of people from Nova Scotia who settled in the Whangārei area.

Coal was discovered in the Whauwhau Valley on 24 August 1864. Henry Walton and William Grahame took a 99-year lease on the land and developed a mine. A wooden tramway was built from the mine to the Hātea River so coal wagons could be pulled by horses to be loaded onto ships. The railway line between Kamo and Whangārei, opened in March 1881, replaced the tramway. Output of the mine was 45,359 long tons (46,087 t) by 1885.

== Demographics ==
Whau Valley covers 7.18 km^{2} (2.77 sq mi) and had an estimated population of 2,850 as of June 2025, with a population density of 397 people per km^{2}.

Historical population
Year	Pop.	±% p.a.
2006	2,601	—
2013	2,538	−0.35%
2018	2,799	+1.98%
2023	2,781	−0.13%

Whau Valley had a population of 2,781 in the 2023 New Zealand census, a decrease of 18 people (−0.6%) since the 2018 census, and an increase of 243 people (9.6%) since the 2013 census. There were 1,353 males, 1,425 females and 3 people of other genders in 1,035 dwellings. 3.0% of people identified as LGBTIQ+. The median age was 42.5 years (compared with 38.1 years nationally). There were 504 people (18.1%) aged under 15 years, 441 (15.9%) aged 15 to 29, 1,206 (43.4%) aged 30 to 64, and 630 (22.7%) aged 65 or older.

People could identify as more than one ethnicity. The results were 74.9% European (Pākehā); 28.4% Māori; 4.3% Pasifika; 8.3% Asian; 1.3% Middle Eastern, Latin American and African New Zealanders (MELAA); and 2.7% other, which includes people giving their ethnicity as "New Zealander". English was spoken by 95.9%, Māori language by 6.5%, Samoan by 0.2%, and other languages by 9.7%. No language could be spoken by 3.1% (e.g. too young to talk). New Zealand Sign Language was known by 0.5%. The percentage of people born overseas was 19.8, compared with 28.8% nationally.

Religious affiliations were 34.7% Christian, 1.4% Hindu, 0.3% Islam, 1.4% Māori religious beliefs, 0.4% Buddhist, 0.3% New Age, 0.1% Jewish, and 1.2% other religions. People who answered that they had no religion were 51.6%, and 8.7% of people did not answer the census question.

Of those at least 15 years old, 354 (15.5%) people had a bachelor's or higher degree, 1,218 (53.5%) had a post-high school certificate or diploma, and 597 (26.2%) people exclusively held high school qualifications. The median income was $36,500, compared with $41,500 nationally. 219 people (9.6%) earned over $100,000 compared to 12.1% nationally. The employment status of those at least 15 was that 1,098 (48.2%) people were employed full-time, 276 (12.1%) were part-time, and 48 (2.1%) were unemployed.

== Education ==
Whau Valley School is a contributing primary (years 1-6) school with a roll of 291 students as of March 2026.

St Francis Xavier School is a Catholic contributing primary (years 1-6) school with a roll of 450 students as of March 2026.

Whangarei Adventist Christian School is a full primary (years 1-8) school with a roll of 32 students as of March 2026.

All these schools are coeducational. St Francis Xavier and Whangarei Adventist schools are state integrated.
