= Kauri, New Zealand =

Kauri
- Interactive map of Kauri
- Coordinates: 35°38′47″S 174°17′44″E
- Country: New Zealand
- Region: Northland Region
- District: Whangarei District
- Ward: Hikurangi-Coastal Ward
- Electorates: Whangārei; Te Tai Tokerau

Government
  - Territorial Authority: Whangarei District Council
  - Regional council: Northland Regional Council
  - Mayor of Whangārei: Ken Couper
  - Whangārei MP: Shane Reti
  - Te Tai Tokerau MP: Mariameno Kapa-Kingi

Kauri is a locality in Northland, New Zealand. State Highway 1 passes through the area. Kamo is to the south, and Hikurangi is to the north. Mount Parakiore is a volcanic dome rising 391 metres (1,283 ft) to the southwest. It is about one million years old, and part of the Harbour Fault, which also includes Mount Hikurangi near Hikurangi, and Parahaki in Whangārei.

The area, initially called Kaurihohore, was settled by immigrants from Nova Scotia in 1856.

== Demographics ==
Kauri statistical area covers 56.01 km^{2} (21.63 sq mi) and had an estimated population of 1,920 as of June 2025, with a population density of 34 people per km^{2}.

Historical population
Year	Pop.	±% p.a.
2006	1,338	—
2013	1,488	+1.53%
2018	1,746	+3.25%
2023	1,866	+1.34%

Kauri had a population of 1,866 in the 2023 New Zealand census, an increase of 120 people (6.9%) since the 2018 census, and an increase of 378 people (25.4%) since the 2013 census. There were 924 males, 939 females and 3 people of other genders in 636 dwellings. 1.9% of people identified as LGBTIQ+. The median age was 46.3 years (compared with 38.1 years nationally). There were 357 people (19.1%) aged under 15 years, 273 (14.6%) aged 15 to 29, 858 (46.0%) aged 30 to 64, and 378 (20.3%) aged 65 or older.

People could identify as more than one ethnicity. The results were 89.4% European (Pākehā); 20.3% Māori; 3.2% Pasifika; 2.4% Asian; 1.3% Middle Eastern, Latin American and African New Zealanders (MELAA); and 1.8% other, which includes people giving their ethnicity as "New Zealander". English was spoken by 98.2%, Māori language by 3.5%, Samoan by 0.3%, and other languages by 5.9%. No language could be spoken by 1.3% (e.g. too young to talk). New Zealand Sign Language was known by 0.3%. The percentage of people born overseas was 16.4, compared with 28.8% nationally.

Religious affiliations were 29.4% Christian, 0.2% Hindu, 1.1% Māori religious beliefs, 0.3% Buddhist, 0.6% New Age, and 0.8% other religions. People who answered that they had no religion were 58.7%, and 8.7% of people did not answer the census question.

Of those at least 15 years old, 225 (14.9%) people had a bachelor's or higher degree, 900 (59.6%) had a post-high school certificate or diploma, and 315 (20.9%) people exclusively held high school qualifications. The median income was $41,000, compared with $41,500 nationally. 195 people (12.9%) earned over $100,000 compared to 12.1% nationally. The employment status of those at least 15 was that 765 (50.7%) people were employed full-time, 231 (15.3%) were part-time, and 21 (1.4%) were unemployed.

== Education ==
Kaurihohore School is a coeducational contributing primary school (years 1–6) school with a roll of 172 (March 2026). The school was built in 1877. It burned down in 1942 and was rebuilt, opening again in 1948. The school celebrated its 125th jubilee in 2002. The School's current principal Leslee Allen has been head of the school since 2001.
