= Hātea River =

Coordinates: 35°43′20″S 174°19′26″E

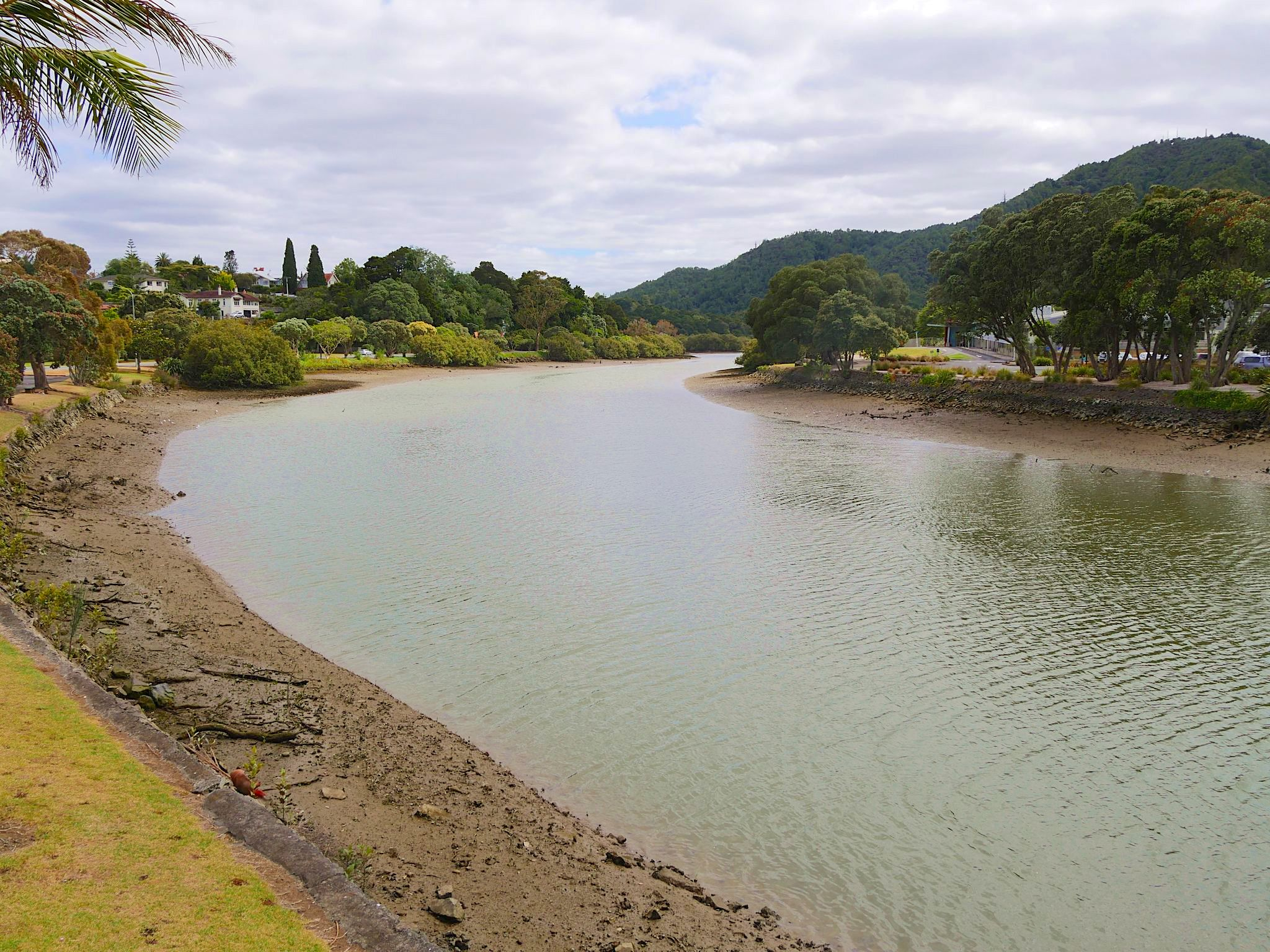

Location
- Country: New Zealand

Physical characteristics
- Source
  - location: Whangārei District
- Mouth
  - location: Whangārei Harbour

The Hātea River is a river of New Zealand. It flows from the north-east of Whangārei southwards and into the northern head of Whangārei Harbour. Its lower length forms the eastern boundary of the city. The banks along the lower reaches are parks and bushland with a series of metalled walks suitable for all weathers.

At Whangārei Falls near Tikipunga, the Hātea River drops 26 metres (85 ft) over a basalt lava flow. The falls, originally known as Otuihau, have been a picnic spot since at least the 1890s.

The spelling of the river's name was amended from Hatea to Hātea by the New Zealand Geographic Board in 2007.

== See also ==
- List of rivers of New Zealand
