= Horahora, Whangārei =

Coordinates: 35.7359°S 174.3057°E

Horahora
- Suburb
- Interactive map of Horahora
- Country: New Zealand
- City: Whangārei
- Electoral ward: Whangārei Urban Ward

Area
  - Land: 171 ha (420 acres)

Population (June 2025)
  - Total: 1,820
  - Density: 1,060/km^{2} (2,760/sq mi)

	Woodhill	Woodhill
Maunu	Horahora	Morningside
Maunu	Raumanga, Otaika

Horahora is a suburb on the southwestern side of Whangārei, in Northland, New Zealand.

According to the 2013 New Zealand census, Horahora has a population of 1,053, an increase of 27 people since the 2006 census.

== Demographics ==
Horahora covers 1.71 km^{2} (0.66 sq mi) and had an estimated population of 1,820 as of June 2025, with a population density of 1,064 people per km^{2}.

Historical population
Year	Pop.	±% p.a.
2013	1,404	—
2018	1,587	+2.48%
2023	1,653	+0.82%

Horahora had a population of 1,653 in the 2023 New Zealand census, an increase of 66 people (4.2%) since the 2018 census, and an increase of 249 people (17.7%) since the 2013 census. There were 837 males, 810 females and 3 people of other genders in 618 dwellings. 3.3% of people identified as LGBTIQ+. The median age was 35.3 years (compared with 38.1 years nationally). There were 321 people (19.4%) aged under 15 years, 303 (18.3%) aged 15 to 29, 747 (45.2%) aged 30 to 64, and 279 (16.9%) aged 65 or older.

People could identify as more than one ethnicity. The results were 60.6% European (Pākehā); 30.1% Māori; 3.6% Pasifika; 22.1% Asian; 0.5% Middle Eastern, Latin American and African New Zealanders (MELAA); and 2.7% other, which includes people giving their ethnicity as "New Zealander". English was spoken by 95.3%, Māori language by 8.3%, Samoan by 0.4%, and other languages by 17.4%. No language could be spoken by 3.1% (e.g. too young to talk). New Zealand Sign Language was known by 0.5%. The percentage of people born overseas was 31.2, compared with 28.8% nationally.

Religious affiliations were 37.2% Christian, 1.8% Hindu, 1.3% Islam, 2.9% Māori religious beliefs, 0.7% Buddhist, 0.5% New Age, and 1.8% other religions. People who answered that they had no religion were 46.1%, and 7.4% of people did not answer the census question.

Of those at least 15 years old, 246 (18.5%) people had a bachelor's or higher degree, 651 (48.9%) had a post-high school certificate or diploma, and 357 (26.8%) people exclusively held high school qualifications. The median income was $36,600, compared with $41,500 nationally. 75 people (5.6%) earned over $100,000 compared to 12.1% nationally. The employment status of those at least 15 was that 672 (50.5%) people were employed full-time, 144 (10.8%) were part-time, and 42 (3.2%) were unemployed.

== Education ==
Hora Hora School is a co-educational contributing primary (years 1–6) school with a roll of 302 students as of March 2026. The school opened in 1893 and moved to its present site in 1925.

== Sport ==
The suburb of Horahora is home to many sports teams including;

=== Rugby ===
Hora Hora RFC (also known as Hora Hora) is a rugby club located on Te Mai Road, Whangarei, New Zealand. The premier club currently participates in the Northland Rugby Football Union's (NRFU's) South Zone premier competition.
