= Horahora =

Horahora may refer to the following entities in New Zealand:

- Horahora, Waikato, a locality southeast of Cambridge; see Waikato River Trails
- Horahora, Whangarei, a suburb of Whangarei
- Horahora Power Station, a defunct power station now submerged by Lake Karapiro
- Horahora River, Northland

== See also ==
- Hora Hora RFC, a rugby club based in Whangarei
- Hara horai, a species of South Asian river catfish
- Hora Hori, a 2016 Indian Telugu-language film
