= John Finlayson (politician) =

New Zealand politician (1890–1960)

The Honourable John Finlayson

Member of the New Zealand Legislative Council
- In office 22 June 1950 – 31 December 1950

Personal details
- Born: John Alexander Finlayson; 1890 Maungaturoto, New Zealand
- Died: 16 January 1960 (aged 69–70) Whangārei, New Zealand
- Party: National Party
- Relations: Innes Finlayson (brother)

John Alexander Finlayson (1890 – 16 January 1960) of Whangārei was appointed a member of the New Zealand Legislative Council on 22 June 1950. He was known to his family as Jack.

== Early life ==
Finlayson was born in 1890 at Maungaturoto, New Zealand. His father was Norman Finlayson (died 1938), prominent for decades as either president or patron of the Otamatea Rugby Union. Finlayson's grandparents had emigrated to New Zealand from Nova Scotia; his grandfather was also called John Finlayson. Innes Finlayson was an older brother.

== Interests ==
With an interest in education, Finlayson chaired the school committee in Mangapai in Whangarei District for seven years. He was on the board of the North Auckland Power Board for many years.

In his youth, Finlayson had been the best forward of the Maungaturoto club in 1910. For seven years, he held the presidency of the North Auckland Rugby Union. In May 1949, he was elected as one of the vice-presidents of the New Zealand Rugby Union (NZRU). In April 1950, he succeeded Don Max as chairman of the NZRU. He was succeeded as president by Stanley Botting in May 1951.

== Politics ==
Finlayson chaired the National Party in the Marsden electorate. He was appointed as a member of the suicide squad nominated by the First National Government in 1950 to vote for the abolition of the Council. Most of the new members (like Finlayson) were appointed on 22 June 1950, and served until 31 December 1950 when the Council was abolished. At the time of his appointment, he lived at Mangapai.

== Death ==
Finlayson died on 16 January 1960 in Whangārei. At the time, he was living in Langs Beach near Waipu.
