= Innes Finlayson =

New Zealand rugby player (1899–1980)

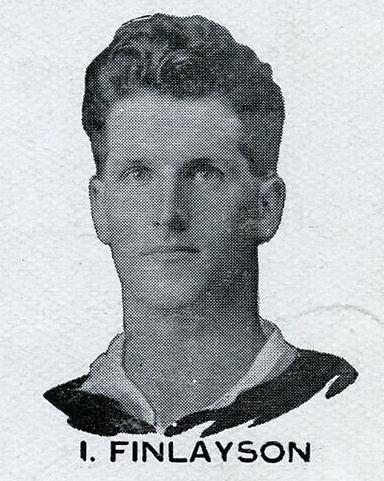
- Born: 4 July 1899 Maungaturoto, New Zealand
- Died: 29 January 1980 (aged 80) Whangārei, New Zealand
- Height: 1.88 m (6 ft 2 in)
- Weight: 95 kg (209 lb)
- School: Maungaturoto School
- Notable relative: John Finlayson (brother)

Rugby union career
- Position: Flanker
Amateur team(s)
Years	Team	Apps	(Points)
1920, 23–27, 29	Kamo		
1921	Maungakaramea		
Provincial / State sides
Years	Team	Apps	(Points)
1920, 23–27, 29	North Auckland		
International career
Years	Team	Apps	(Points)
1925–30	New Zealand	6	(0)

Innes "Bunny" Finlayson (4 July 1899 – 29 January 1980) was a New Zealand rugby union player who represented the national team, the All Blacks, between 1925 and 1930. His position of choice was flanker.

== Early life ==
Born in Maungaturoto in 1899, his father was Norman Finlayson (died 1938), prominent for decades as either president or patron of the Otamatea Rugby Union. Finlayson's grandparents had immigrated to New Zealand from Nova Scotia; John Finlayson was an older brother. Finlayson was educated at Maungaturoto School.

== Career ==
He made his first-class debut in North Auckland's first ever match, against South Island Country in 1920 at Kensington Park, Whangarei. He scored the first try in the union's history playing as a wing three-quarter.

Finlayson was selected as a loose forward for the 1925 New Zealand tour of Australia, his weight was listed at 15 st (95 kg) and height at 6 ft 2 in (1.88 m). Considered an in-form player Finlayson played in all six tour matches. He was later selected for the 1928 tour of South Africa where he played in all four test matches. In total he played 36 matches for the All Blacks with six of them being test matches. Although he scored no points in test matches, he totalled 35 points (11 tries, 1 conversion) in games for the All Blacks.

Finlayson served as a North Auckland selector from 1933 to 1935 and 1939 to 1940.

== Family and death ==
Other members of Finlayson's family were also prominent in rugby union. Three of his brothers, "Bain", "Tote" and Angus represented North Auckland in the 1920s. Another brother, Jack, was the North Auckland RFU president for the 1950 season, while another, Callum, played for Otago between 1927 and 1930. Angus also represented Auckland for a decade between 1924 and 1934.

Finlayson died in Whangārei in 1980, and was buried at Maunu Cemetery.
