= Portia Woodman =

New Zealand rugby union player (born 1991)

Portia Woodman-Wickliffe ONZM
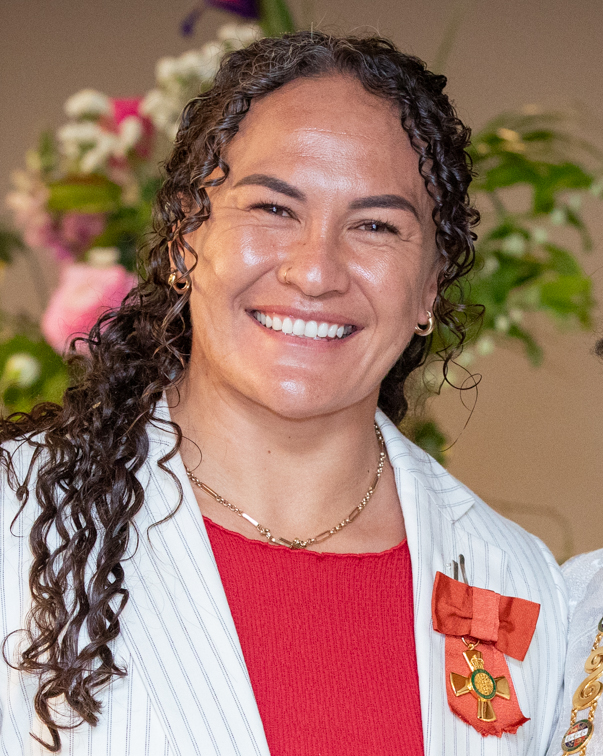
- Woodman-Wickliffe in 2025
- Born: 12 July 1991 (age 35) Kawakawa, New Zealand
- Height: 1.70 m (5 ft 7 in)
- Weight: 70 kg (154 lb)

Rugby union career
- Position: Wing
Provincial / State sides
Years	Team	Apps	(Points)
2013	Auckland Storm	1	(0)
2020	Northland Kauri	6	(45)
Super Rugby
Years	Team	Apps	(Points)
2022	Chiefs Manawa	3	(10)
2025–	Blues Women	7	(25)
International career
Years	Team	Apps	(Points)
2013–	New Zealand	34	(250)
National sevens team
Years	Team		Comps
2013–2024	New Zealand		241 apps
- Spouse: Renee Wickliffe (m. 2022)
- Father: Kawhena Woodman
- Relatives: Fred Woodman (uncle); Te Aroha Keenan (aunt); Ebony Raftstrand-Smith (niece); Tiana Raftstrand-Smith (niece)
Medal record
Representing New Zealand
Women's rugby union
Women's Rugby World Cup
Gold medal – first place	2017 Ireland	Team competition
Gold medal – first place	2021 New Zealand	Team competition
Bronze medal – third place	2025 England	Team competition
Women's rugby sevens
Olympic Games
Gold medal – first place	2024 Paris	Team competition
Gold medal – first place	2020 Tokyo	Team competition
Silver medal – second place	2016 Rio de Janeiro	Team competition
Commonwealth Games
Gold medal – first place	2018 Gold Coast	Team competition
Bronze medal – third place	2022 Birmingham	Team competition
Rugby World Cup Sevens
Gold medal – first place	2013 Moscow	Team competition
Gold medal – first place	2018 San Francisco	Team competition
Silver medal – second place	2022 Cape Town	Team competition

Portia Woodman-Wickliffe ONZM (née Woodman; born 12 July 1991) is a New Zealand rugby union player. She plays fifteen-a-side and seven-a-side rugby union, and was a member of the New Zealand women's national rugby sevens team and New Zealand women's national rugby union team. Woodman was a member of the New Zealand Women's Sevens team that won a silver medal at the 2016 Summer Olympics in Rio de Janeiro and gold medals at the 2020 Summer Olympics in Tokyo and at the 2024 Summer Olympics in Paris. She retired from international sevens rugby after the Paris Olympics.

In 2022, Woodman became the first woman to score 200 tries in the Sevens Series. In May 2024, Woodman became the first woman to score 250 tries in the Sevens Series. In May 2025 she became New Zealand's leading women's fifteen-a-side try scorer of all time. In August 2025, she set another record equalling Doug Howlett, after scoring her 49th try during the 2025 Women's Rugby World Cup match against Spain, and becoming NZ's equal highest try scorer of all time in test rugby, managing this in only 29 tests. She scored her 50th try in the match against Japan becoming the outright highest try scorer in New Zealand rugby history.

== Early life ==
Woodman was born in Kawakawa on 12 July 1991 to Kathryn and Kawhena Woodman. Both of her parents are teachers and named her after the heroine from their favourite play, The Merchant of Venice. Woodman has two brothers Baden and Dalton.

Woodman came from a sporting background with both her father, Kawhena and her uncle, Fred Woodman being former All Blacks. Her uncle Richard Woodman played for North Auckland. Her mother Kathryn had ambitions of playing for the Silver Ferns, and was close to selection for the national team until she became pregnant at 16 with Woodman's eldest brother. Her aunt Te Aroha Keenan is a former Silver Fern.

As a four-year-old she was fast enough to beat six-year-old girls in sprint races on family days at the local marae. Her speed was noticed at school and she was encouraged into athletics. Her early years were spent in Kaikohe before in 1997 the family relocated to Auckland. The seven year old Woodman remembers being distraught at the move away from her familiar environment.

Her first after school activity was ballet and it wasn't until a year later that after hearing that she was a fast runner that the coach of a boys team asked her to join his rugby team. This led to her being the only girl playing rugby at the Glenfield Rugby Union and Sports Club. Encouraged by her mother she also played netball. When Woodman was nine, she watched a replay of Jonah Lomu on TV playing against the English team in the 1995 World Cup and proclaimed to her father that she wanted to be the female Jonah Lomu.

Her secondary education was undertaken at Mount Albert Grammar School where her aunt Te Aroha Keenan, was Deputy Principal and in charge of netball. As rugby wasn't an option for girls at the school, the only other team option that interested her was netball. She also had hopes of representing her country in athletics at the Olympics and participated in the sport from the age of 10 until she was approximately 17 years old. This meant catching three buses from Mt Albert Grammar School to attend sprint training at AUT Millennium on the North Shore. Over summer weekends Woodman would compete for Takapuna Athletics Club at athletic events. The highlight of her athletics career was competing in the 100 metres and triple jump at the New Zealand Secondary Schools Championships in 2008 and the North Island New Zealand Secondary Schools Championships in 2009.

== Netball career ==
By the time she was in her teens Woodman had come to the conclusion that she wasn't going to be fast enough to reach the Olympics but as she still loved athletics, she continued with it as she increasingly concentrated on netball. She considered netball to be the only team sport which offered her best opportunity to play sport professionally. Woodman's ability led to her being selected as a development player for the Northern Mystics before being joining their senior squad in 2012. She played in the Trans-Tasman Netball League and in 2011 was selected for the Netball New Zealand development squad.

== Rugby career ==
=== Go for Gold ===
In 2012 the New Zealand Rugby Union organized a nationwide "Go for Gold" grassroots initiative to identify talent with the potential to represent New Zealand in the Sevens competition at the 2016 Summer Olympics, where rugby sevens was making its debut.

Woodman became aware of the initiative via an ad on Facebook which induced both Woodman and her friend Kayla McAlister at the Northern Mystics to attend a trial. At the trial (which they attended without informing their coach) they were put through various fitness, rugby skill and character assessment activities. Of the 800 who attended the trial, Woodman and McAlister were among the 30 deemed promising who attended a training camp at Waiouru in mid-2012. Woodman discovered an immediate synergy with the game. Looking back, Woodman has commented that athletics gave her the ability to run efficiently, while netball gave her the footwork and the hand-eye coordination skills to catch and run.

With the permission of the CEO of the Northern Mystics, Woodman and McAlister were allowed to play both netball and rugby. Woodman's initial contract to play for the sevens paid her $20,000 a year. To bring in additional income Woodman would train between 5:30 and 7:30 in the morning before working as a teacher's aide at a childcare centre before doing more training in the evening.

=== Debuts for the sevens ===
At her sevens International debut at the 2012 Oceania Women's Sevens Championship in Fiji she broke her shoulder in her very first game, as she didn't know how to tackle correctly and a woman whom Woodman tackled landed on top of her. She was however able to continue to play in the rest of the games at the tournament. The team won the championship which gained them entry to the 2013 World Cup in Moscow, Russia. Woodman's injury resulted in her not being able to play in the national provincial netball competition and no longer being invited to trials by the Mystics. This in turn led to Woodman being dropped from netball's Accelerant Squad. She took this as a sign and worried she would miss out on the opportunities developing in rugby she decided to fully concentrate on rugby. This was despite her mother wanting her to give netball two more years as she felt that her daughter was close to being selected for the Black Ferns.

Woodman was selected alongside Lauren Burgess, Marama Davis, Sarah Goss, Lavinia Gould, Carla Hohepa, Chyna Hohepa, Linda Itunu, Kayla McAlister, Huriana Manuel, Tyla Nathan Wong and Amanda Rasch in New Zealand's team for inaugural 2012–13 IRB Women's Sevens World Series, which they won after a fourth at Houston and wins at Guangzhou and Amsterdam having scored 169 points and conceded 34. Woodman was the top try and points scorer in the series with 105 points from 21 tries.

She went on to be a member of the team when it won the 2013 Rugby World Cup Sevens in Russia. Woodman was the top scorer at the World Cup.

=== Debuts for the fifteen-a-side Black Ferns ===
Her performance in the sevens led to Woodman debuting for the fifteen-a-side Black Ferns in 2013 against England. Returning to the sevens completion in the 2014–15 season, Woodman scored 52 tries, which made her just the fifth sevens player to break the half-century milestone in one series, and the first woman.

In 2015, Woodman was named the World Rugby Women's Sevens Player of the Year.

=== 2016 Rio Olympic Games ===
In 2016, Woodman was a member of the New Zealand Sevens team that competed at the Rugby sevens at the Rio Olympics. New Zealand were beaten by Australia in the final 24–17. Woodman was the top try scorer, scoring a total of 10 tries across the three-day tournament.

=== 2017 World Cup ===
She was a member of the fifteen-a-side Black Ferns team for the 2017 Women's Rugby World Cup squad. The Black Ferns went on to win the World Cup. Woodman scored the most points (65) and the most tries (13) during the tournament. Woodman didn't play for the fifteen-a-side Black Ferns again until 2021, due to a combination of sevens commitments, injuries and the COVID-19 pandemic.

=== 2018 Gold Coast Commonwealth Games ===
Woodman was selected in the New Zealand Sevens squad at the 2018 Commonwealth Games. The 2018 tournament was the first time that women's rugby sevens was contested at the Commonwealth Games. The Black Ferns won gold in extra-time, beating Australia 17–12.

=== Injury ===
Woodman ruptured her Achilles tendon while stepping back during a training session at Mount Maunganui in October 2018. Both of her parents had had Achilles injuries. Following surgery it wasn't until late in 2019 before she was able to play again. Woodman returned to sevens in November 2019 at the Oceania championships, only to injure her hamstring again in the final against Australia while chasing down Sariah Paki. The injury took longer than expected to heal, which caused Woodman to doubt if she would ever be able to play again. With support from the seven's mental skills coach and her friends she continued to work on her recovery.

By the time she was cleared to re-join the playing team, the COVID-19 lockdown in New Zealand brought an end to the team training together. At the same time Woodman felt that she still wasn't back to full condition or full speed. Convinced that she had to try another approach to regain her edge she used the advice of New Zealand sprint coach Kerry Hill to restore her running technique. To further improve her footwork and stop-start fluidity she was able (with the support of Cory Sweeney) to obtain permission from New Zealand Rugby to play three games of club netball.

Due to the lack of Sevens rugby Woodman struggled to retain her enthusiasm to keep training. She was then one of the Sevens players to take up the option to play fifteen-a-side rugby. Woodman moved back to stay with an aunt on her farm while over the next three months she played club rugby for the Kaikohe club and national provincial rugby for the Northland Kauri women's team. Despite Woodman's contribution of two tries Kaikohe lost the final of the Northland competition to Te Rarawa.

While Northland Kauri was unsuccessful in winning the Farah Palmer Cup in the 2020 national provincial women's championship Woodman scored six tries in her team's 77–3 victory over Taranaki. The 30 points she scored was the most by a Northland women's player in a single game. The competition also assisted in rekindling her love of the game. Between rugby commitments Woodman was able to carry on with her building apprenticeship by working with her uncles in Northland.

Woodman's return to sevens was when she played for the Power team at the 2020 Red Bull Ignite7 sevens tournament held at Blake Park in Mt Maunganui on 5–6 December 2020.

The opening of the trans-Tasman bubble in May 2021 allowed the playing of six games against Australia at the Orākei Domain in Auckland. The Black Sevens won the series 5–1 with Woodman back in top form.

=== 2020 Tokyo Olympic Games ===
Woodman was a member of the New Zealand Sevens team that won the gold medal at the Tokyo Olympics which was held in July 2021.

=== 2022 Commonwealth Games ===
Woodman was named in the Black Ferns Sevens squad for the 2022 Commonwealth Games in Birmingham. She won a bronze medal at the event. She was also part of the team that won a silver medal at the Rugby World Cup Sevens in Cape Town.

=== 2021 Rugby World Cup ===
Woodman made the Black Ferns 32-player squad for the deferred 2021 Rugby World Cup. She scored seven tries as the Black Ferns routed Japan 95–12 in their first encounter before the World Cup.

In the Black Ferns opening match of the Rugby World Cup, Woodman scored a hat-trick against the Wallaroos. She then scored a brace of tries against Wales in the second pool game. When the Black Ferns faced Wales again in the quarterfinals, she scored her second double.

In the World Cup final, Woodman was forced off the field after a head clash with England's winger, Lydia Thompson, in the 18th minute. With seven tries in total Woodman was the top try scorer at the World Cup.

=== Return to the seven series ===
After resting from her world cup duties she returned to play in the third and remaining tournaments of the 2022–2023 sevens season. During the quarterfinal game against Canada at 2022 Canada Women's Sevens tournament held in Langford on 30 April – 1 May 2022 she scored her 200th try.

She was a member of the New Zealand team for the 2023–24 season, during which at Los Angeles on 2 and 3 March 2024 she competed in her fiftieth international sevens tournament. At the time only five other women had reached this milestone, among the others being Charlotte Caslick, Sharni Williams and Chloé Pelle.

During the game against Ireland at 2024 Singapore Sevens tournament held on 3–5 May 2024 she scored her 250th try, plus she also scored a try in the final, which brought her up to a record 36 tries in Sevens finals, ahead of Michaela Blyde with 32 and Charlotte Caslick next with 13.

She ended the 2023–24 sevens season having played 43 matches and scored 27 tries.

On 20 June 2024 it was announced that she had been selected as a member of the New Zealand Women's Rugby Sevens team for the Paris Olympics. The team won the gold medal, defeating Canada 19–12 in the final. This was her last appearance for the New Zealand sevens team as previously on 2 July 2024 Woodman had announced that she would be retiring from international sevens after the Paris Olympics.

=== Move to Japan ===
From November 2024 to January 2025 Woodman played for the Mie Pearls rugby club in the 2024–2025 National Women's fifteen-a-side Rugby Championship. Joining her in Japan was her wife Renee, who was employed by the club as an assistant coach, and their daughter. The team lost to the defending champions Tokyo Sankyu Phoenix in the competition's final held on 2 February 2025.

=== Return to international competition ===
At the conclusion of the 2025 Aupiki competition following restrictions that prevented taking up a rugby league contract in Australia Woodman made herself available for international selection. Her first game back was as wing in New Zealand's 27-All with Canada 27-All in Apollo Projects Stadium, Christchurch on 17 May 2025.

Her next appearance was in the team's 79–14 win over the United States at North Harbour Stadium, Auckland on 24 May 2025. She scored seven of the team's tries to become New Zealand's leading women's fifteen-a-side try scorer of all time with 45 tries from 26 tests, passing Vanessa Cootes’ record of 43 tries in 16 tests, which had stood since 2002. Woodman also became only the third New Zealand woman to score 200 points in fifteen-a-side international rugby competition.

In July 2025, she was named in the Black Ferns squad to the Women's Rugby World Cup. She scored her 50th try against Japan at the World Cup and now holds the record for the most test tries in New Zealand rugby's history, men’s or women’s.

== Awards and honours ==
- 2015 World Rugby Rugby Women's Sevens Player of the Year.
- 2017 World Rugby Rugby Women's Player of the Year.
- 2017 Māori Sportswoman of the Year.
- 2020 World Rugby Women's Sevens Player of the Decade.

In the 2025 King's Birthday Honours, Woodman-Wickliffe was appointed an Officer of the New Zealand Order of Merit, for services to rugby.

== Personal life ==
Of Māori descent, Woodman affiliates to the Ngāpuhi iwi.

Woodman has been in a relationship with fellow Black Fern and World Cup winner Renee Wickliffe since 2013, and they married in December 2022. The couple have adopted the surname Woodman-Wickliffe.

Awards
Preceded by Tyrel Lomax	Tom French Memorial; Māori rugby union player of the year 2025	Incumbent
