= Raumanga =

- Suburb
- Interactive map of Raumanga
- Coordinates: 35.745°S 174.306°E
- Country: New Zealand
- City: Whangarei District Council
- Electoral ward: Whangārei Urban Ward

Area
  - Land: 450 ha (1,100 acres)

Population (June 2025)
  - Total: 5,600
  - Density: 1,200/km^{2} (3,200/sq mi)

Woodhill	Horahora	Morningside
Maunu	Raumanga	Port Whangārei
	Otaika	Toetoe

Raumanga is a suburb of Whangārei in the Northland Region of New Zealand. It is the site of Northland Polytechnic's main campus.

== Demographics ==
Raumanga covers 4.50 km^{2} (1.74 sq mi) and had an estimated population of 5,600 as of June 2025, with a population density of 1,244 people per km^{2}.

Historical population
Year	Pop.	±% p.a.
2006	4,743	—
2013	4,452	−0.90%
2018	5,292	+3.52%
2023	5,370	+0.29%
The 2006 population is for a smaller area of 4.40 km^{2} Source:

Raumanga had a population of 5,370 in the 2023 New Zealand census, an increase of 78 people (1.5%) since the 2018 census, and an increase of 918 people (20.6%) since the 2013 census. There were 2,715 males, 2,634 females and 18 people of other genders in 1,659 dwellings. 2.5% of people identified as LGBTIQ+. There were 1,428 people (26.6%) aged under 15 years, 1,185 (22.1%) aged 15 to 29, 2,214 (41.2%) aged 30 to 64, and 543 (10.1%) aged 65 or older.

People could identify as more than one ethnicity. The results were 51.1% European (Pākehā); 60.3% Māori; 9.6% Pasifika; 6.9% Asian; 0.8% Middle Eastern, Latin American and African New Zealanders (MELAA); and 0.9% other, which includes people giving their ethnicity as "New Zealander". English was spoken by 95.8%, Māori language by 17.0%, Samoan by 0.4%, and other languages by 6.8%. No language could be spoken by 2.5% (e.g. too young to talk). New Zealand Sign Language was known by 0.8%. The percentage of people born overseas was 12.3, compared with 28.8% nationally.

Religious affiliations were 28.9% Christian, 0.7% Hindu, 0.6% Islam, 7.8% Māori religious beliefs, 0.4% Buddhist, 0.6% New Age, 0.1% Jewish, and 1.1% other religions. People who answered that they had no religion were 53.4%, and 6.9% of people did not answer the census question.

Of those at least 15 years old, 318 (8.1%) people had a bachelor's or higher degree, 2,262 (57.4%) had a post-high school certificate or diploma, and 1,284 (32.6%) people exclusively held high school qualifications. 111 people (2.8%) earned over $100,000 compared to 12.1% nationally. The employment status of those at least 15 was that 1,833 (46.5%) people were employed full-time, 429 (10.9%) were part-time, and 267 (6.8%) were unemployed.

Individual statistical areas
Name	Area (km^{2})	Population	Density (per km^{2})	Dwellings	Median age	Median income
Raumanga	3.46	3,345	967	1,026	30.9 years	$33,900
Tarewa	1.04	2,025	1,947	633	30.7 years	$33,300
New Zealand					38.1 years	$41,500

== Education ==
Manaia View School is a coeducational full primary (years 1–8) school with a roll of 193 students as at March 2026. The school was formed in 2002 with the merger of Raumanga Primary and Middle Schools.
