= Maunu =

Maunu is either of the villages:

- Maunu, New Zealand, A suburb of Whangarei, New Zealand
- Maunu (Enontekiö), Finland

Maunu is also the Finnish form of the Swedish name Magnus.
