= Bevan Holmes =

- Born: 7 April 1946 (age 80) Christchurch, New Zealand
- Height: 1.88 m (6 ft 2 in)
- Weight: 97 kg (214 lb)
- School: Northland College

Rugby union career
- Position(s): Number 8 Flanker
Provincial / State sides
Years	Team	Apps	(Points)
1966–74, 77–78	North Auckland	90	
International career
Years	Team	Apps	(Points)
1970–73	New Zealand	0	(0)

Bevan Holmes (born 7 April 1946) is a New Zealand former rugby union player. A number 8 and flanker, Bevan represented North Auckland at a provincial level, and was a member of the New Zealand national side, the All Blacks, from 1970 to 1973. He holds the dubious distinction of making the most appearances for the All Blacks, namely 31, without playing in an international.
