= Not Your Cupid =

Studio album by Erny Belle
- Released: 10 November 2023
- Studio: Roundhead (Auckland)
- Genre: Alt-pop; alternative country
- Length: 31:06
- Label: Flying Nun
- Producer: Erny Belle; De Stevens

Erny Belle chronology
Venus Is Home (2022)	Not Your Cupid (2023)

Singles from Not Your Cupid
- 1. "Unchained" Released: 24 August 2023; 2. "Stay Golden" Released: 21 September 2023; 3. "Pitt Stop" Released: 18 October 2023

Not Your Cupid is the second studio album by Erny Belle, the stage name of New Zealand singer-songwriter Aimee Renata. The album was released on 10 November 2023 through Flying Nun Records, and received positive reviews from critics, reaching the top 40 of the Official Aotearoa Music Charts.

== Background and composition ==
Renata independently released her debut album, Venus Is Home, in early 2022 after previously working as a costume designer. It was critically successful and led to the singer being signed by Flying Nun Records. She did not initially plan on creating a follow-up album in such quick succession, but having the support of a label allowed for a less pressured creative process than when she was an independent artist.

Not Your Cupid takes inspiration from a wide range of musical genres and styles, including doo-wop, Pacific pop, folk, and electropop. As a whole, it has been classified as alt-pop by the New Zealand Listener and alternative country by Rolling Stone Australia and Radio New Zealand. Although Venus Is Home had a firm personal focus on the death of Renata's grandmother and her family's hometown of Maungaturoto, Not Your Cupid is less attached to overarching lyrical themes. Renata specifically described the album during its promotional period as "less narrative, more cryptic, less thought, more intuition." Particular lyrical ideas that are explored include becoming at peace with the future in "Unchained" and the perseverance of love in "Stay Golden."

== Singles ==
Not Your Cupid was supported by three singles. "Unchained" was released as the album's lead single on 24 August 2023, supported by a music video featuring Renata travelling on a bus to Ruawai. The second single, "Stay Golden," was released the following month on 21 September. It was accompanied by a video that casts the singer dressed in gold alongside two Tahitian dancers. "Pitt Stop," the third and final single, was released just under a month later on 18 October. Its music video was inspired by New Zealand domesticity during the 1960s and 70s, starring Renata as a housewife. All three music videos were co-directed by Renata and Matt Hunter.

== Critical reception ==
Upon its release, Not Your Cupid was met with acclaim by New Zealand music critics. Graham Reid of the New Zealand Listener and Tony Stamp of Radio New Zealand both highlighted the addition of expanded musical influences to Renata's defining sound — labelled by Reid as "captivating" and "cryptic" — in their positive reviews of the album. Writing for Rolling Stone Australia, Conor Lochrie described Not Your Cupid as "beautiful" in an initial review, seconding comments made by Stamp of its understated brilliance. Lochrie went on to rank the album as Rolling Stone Australia's No. 1 New Zealand album of 2023. He praised its melodies and "grander and more pristine" arrangements in comparison to Renata's debut, as well as her "elementally Kiwi" musical style spanning multiple genres.

== Track listing ==
All tracks are written by Aimee Renata (Erny Belle) and produced by Erny Belle and De Stevens.

No.	Title	Length
1.	"Bowman"	4:50
2.	"Unchained"	3:58
3.	"Pitt Stop"	3:00
4.	"Crypto"	3:24
5.	"Midnight Madness"	3:35
6.	"Stay Golden"	2:53
7.	"Inertia"	3:01
8.	"C'est La Vie"	3:23
9.	"Not Your Cupid"	2:59
Total length:		31:06

== Personnel ==
Credits adapted from the liner notes of Not Your Cupid.

Musicians

- Erny Belle – vocals (all tracks), shaker (2), singing bowl (2), additional drums (4)
- Léa Charron – spoken word (8)
- Jackson W Hobbs – drums (all tracks), percussion (2–4, 6), drum programming (5), synthesizer programming (6)
- Tiare Kelly – piano (1, 4, 7–9), sitar (1, 4), acoustic guitar (2–4), vocals (2, 3, 6, 8), synthesizer (3, 5, 6), additional composition (5, 9), percussion (6), guitar (8)
- Dave Khan – strings (1, 5, 7, 8), electric guitar (2, 3, 5, 6), synthesizer (2, 5, 6), piano (3), 12-string guitar (4), acoustic guitar (4), additional composition (5)
- Semisi Ma'ia'i – acoustic guitar (2), vocals (2, 4, 8)
- Rewi McLay – lap steel guitar (3, 5, 6)
- De Stevens – synthesizer (6, 8), guitar (8)
- Navakatoa Tekela-Pule – bass (all tracks), additional composition (5, 7, 9), percussion (6), guitar (7, 9)

Technical

- Erny Belle – production
- Semisi Ma'ia'i – vocal production
- Adrian Morgan – mastering
- De Stevens – mixing, production

== Charts ==
Chart (2023)	Peak position
New Zealand Albums (RMNZ)	31
