= Riverside, Whangārei =

Riverside
- Suburb
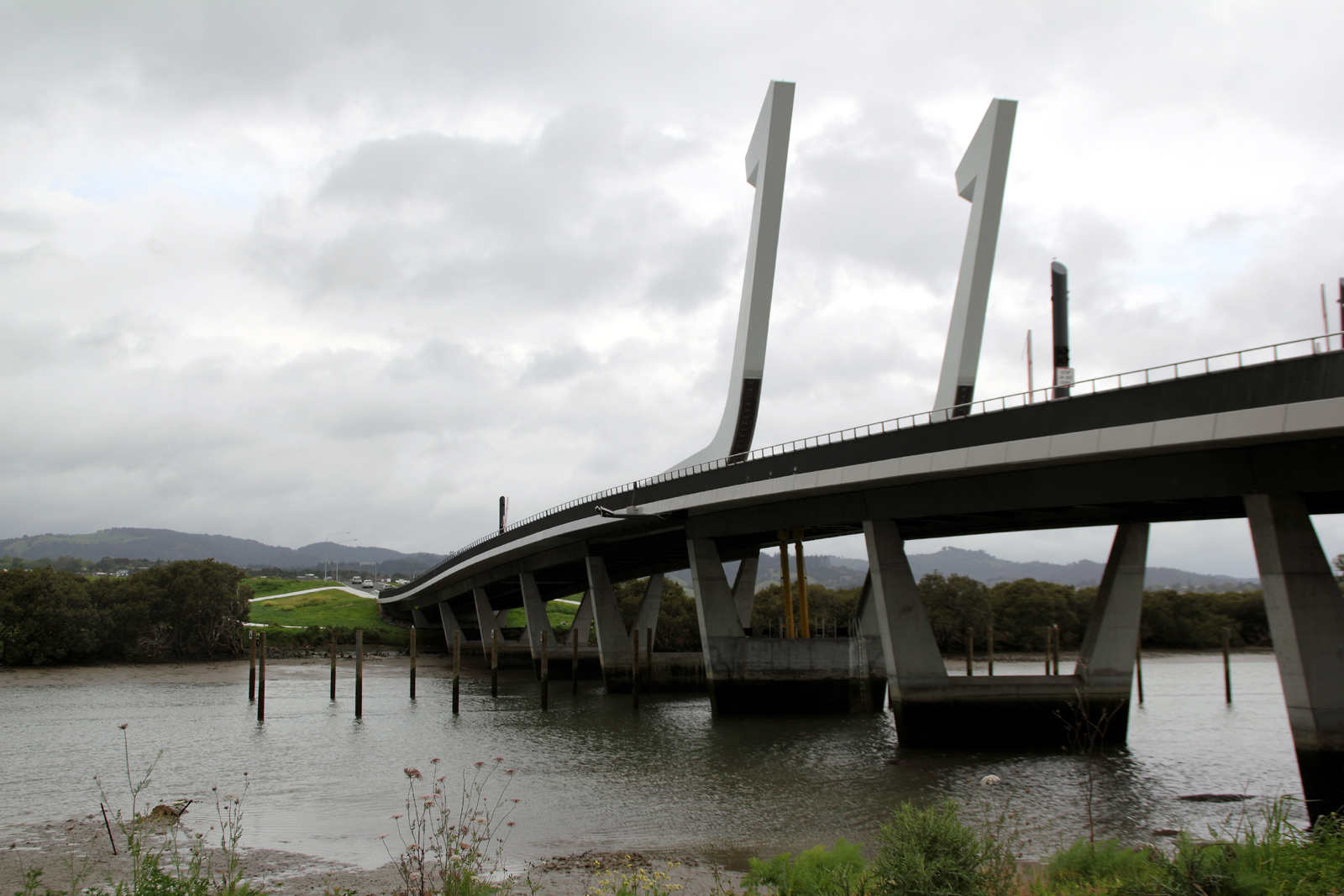
- Looking across the Te Matau ā Pohe bridge to Pohe Island
- Interactive map of Riverside
- Coordinates: 35.728°S 174.336°E
- Country: New Zealand
- City: Whangārei
- Local authority: Whangarei District Council
- Electoral ward: Whangārei Urban Ward

Area
  - Land: 351 ha (870 acres)

Population (June 2025)
  - Total: 2,130
  - Density: 607/km^{2} (1,570/sq mi)

| Regent | (Mount Parihaka) | Abbey Caves |
| Whangārei Central | Riverside | Parahaki |
| Morningside | Port Whangārei | Onerahi |

Riverside (Māori: Ōruku) is a suburb of Whangārei, in Northland Region, New Zealand. It is east of the city centre, across the Hātea River.

Pohe Island is a 54 square kilometre open space which is adjacent to the mouth of the Hātea River and Whangārei Harbour. it contains William Fraser Memorial Park. William Mackenzie Fraser, for whom the park is named, was an engineer for Whangarei County from 1907 to 1918, held various positions with the Whangarei Harbour Board from 1920 until 1947, and was a County Council member from 1947 until his death in 1960.

== Demographics ==
The Riverside statistical area, which includes the neighbouring suburb of Parahaki, covers 3.51 km^{2} (1.36 sq mi) and had an estimated population of 2,130 as of June 2025, with a population density of 607 people per km^{2}.

Historical population
| Year | Pop. | ±% p.a. |
|---|---|---|
| 2006 | 1,947 | — |
| 2013 | 1,791 | −1.19% |
| 2018 | 2,085 | +3.09% |
| 2023 | 2,106 | +0.20% |

Riverside had a population of 2,106 in the 2023 New Zealand census, an increase of 21 people (1.0%) since the 2018 census, and an increase of 315 people (17.6%) since the 2013 census. There were 1,014 males, 1,086 females and 6 people of other genders in 831 dwellings. 3.8% of people identified as LGBTIQ+. The median age was 42.7 years (compared with 38.1 years nationally). There were 342 people (16.2%) aged under 15 years, 342 (16.2%) aged 15 to 29, 1,002 (47.6%) aged 30 to 64, and 420 (19.9%) aged 65 or older.

People could identify as more than one ethnicity. The results were 80.9% European (Pākehā); 29.2% Māori; 4.1% Pasifika; 5.1% Asian; 1.6% Middle Eastern, Latin American and African New Zealanders (MELAA); and 2.8% other, which includes people giving their ethnicity as "New Zealander". English was spoken by 96.2%, Māori language by 6.8%, Samoan by 0.4%, and other languages by 7.8%. No language could be spoken by 2.6% (e.g. too young to talk). New Zealand Sign Language was known by 0.3%. The percentage of people born overseas was 21.9, compared with 28.8% nationally.

Religious affiliations were 28.6% Christian, 0.6% Hindu, 0.3% Islam, 1.3% Māori religious beliefs, 0.7% Buddhist, 0.6% New Age, and 1.7% other religions. People who answered that they had no religion were 60.4%, and 6.0% of people did not answer the census question.

Of those at least 15 years old, 282 (16.0%) people had a bachelor's or higher degree, 1,008 (57.1%) had a post-high school certificate or diploma, and 381 (21.6%) people exclusively held high school qualifications. The median income was $42,800, compared with $41,500 nationally. 165 people (9.4%) earned over $100,000 compared to 12.1% nationally. The employment status of those at least 15 was that 891 (50.5%) people were employed full-time, 246 (13.9%) were part-time, and 57 (3.2%) were unemployed.
