= Matt Moulds =

New Zealand rugby union player

- Full name: Matthew Gary Moulds
- Born: 15 May 1991 (age 35) Kaipara, New Zealand
- Height: 188 cm (6 ft 2 in)
- Weight: 107 kg (236 lb; 16 st 12 lb)
- School: Otamatea High School
- Notable relative: Jessica Moulds (sister)

Rugby union career
- Position: Hooker
- Current team: Northland
Senior career
Years	Team	Apps	(Points)
2013–2018, 2022–	Northland	79	(50)
2015–2019	Blues	31	(10)
2019–2021	Worcester Warriors	12	(0)
2021	Gloucester	2	(0)
2022	San Diego Legion	8	(10)
2024	Mitsubishi Sagamihara Dynaboars	3	(0)
2025–	Crusaders	1	(0)
- Correct as of 23 March 2025
National sevens team
Years	Team		Comps
2014	New Zealand		1
- Correct as of 23 March 2025

Matthew Gary Moulds (born 15 May 1991) is a New Zealand rugby union player who currently plays as a hooker for the Crusaders in Super Rugby and for Northland in the Bunnings NPC. He has also previously represented New Zealand at rugby sevens.

== Club career ==
Moulds started out his career with the Northland Taniwha during the 2013 ITM Cup and quickly established himself as a regular member of their starting fifteen. 2014 was a good year for both the Taniwha, who finished 3rd in the Championship standings with 5 wins and 5 losses and for Moulds, who played 10 times and scored 2 tries.

2015 and 2016 saw Moulds captain the Taniwha in what turned out to be 2 disappointing seasons. As captain, however, he was a guaranteed starter and made 16 appearances across the 2 seasons, scoring 1 try.

Impressive performances at provincial level were rewarded in 2015, when he was named in the Blues wider training group for the 2015 Super Rugby season. He made 1 appearance in his debut season, as a replacement in a match against the Stormers, but further good provincial performances saw him named in the Blues full squad for 2016. The presence of experienced hookers in the shape of All Black James Parsons and the well travelled Quentin MacDonald meant game time was rare for Moulds who had to take the role of third choice for the Blues. He did get on the field twice during the season, with both appearances coming from the bench.

Moulds was again named in the Blues squad for 2017 where he would compete with Parsons and Waikato newcomer Hame Faiva for the number 2 shirt.

On 25 April 2019, Moulds moved to England to join Gallagher Premiership side Worcester Warriors.

On 27 September 2021, Moulds was released by Worcester as he signed for local rivals Gloucester on a short term deal.

On 16 January 2022, after he left Gloucester, Moulds travelled to the US as he signed for the San Diego Legion of Major League Rugby (MLR).

On March 21, 2025, Moulds was a late inclusion in Round 6 of the 2025 Super Rugby season for the Crusaders. On March 22, 2025, he made his debut for the club against his former team, the Blues, in Auckland.

== International career ==
Moulds was a member of the New Zealand sevens wider training squad in early 2014 and was part of the side which competed in the Wellington Sevens in February 2014.
