= Don Max =

Don Max may refer to:

- Don Max (rugby union) (1906–1972), New Zealand rugby union player
- Don Max (film editor) (born 1980), Indian film editor and director
