= Kawhena Woodman =

- Born: Taui Ben Kawhena Woodman; 9 May 1960 (age 66) Kaikohe, New Zealand
- Height: 1.80 m (5 ft 11 in)
- Weight: 90 kg (200 lb)
- School: Northland College
- University: University of Auckland
- Notable relatives: Fred Woodman (brother); Portia Woodman (daughter)

Rugby union career
- Position: Wing
Provincial / State sides
Years	Team	Apps	(Points)
1980–1992	North Auckland	126	
International career
Years	Team	Apps	(Points)
1982–1988	New Zealand Māori		
1984	New Zealand	0	(0)

Taui Ben Kawhena Woodman (born 9 May 1960) is a former New Zealand rugby union player. A wing, Woodman represented North Auckland at a provincial level, and was a member of the New Zealand national side, the All Blacks, in 1984. He made six appearances for the All Blacks but did not play any test matches. His brother Fred Woodman was also an All Black; his daughter Portia Woodman is a New Zealand women's rugby team representative.
