= Whangārei Central =

- Suburb
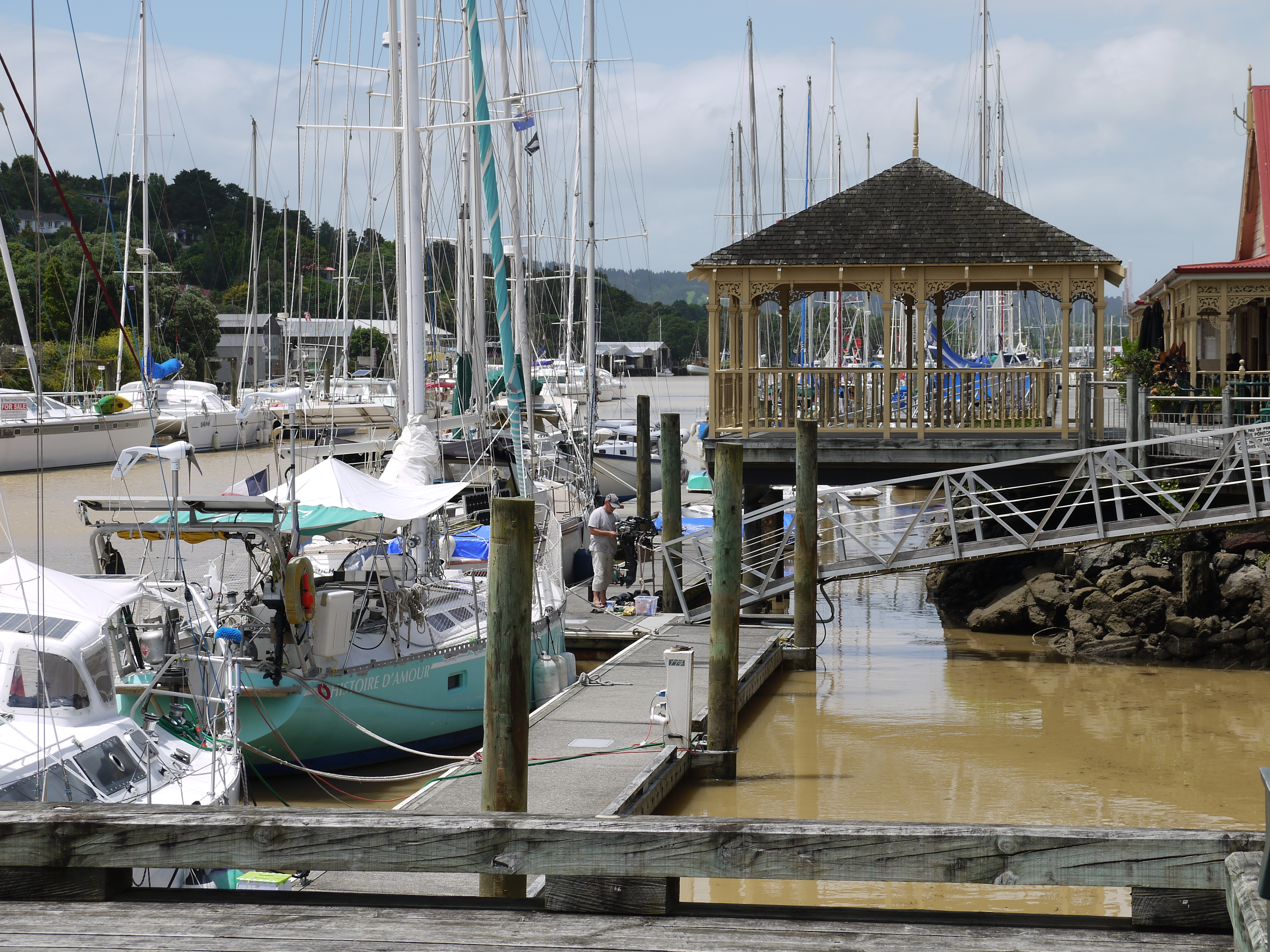
- Marina at Whangārei Town Basin
- Interactive map of Whangārei Central
- Coordinates: 35.725543°S 174.323327°E
- Country: New Zealand
- City: Whangārei
- Local authority: Whangarei District Council
- Electoral ward: Whangārei Urban Ward

Area
  - Land: 281 ha (690 acres)

Population (June 2025)
  - Total: 860
  - Density: 310/km^{2} (790/sq mi)

Avenues	Regent
	Whangārei Central	(Hātea River)
Woodhill	Morningside	Riverside, Whangārei

Whangārei Central is the central business district of Whangārei, in the Northland Region of New Zealand's North Island. It includes the Whangārei Town Basin. It has traditionally been the main commercial centre of Northland. As of 2017, approximately 39% of the 1404 businesses were commercial and professional services; 19% were retail and food businesses.

In March 2019, Whangarei District Council decided to build a new precinct on the north-western side of the CBD.

== Demographics ==
Whangārei Central covers 2.81 km^{2} (1.08 sq mi) and had an estimated population of 860 as of June 2025, with a population density of 306 people per km^{2}.

Historical population
Year	Pop.	±% p.a.
2006	894	—
2013	759	−2.31%
2018	954	+4.68%
2023	858	−2.10%

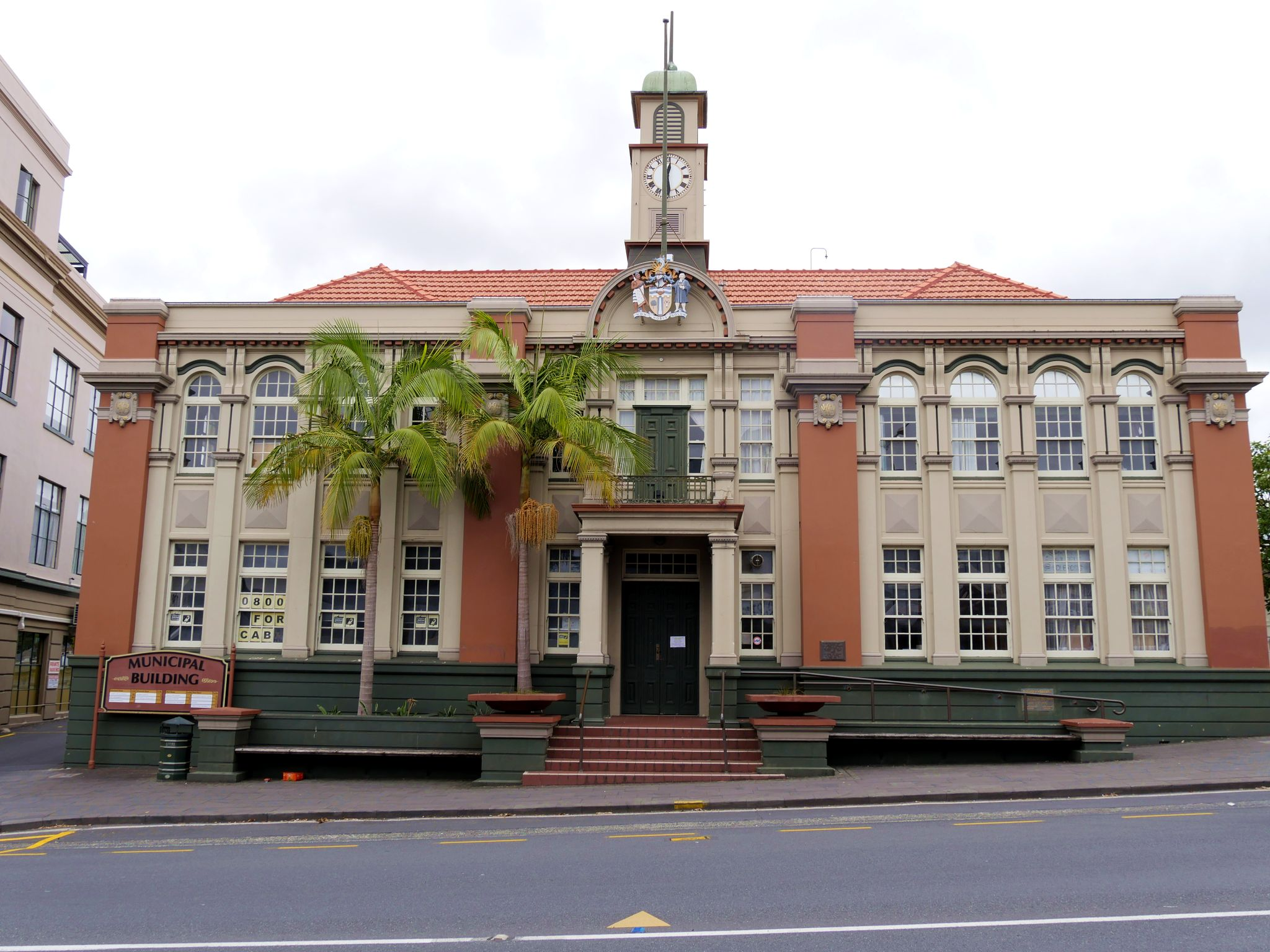
Whangārei municipal building

Whangārei Central had a population of 858 in the 2023 New Zealand census, a decrease of 96 people (−10.1%) since the 2018 census, and an increase of 99 people (13.0%) since the 2013 census. There were 423 males and 432 females in 369 dwellings. 4.9% of people identified as LGBTIQ+. The median age was 49.3 years (compared with 38.1 years nationally). There were 114 people (13.3%) aged under 15 years, 138 (16.1%) aged 15 to 29, 378 (44.1%) aged 30 to 64, and 225 (26.2%) aged 65 or older.

People could identify as more than one ethnicity. The results were 67.1% European (Pākehā); 32.5% Māori; 5.9% Pasifika; 11.2% Asian; 0.7% Middle Eastern, Latin American and African New Zealanders (MELAA); and 1.7% other, which includes people giving their ethnicity as "New Zealander". English was spoken by 96.9%, Māori language by 10.8%, Samoan by 0.7%, and other languages by 11.2%. No language could be spoken by 1.0% (e.g. too young to talk). New Zealand Sign Language was known by 1.0%. The percentage of people born overseas was 24.5, compared with 28.8% nationally.

Religious affiliations were 31.5% Christian, 1.4% Hindu, 1.7% Islam, 3.5% Māori religious beliefs, 1.4% Buddhist, 0.3% New Age, and 2.1% other religions. People who answered that they had no religion were 52.4%, and 6.6% of people did not answer the census question.

Of those at least 15 years old, 123 (16.5%) people had a bachelor's or higher degree, 363 (48.8%) had a post-high school certificate or diploma, and 228 (30.6%) people exclusively held high school qualifications. The median income was $30,400, compared with $41,500 nationally. 39 people (5.2%) earned over $100,000 compared to 12.1% nationally. The employment status of those at least 15 was that 291 (39.1%) people were employed full-time, 87 (11.7%) were part-time, and 33 (4.4%) were unemployed.

== Features ==
Whangārei Central has several art galleries:

- Hundertwasser Art Centre and Wairau Māori Art Gallery opened in 2022.
- Reyburn House Art Gallery opened in 1966.
- Whangārei Art Museum opened in 1996.
