= Alf Waterman =

NZ international rugby union player (1903-1997)

- Full name: Alfred Clarence Waterman
- Born: 31 December 1903 Epsom, Auckland, New Zealand
- Died: 22 October 1997 (aged 93) Whangārei, New Zealand
- Height: 173 cm (5 ft 8 in)
- Weight: 70 kg (11 st 0 lb)
- School: Auckland Grammar School

Rugby union career
- Position: Wing
Provincial / State sides
Years	Team	Apps	(Points)
1928–29	North Auckland		
International career
Years	Team	Apps	(Points)
1929	New Zealand	2	(0)

Alfred Clarence Waterman (31 December 1903 — 22 October 1997) was a New Zealand international rugby union player active in the 1920s.

A diminutive wing three-quarter, Waterman was an Auckland Grammar School 1st XV player in 1920.

Waterman was based during his career in Whangārei, having moved there to take up work as a post office technician. His union, North Auckland, had a sparse fixture list and Waterman didn't play representative rugby until 1928. A strong performance against Auckland earned Waterman an All Blacks trial and he won a place on the 1929 tour of Australia. He scored four tries in an early tour match against Newcastle, aiding his selection for the opening Test in Sydney.

== See also ==
- List of New Zealand national rugby union players
