= Woodhill, Whangārei =

Woodhill
- Suburb
- Interactive map of Woodhill
- Coordinates: 35.731°S 174.311°E
- Country: New Zealand
- City: Whangārei
- Local authority: Whangarei District Council
- Electoral ward: Whangārei Urban Ward

Area
  - Land: 139 ha (340 acres)

Population (June 2025)
  - Total: 2,970
  - Density: 2,140/km^{2} (5,530/sq mi)

	Kensington	Whangārei Central
Maunu	Woodhill
Horahora	Raumanga	Morningside

Woodhill (Māori: Kauika) is a suburb of Whangārei, in Northland Region, New Zealand. It is about 1.5 kilometres southwest of the city centre. State Highway 1 runs through Woodhill, bypassing the CBD, and State Highway 14 ends at an intersection with SH1. Whangarei Hospital is on SH14 between Woodhill and Horahora.

== History ==
The area has been called Woodhill since the late 19th century and was developed as "Woodhill Estate" at the beginning of the 20th century Water pipes were laid about 1907. Around 1910–1911, discussions were held by the Whangarei Borough Council about metalling the roads of the estate.

Woodhill was originally part of Whangarei County, but was transferred to Whangarei Borough in 1949.

== Demographics ==
The statistical area of Woodhill-Vinetown, which approximately matches this suburb, covers 1.39 km^{2} (0.54 sq mi) and had an estimated population of 2,970 as of June 2025, with a population density of 2,137 people per km^{2}.

Historical population
Year	Pop.	±% p.a.
2006	2,490	—
2013	2,439	−0.30%
2018	2,847	+3.14%
2023	2,802	−0.32%

Woodhill-Vinetown had a population of 2,802 in the 2023 New Zealand census, a decrease of 45 people (−1.6%) since the 2018 census, and an increase of 363 people (14.9%) since the 2013 census. There were 1,332 males, 1,461 females and 9 people of other genders in 1,134 dwellings. 4.2% of people identified as LGBTIQ+. The median age was 37.5 years (compared with 38.1 years nationally). There were 459 people (16.4%) aged under 15 years, 576 (20.6%) aged 15 to 29, 1,293 (46.1%) aged 30 to 64, and 474 (16.9%) aged 65 or older.

People could identify as more than one ethnicity. The results were 63.0% European (Pākehā); 33.4% Māori; 5.7% Pasifika; 18.5% Asian; 0.5% Middle Eastern, Latin American and African New Zealanders (MELAA); and 2.5% other, which includes people giving their ethnicity as "New Zealander". English was spoken by 94.9%, Māori language by 9.5%, Samoan by 0.9%, and other languages by 12.8%. No language could be spoken by 2.8% (e.g. too young to talk). New Zealand Sign Language was known by 0.6%. The percentage of people born overseas was 25.7, compared with 28.8% nationally.

Religious affiliations were 30.3% Christian, 3.1% Hindu, 0.7% Islam, 2.8% Māori religious beliefs, 0.6% Buddhist, 1.0% New Age, 0.1% Jewish, and 3.7% other religions. People who answered that they had no religion were 49.5%, and 8.1% of people did not answer the census question.

Of those at least 15 years old, 381 (16.3%) people had a bachelor's or higher degree, 1,176 (50.2%) had a post-high school certificate or diploma, and 672 (28.7%) people exclusively held high school qualifications. The median income was $35,800, compared with $41,500 nationally. 117 people (5.0%) earned over $100,000 compared to 12.1% nationally. The employment status of those at least 15 was that 1,173 (50.1%) people were employed full-time, 279 (11.9%) were part-time, and 84 (3.6%) were unemployed.
