= Glenn Taylor (rugby union) =

- Born: Glenn Lyndon Taylor; 23 September 1970 (age 56) Whangārei, New Zealand
- Height: 1.99 m (6 ft 6 in)
- Weight: 108 kg (238 lb)
- School: Dargaville High School
- Occupation: Builder

Rugby union career
- Position(s): Lock; Flanker
Provincial / State sides
Years	Team	Apps	(Points)
1990–2003	Northland	143	
Super Rugby
Years	Team	Apps	(Points)
1996–97, 2000, 2003	Chiefs	29	
1998	Hurricanes	11	
1999, 2001–02	Blues	23	(5)
International career
Years	Team	Apps	(Points)
1991	New Zealand Colts		
1992–96	New Zealand	1	(0)

Glenn Lyndon Taylor (born 23 September 1970) is a former New Zealand rugby union player. A lock and flanker, Taylor captained Northland at a provincial level and the Chiefs, Hurricanes and Blues in Super Rugby. He was a member of the New Zealand national side, the All Blacks, in 1992 and 1996, playing six matches including one international for the side.
