= Te Matau ā Pohe =

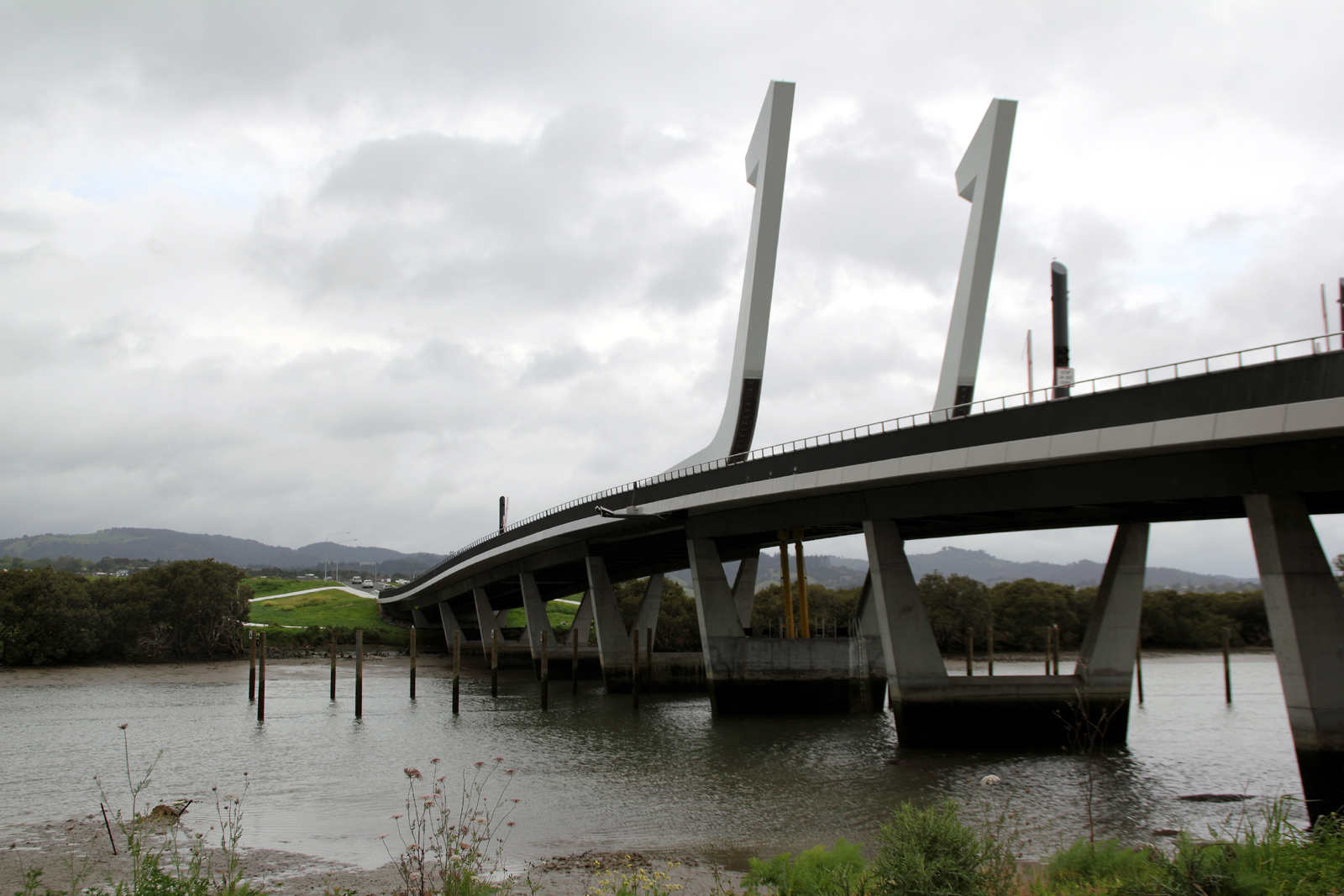
- The bridge viewed from the west bank of Riverside, Whangārei with a view of Pohu Island on the east side
- Coordinates: 35°44′6″S 174°20′7″E
- Carries: Vehicles, bicycles, pedestrians
- Crosses: Hātea River
- Other name: Lower Hatea Crossing
- Named for: Chief Pohe

Characteristics
- Design: bascule
- Total length: 265 metres
- Width: 17 metres
- Capacity: 6,000 vehicles per day

Location
- Interactive map of Te Matau ā Pohe

Te Matau ā Pohe ("The Fishhook of Pohe"), also known as the Lower Hatea Crossing and Whangarei Harbour Bridge, is a rolling bascule bridge at the east side of Whangārei city, Northland Region, New Zealand.

It spans the Hātea River from the west bank of Riverside, Whangārei to Pohe Island, and is open to vehicles, bicycles, and pedestrians.

The bridge opened on July 27, 2013, at a cost of NZ$32 million, making it the largest and most expensive civil engineering project undertaken by the Whangarei District Council.

== Name ==
Pohe in the name "The Fishhook of Pohe" refers to the Māori chief who welcomed the English settlers when they first arrived in Whangārei.

== Description ==
The bridge is 265 metres (869 ft) long and 17 metres (56 ft) wide with two distinctive curved, hook-shaped beams, pointing upward, nearly 20 metres (66 ft) tall.

The bascule section is all steel. The deck is made of a composite of steel and concrete. The support piers were constructed with in-situ concrete.

The lifting section is 25 metres (82 ft) long and is counterbalanced by the two hook-shaped beams each weighing 360 tonnes. These point upward when the deck is down, giving the bridge its characteristic appearance. The opening mechanism does not have a pivot point as it is not hinged. Instead, the entire structure rolls along a toothed track. This lifting section, when raised, allows boats (taller than 7.5 metres) to pass.

This lifting section is controlled by two vertical, hydraulic pistons below the bridge. As the deck is raised, 67‑tonne counterweights moving in the opposite direction allow the entire system to remain balanced and stable.

The design was inspired by Māori fish hooks made of bone. A model for this design was based on a model using Rhinoceros 3D software and a plug-in called Grasshopper 3D.

The bridge was closed for 24 hours for repairs around May 2026. Cracks were found in some of the welding inside the hook beams. This work was needed urgently to prevent structural damage.

== Vessel traffic ==
The bridge is regularly raised at noon every day. Also, skippers can request, by radio or phone, that the bridge be raised. However, the bridge is not raised during peak road traffic times, nor when winds exceed 34 knots (gale force).

The bridge is raised about five times each day, and completed its 20,000th lift in 2023.

The channel is marked with wooden marker piles. The width is 16 metres (52 ft). The channel depth between these wooden marker piles is 1 metre (3 ft 3 in) below chart datum.

== Road deck traffic ==
Te Matau ā Pohe bridge allows vehicles, bicycles, and pedestrian traffic. The roadway in the centre has one vehicle lane in each direction, and there is a pathway on both sides for non-motorized traffic.

The road on the J-shaped deck, David Culham Drive, carries about 11,000 vehicles per day on average. This is substantially higher than the 8,000 forecast.
