= Pompallier Catholic College =

Location
- State Highway 14, Maunu, Whangārei, New Zealand; 35.7462°S 174.2764°E

Information
- Type: State integrated Secondary (Year 7–13)
- Motto: Deligere Verum; Love the Truth
- Established: 1971; 55 years ago
- Ministry of Education Institution no.: 17
- Principal: Mr Hayden Kingdon
- Enrolment: 650 (July 2026)
- Socio-economic decile: 7
- Website: Pompallier Catholic College website

Pompallier Catholic College is a Catholic co-educational secondary school located in the suburb of Maunu in Whangārei, New Zealand. It is one of nine secondary schools within the Marist network. Pompallier Catholic College is named after Bishop Jean Baptiste Francois Pompallier who led the first group of Catholic Missionaries from Lyon, France, to New Zealand. The patron saint of the college is John the Baptist. Students of Pompallier Catholic College are colloquially known as Pompallians.

== School structure ==
The school is divided into four houses. The house patrons have been chosen by students on the basis of their connection with Te Tai Tokerau and/or the Colleges Catholic and Marist charism. They are:

Tate Green house. Named after Pa Henare Tate

Aubert Blue house. Named after Sister Suzanne Aubert

Chavoin Yellow house. Named after Jeanne-Marie Chavoin

Colin Red house. Named after Jean-Claude Colin

== History ==
Pompallier College is named after Bishop Jean Baptiste Pompallier who led the first group of Catholic Missionaries to New Zealand, arriving in the Hokianga with Fr Servant and Br Michel a Marist Priest and Brother in 1838. He was the first Catholic Bishop of New Zealand; Bishop Pompallier of the Diocese of Auckland.

The school was founded in 1971 after fund-raising among Northland parishes. It started as a private Boys' Boarding School owned and administered by the Society of Mary. The school became co-educational in 1977, closed the boarding facility in 1981 and in the same year became a state-integrated secondary school owned by the Diocese of Auckland and administered by a board of trustees. An Attached Intermediate was opened in 1995 and Form 1–7 status was achieved in 1997. It is now known as a Year 7–13 state-integrated co-educational secondary school.

== Principals ==
- Fr Brian Wysocki SM (1971 - 1974) (foundation principal)
- Fr Phil Roberts SM (1974 - ?)
- Fr Des Darby SM (? - ?)
- Fr Jim Gresham SM (? - ?)
- Mr Connor Seakins (? - ?)
- Mrs Madeline Armstrong (2005-2008)
- Mr Richard Stanton (2009 - 2024)
- Ms Chris Allen (acting principal, May–September 2024)
- Mr Hayden Kingdon (2024–present)

== Controversies ==
In August 2012, principal Richard Stanton published an article in the school newsletter which opposed Louisa Wall's Marriage (Definition of Marriage) Amendment Bill, which would legalise same-sex marriage in New Zealand. A staff member was suspended, and later dismissed, for supporting a pro-gay marriage protest the students were having, due to the article written in the newsletter. Some students and parents also protested against the article.

== Notable alumni ==
- Simon France (1958–2023), judge of the High Court (2005–2022) and Court of Appeal (2022–2023)
- Cameron Leslie MNZM (born 1990) - paralympics swimmer and wheelchair rugby player.
- Moko Tepania (born 1991), teacher, Mayor of the Far North (2022–present)
- Derren Witcombe (born 1978), rugby union player, All Black (2005)
