= Ian Dunn (rugby union) =

- Born: Ian Thomas Wayne Dunn; 11 June 1960 (age 66) Te Kōpuru, New Zealand
- Height: 1.76 m (5 ft 9 in)
- Weight: 73 kg (161 lb)
- School: Dargaville High School
- University: N/A
- Notable relative: Eddie Dunn (brother)

Rugby union career
- Position: First five-eighth
Provincial / State sides
Years	Team	Apps	(Points)
1980–90	North Auckland	95	
International career
Years	Team	Apps	(Points)
1980	New Zealand Colts		(0)
1980–84	New Zealand Māori		
1983–84	New Zealand	3	

Ian Thomas Wayne Dunn (born 11 June 1960) is a former New Zealand rugby union player. A first five-eighth, Dunn represented North Auckland at a provincial level, and was a member of the New Zealand national side, the All Blacks, in 1983 and 1984. He played 13 matches for the All Blacks including three internationals.
