= Derren Witcombe =

- Born: Derren John Charles Witcombe; 30 October 1978 (age 48) Hobart, Australia
- Height: 1.85 m (6 ft 1 in)
- Weight: 108 kg (238 lb)

Rugby union career
- Position: Hooker
Amateur team(s)
Years	Team	Apps	(Points)
- Hora Hora
Provincial / State sides
Years	Team	Apps	(Points)
2001–02	Northland	20	
2003–06	Auckland	30	
Super Rugby
Years	Team	Apps	(Points)
2002–07	Blues	53	(15)
International career
Years	Team	Apps	(Points)
2005	New Zealand	5	(0)
2007	Junior All Blacks		
Coaching career
- Years: Team
- 2013–14, 17–: Northland
- 2015–16: Mitsubishi Sagamihara DynaBoars

Derren John Charles Witcombe (born 30 October 1978) is an Australian-born New Zealand rugby union coach and former player. He played as a hooker.

== Playing career ==
Witcombe grew up on a dry stock farm in Taupo Bay before attending high school in Whangarei. He was educated at Pompallier Catholic College where he pursued both Rugby and Cricket.

He went on to work in forestry for four years, playing both Rugby and Cricket at club level.

He played Cricket for the Northland province as a wicket keeper/batsman.

Witcombe represented the Hora Hora club and Northland, making his provincial debut in 2001. He later played for Grammar Carlton and Auckland. He played at Super Rugby level for the Blues between 2002 and 2007, winning the Super 12 title with them in 2003.

He appeared in 5 test matches for the All Blacks in 2005 including two wins over the British & Irish Lions.

Witcombe retired from playing in 2007 due to a neck injury.

== Coaching career ==
Witcombe took up coaching and was appointed head coach of Northland in the 2013 and 2014 National Provincial Championships. He departed suddenly in early 2015 to take up a position at Japanese club Mitsubishi Sagamihara DynaBoars.

In February 2017, returned to the Northland province as head coach for the 2017 Mitre 10 Cup. He coached them for the 2017 to 2019 seasons.

While in charge of Northland the team's results were:

- 2013 ITM Cup - 10 games, 2 wins, 1 draw, 7 losses - 6th in Championship.
- 2014 ITM Cup - 11 games, 5 wins, 0 draws, 6 losses - 3rd in Championship. Lost 21-26 to Hawke's Bay in the semi final.
- 2017 Mitre 10 Cup - 11 games, 5 wins, 0 draws, 6 losses - 4th in Championship. Lost 21-49 to Wellington in the semi final.
- 2018 Mitre 10 Cup - 11 games, 4 wins, 0 draws, 7 losses - 4th in Championship. Lost 26-48 to Waikato in the semi final.
- 2018 Mitre 10 Cup - 10 games, 2 wins, 0 draws, 8 losses - 6th in Championship.

He resigned as Northland coach after the 2019 season.
