= Northland Rugby Union =

New Zealand rugby governing body

Northland Rugby
- Sport: Rugby union
- Jurisdiction: Northland Region
- Abbreviation: NRU
- Founded: 1920; 106 years ago
- Affiliation: New Zealand Rugby
- Headquarters: Whangārei
- CEO: Paul Lennane
- Men's coach: Ryan Martin
- Women's coach: Janna Vaughan

Official website
- www.taniwha.co.nz
- (New Zealand)

The Northland Rugby Union is the governing body for rugby union in Northland, New Zealand; Northland is a region of New Zealand that covers areas in the districts of Far North, Kaipara, Whangārei, as well as Wellsford and Tomarata in Auckland Region. Established in 1920, they are represented by the NPC side, Northland Taniwha, and Farah Palmer Cup side, Northland Kauri. The union was formerly known as North Auckland.

Northland is affiliated with the Blues Super Rugby franchise. Their home playing colours are a sky blue (Pantone 284) and they play their home games at Semenoff Stadium in Morningside, Whangārei.

== History ==
=== Early years ===
Rugby union was first played in Northland in late 1880, and the first union was set up in 1895, known as the Marsden Football Union.

They played their first ever match as a union on 3 August 1920, in an 11-0 victory over South Island Country. However, they did not play their first inter-union match until 27 July 1922, an 8-6 loss to Auckland. Their first inter-union win came in August 1923, when they beat King Country

The province became known as the North Auckland Rugby Union following the amalgamation of Whangārei, Northern Wairoa, Bay of Islands, and Otamatea in 1920. In 1925, the union expanded to include Mangonui, Kaipara, Hokianga, Whangaroa, and Rodney. Auckland and North Auckland became regular rivals after a tightly fought game in 1922, which Auckland won 8-6.

In 1994, North Auckland changed its name to the Northland Rugby Football Union.

=== Professional era ===
Northland began their professional era playing in the inaugural Air New Zealand Cup competition. They are known as the Taniwha, a reference to the mascot adopted in the professional era. Along with Auckland and North Harbour, Northland is part of the Blues Super Rugby franchise.

Northland won the Ranfurly Shield in 2026 when they defeated Canterbury.

== Club rugby ==
There are currently 39 registered clubs incorporated and secondary schools affiliated with the Northland Rugby Union, most of which have teams at both senior and junior levels.

- Awanui Rugby Football Club
- Dargaville High School
- Eastern United Rugby & Sports Club
- The Hora Hora Rugby Union Football Club
- Kaeo Rugby and Sports Club
- Kaihu Valley Rugby Football Club
- Kaikohe Rugby Football and Sports Club
- Kaitaia City Rugby Union Football Club
- Kaitaia College
- Kamo High School
- Kamo Rugby and Squash Club
- Kerikeri High School
- Kerikeri Rugby Union Football Club
- Mangakahia Rugby Club
- Mid-Northern Rugby Football Club
- Midwestern Rugby Union And Squash Club
- Moerewa Rugby Football and Recreation Sports Club
- Northland College
- Old Boys Marist Rugby & Sports Club
- Old Boys Rugby Football & Softball Club
- Onerahi Rugby Football Club
- Otamatea Hawks Rugby Club
- Rodney College
- Taiamai Ohaeawai Rugby Football and Sports Club
- Te Rarawa Rugby Club
- The Aupouri Rugby Football and Sports Club
- The City Rugby Union Football Club
- The Dargaville Rugby and Sports Club
- The Hikurangi Rugby Union Football Club
- The Okaihau Rugby Union Football and Sports Club
- The Otiria Rugby Union Football and Sports Club
- The Southern Football Club
- The Tomarata Rugby Football Club
- Tikipunga Rugby Club
- United Kawakawa Rugby Football Club
- Waipu Rugby Squash Club
- Wellsford Rugby Football Club
- Whangārei Boys' High School
- Whangaruru Rugby Football Club

=== Club champions ===
Joe Morgan Memorial Trophy

- 2026 - Mid Northern 43 - 24 Western Sharks
- 2025 - Mid Northern 56 -12 Western Sharks
- 2024 - Kamo 26 - 20 Western Sharks
- 2023 - Mid Northern 26 - 12 Kamo
- 2022 - Mid Northern 53 - 19 Waipu

== Provincial rugby ==
=== National Provincial Championship ===
The following is a summary of every season for the Northland Taniwha since 2006.

Year	Captain	Head Coach	Played	Won	Drawn	Lost	Points	Position	Finals
2006	David Holwell	Mark Anscombe	9	3	1	5	14	10th overall	
2007	Justin Collins	Mark Anscombe	10	3	1	6	19	10th overall	
2008	Justin Collins	Mark Anscombe	10	4	0	6	22	9th overall	
2009	Jared Payne	Bryce Woodward	13	3	1	9	16	13th overall	
2010	Jared Payne	Bryce Woodward	13	5	0	8	29	10th overall	
2011	Jared Payne	Adriaan Ferris	10	4	0	6	19	5th in Championship	
2012	Rene Ranger	Adriaan Ferris	10	3	0	7	17	5th in Championship	
2013	Rene Ranger	Derren Witcombe	10	2	1	7	13	6th in Championship	
2014	Cameron Eyre	Derren Witcombe	11	5	0	6	25	3rd in Championship	Lost 21-26 to Hawke's Bay in semi final
2015	Matt Moulds	Richie Harris	10	0	0	10	1	7th in Championship	
2016	Matt Moulds	Richie Harris	10	1	0	9	11	6th in Championship	
2017	Matt Moulds	Derren Witcombe	11	5	0	6	25	4th in Championship	Lost 21-49 to Wellington in semi final
2018	Matt Moulds	Derren Witcombe	11	4	0	7	24	4th in Championship	Lost 26-48 to Waikato in semi final
2019	Jordan Olsen	Derren Witcombe	10	2	0	8	11	6th in Championship	
2020	Jordan Olsen	George Konia	12	6	0	6	24	3rd in Championship	Beat Otago 32-19 in semi final. Lost 24-36 to Hawke's Bay in final
2021	Jordan Olsen	George Konia	9	1	0	8	12	5th in Championship	
2022	Matt Moulds	George Konia	10	6	0	4	27	4th in conference	Lost 16-23 to Canterbury in quarter final
2023	Matt Matich & Rob Rush	John Leslie	10	2	1	7	17	12th overall	
2024	Matt Moulds	Dale MacLeod	10	2	0	8	15	13th overall	
2025	Matt Moulds	Ryan Martin	10	5	1	4	25	9th overall	
2026	Rivez Reihana	Ryan Martin	10	7	0	3	38	2nd overall	Beat Tasman 26-21 in quarter final, beat Otago 38-19 in semi-final and lost 24-43 to Canterbury in the grand final

=== Ranfurly Shield ===
North Auckland won the Ranfurly Shield on four occasions:

- 1950 when they defeated South Canterbury
- 1960 when they defeated Auckland
- 1971 when they defeated Auckland
- 1978 when they defeated Manawatu.

In the 1971 challenge Northland won 17-12 in a narrow match played in front of 47,000 people at Eden Park, Auckland. The following season 40,000 spectators packed Whangārei Okara Park to watch the rematch. With the city's population only 34,000, this showcased the significance of both the shield and the rivalry with Auckland. However they lost 15-16.

There was some controversy after the 12-10 victory over Manawatu in 1978. North Auckland kicked a winning penalty well after the 80 minute mark as the referee, Bill Adlam of Wanganui, allowed a large amount of stoppage time. The Union subsequently refused to put the shield on the line for its final home matches of the season against Southland and Otago. However, despite the ill-feeling of many in the rugby community, no rules were broken.

In August 2026 Northland easily beat Canterbury by 36-12 to take the Ranfurly Shield, ending a 48 year period since the Union had held the Shield. They then defended the Shield against Tasman 20-10and Waikato 34-17. However, Northland were unable to retain the Shield for the summer, succumbing by 19-22 to Counties Manukau

== All Blacks ==
Northland has produced 32 All Blacks to date. Below is a list of Northland New Zealand national rugby union players along with their All Black number, year of debut, and number of All Black games.

#	Player	Debut	Caps
240	Charles Fletcher	1921	1
305	Innes Finlayson	1925	36
364	Bill Heke	1929	6
367	Alf Waterman	1929	7
461	Johnny Smith	1946	9
482	Peter Smith	1947	3
518	Nau Cherrington	1950	7
541	Ian Irvine	1952	1
556	Peter Jones	1953	37
605	Des Webb	1959	1
621	Victor Yates	1961	9
655	Sid Going	1967	86
681	Bevan Holmes	1970	31
682	Richie Guy	1971	9
700	Hamish Macdonald	1972	48
723	Murray Jones	1973	5
726	Peter Sloane	1973	16
733	Joe Morgan	1974	22
742	Ken Going	1974	3
790	Eddie Dunn	1978	20
800	Mike Burgoyne	1979	6
822	Fred Woodman	1980	14
829	Wayne Neville	1981	4
835	Ian Dunn	1983	13
844	Alastair Robinson	1983	4
855	Kawhena Woodman	1984	6
877	Michael Speight	1986	5
902	Ian Jones	1989	105
930	Glenn Taylor	1992	6
976	Norm Berryman	1998	1
1106	Rene Ranger	2010	6
1165	Jack Goodhue	2017	19
