= Maunu, New Zealand =

Maunu
- Suburb
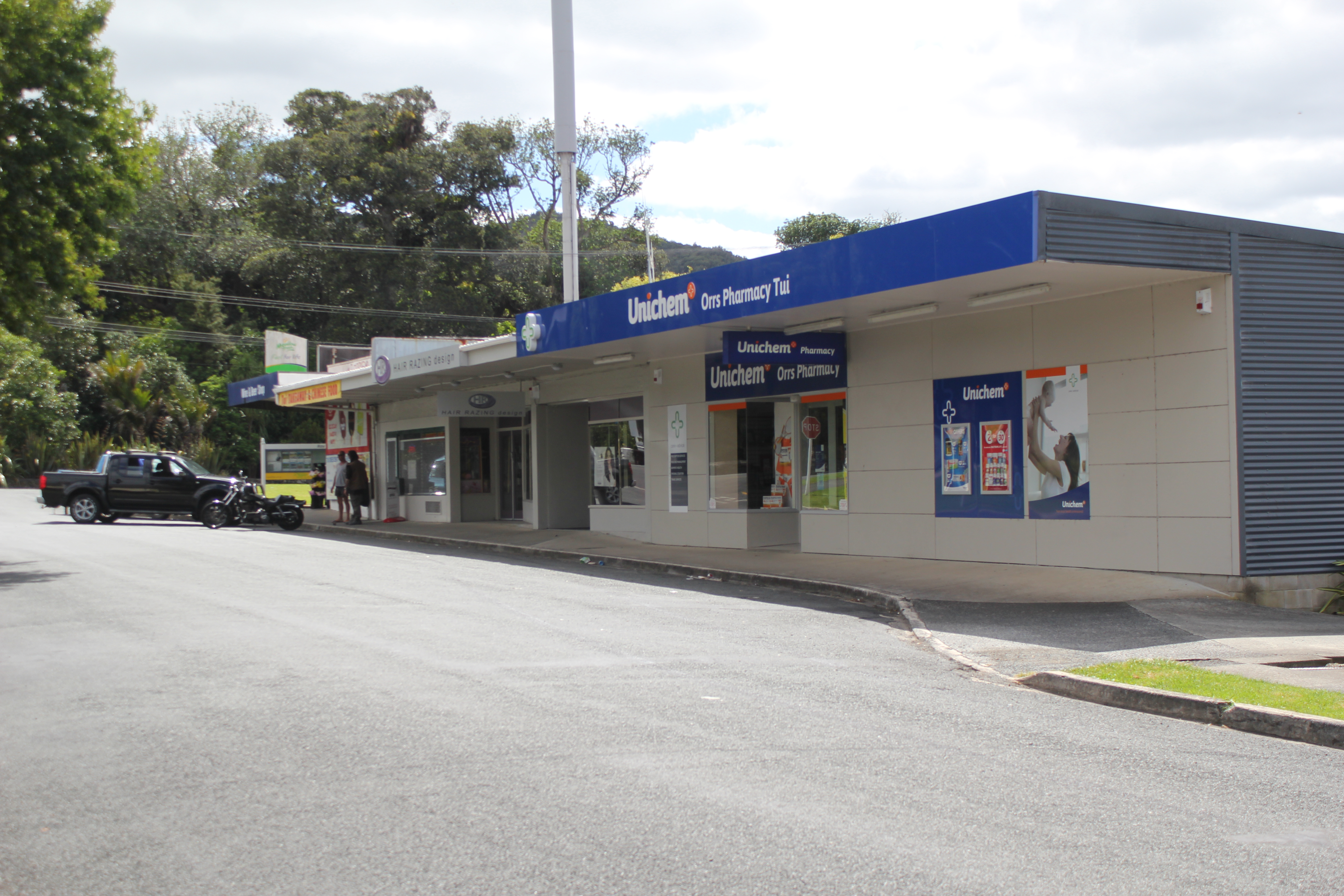
- The small block of shops at Tui Crescent
- Interactive map of Maunu
- Coordinates: 35°44′36″S 174°16′38″E
- Country: New Zealand
- City: Whangarei
- Electoral ward: Mangakahia-Maungatapere Ward; Whangārei Urban Ward

Area
  - Land: 565 ha (1,400 acres)

Population (June 2025)
  - Total: 2,960
  - Density: 524/km^{2} (1,360/sq mi)
- Postcode: 0110

	Woodhill	Horahora
Maungatapere	Maunu	Raumanga
Otaika Valley	Otaika	Morningside

Maunu is a suburb in the south west of Whangārei in Northland, New Zealand. A volcanic hill to the west is also called Maunu and has a peak 395 m above sea level. State Highway 14 runs through the suburb.

== Demographics ==
Before the 2023 census, Maunu and Horahora were in the same statistical area, which extended west beyond the Whangārei urban area into part of what is now the Pukenui statistical area.

Maunu covers 5.65 km^{2} (2.18 sq mi) and had an estimated population of 2,960 as of June 2025, with a population density of 524 people per km^{2}.

Historical population
Year	Pop.	±% p.a.
2013	2,244	—
2018	2,493	+2.13%
2023	2,811	+2.43%

Maunu had a population of 2,811 in the 2023 New Zealand census, an increase of 318 people (12.8%) since the 2018 census, and an increase of 567 people (25.3%) since the 2013 census. There were 1,305 males, 1,500 females and 6 people of other genders in 990 dwellings. 2.5% of people identified as LGBTIQ+. The median age was 44.4 years (compared with 38.1 years nationally). There were 567 people (20.2%) aged under 15 years, 345 (12.3%) aged 15 to 29, 1,140 (40.6%) aged 30 to 64, and 753 (26.8%) aged 65 or older.

People could identify as more than one ethnicity. The results were 78.2% European (Pākehā); 15.0% Māori; 2.7% Pasifika; 15.0% Asian; 1.4% Middle Eastern, Latin American and African New Zealanders (MELAA); and 1.9% other, which includes people giving their ethnicity as "New Zealander". English was spoken by 96.2%, Māori language by 3.1%, Samoan by 0.3%, and other languages by 14.4%. No language could be spoken by 1.9% (e.g. too young to talk). New Zealand Sign Language was known by 0.4%. The percentage of people born overseas was 28.8, compared with 28.8% nationally.

Religious affiliations were 39.7% Christian, 2.7% Hindu, 0.5% Islam, 0.7% Māori religious beliefs, 0.4% Buddhist, 0.7% New Age, 0.1% Jewish, and 2.1% other religions. People who answered that they had no religion were 45.4%, and 7.8% of people did not answer the census question.

Of those at least 15 years old, 450 (20.1%) people had a bachelor's or higher degree, 1,116 (49.7%) had a post-high school certificate or diploma, and 498 (22.2%) people exclusively held high school qualifications. The median income was $37,900, compared with $41,500 nationally. 297 people (13.2%) earned over $100,000 compared to 12.1% nationally. The employment status of those at least 15 was that 972 (43.3%) people were employed full-time, 273 (12.2%) were part-time, and 15 (0.7%) were unemployed.

=== Pukenui ===
The statistical area of Pukenui covers rural areas sometimes called Maunu to the west of the Whangārei urban area. Pukenui covers 16.13 km^{2} (6.23 sq mi) and had an estimated population of 1,520 as of June 2025, with a population density of 94 people per km^{2}.

Historical population for Pukenui
Year	Pop.	±% p.a.
2006	1,302	—
2013	993	−3.80%
2018	1,239	+4.53%
2023	1,482	+3.65%
The 2006 population is for a larger area of 19.19 km^{2} Source:

Pukenui had a population of 1,482 in the 2023 New Zealand census, an increase of 243 people (19.6%) since the 2018 census, and an increase of 489 people (49.2%) since the 2013 census. There were 705 males, 771 females and 3 people of other genders in 501 dwellings. 2.4% of people identified as LGBTIQ+. The median age was 45.2 years (compared with 38.1 years nationally). There were 303 people (20.4%) aged under 15 years, 186 (12.6%) aged 15 to 29, 702 (47.4%) aged 30 to 64, and 285 (19.2%) aged 65 or older.

People could identify as more than one ethnicity. The results were 88.5% European (Pākehā); 16.4% Māori; 1.8% Pasifika; 6.9% Asian; 1.2% Middle Eastern, Latin American and African New Zealanders (MELAA); and 3.6% other, which includes people giving their ethnicity as "New Zealander". English was spoken by 97.2%, Māori language by 2.4%, and other languages by 9.1%. No language could be spoken by 2.0% (e.g. too young to talk). New Zealand Sign Language was known by 0.2%. The percentage of people born overseas was 21.7, compared with 28.8% nationally.

Religious affiliations were 36.2% Christian, 0.6% Hindu, 1.0% Māori religious beliefs, 0.4% Buddhist, 0.4% New Age, 0.2% Jewish, and 1.6% other religions. People who answered that they had no religion were 53.4%, and 6.1% of people did not answer the census question.

Of those at least 15 years old, 249 (21.1%) people had a bachelor's or higher degree, 657 (55.7%) had a post-high school certificate or diploma, and 192 (16.3%) people exclusively held high school qualifications. The median income was $52,000, compared with $41,500 nationally. 234 people (19.8%) earned over $100,000 compared to 12.1% nationally. The employment status of those at least 15 was that 624 (52.9%) people were employed full-time, 177 (15.0%) were part-time, and 24 (2.0%) were unemployed.

== Education ==
Pompallier Catholic College is a secondary (years 7-13) school with a roll of 650 students as of July 2026. It was founded in 1971 as a private boys' boarding school but became coeducational in 1977. In 1981 it closed the boarding facilities and became state integrated.

Maunu School is a contributing primary (years 1–6) school with a roll of 311 students as of July 2026. The school was established in 1884.

Both schools are coeducational.

== Features ==
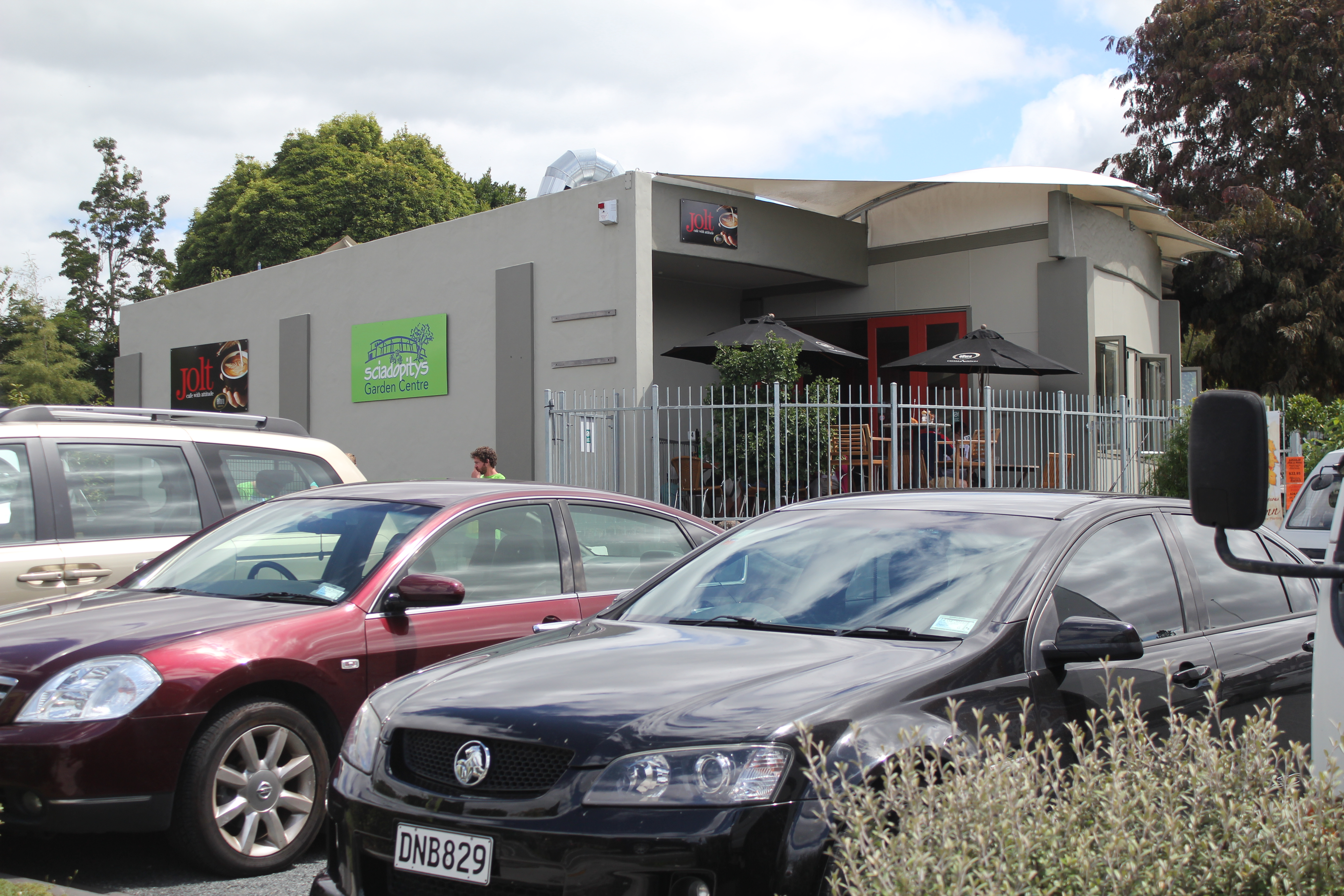
Jolt café as seen from the Sciadopity's Garden Centre carpark.

Barge Park Showgrounds on State Highway 14 is used for A&P shows, equestrian events and recreation.

There is a shopping complex on Tui Crescent, this includes a dairy, a pharmacy, and a takeaway shop.

There is also a cemetery located on 49 Cemetery Road. Maunu was first surveyed to be a cemetery in November 1892. In 1898 two hectares of land was vested in to the Maunu Cemetery Trusties until January 1922 when the Whangarei Borough Council took control. There have since been more additions to the cemetery.

=== Kiwi North ===
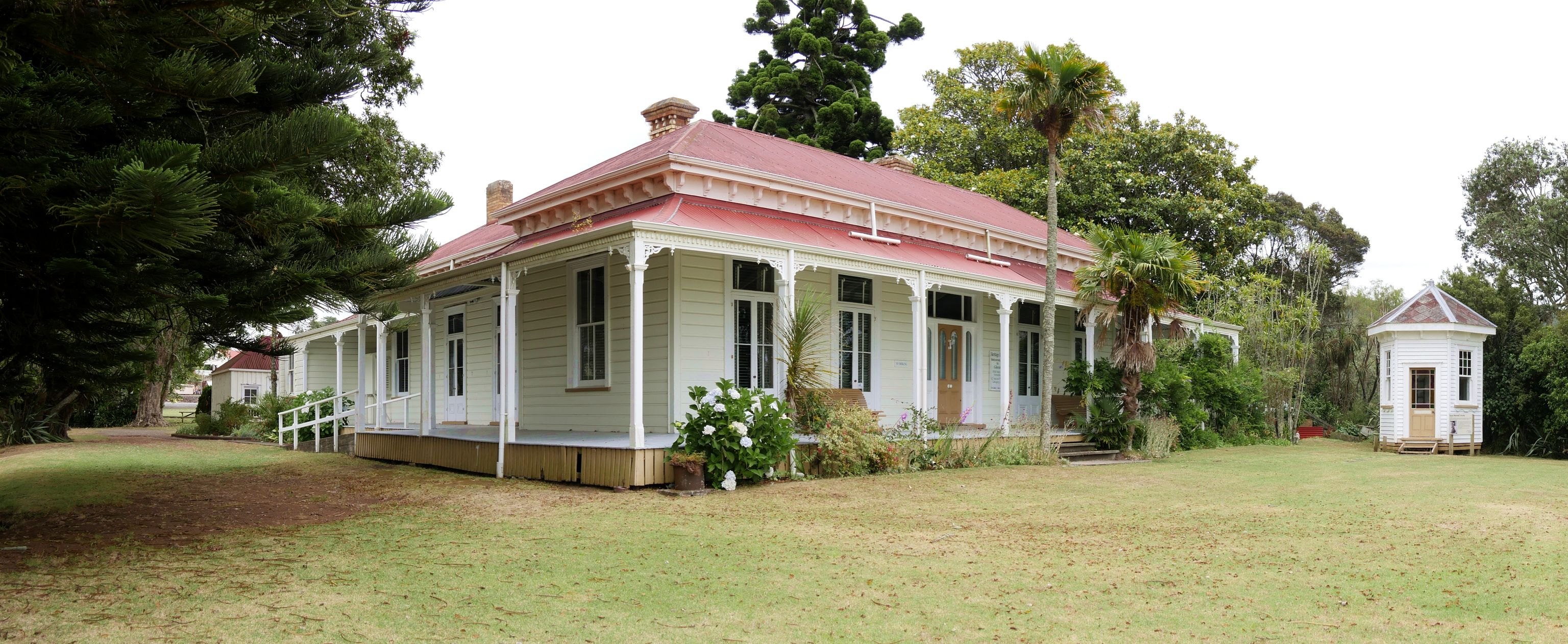
Clarke Homestead

The Kiwi North precinct, located in Maunu, features the Whangarei Museum founded in 1890.

The site also includes Tuatara, Kiwi House and Heritage Park, incorporating the Clarke Homestead and other historical buildings relocated from around Whangārei, the Northland Observatory, a garden centre and cafe, and various clubs and societies. The precinct features train rides and other events.
