= Joe Morgan (rugby union) =

NZ international rugby union player (1945–2002)

- Born: Joseph Edmund Morgan; 7 August 1945 Whangārei, New Zealand
- Died: 22 December 2002 (aged 57) Whangārei, New Zealand
- Height: 1.78 m (5 ft 10 in)
- Weight: 77 kg (170 lb)
- School: Whangarei Boys' High School
- Occupation: Carpenter

Rugby union career
- Position: Second five-eighth
Provincial / State sides
Years	Team	Apps	(Points)
1967–1981	North Auckland	165	
International career
Years	Team	Apps	(Points)
1974–1976	New Zealand	5	(4)

Joseph Edmund Morgan (7 August 1945 – 22 December 2002) was a New Zealand rugby union player. A second five-eighth, Morgan represented North Auckland at a provincial level, playing a record 165 matches for that union. He was a member of the New Zealand national side, the All Blacks, from 1974 to 1976, and appeared in 22 matches for the All Blacks including five internationals.
