= Des Webb =

New Zealand rugby union player

- Born: Desmond Stanley Webb; 10 September 1934 Kawakawa, New Zealand
- Died: 24 March 1987 (aged 52) Whangārei, New Zealand
- Height: 1.83 m (6 ft 0 in)
- Weight: 82 kg (181 lb)
- School: Gisborne Boys' High School
- University: Auckland University College
- Occupation: Lawyer

Rugby union career
- Position: Hooker
Provincial / State sides
Years	Team	Apps	(Points)
1957–1958	Auckland	15	
1959, 1961–1965	North Auckland	57	
International career
Years	Team	Apps	(Points)
1955–1958	NZ Universities	6	
1959	New Zealand	1	(0)

Desmond Stanley Webb (10 September 1934 – 24 March 1987) was a New Zealand rugby union player. A hooker, Webb represented Auckland and North Auckland at a provincial level. He played just one match for the New Zealand national side, the All Blacks, a test against the touring British Lions in 1959.
