= Port Whangārei =

- Suburb
- Interactive map of Port Whangārei
- Coordinates: 35.745°S 174.346°E
- Country: New Zealand
- City: Whangārei
- Local authority: Whangarei District Council
- Electoral ward: Whangārei Urban Ward

Area
  - Land: 681 ha (1,680 acres)

Population (June 2025)
  - Total: 100
  - Density: 15/km^{2} (38/sq mi)

Morningside	Riverside	Parahaki
Raumanga	Port Whangārei	Onerahi
Oakleigh	(Whangārei Harbour)	Onerahi

Port Whangārei (Māori: Kioreroa) is an industrial area of Whangārei, in Northland Region, New Zealand. It is southeast of the city centre, connected by a bridge across Limeburners Creek. It was once called Kioreroa. The southernmost part of the area contains Port Nikau which has commercial buildings and recreational, commercial and superyacht berths.

== History ==
One of the early cemeteries for Whangārei was Kioreroa Cemetery, on the western part of what is now Port Whangārei. It was used from 1882 to 1946.

The area was developed from the 1920s as Whangārei's port, and in the mid-1960s it was the ninth-busiest port in New Zealand. It needed more space to handle the increasing size of ships, and Northport was developed at Marsden Point to replace it, with the transition complete in 2007.

There has been a suggestion that the Royal New Zealand Navy might establish a base at Port Whangārei.

== Demographics ==
The statistical area of Port-Limeburners, which includes a slightly larger area than Port Whangārei, covers 6.81 km^{2} (2.63 sq mi) and had an estimated population of 100 as of June 2025, with a population density of 14.7 people per km^{2}.

Historical population
Year	Pop.	±% p.a.
2006	51	—
2013	39	−3.76%
2018	102	+21.20%
2023	84	−3.81%
The 2006 population is for a larger area of 7.41 km^{2} Source:

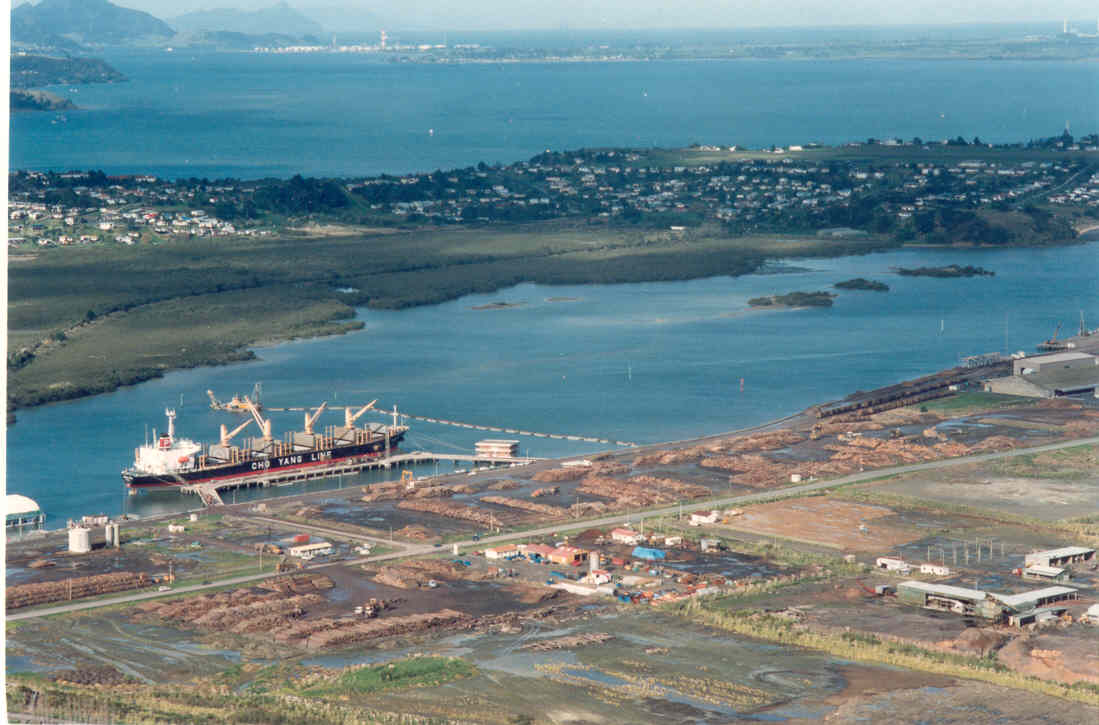
Port Whangārei and Whangārei Harbour in 1993

Port-Limeburners had a population of 84 in the 2023 New Zealand census, a decrease of 18 people (−17.6%) since the 2018 census, and an increase of 45 people (115.4%) since the 2013 census. There were 51 males and 33 females in 69 dwellings. 7.1% of people identified as LGBTIQ+. The median age was 55.9 years (compared with 38.1 years nationally). There were 6 people (7.1%) aged under 15 years, 15 (17.9%) aged 15 to 29, 39 (46.4%) aged 30 to 64, and 27 (32.1%) aged 65 or older.

People could identify as more than one ethnicity. The results were 85.7% European (Pākehā), 21.4% Māori, and 7.1% Asian. English was spoken by 100.0%, and other languages by 25.0%. The percentage of people born overseas was 46.4, compared with 28.8% nationally.

Religious affiliations were 21.4% Christian, and 3.6% other religions. People who answered that they had no religion were 60.7%, and 10.7% of people did not answer the census question.

Of those at least 15 years old, 12 (15.4%) people had a bachelor's or higher degree, 24 (30.8%) had a post-high school certificate or diploma, and 36 (46.2%) people exclusively held high school qualifications. The median income was $33,100, compared with $41,500 nationally. The employment status of those at least 15 was that 33 (42.3%) people were employed full-time, 6 (7.7%) were part-time, and 3 (3.8%) were unemployed.
