= Dargaville High School =

Secondary school in Dargaville, New Zealand

Location
- 57 Plunket Street, Dargaville 0310, New Zealand; 35°55′54″S 173°52′05″E

Information
- Type: State, co-educational, secondary school (years 9–13)
- Ministry of Education Institution no.: 19
- Principal: Michael Houghton
- Enrolment: 405 (July 2026)
- Website: www.dargavillehighschool.co.nz

Dargaville High School is a state co-educational secondary school located in Dargaville, Northland, New Zealand, established in 1921. A total of 405 students from years 9 to 13 (ages 13 to 18) attend Dargaville High School as of July 2026.

== History ==
Dargaville High School was established in 1921.

In 2021 the school's building academy constructed a state house for Kāinga Ora. The house was built on-site in Dargaville and relocated to Kaitaia.

In June 2025, a commissioner was appointed at the school following a damning ERO report.

== Enrolment ==
As of July 2026, Dargaville High School has a roll of 405 students, of which 213 (52.6%) identify as Māori.

As of 2026, the school has an Equity Index of 515, placing it amongst schools whose students have many socioeconomic barriers to achievement.

== Notable alumni ==
- Eddie Dunn – rugby union player
- Ian Dunn – rugby union player
- Dion Nash – cricketer
- Winston Peters – politician
- Glenn Taylor – rugby union player
- Mark Taylor – rugby union player
- Jock Wells – rugby union player
