= William Mackenzie Fraser =

New Zealand politician, conservationist (1878–1960)

William Mackenzie Fraser (6 April 1878 – 13 September 1960) was a New Zealand labourer, civil engineer, local politician, conservationist and ethnological collector. He was born in Auckland, Auckland, New Zealand on 6 April 1878.
