= Don Max (rugby union) =

- Born: Donald Stanfield Max; 7 March 1906 Nelson, New Zealand
- Died: 4 March 1972 (aged 65) Brightwater, New Zealand
- Height: 1.88 m (6 ft 2 in)
- Weight: 99 kg (218 lb)
- School: Nelson College
- Occupation: Farmer

Rugby union career
- Position(s): Lock and loose forward
Provincial / State sides
Years	Team	Apps	(Points)
1924–35	Nelson	45	
1930	Nelson–Marlborough–	1	
- Motueka-Golden Bay
1931	Seddon Shield Unions	1	
1931–33	South Island	3	
International career
Years	Team	Apps	(Points)
1931–34	New Zealand	3	(3)

Donald Stanfield Max (7 March 1906 – 4 March 1972) was a New Zealand rugby union player. A lock and loose forward, Max represented Nelson at a provincial level, and was a member of the New Zealand national side, the All Blacks, from 1931 to 1934. He played eight matches for the All Blacks including three internationals. After his retirement as a player, Max was active as an administrator. He was president of the New Zealand Rugby Union from May 1949 to April 1950, when he was succeeded by John Finlayson.

In 2009, Max was inducted into the Nelson Legends of Sport gallery.
