= Hora Hora RFC =

(New Zealand) Hora Hora
- Full name: Hora Hora Rugby Football Club
- Union: NRFU
- Founded: 1920 as Hora hora Old Boys. Name changed 1928
- Region: Blues
- Ground(s): Hora Hora Park, Te Mai Road, Whangārei, New Zealand
- League: NRFU South Zone Premier Competition

Hora Hora RFC (also known as Hora Hora) is a rugby club based in Whangārei, New Zealand. Hora Hora is affiliated to the New Zealand Rugby Football Union (NZRU) via the Northland Rugby Football Union (NRFU) and Whangarei City Sub-union.

== Location ==
Hora Hora play their home games at Hora Hora Park located on Te Mai Road, Whangārei, New Zealand.

== Club colours ==
The club colours are maroon & gold.

The Hora Hora playing strip consists of a predominantly maroon jersey with wide gold hoop, maroon shorts and maroon socks with a gold top.

== Competitions ==
The Premier team participates in the NRFU South Zone Premier Competition.

In 2014, Hora Hora RFC won the Southern Districts Bayleys Premier Rugby league title, winning 19 out of 20 matches during the season.

== Notable players ==
- (New Zealand) AB Glen Taylor
- (New Zealand) AB Norman Berryman
- (New Zealand) AB Norman Maxwell
- (New Zealand) AB Fred Woodman
- (New Zealand) Doug Te Puni
