= Fred Woodman =

- Born: Fred Akehurst Woodman; 10 February 1958 (age 68) Kaikohe, New Zealand
- Height: 1.78 m (5 ft 10 in)
- Weight: 79 kg (174 lb)
- School: Northland College
- Notable relative(s): Kawhena Woodman (brother); Portia Woodman (niece)

Rugby union career
- Position: Wing
Provincial / State sides
Years	Team	Apps	(Points)
1978–88	North Auckland	114	(235)
International career
Years	Team	Apps	(Points)
1978–81	New Zealand Māori		
1980–81	New Zealand	3	(0)

Fred Akehurst Woodman (born 10 February 1958) is a former New Zealand rugby union player. A wing, Woodman represented North Auckland at a provincial level, and was a member of the New Zealand national side, the All Blacks, in 1980 and 1981. He played 14 matches for the All Blacks including three internationals. His brother Kawhena Woodman was also an All Black.
