= Maungaturoto =

Maungaturoto Maungatūroto
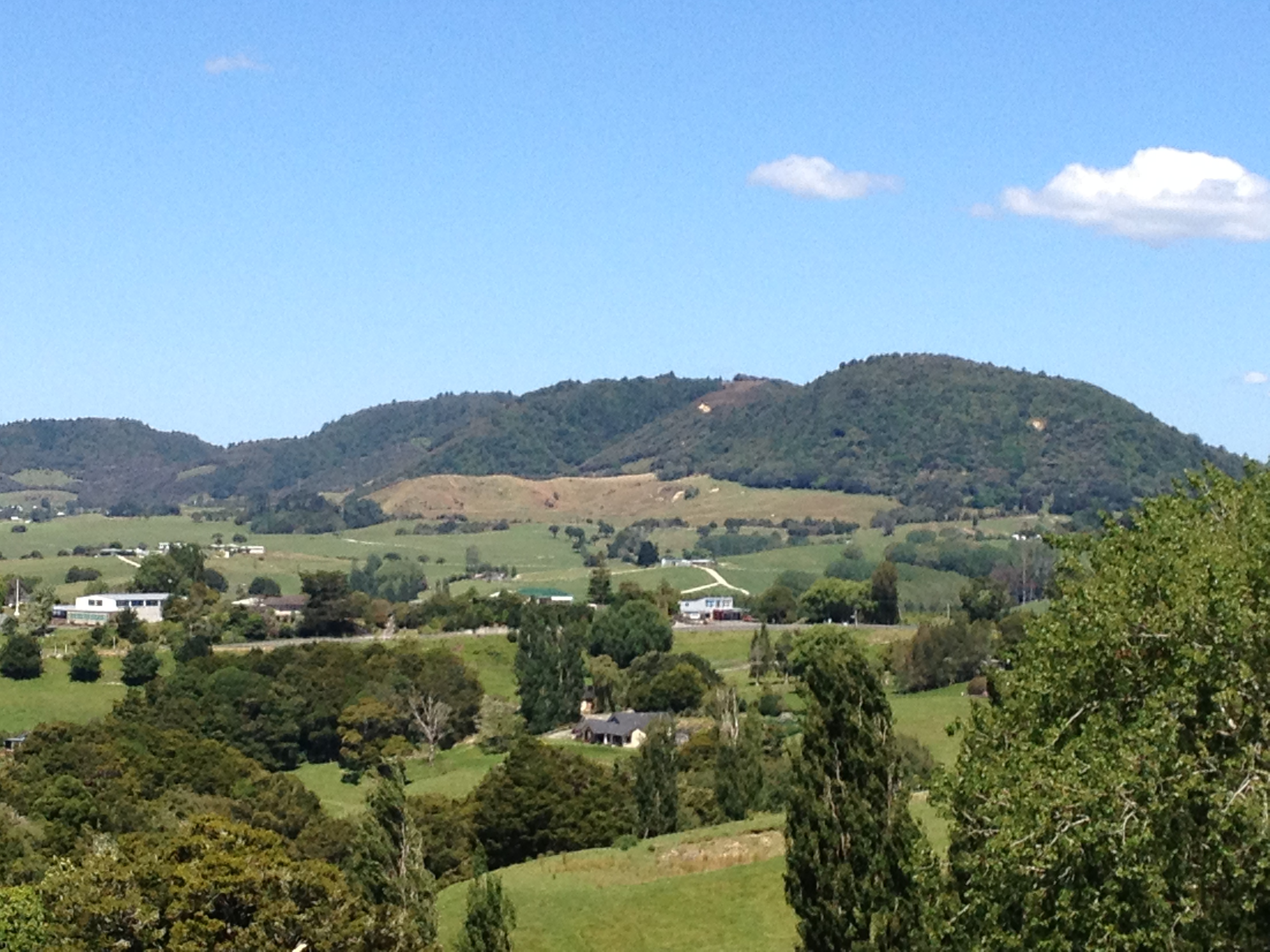
- View from the hills of Maungaturoto
- Interactive map of Maungaturoto
- Coordinates: 36°06′35″S 174°21′15″E
- Country: New Zealand
- Region: Northland Region
- District: Kaipara District
- Ward: Otamatea Ward
- Electorates: Northland; Te Tai Tokerau

Government
  - Territorial Authority: Kaipara District Council
  - Regional council: Northland Regional Council
  - Mayor of Kaipara: Jonathan Larsen
  - Northland MP: Grant McCallum
  - Te Tai Tokerau MP: TBD

Area
  - Total: 3.17 km^{2} (1.22 sq mi)

Population (June 2025)
  - Total: 950
  - Density: 300/km^{2} (780/sq mi)

Maungaturoto is a town in the Northland Region of New Zealand. Maungaturoto is located at the head of the Wairau River. State Highway 12 runs through the town.

== Geography ==
Maungaturoto is located at the head of the Wairau River. State Highway 12 runs through the town.

== History ==
Maungaturoto was settled by Albertlanders.

In 1889 there was a proposal to establish a flour mill in the Maungaturoto Gorge. Wheat farmers had to travel 18 miles (29 km) to Waipu with the roads often impassible after heavy rain.

== Demographics ==
Statistics New Zealand describes Maungatūroto as a rural settlement, which covers 3.17 km^{2} (1.22 sq mi) and had an estimated population of 950 as of June 2025, with a population density of 300 people per km^{2}. Maungatūroto is part of the larger Maungatūroto statistical area.

Historical population for Maungaturoto settlement
Year	Pop.	±% p.a.
2006	861	—
2013	792	−1.19%
2018	915	+2.93%
2023	921	+0.13%

Maungatūroto had a population of 921 in the 2023 New Zealand census, an increase of 6 people (0.7%) since the 2018 census, and an increase of 129 people (16.3%) since the 2013 census. There were 429 males, 489 females and 3 people of other genders in 330 dwellings. 2.9% of people identified as LGBTIQ+. The median age was 39.6 years (compared with 38.1 years nationally). There were 201 people (21.8%) aged under 15 years, 150 (16.3%) aged 15 to 29, 375 (40.7%) aged 30 to 64, and 192 (20.8%) aged 65 or older.

People could identify as more than one ethnicity. The results were 82.7% European (Pākehā); 29.0% Māori; 4.2% Pasifika; 3.3% Asian; 0.7% Middle Eastern, Latin American and African New Zealanders (MELAA); and 3.9% other, which includes people giving their ethnicity as "New Zealander". English was spoken by 97.7%, Māori language by 6.5%, Samoan by 0.3%, and other languages by 4.9%. No language could be spoken by 2.0% (e.g. too young to talk). New Zealand Sign Language was known by 0.3%. The percentage of people born overseas was 13.7, compared with 28.8% nationally.

Religious affiliations were 39.7% Christian, 1.0% Hindu, 0.7% Islam, 5.5% Māori religious beliefs, 0.7% Buddhist, 0.7% New Age, and 0.3% other religions. People who answered that they had no religion were 42.7%, and 9.1% of people did not answer the census question.

Of those at least 15 years old, 60 (8.3%) people had a bachelor's or higher degree, 411 (57.1%) had a post-high school certificate or diploma, and 222 (30.8%) people exclusively held high school qualifications. The median income was $34,300, compared with $41,500 nationally. 84 people (11.7%) earned over $100,000 compared to 12.1% nationally. The employment status of those at least 15 was that 309 (42.9%) people were employed full-time, 102 (14.2%) were part-time, and 15 (2.1%) were unemployed.

=== Maungatūroto statistical area ===
Maungatūroto statistical area covers 21.60 km^{2} (8.34 sq mi) and had an estimated population of 1,350 as of June 2025, with a population density of 63 people per km^{2}.

Historical population for Maungaturoto statistical area
Year	Pop.	±% p.a.
2006	1,113	—
2013	1,089	−0.31%
2018	1,269	+3.11%
2023	1,308	+0.61%

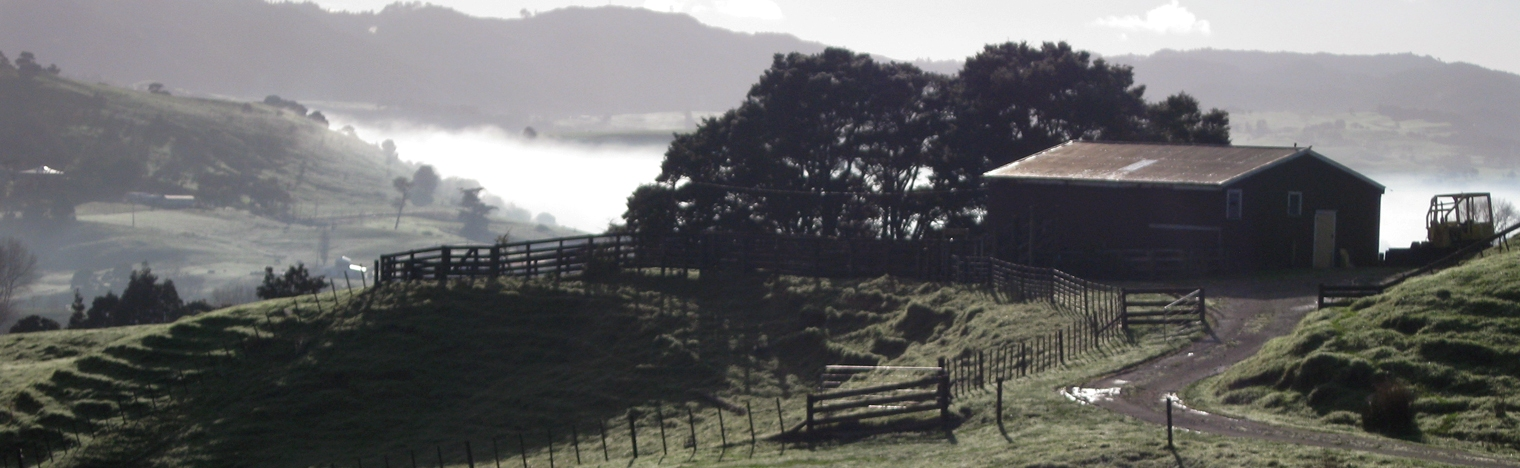
Photo taken from Gorge Road, Maungaturoto

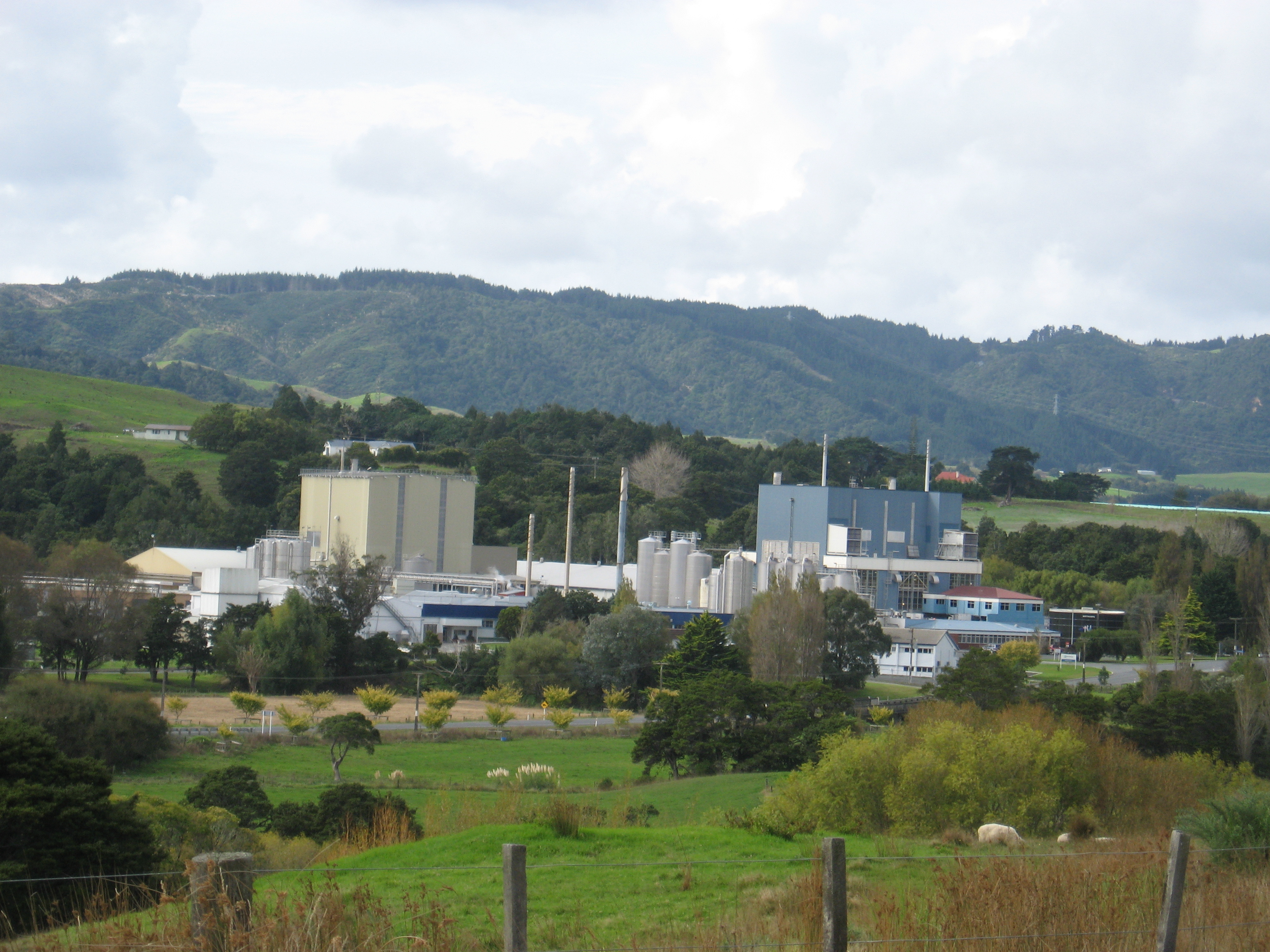
Fonterra in Maungaturoto

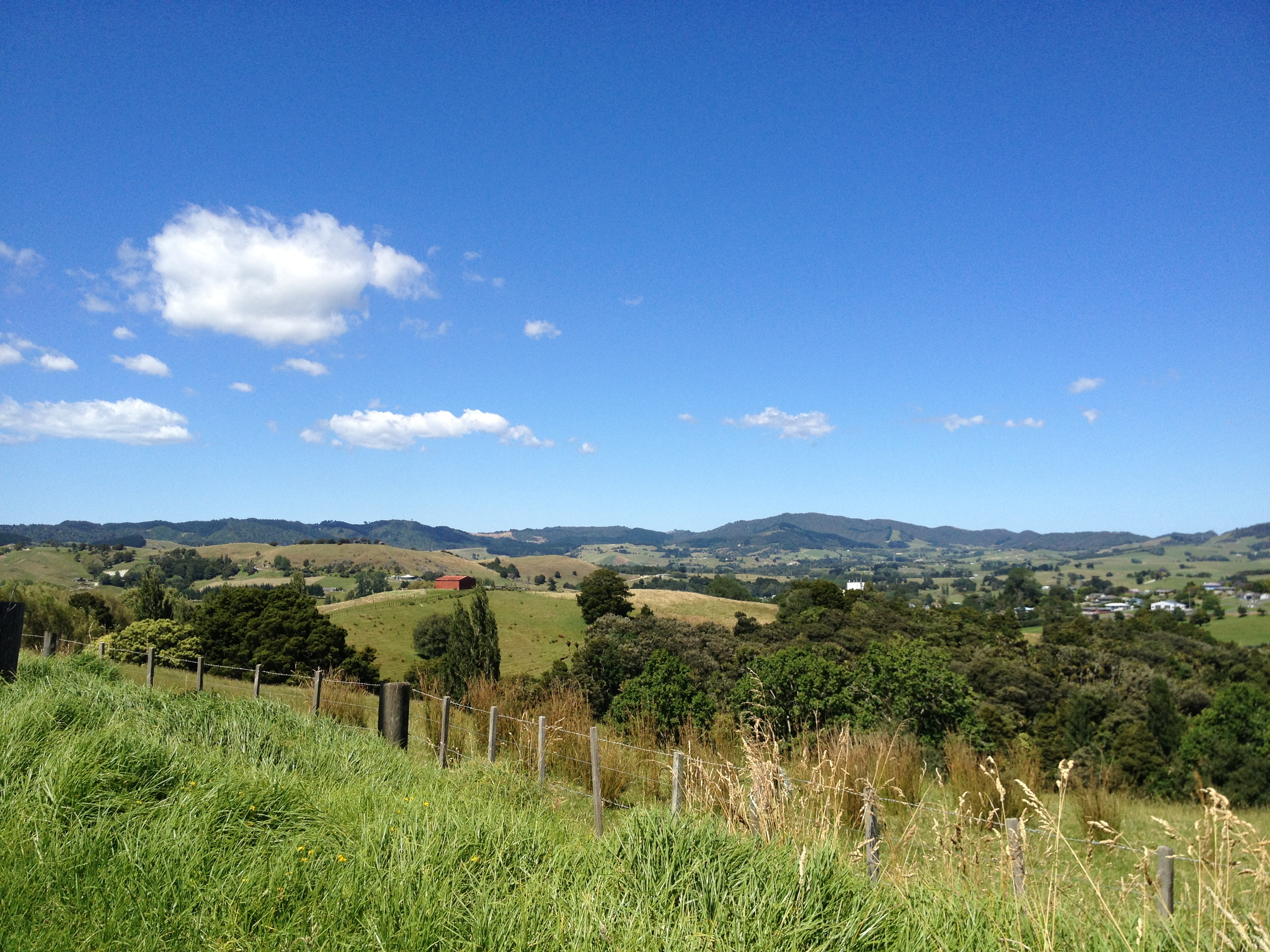
View from the Hills of Maungaturoto

Maungatūroto had a population of 1,308 in the 2023 New Zealand census, an increase of 39 people (3.1%) since the 2018 census, and an increase of 219 people (20.1%) since the 2013 census. There were 630 males, 672 females and 6 people of other genders in 465 dwellings. 2.8% of people identified as LGBTIQ+. The median age was 40.6 years (compared with 38.1 years nationally). There were 270 people (20.6%) aged under 15 years, 219 (16.7%) aged 15 to 29, 558 (42.7%) aged 30 to 64, and 264 (20.2%) aged 65 or older.

People could identify as more than one ethnicity. The results were 84.4% European (Pākehā); 26.8% Māori; 3.9% Pasifika; 3.0% Asian; 0.5% Middle Eastern, Latin American and African New Zealanders (MELAA); and 3.0% other, which includes people giving their ethnicity as "New Zealander". English was spoken by 97.9%, Māori language by 6.4%, Samoan by 0.2%, and other languages by 4.8%. No language could be spoken by 1.6% (e.g. too young to talk). New Zealand Sign Language was known by 0.2%. The percentage of people born overseas was 13.3, compared with 28.8% nationally.

Religious affiliations were 38.3% Christian, 0.7% Hindu, 0.5% Islam, 4.1% Māori religious beliefs, 0.2% Buddhist, 1.1% New Age, and 0.7% other religions. People who answered that they had no religion were 45.2%, and 9.4% of people did not answer the census question.

Of those at least 15 years old, 84 (8.1%) people had a bachelor's or higher degree, 615 (59.2%) had a post-high school certificate or diploma, and 312 (30.1%) people exclusively held high school qualifications. The median income was $34,900, compared with $41,500 nationally. 120 people (11.6%) earned over $100,000 compared to 12.1% nationally. The employment status of those at least 15 was that 453 (43.6%) people were employed full-time, 159 (15.3%) were part-time, and 21 (2.0%) were unemployed.

== Education ==
Otamatea High School is a secondary (years 7–13) school with a roll of 573 students. The school held its 50th reunion in 2016. The District High School was established in Maungaturoto in 1939. Otamatea High School won the Goodman Fielder Composite School of the Year Award in 2000.

Maungaturoto School is a contributing primary (years 1–6) school with a roll of 195 students. It first opened in 1874.

Otamatea Christian School is a composite state-integrated (years 1–13) school with a roll of 50 students.

All these schools are coeducational. Rolls are as of July 2026.

== Railway station ==
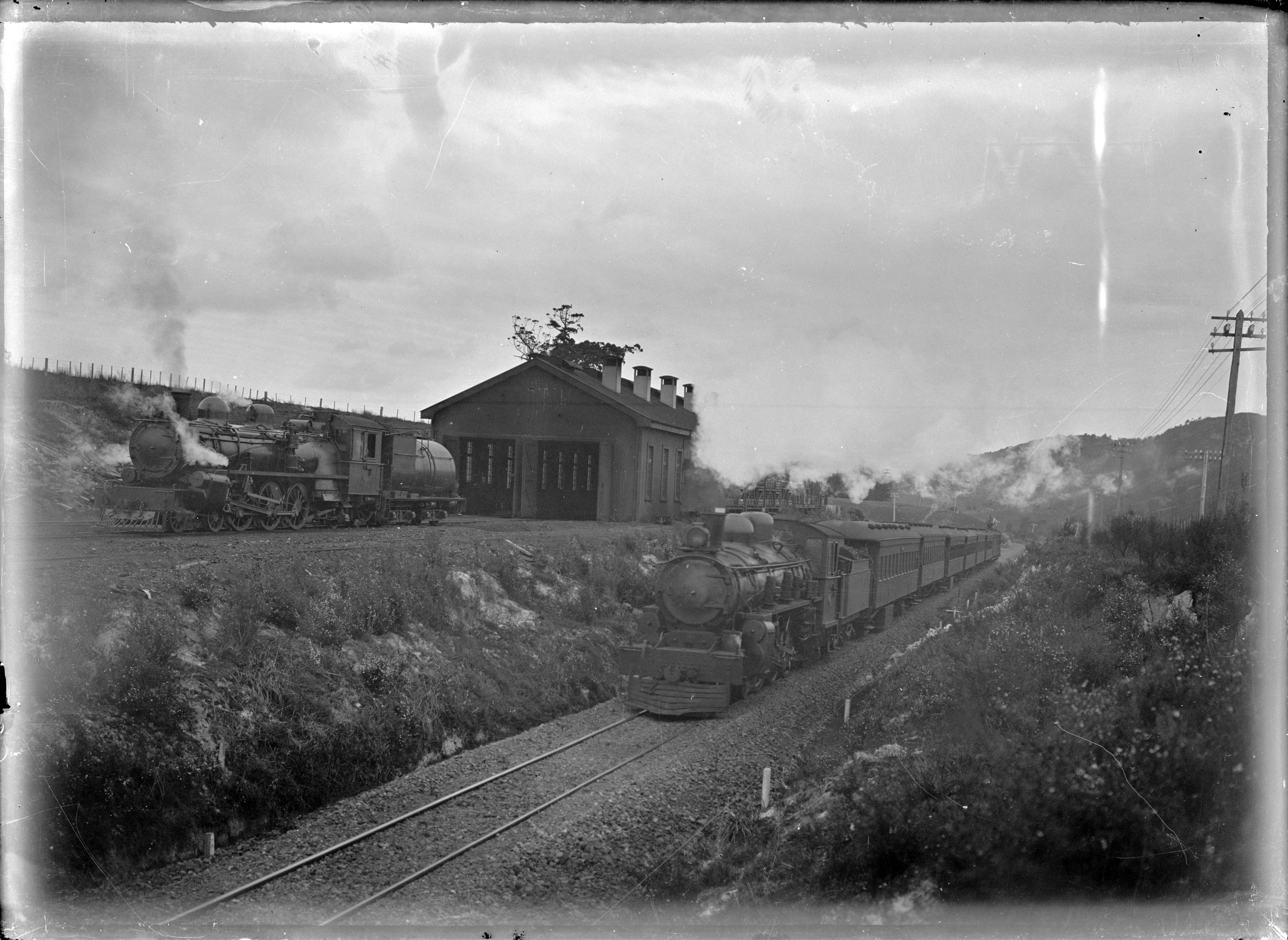
An A class steam engine hauls a southbound Northland Express through Maungaturoto in the late 1920s with an A^{B} class engine at its shed on the left.

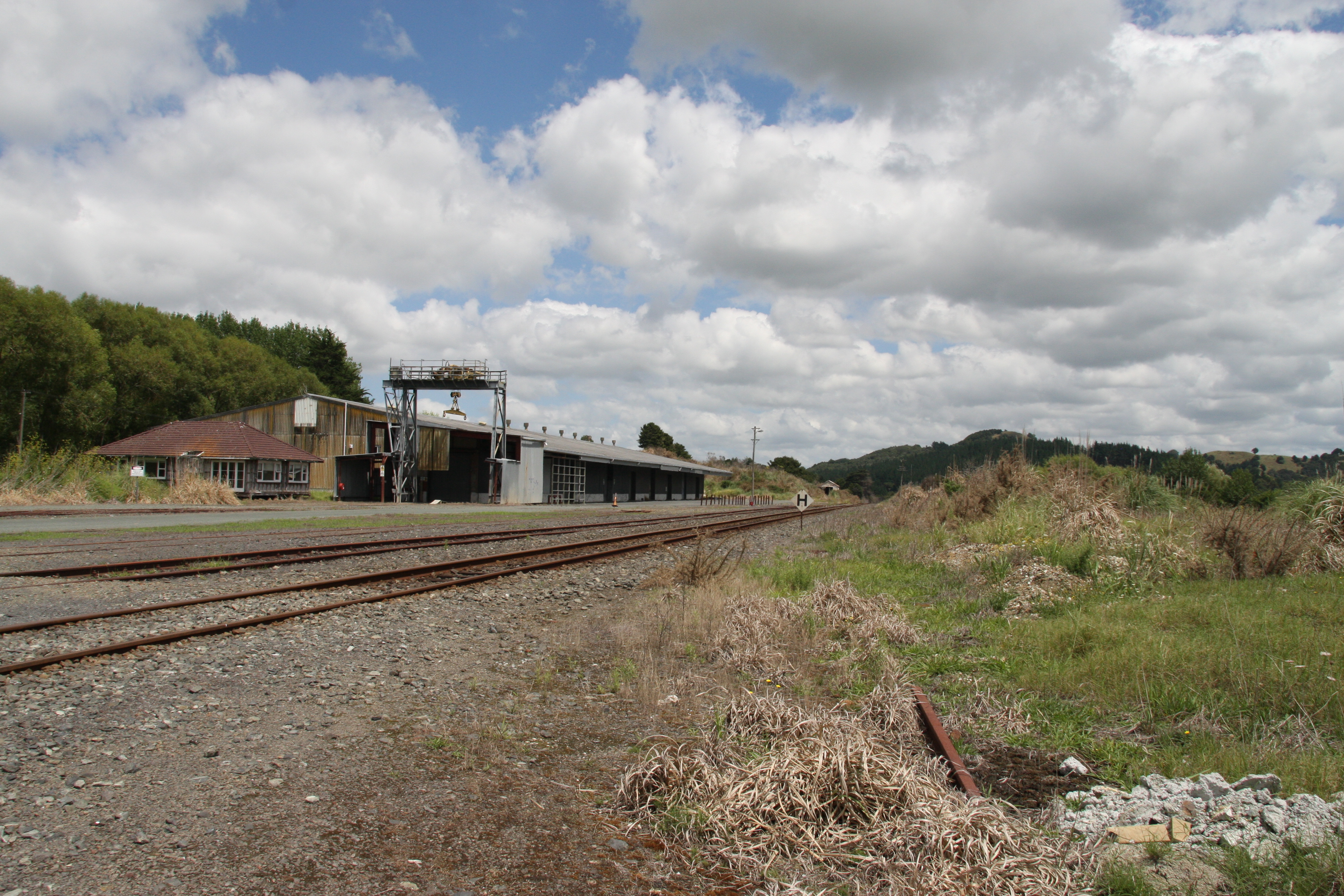
The North Auckland Line at Maungaturoto in 2011.

About 2 km (1.2 mi) south west of the town, Maungaturoto had a station on the North Auckland Line from 13 August 1915 to 12 June 1987. Passenger trains ended on 31 July 1967. Refreshment rooms opened in 1923, and had a hostel built for female refreshment room staff in 1940, but closed in November 1956. An engine shed was moved from Wellsford in 1920. Maungaturoto station also had a 30 ft (9.1 m) x 20 ft (6.1 m) goods shed, loading bank, cattle yards and a passing loop for 52 wagons. It was 89 mi 60 ch (144.4 km) from Auckland, 3.82 km (2.37 mi) south east of Huarau and 6 km (3.7 mi) north west of Bickerstaffe.

== Notable people ==
- D. J. M. Mackenzie, colonial medical official
- Grant McCallum, politician
- Hayden Tee, actor and singer
- Innes Finlayson, rugby union player
- John Finlayson, politician
