= Morningside, Whangārei =

Morningside
- Suburb
- Interactive map of Morningside
- Coordinates: 35.738107°S 174.320385°E
- Country: New Zealand
- City: Whangārei
- Local authority: Whangarei District Council
- Electoral ward: Whangārei Urban Ward

Area
  - Land: 170 ha (420 acres)

Population (June 2025)
  - Total: 2,700
  - Density: 1,600/km^{2} (4,100/sq mi)

Woodhill	Whangārei Central	Riverside
Horahora	Morningside	(Whangārei Harbour)
Raumanga	Toetoe	Port Whangārei

Morningside (Māori: Porowini) is a suburb to the south of Whangārei in Northland, New Zealand. Morningside railway housing settlement still substantially exists. Many of the houses have been considerably modified, but one 1939 house is protected by NZHPT Category II listing, number 7745.

== Demographics ==
Morningside covers 1.70 km^{2} (0.66 sq mi) and had an estimated population of 2,700 as of June 2025, with a population density of 1,588 people per km^{2}.

Historical population
Year	Pop.	±% p.a.
2006	2,127	—
2013	2,067	−0.41%
2018	2,340	+2.51%
2023	2,571	+1.90%
The 2006 population is for a smaller area of 1.20 km^{2} Source:

Morningside had a population of 2,571 in the 2023 New Zealand census, an increase of 231 people (9.9%) since the 2018 census, and an increase of 504 people (24.4%) since the 2013 census. There were 1,266 males, 1,296 females and 12 people of other genders in 912 dwellings. 3.9% of people identified as LGBTIQ+. The median age was 33.4 years (compared with 38.1 years nationally). There were 528 people (20.5%) aged under 15 years, 567 (22.1%) aged 15 to 29, 1,164 (45.3%) aged 30 to 64, and 312 (12.1%) aged 65 or older.

People could identify as more than one ethnicity. The results were 63.2% European (Pākehā); 44.2% Māori; 7.0% Pasifika; 9.3% Asian; 0.7% Middle Eastern, Latin American and African New Zealanders (MELAA); and 2.1% other, which includes people giving their ethnicity as "New Zealander". English was spoken by 96.0%, Māori language by 11.6%, Samoan by 0.4%, and other languages by 10.2%. No language could be spoken by 2.3% (e.g. too young to talk). New Zealand Sign Language was known by 0.7%. The percentage of people born overseas was 17.7, compared with 28.8% nationally.

Religious affiliations were 27.7% Christian, 1.8% Hindu, 0.2% Islam, 3.7% Māori religious beliefs, 0.9% Buddhist, 1.1% New Age, and 1.9% other religions. People who answered that they had no religion were 54.8%, and 8.3% of people did not answer the census question.

Of those at least 15 years old, 258 (12.6%) people had a bachelor's or higher degree, 1,152 (56.4%) had a post-high school certificate or diploma, and 549 (26.9%) people exclusively held high school qualifications. The median income was $38,600, compared with $41,500 nationally. 102 people (5.0%) earned over $100,000 compared to 12.1% nationally. The employment status of those at least 15 was that 1,089 (53.3%) people were employed full-time, 237 (11.6%) were part-time, and 75 (3.7%) were unemployed.

== Culture ==
Terenga Parāoa Marae and Kaka Porowini meeting house are located in Morningside. The marae is affiliated with the Ngāpuhi hapū of Uri o Te Tangata.

== Education ==
Morningside School is a coeducational contributing primary (years 1-6) school with a roll of 315 students as of July 2026.

Christian Renewal School is a composite state integrated co-educational secondary and primary (years 1–13) school with a roll of 194 students as of July 2026. Around 110 of those students are in high school (years 9–13), as of June 2018. The school was established in 1993 and integrated into the state system in 1997. The secondary half of the school is situated upstairs, and the primary downstairs. The school operates in the Christian Renewal buildings, beside the Renew Church work buildings and auditorium.
