= Northland College, Kaikohe =

Northland College

Location
- Mangakahia Road, Kaikohe, Northland, New Zealand; 35°24′50″S 173°48′33″E

Information
- Type: State co-ed secondary (Year 9–13)
- Motto: Fortis et Fidelis "Strong and Faithful"
- Established: 1947
- Ministry of Education Institution no.: 9
- Principal: Duane Allen
- Enrolment: 309 (July 2026)
- Socio-economic decile: 1
- Website: northlandcollege.school.nz

Northland College is a small co-educational secondary school in Kaikohe.

== History ==
Utilising buildings built for a military hospital during the Second World War, the school was opened in 1947. Originally called the Northland Agricultural and Technical College, the school was established with a farm and forestry block to provide financial support into the future.

Over its first twenty years new buildings were gradually added, and by 1968 the school had moved out of the original hospital buildings which remained a hostel.

== Houses ==
Like many New Zealand schools, Northland College groups students into Houses for pastoral support and internal competitions. The names of the Houses have changed over the years.

First names: Clendon, Hobson, Maning, Marsden, Pompallier, Williams.

Second names: Pouerua, Putahi, Ramaroa, Whakatere

Third names: Rata, Tawa, Rimu, Kowhai

Fourth names: Kauri, Matai, Totara.

Current names:"Manu taiko, Manu tutei, Manu taupua, Manu taki"

== New school buildings ==
In August 2015 the Ministry of Education approved a $14 million rebuild as the original school buildings had deteriorated to a considerably dilapidated state. This followed considerable reporting in NZ print and television media. The newly constructed buildings were opened in July 2017.

== Principals ==
- Duane Allen

== Notable alumni ==
- Suzy Cato – TV host and children's entertainer
- Sid Going – rugby union player
- Fiona Kidman (born 1940) – novelist, poet, scriptwriter and short story author
- Jim Peters – school principal and politician
- Joe Williams – Cook Islands politician, doctor
- Kawhena Woodman – rugby union player
- Fred Woodman – rugby union player
