= Otaika =

- Interactive map of Otaika
- Coordinates: 35°47′13″S 174°18′20″E
- Country: New Zealand
- Region: Northland Region
- District: Whangarei District
- Ward: Bream Bay Ward
- Electorates: Whangārei; Te Tai Tokerau

Government
  - Territorial Authority: Whangarei District Council
  - Regional council: Northland Regional Council
  - Mayor of Whangārei: Ken Couper
  - Whangārei MP: Shane Reti
  - Te Tai Tokerau MP: Mariameno Kapa-Kingi

Area
  - Total: 41.51 km^{2} (16.03 sq mi)

Population (June 2025)
  - Total: 1,480
  - Density: 35.7/km^{2} (92.3/sq mi)

Otaika (Māori: Ōtaika) is a suburb of Whangārei 7 km south of the city in Northland, New Zealand. The Otaika Stream runs from the north west, through the area, and into the Whangārei Harbour. State Highway 1 runs through the locality. The hill Tikorangi (with a summit 161 m above sea level) lies to the South. Tikorangi is a source of limestone for Portland Cement.

The New Zealand Ministry for Culture and Heritage gives a translation of "place of lying in a heap" for Ōtāika.

== History ==
In the 1830s, Okaika was a Māori village of Te Parawhau hapū. Tiakiriri was the chief. The first Pakeha settlers were Frederick and George Taylor, who were living at Otaika by 1856. More Pākehā settled further up the Okaika Valley around this time. George Edge's wandering geese were sometimes eaten by locals, leading to a nickname for the valley of "Kai-goose".

The local Toetoe Marae and Toetoe meeting house, located north of the village on the northern shores of the Otaika Stream, is a tribal meeting ground for the Ngāpuhi hapū of Te Parawhau and Te Uriroroi, and the Ngāti Whātua hapū of Te Uriroroi.

== Demographics ==
The statistical area of Otaika-Portland, which also includes Portland, covers 41.51 km^{2} (16.03 sq mi) and had an estimated population of 1,480 as of June 2025, with a population density of 36 people per km^{2}.

Historical population
Year	Pop.	±% p.a.
2006	1,107	—
2013	1,146	+0.50%
2018	1,338	+3.15%
2023	1,392	+0.79%

Otaika-Portland had a population of 1,392 in the 2023 New Zealand census, an increase of 54 people (4.0%) since the 2018 census, and an increase of 246 people (21.5%) since the 2013 census. There were 705 males, 681 females and 6 people of other genders in 459 dwellings. 2.8% of people identified as LGBTIQ+. The median age was 42.2 years (compared with 38.1 years nationally). There were 261 people (18.8%) aged under 15 years, 243 (17.5%) aged 15 to 29, 645 (46.3%) aged 30 to 64, and 243 (17.5%) aged 65 or older.

People could identify as more than one ethnicity. The results were 83.0% European (Pākehā); 31.7% Māori; 3.7% Pasifika; 3.0% Asian; 0.4% Middle Eastern, Latin American and African New Zealanders (MELAA); and 1.3% other, which includes people giving their ethnicity as "New Zealander". English was spoken by 97.0%, Māori language by 6.0%, Samoan by 0.2%, and other languages by 4.5%. No language could be spoken by 2.2% (e.g. too young to talk). New Zealand Sign Language was known by 0.4%. The percentage of people born overseas was 13.4, compared with 28.8% nationally.

Religious affiliations were 25.9% Christian, 0.4% Hindu, 2.6% Māori religious beliefs, 0.4% Buddhist, 0.9% New Age, and 0.9% other religions. People who answered that they had no religion were 60.3%, and 8.2% of people did not answer the census question.

Of those at least 15 years old, 120 (10.6%) people had a bachelor's or higher degree, 669 (59.2%) had a post-high school certificate or diploma, and 300 (26.5%) people exclusively held high school qualifications. The median income was $38,900, compared with $41,500 nationally. 102 people (9.0%) earned over $100,000 compared to 12.1% nationally. The employment status of those at least 15 was that 555 (49.1%) people were employed full-time, 144 (12.7%) were part-time, and 33 (2.9%) were unemployed.

== Education ==
Otaika Valley School is a coeducational contributing primary (years 1–6) school with a roll of 146 students as of March 2026.
