= Onerahi Causeway =

- Location of causeway in Northland
- Coordinates: 35°43′59″S 174°20′51″E
- Carries: Riverside Drive
- Crosses: Whangārei Harbour
- Locale: Whangārei, New Zealand
- Maintained by: Whangarei District Council

Characteristics
- Design: Causeway
- Total length: 5km

History
- Opened: 1953

Statistics
- Daily traffic: 20,000

Location
- Interactive map of Onerahi Causeway

The Onerahi Causeway is a causeway in the Northland Region of New Zealand. It links the suburb of Onerahi with the city of Whangārei and is approximately 5 km long.

The causeway is built across the marshes and seabed of the upper Whangārei Harbour. It carries approximately 20,000 vehicles a day on Riverside Drive and is one of the regions busiest roads.

== History ==
The Onerahi causeway was built between 1950 and 1953 by the Whangarei County due to a better link being needed between Whangārei and the areas of Onerahi, Parua Bay, Whangārei Heads and Whangarei Airport. The road that was existing at the time followed the northern shores of the Whangārei Harbour, with a series of small one lane bridges crossing the streams that entered the harbour, such as the Awaroa River, and Mackesy Stream. The old piles are still present today.

The construction involved draining areas of the harbour, such as the area inland of Kissing Point, and building up the road surface to avoid flooding during Spring Tides. This resulted in the new road being straight, very flat and requiring 3 bridges to be built.

The construction of the causeway also included the laying of council infrastructure, such as sewerage and water supplies to Onerahi, and the eventual closure of the waste treatment works at Onerahi. The completed works greatly improved travel to Onerahi, which was neglected when the Onerahi Branch Railway was closed in 1933.

In 2016, a cycleway was constructed along the causeway and involved some widening of the reclamation. The 6 km cycleway was built to link the Waimahanga Walkway and Hatea Loop, and reduce hazards to people walking and cycling from Onerahi to central Whangārei.

== Future ==
The causeway carrying Riverside Drive is a major arterial route, linking the growing populations of Onerahi and Whangārei Heads to Whangārei.

In 2010, Whangarei District Council announced the causeway to Onerahi would be 4-laned by 2016 as it can become congested at peak times.

As of 2025 this work has yet to be funded and has been quietly dropped from the council future projects list. These works are likely to be linked into the planned Onerahi Bypass, when it is finally constructed.

== See also ==
- Onerahi Branch, the railway closure that lead to the causeway construction
