= Whangarei Airport =

Whangārei Airport
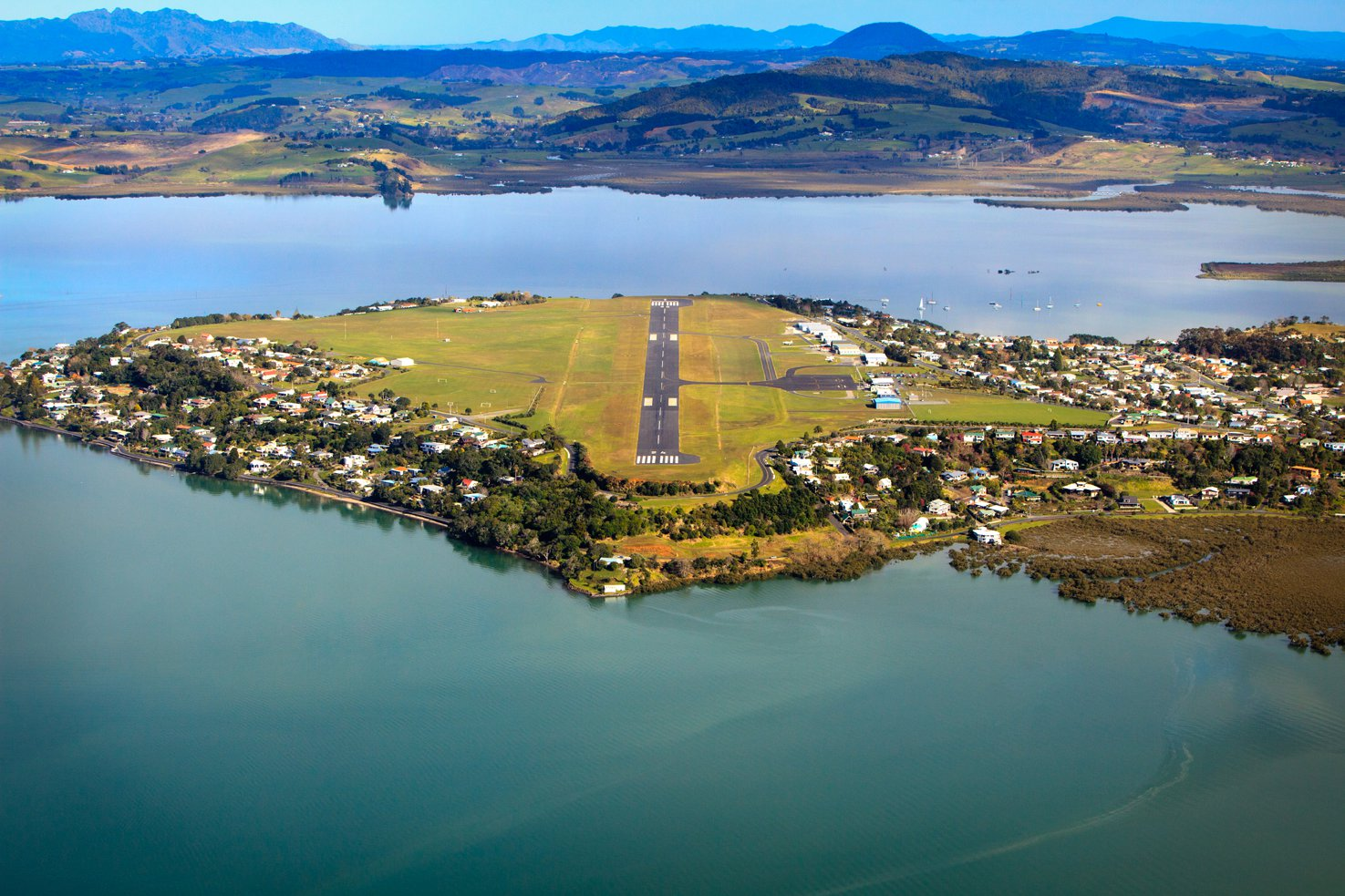
- Whangārei Airport, on the Onerahi peninsula, surrounded by Whangārei Harbour
- IATA: WRE; ICAO: NZWR

Summary
- Airport type: Public
- Operator: Whangārei District Airport
- Location: Whangārei
- Elevation AMSL: 133 ft (41 m)
- Coordinates: 35°46′06″S 174°21′54″E
- Website: www.whangareiairport.co.nz

Map
- Location of airport in Northland

Runways
Direction	Length		Surface
Direction	ft	m	Surface
06/24	3,599	1,097	Asphalt
14/32	1,558	475	Grass

Statistics (2009)
- Aircraft movements: 18,770

Whangārei Airport (IATA: WRE, ICAO: NZWR) is an airport 4 nautical miles (7.4 km; 4.6 mi) to the south east of Whangārei city, in the suburb of Onerahi, on the east coast of Northland in the North Island of New Zealand. The airport has a single terminal with two gates.

== History ==
The first aerodrome in Whangārei was located on Pohe Island in the upper reaches of Whangārei Harbour. Sir Charles Kingsford Smith's aircraft, the Southern Cross, landed on Pohe Island in 1928. This airstrip was not of high quality due to it being built on boggy reclaimed land, so a more suitable site was required. Another site was considered, at Kensington Park, but in May 1939 the current site was opened at Onerahi.

Whangārei airport, 1942

With the outbreak of World War II, immediately after the establishment of the airfield, the airport was taken over by the RNZAF to serve as a training base which became RNZAF Station Onerahi. Flight Lieutenant "Lou" Gates became one of the station commanders. Pilots practised bombing raids on the nearby Matakohe Island and Rat Island. The airport was established with three grass runways. No. 20 Squadron RNZAF was formed there in August 1942 with Hawker Hind biplanes, personnel and aircraft provided from No. 6 (AC) Squadron RNZAF at Milson, Palmerston North. The squadron was disbanded in July 1943 but reformed elsewhere later in the war. The station was reduced to two runways (06/24 and 32/14) shortly after the war and converted for public use. Some of the old airforce barracks are still present today, having been converted into residential properties.

National Airways Corporation (NAC) began twice-daily commercial flights between Whangārei and Auckland in 1948 using Lockheed Electra 10-seat aircraft. NAC replaced the Electra in March 1950 with small de Havilland Dominie 6-seat aircraft as the airport was too small to handle the new Lockheed Lodestar. The de Havilland's small size meant it serviced Whangārei with six return flights daily from Auckland. 10,148 people flew to and from Whangārei in 1950. The 06/24 runway was upgraded and sealed in December 1963 to its current length of 1097m, which allowed NAC to commence commercial flights with the much larger DC3s. A new airport terminal was built on the northern side of the main runway to cater for future growth. A new control tower was also built. The larger capacity of the DC3 meant Whangārei was serviced only twice-daily to Auckland, with some flights continuing north onwards to Kaikohe or other Northland airports.

In August 1970, NAC replaced its DC-3 service to Whangārei with larger Fokker Friendships. Northern Districts Aero Club introduced a twice-daily return air taxi service to compete and provide additional frequency to Auckland on each Monday, Wednesday and Friday. The service, which operated under the name of Executive Air Taxis, started on 21 August 1970 using a newly imported Piper Cherokee Six. This service proved to be popular and was expanded by the end of 1974 to offer a twice-daily Monday to Friday morning and afternoon return services to Auckland. Northern Districts Aero Club was able to fund new clubrooms and a hangar in 1977.

In 1988, NAC's successor Air New Zealand announced the withdrawal of its twice-daily Friendship service in favour of its newly purchased subsidiary Eagle Airways offering up to five Embraer Bandeirante flights a day through Air New Zealand Link. This led to the decline and eventual end of the Northern Districts Aero Club scheduled flights to Auckland. The control tower was closed in 1988 due to nationwide budget cuts, deregulation and as the airport was deemed too small require this service.

In 1991, a new airline, Ansett New Zealand, began flying to Whangārei in competition with Air New Zealand Link. Both airlines flew Bandeirantes, with Ansett also flying Dash 8s. The terminal was upgraded due to this growth.

In September 1998, Ansett New Zealand withdrew its service. To help meet the demand for additional seats, Eagle Airways increased its services by 14 per week to bring the number of Bandeirante flights to Whangārei to 69. This compared with Air New Zealand's previous service of 14 Friendship flights a week. The link flights acted as a more of a shuttle service between Whangarei and Auckland- high frequency on smaller sized aircraft. This proved popular as flights were operated consistently throughout the day and accommodated more passengers' needs.

In 2001, Eagle Airways purchased 16 new Beechcraft 1900D aircraft and begun using this aircraft on all routes, retiring the Bandeirante aircraft. It was able to introduce new services with the improved aircraft and in 2002 begun direct flights linking Whangārei to Wellington. This service operated twice every week day (until 2009 when it was reduced to one) and was Eagle Airways' longest regular flight service at 626 km (90 minutes).

In 2007, Sunair begun daily air services between Whangārei, Tauranga, Rotorua and Napier. This service was discontinued in 2009. Sunair returned to Whangārei in 2015 with a Whangārei to Whitianga via Claris service. This service ceased at the end of 2015 after low patronage. Sunair currently operates scheduled services from Whangarei to Great Barrier and Tauranga

In 2008, Salt Air begun an "xpress" service between Kerikeri, Whangārei and Auckland. These flights landed at North Shore and transferred passengers to Auckland CBD within 60 minutes of leaving Whangārei. This service was sold in 2012 to Flight Hauraki and ceased shortly after.

A runway upgrade in 2009 allowed Bombardier Q300 and weight restricted ATR 72 aircraft to use the airport.

In 2011, a Mount Cook Airline ATR 72 landed at Whangārei Airport becoming the first of its kind to do so. The aircraft was on charter from Gisborne.

From April 2015, Air New Zealand removed all Beech 1900D flights from the Whangārei schedule as well as ending the direct service to Wellington. Flights to and from Auckland were taken over by larger Q300 aircraft and it became the sole aircraft type flying to Whangārei for Air New Zealand.

== Airport growth and future ==
Whangārei Airport, shortly after 2009 upgrades.

In 2009, airport passenger and flight numbers were increasing steadily to reach a peak of ten return flights to Auckland and two return flights to Wellington every weekday. This resulted in the airport's capacity reaching around 140,000 passenger movements per year. However this growth stalled due to global economic downturn and improved road links to Auckland, and as such capacity and frequency subsequently reduced slightly over the following years.

A project costing $1.5 million to create a 30m takeoff starter extension and reseal the runway was completed in April 2009. The upgrade allowed larger aircraft to land and allowed Air New Zealand, through its subsidiary airline Air Nelson, to trial flights with its Bombardier Q300 aircraft. Daily flights from Auckland commenced in August 2013, growing in time to be the predominant aircraft used on the Auckland route before becoming the sole aircraft used in 2015. In August 2011, the previously weight restricted ATR 72 aircraft made its first commercial service to Whangārei Airport on charter from Gisborne.

On 30 June 2015 a terminal upgrade at the airport costing $1.02 million was announced. The aircraft taxiway was expanded to accommodate larger aircraft as well as improvements to pathways outside the terminal and the taxi stand. A second airport entry was constructed and the car park was extended with a barrier arm installed. Improvements within the terminal included more seating for passengers, upgraded toilets and an expanded internal baggage claim area. Work began in July 2015 with the last of the upgrades completed by mid-September 2016. The work enabled the terminal to be kept to an acceptable and modern standard for the foreseeable future.

In 2025, Taxiway A (Alpha) on the eastern side of the airport was sealed, alongside increased apron space. This means all 3 main taxiways are now paved.

Passenger capacity at the airport is currently at 135,000 per annum, with the airport well suited to accommodate future growth due to recent upgrades.

Whangārei District Council is investigating moving the airport as the current site is too small to expand significantly to meet requirements for larger aircraft. A runway length of between 1200m and 1350m is potentially needed to accommodate aircraft potentially in use beyond the next ten to fifteen years. A site at Mata, south of Whangārei was considered but deemed too far from central Whangārei to be viable. Another site at the former location of Port Whangārei was mooted in 2014 but further investigation of this location did not progress due to operational requirements and associated cost.

On 5 December 2020, Whangārei District Council announced it had paid $7 million for a piece of land northwest of Whangārei as a possible future site for a new airport. This land was purchased as a way of “future-proofing” council assets for relocating the airport when the time arises. In March 2021 the Whangārei District Council was investigating three possible sites, and seeking $150 million in government funding for the move.

On 22 August 2022 Whangarei District Council announced they had selected their preferred site for relocation, after public consultation, with Ruatangata being designated the most suitable. This also was the area the council had purchased land for in 2020.

As of 2025 no further progress has been made on relocating the airport, as it is now up to stakeholders to further their business case and secure funding for the relocation when the time arises.

== Airlines and destinations ==
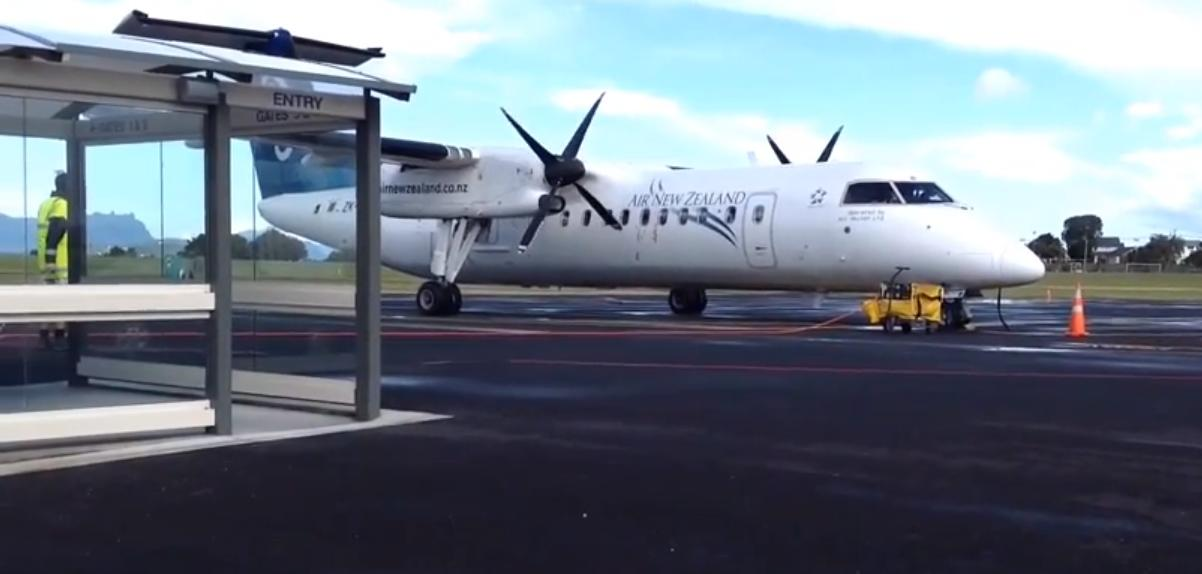
An Air New Zealand Q300 arriving at Whangārei Airport

Airlines	Destinations
Air New Zealand	Auckland
Sunair	Claris, Hamilton, Kaitaia, Tauranga

== Airport services ==
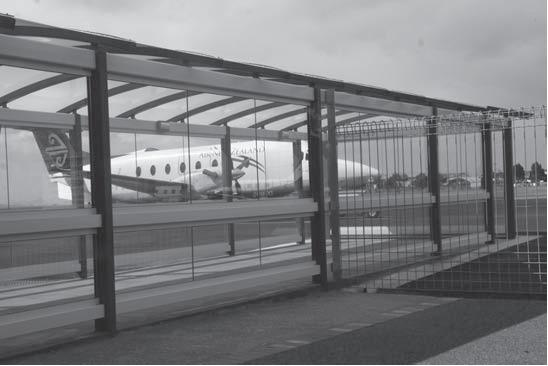
The new glass walk-through tunnel, shortly after completion, 2011

The airport has a modern air-conditioned terminal building with free wifi and a cafeteria (called Skyline Cafe), which services Air New Zealand. The terminal includes a glass walk-through tunnel to protect passengers from the weather when accessing the tarmac parking gates 1 and 2. The airport terminal has secure parking and three rental car companies, Avis, Budget, and Hertz.

Whangārei District Airport no longer has an Aero Club after a drop in membership and private flying. Flight training using micro-light aircraft is still available through the Whangārei Flying Club, which merged with the Northern District Aeroclub when it closed down. Helicopter operators Skywork and Twin Coast Helicopters both operate from the airport. One aircraft maintenance facility, Northland Aeromaintenance Ltd, is available, which conducts maintenance for aircraft across Northland. Private jets are catered for when they arrive, as well as larger group charters.

BP provide Jet A1 and AVGAS on field for aviators. Since 2006, an AWIB (Aerodrome Weather Information Broadcast) system has been broadcast on 119.8.

Rescue Fire Service (RFS) was established in 2022 as commercial air activity approached and subsequently surpassed the level where manned RFS was required. A new main fire appliance was purchased for this purpose, alongside a 4x4 support vehicle. A secondary "backup" appliance was purchased second-hand from Dunedin Airport for use when the main appliance is unavailable for service. A new Rescue Fire Service Operational Building began construction in 2025, with a budget of $2 million. The new operational building and hangar will accommodate RFS and two fire trucks, airport administration offices and LandSAR volunteer group equipment, including their vehicle and mobile command unit. This was funded by the Ministry of Transport.

== Incidents and accidents ==
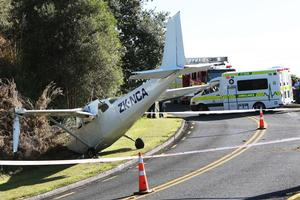
Northern Advocate photo of 2010 accident.

- 19 November 1955: A Tiger Moth owned by the Northland Districts Aero Club crashed into Whangārei Harbour and two people were injured. ZK-BEC was written off but was shortly after replaced by another Tiger Moth.
- 29 September 1957: A Waco UIC owned also by Northland Districts Aero Club crashed into Whangārei Harbour after suffering an engine failure after take-off. One of the 4 people on board was killed.
- 3 February 1965: A Victa Airtourer overshot the runway while attempting to land in drizzling rain. The aircraft ended up bouncing off the roof of a private property and destroying a greenhouse. The pilot was uninjured but the aircraft was extensively damaged.
- 22 November 2005: A PAC Fletcher top dressing plane en route to Whangārei Airport crashed 5 km west of Whangārei in the Pukenui Forest due to loss of the vertical stabiliser. Both the pilot and his passenger were killed.
- 9 February 2007: A Robinson R22 helicopter training at Whangārei Airport crash landed in Whangārei Harbour. Both people on board were uninjured. The drive belt for the rotor was believed to have failed resulting in the accident.
- 2 July 2010: A Cessna 172 leased by Skydive Ballistic Blondes crashed onto Church St at the beginning of runway 24 due to an engine failure on approach. The pilot was uninjured but the aircraft was extensively damaged.

== Photo gallery ==
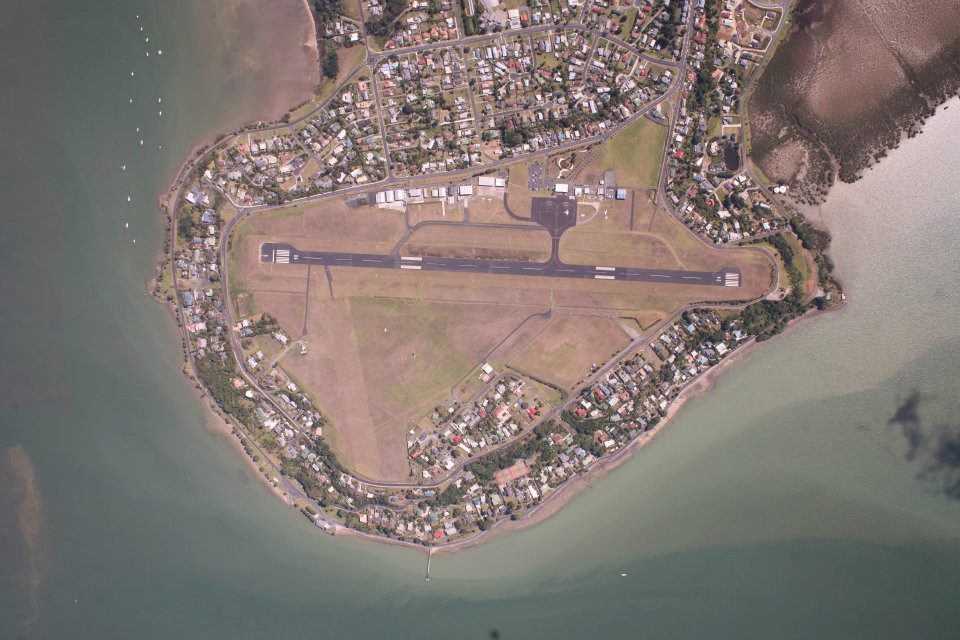
Aerial view of Whangarei Airport, after the 2009 upgrades.

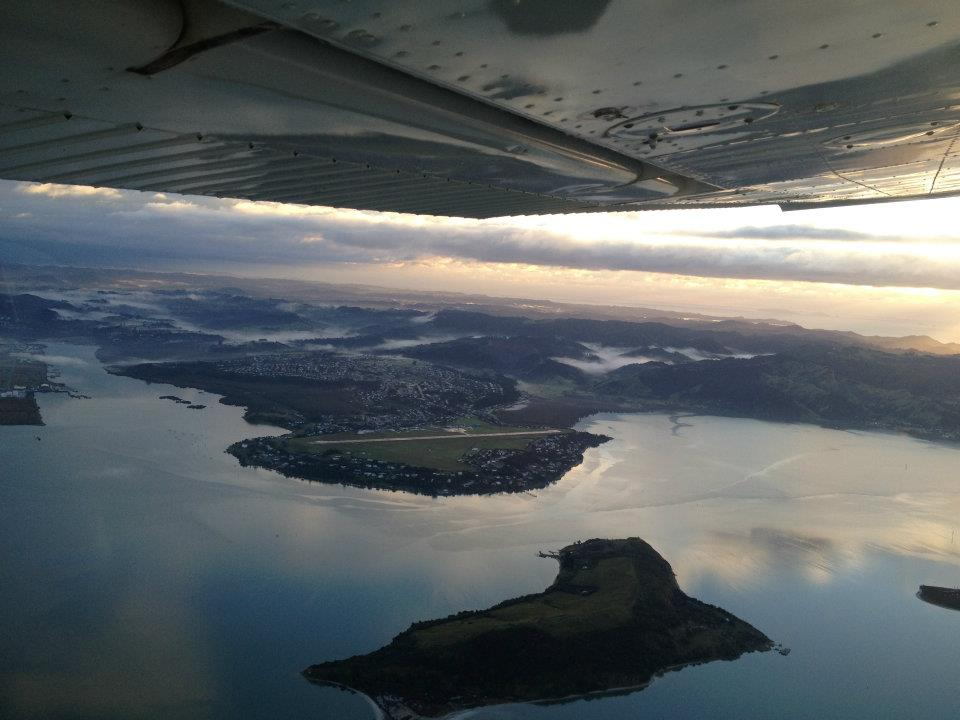
Whangarei Airport, overlooking Matakohe Island

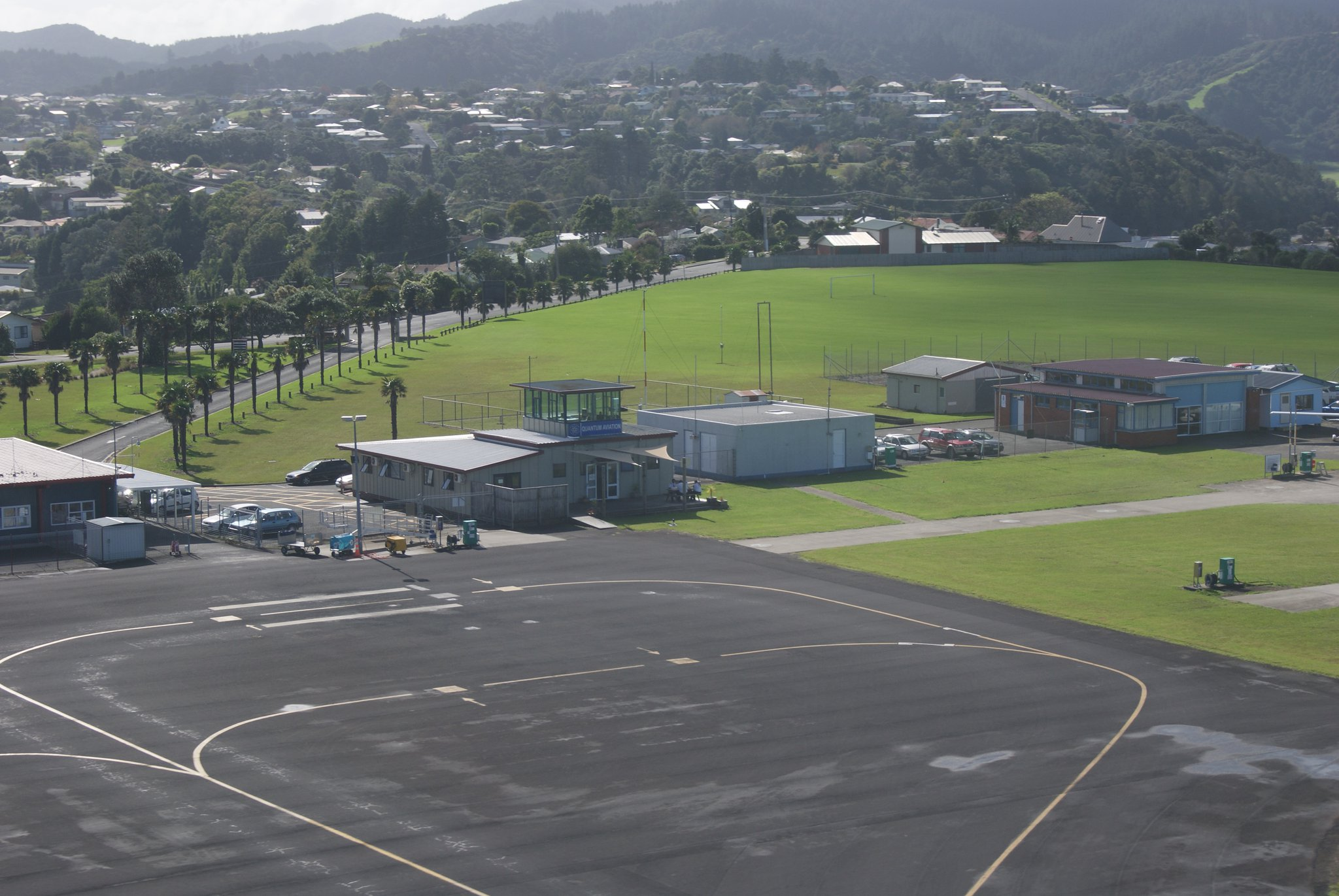
Whangarei Airport apron, with Quantum Aviation occupying the old control tower building, 2008. Visible to the right is also the old airport fire station. The Onerahi Volunteer Fire Station is visible in the background. The apron has since been resealed, with new markings and the terminal has been extended.

== See also ==
- Eagle Airways
- List of airports in New Zealand
- Onerahi
- Transport in New Zealand
