= Onerahi =

- Suburb
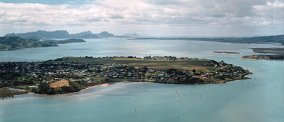
- Aerial view of Onerahi, showing Whangārei Airport
- Interactive map of Onerahi
- Coordinates: 35°46′S 174°22′E
- Country: New Zealand
- City: Whangārei
- Local authority: Whangārei District Council
- Electoral ward: Whangārei Urban Ward

Area
  - Land: 560 ha (1,400 acres)

Population (June 2025)
  - Total: 6,580
  - Density: 1,200/km^{2} (3,000/sq mi)
- Airports: Whangārei Airport

Whangārei
	Onerahi	Parua Bay
(Whangārei Harbour)	(Whangārei Harbour)	(Whangārei Harbour)

Onerahi is a harbourside suburb of Whangārei, New Zealand's northernmost city. It is the city's only seaside suburb. It is 9 km south-east of the centre of Whangārei and is mostly a peninsula jutting into Whangārei Harbour, which connects to the Pacific Ocean. The area was called Kaiwaka Point until Europeans bought it in the mid-1860s and renamed it Grahamtown. In 1912 it was renamed Onerahi.

The suburb's main feature is Whangārei Airport, located on the large flat area at the southern end of the suburb, which was built up using material from the site of a former Māori pā (fortress) just to the north. There are two concentric roads around the seaward plateau; the upper one surrounds the airport, and the lower follows the coast. The suburb is connected to Whangārei via the Onerahi Causeway.

Close to the suburb in the harbour is Motu Matakohe or Limestone Island, now being managed to restore its ecosystems. Public transport in Onerahi solely consists of bus services, the suburb is serviced by Citylink route 2 bus via Riverside Drive to Whangārei City.

== History ==
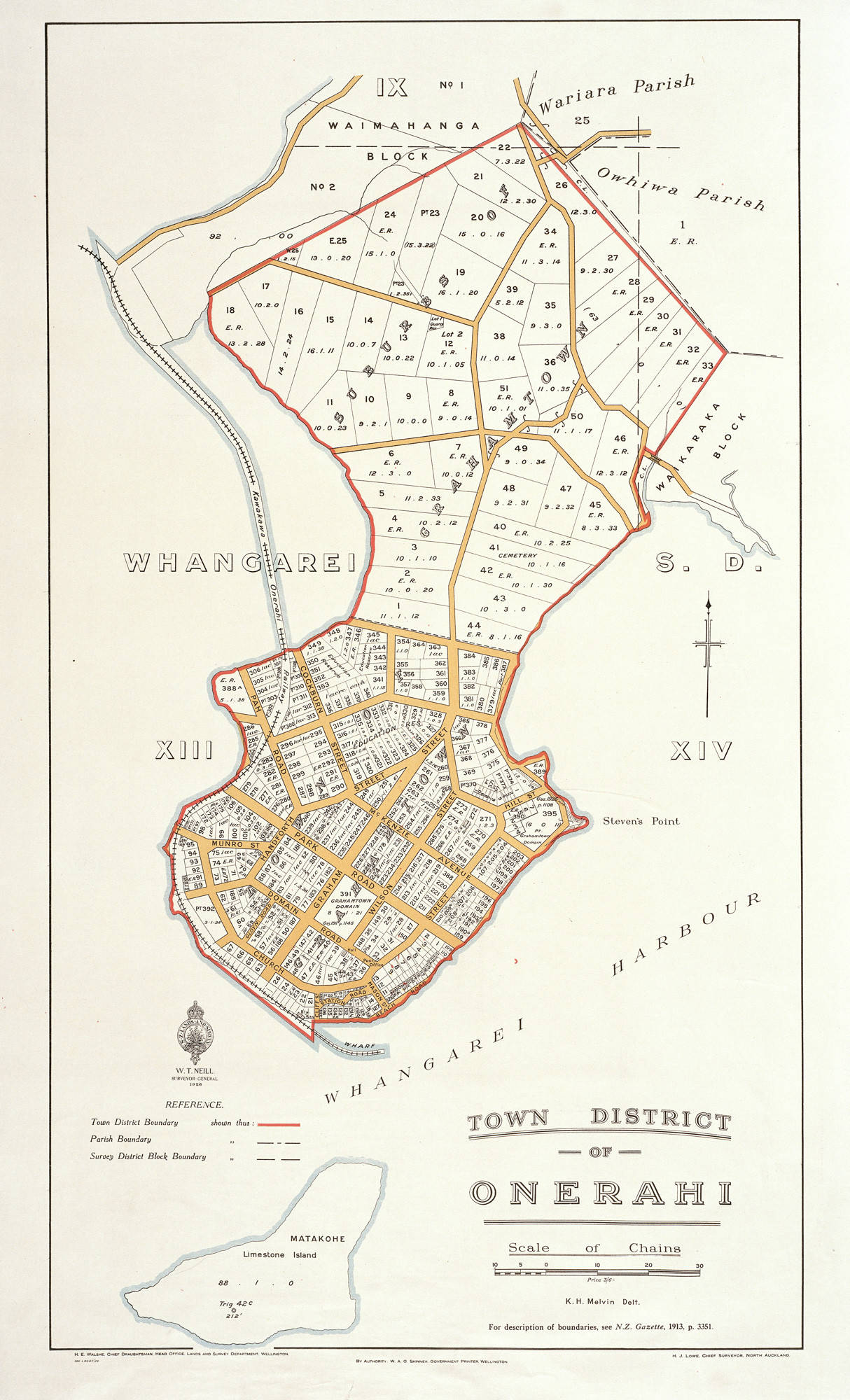
Map of Town District of Onerahi, 1926

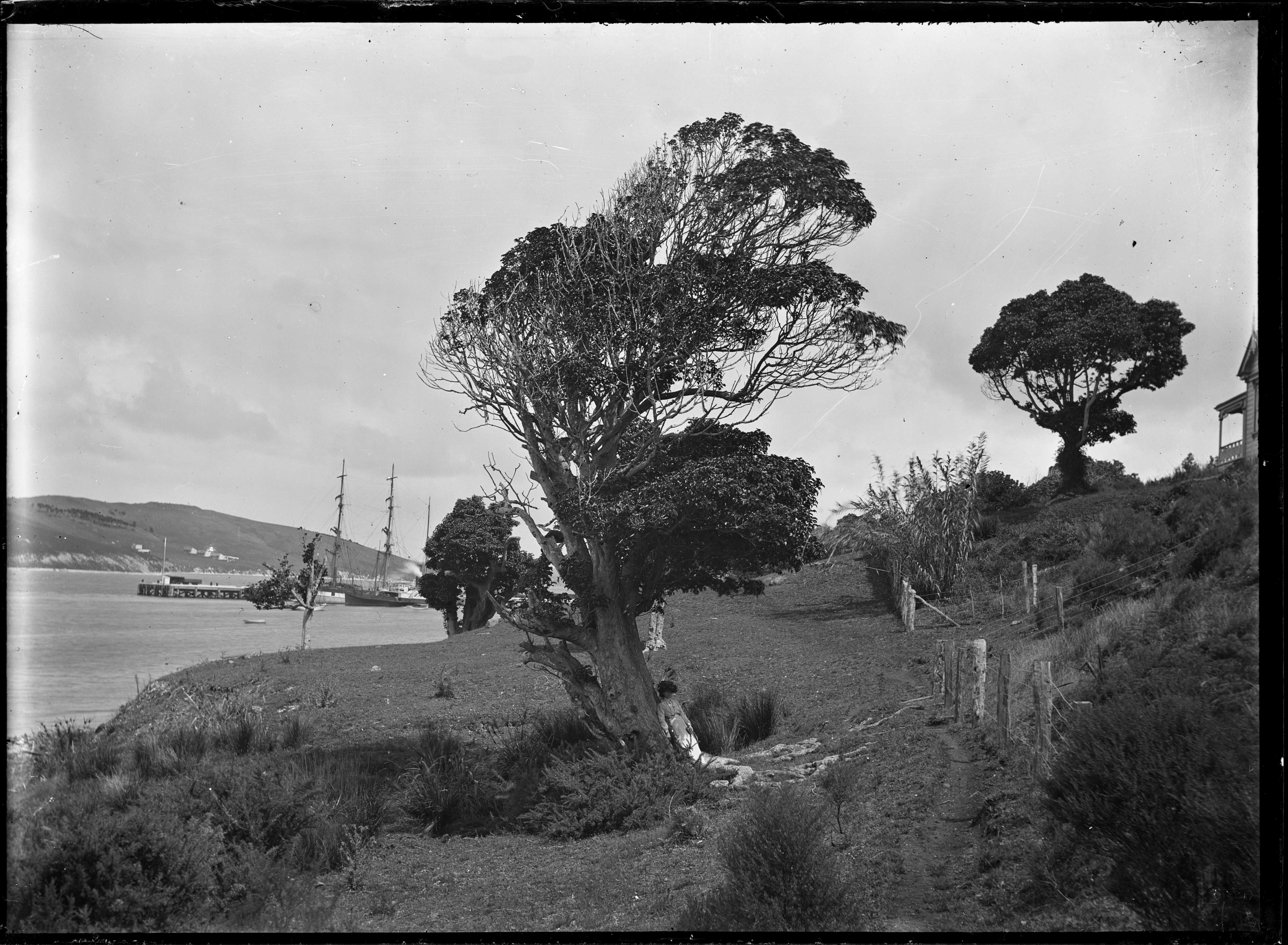
View.of Onerahi Wharf circa 1912

Onerahi can mean "long beach", from one ('beach') and rahi ('long' or 'wide'). According to a Māori legend, the place was also called Onerahirahi. Twin sisters Reitū and Reipae were being carried on the back of a kārearea (falcon) to Ueoneone, a Te Rarawa chief they were in love with. Reitū, who was seated to the front, suggested to the falcon that it might be getting tired carrying the both of them. Reipae overheard the remark, took offence and asked the falcon to land, which it did at Onerahi. After dismounting, Reipae was unable to remount the falcon and remained there, naming the place Onerahirahi, meaning the beach (one) of quick overhearing (rahirahi).

The land for the town was purchased by Henry Walton and William Smellie Graham from Te Tirarau in the mid-1860s. It had been called Kaiwaka Point, but they renamed it Grahamtown. In 1912 it was renamed Onerahi to prevent a conflict with Grahamstown in the Coromandel.

From 1911 to 1933, Onerahi was served by a branch line railway from the North Auckland Line known as the Onerahi Branch. It was built to provide access to a wharf in Onerahi. When coastal shipping declined severely in the 1930s, the railway was closed. Part of its formation has been retained as a walking track.

Whangarei Aerodrome, now Whangarei Airport, opened at Onerahi in May 1939 and was soon taken over as an RNZAF training base. It later returned to civilian use, with commercial flights commencing in 1947, and has served Whangārei since.

== Demographics ==
Onerahi covers 5.60 km^{2} (2.16 sq mi) and had an estimated population of 6,580 as of June 2025, with a population density of 1,175 people per km^{2}.

Historical population
Year	Pop.	±% p.a.
2006	5,742	—
2013	5,790	+0.12%
2018	6,501	+2.34%
2023	6,411	−0.28%

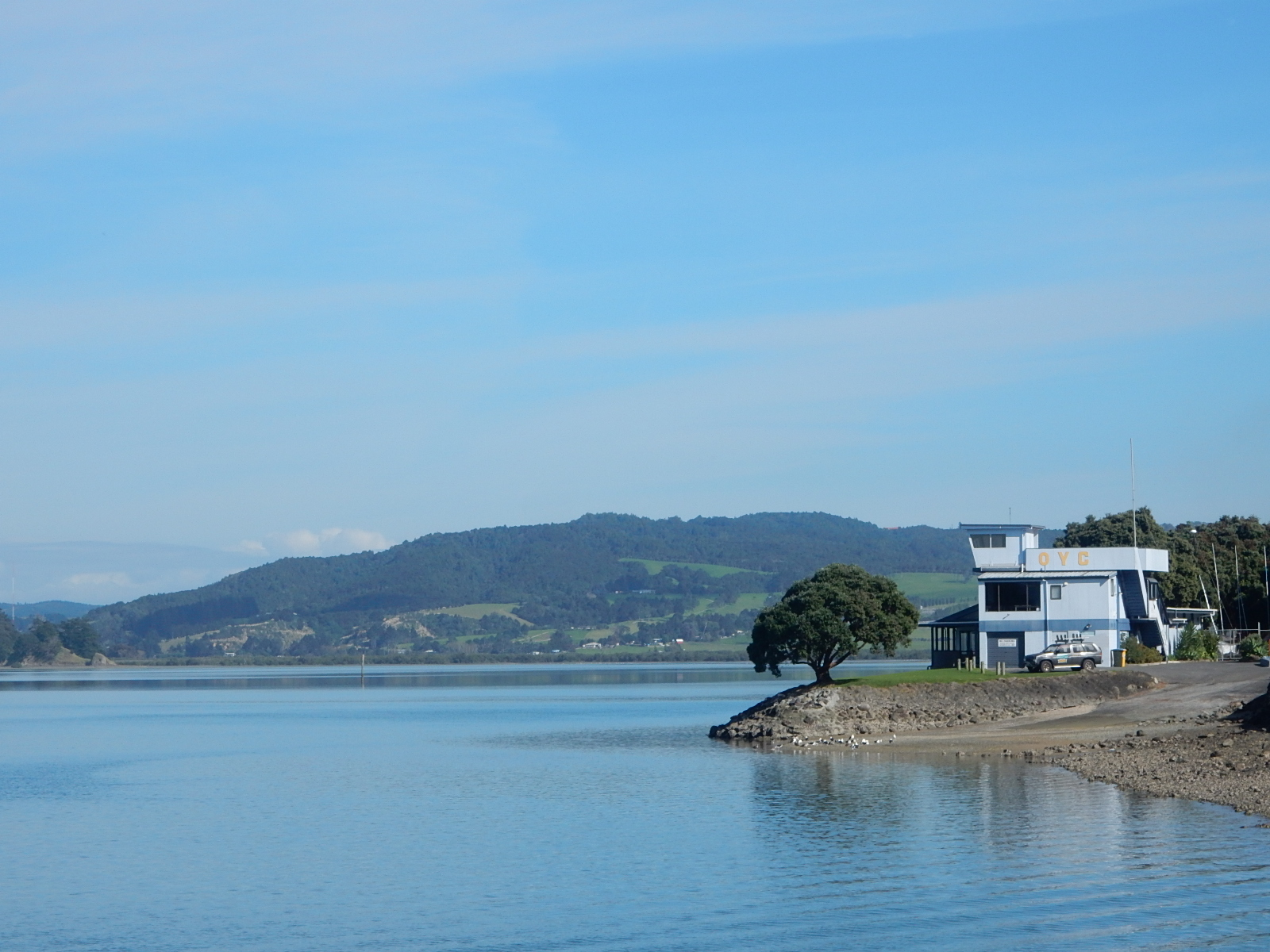
Onerahi Yacht Club

Onerahi had a population of 6,411 in the 2023 New Zealand census, a decrease of 90 people (−1.4%) since the 2018 census, and an increase of 621 people (10.7%) since the 2013 census. There were 3,048 males, 3,342 females and 15 people of other genders in 2,454 dwellings. 3.0% of people identified as LGBTIQ+. The median age was 40.9 years (compared with 38.1 years nationally). There were 1,275 people (19.9%) aged under 15 years, 1,068 (16.7%) aged 15 to 29, 2,664 (41.6%) aged 30 to 64, and 1,404 (21.9%) aged 65 or older.

People could identify as more than one ethnicity. The results were 73.8% European (Pākehā); 33.6% Māori; 5.0% Pasifika; 5.3% Asian; 0.8% Middle Eastern, Latin American and African New Zealanders (MELAA); and 2.9% other, which includes people giving their ethnicity as "New Zealander". English was spoken by 96.8%, Māori language by 7.3%, Samoan by 0.3%, and other languages by 9.5%. No language could be spoken by 2.3% (e.g. too young to talk). New Zealand Sign Language was known by 0.6%. The percentage of people born overseas was 19.7, compared with 28.8% nationally.

Religious affiliations were 30.7% Christian, 1.3% Hindu, 0.3% Islam, 3.0% Māori religious beliefs, 0.7% Buddhist, 0.6% New Age, 0.1% Jewish, and 1.0% other religions. People who answered that they had no religion were 54.6%, and 7.8% of people did not answer the census question.

Of those at least 15 years old, 726 (14.1%) people had a bachelor's or higher degree, 2,883 (56.1%) had a post-high school certificate or diploma, and 1,296 (25.2%) people exclusively held high school qualifications. The median income was $35,600, compared with $41,500 nationally. 315 people (6.1%) earned over $100,000 compared to 12.1% nationally. The employment status of those at least 15 was that 2,325 (45.3%) people were employed full-time, 651 (12.7%) were part-time, and 147 (2.9%) were unemployed.

Individual statistical areas
Name	Area (km^{2})	Population	Density (per km^{2})	Dwellings	Median age	Median income
Onerahi Park	2.00	1,611	806	648	44.1 years	$35,100
Sherwood Rise	1.31	2,424	1,850	915	37.2 years	$37,200
Onerahi	2.29	2,376	1,038	891	42.6 years	$34,000
New Zealand					38.1 years	$41,500

== Education ==
Onerahi Primary School, established in 1893, is a contributing primary (years 1–6) school with a roll of 403 as of July 2026. Raurimu Avenue School is a full primary (years 1–8) school with a roll of 42 as of July 2026. Both schools are coeducational.

== Sport ==
The Onerahi Central Cricket Club celebrated their 50th anniversary in 2006, highlighted by a re-run of their first game against Whangārei Boys' High School with best-of selections.
