= Kerikeri Airport =

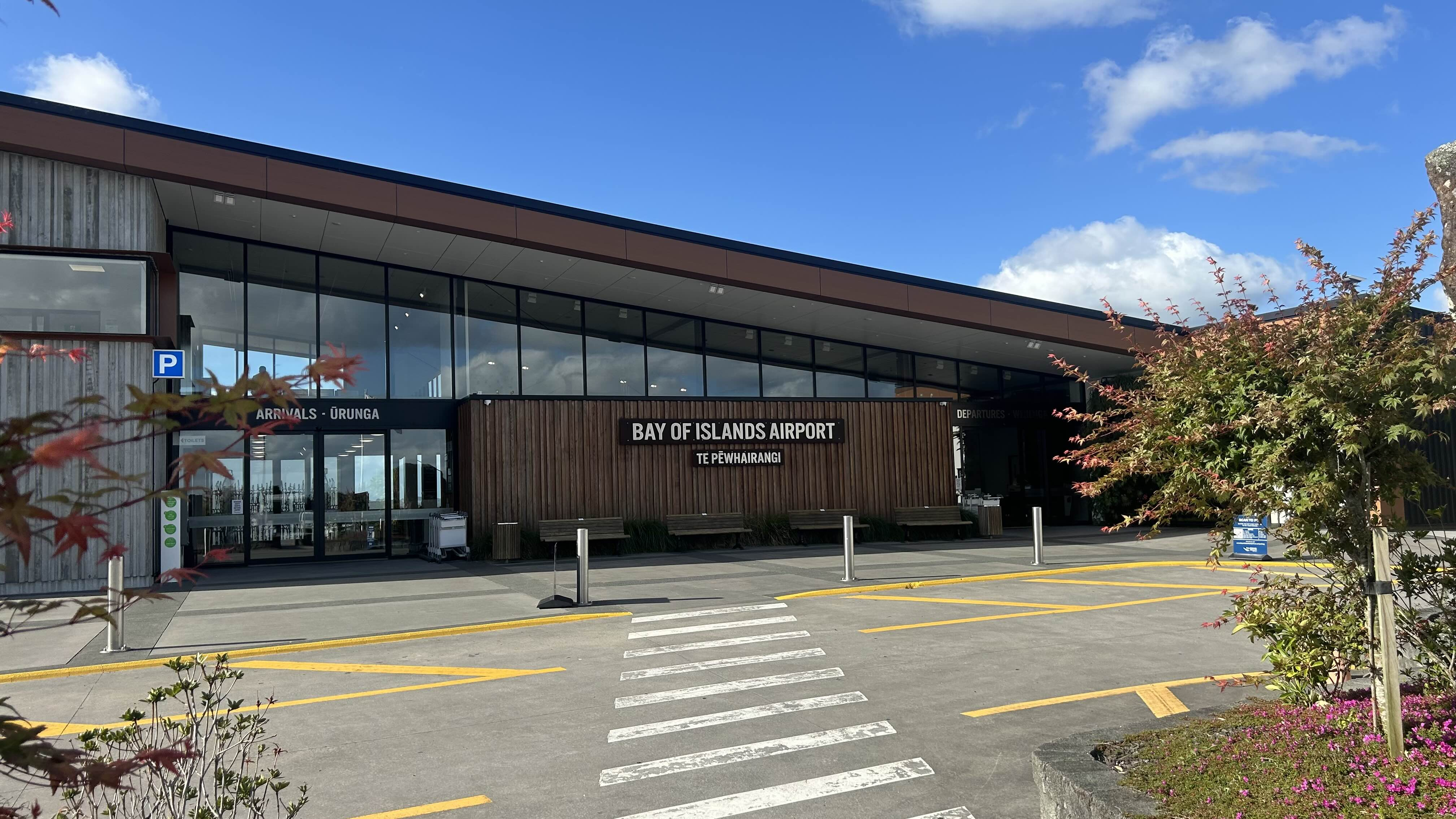
- IATA: KKE; ICAO: NZKK

Summary
- Owner/Operator: Far North Holdings
- Location: Kerikeri
- Elevation AMSL: 492 ft (150 m)
- Coordinates: 35°15′46″S 173°54′43″E
- Website: www.kerikeri-airport.co.nz

Map
- Location of airport in Northland

Runways
Direction	Length		Surface
Direction	ft	m	Surface
02/20	1,608	490	Grass
15R/33L	3,904	1,190	Asphalt
15L/33R	2,247	685	Grass
- Source: World Aero Data

Kerikeri Airport (IATA: KKE, ICAO: NZKK), also known as Bay of Islands Airport, is an airport near Kerikeri, New Zealand. It is a ten-minute drive from Kerikeri and a 50-minute flight to or from Auckland Airport.

== History ==
The airport was initially a grass airstrip created in the early 1930s or possibly earlier. During World War II the airport was taken over by the Defence Department for Royal New Zealand Air Force training. After the war ended it was once again run by local government.

In 1972, Mount Cook Airlines decided to use the airport to connect to tourist resorts. The service failed through lack of patronage. A Kerikeri-Auckland route was started by the airline but was not widely used. It was not until 1992, after the transfer of the airport to Northern Airports Corporation (now merged into Far North Holdings Ltd), that Eagle Airways (a subsidiary of Air New Zealand) took over scheduled service and patronage on the route increased. Eagle Airways ceased its Kerikeri service in 2015. Air New Zealand Link subsidiary, Air Nelson, (who had been operating to Kerikeri on occasion) took over the Auckland to Kerikeri route using a 50-seat Bombardier Dash 8 Q300. During the Auckland lockdown in August 2021 due to the COVID-19 pandemic, Air New Zealand operated a direct service from Kerikeri to Wellington between September and December 2021. This service has not operated since. In 2024, Air New Zealand began operating the ATR 72-600 to Auckland, complementing the Dash 8.

In 2008, Salt Air began twice daily flights to North Shore Aerodrome in Auckland with a Cessna Caravan, utilising the Northern Busway to transport passengers to the city centre traffic free. That same year the airline began tours to a private airfield near Cape Reinga from Kerikeri with a Gippsland GA8 Airvan. The North Shore service was sold to Flight Hauraki (now Air Auckland) in 2012, before being dropped in February 2013 by the airline, less than three months after it was taken over.

Salt Air operates Cape Reinga tours and uses Kerikeri for fixed wing operations with its sole Gippsland GA8.

The runway was extended in 2014–15 and the apron area was strengthened and expanded to allow more aircraft to park. This was paid for by Air New Zealand. In October 2016 it was announced the terminal would be expanded due to an increase in passenger numbers with a record 87,000 in 2015, an increase of 33 percent since Dash 8 began servicing the Auckland-Kerikeri route.

The government announced on 16 March 2018 that the airport required a new terminal to meet demand; it was one of the fastest-growing regional airports in the country handling a record 110,000 passengers in the 2017/2018 financial year. The existing terminal was not fit for purpose and did not meet Air New Zealand's requirements, while growth in passenger numbers also put pressure on the existing facilities. The new $4.75 million terminal opened on 16 June 2019 with improved arrivals and departures, baggage screening and luggage collection facilities. $1.75 million of the funding came from the government's annual $1 billion provincial growth fund, announced by the Regional economic development minister Shane Jones.

In 2024 Barrier Air decided to serve Kerikeri from Auckland to introduce competition on the Kerikeri to Auckland Route.

== Light aircraft transit ==
Kerikeri Airport is used by light aircraft arriving or departing from New Zealand. Norfolk Island Airport is 890 km (481 nautical miles) north-west of Kerikeri, 1613 km (870 nautical miles) to Nouméa in New Caledonia, or 1439 km (777 nautical miles) to Lord Howe Island which can be used as a stepping stone to the Australian mainland.

These distances are within the range of many light aircraft when fitted with long range tanks, while the direct distance without using Norfolk Island as a stepping stone is usually beyond their capabilities. From New Caledonia other Pacific Islands such as Vanuatu and Fiji are within range and can be used as further 'stepping stones' to the other South Pacific and North Pacific destinations through the 'island hopping' technique. Kaitaia Airport also has fuel available and is 52 km (28 nautical miles) closer to Norfolk Island than Kerikeri.

== Airlines and destinations ==
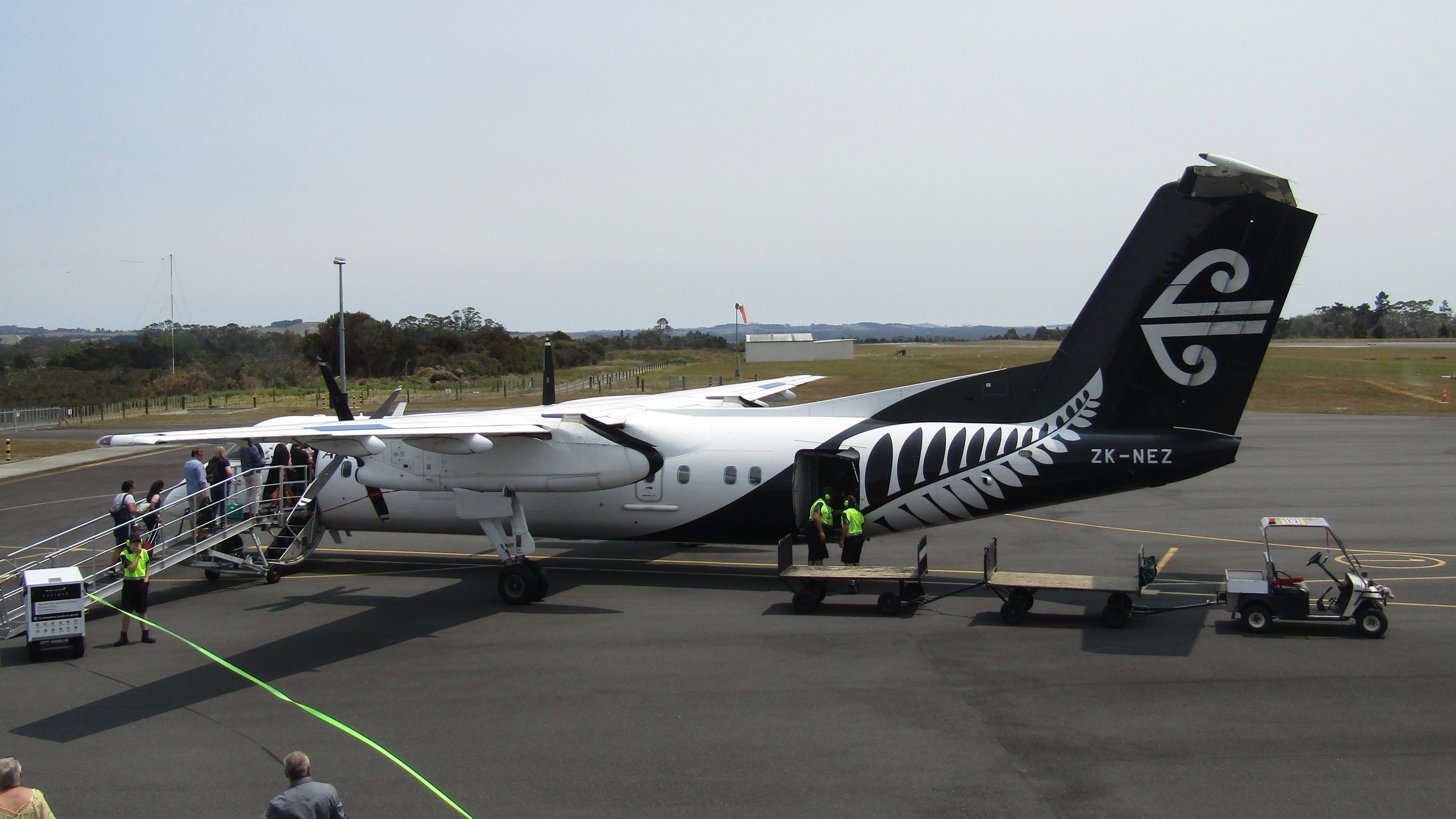
An Air New Zealand Dash 8 at Kerikeri Airport in January 2020.

Airlines	Destinations
Air New Zealand	Auckland
Barrier Air	Auckland

Alongside scheduled operators, Kerikeri Airport is also home to the Coastguard and the Bay of Islands Aero Club, both situated alongside the south-eastern grass runway.

== See also ==
- List of airports in New Zealand
- List of airlines of New Zealand
- Transport in New Zealand
