= Mangapai River =

Coordinates: 35.819°S 174.349°E

Location
- Country: New Zealand

Physical characteristics
- Mouth
  - location: Whangārei Harbour
- Length: 10 km (6.2 mi)

The Mangapai River is a river of the Northland Region of New Zealand's North Island. It is perhaps better described as a silty arm of Whangārei Harbour, located 10 kilometres (6 mi) due south of Whangārei. Its average width is some 4 metres (13 ft), but the silty nature of its course means that the stream itself is far narrower.

The New Zealand Ministry for Culture and Heritage gives a translation of "good stream" for Mangapai.

== See also ==
- List of rivers of New Zealand
