= Henry Walton (politician) =

Henry Walton JP (1817–1896) was a New Zealand farmer and politician.

== Biography ==
Walton was born in England, the son of a crape manufacturer. Together with his brother Charles, he came to New Zealand in 1840 and settled at Maungatapere near Whangārei. Henry and Charles Walton came with workers and together with Thomas Elmsley, they established farms in the area. Henry Walton's farm was on the slopes of Maungatapere hill and was called 'Maungatapere Park'. After the Flagstaff War, Walton employed former soldiers to build stone walls that are still a feature of the area. Henry Walton married Kohura, Te Tirarau Kukupa's niece, in 1846. After she died in childbirth, he married her sister, Pehi, but she died in a measles epidemic in 1856.

Walton built a road between Maungatapere and Whangarei in 1858. He also became involved in coal mining and shipbuilding, and was one of the partners in the timber mill at Te Kōpuru. Walton was one of the founding shareholders in the Bank of New Zealand. The brothers supplied most of the building timber to the Kaipara Timber Mills, and they started the lime kiln that is situated on Limestone Island {Motu Matakohe} in Whangārei Harbour.

On 17 October 1863, he was appointed to the New Zealand Legislative Council, where he served until his resignation on 8 May 1866. On 14 November 1865, he was elected to the Auckland Provincial Council for the Marsden electorate; he resigned on 28 October 1867. He left New Zealand in 1867 and returned to England to take over his father's business. Maungatapere Park was eventually sold for subdivision into farms.

He died in England in 1896.
