= Waitiki Landing =

- Interactive map of Waitiki Landing
- Coordinates: 34.5189°S 172.8396°E
- Country: New Zealand
- Region: Northland Region
- District: Far North District
- Ward: Te Hiku
- Community: Te Hiku
- Subdivision: North Cape
- Electorates: Northland; Te Tai Tokerau

Government
  - Territorial Authority: Far North District Council
  - Regional council: Northland Regional Council
  - Mayor of Far North: Moko Tepania
  - Northland MP: Grant McCallum
  - Te Tai Tokerau MP: TBD

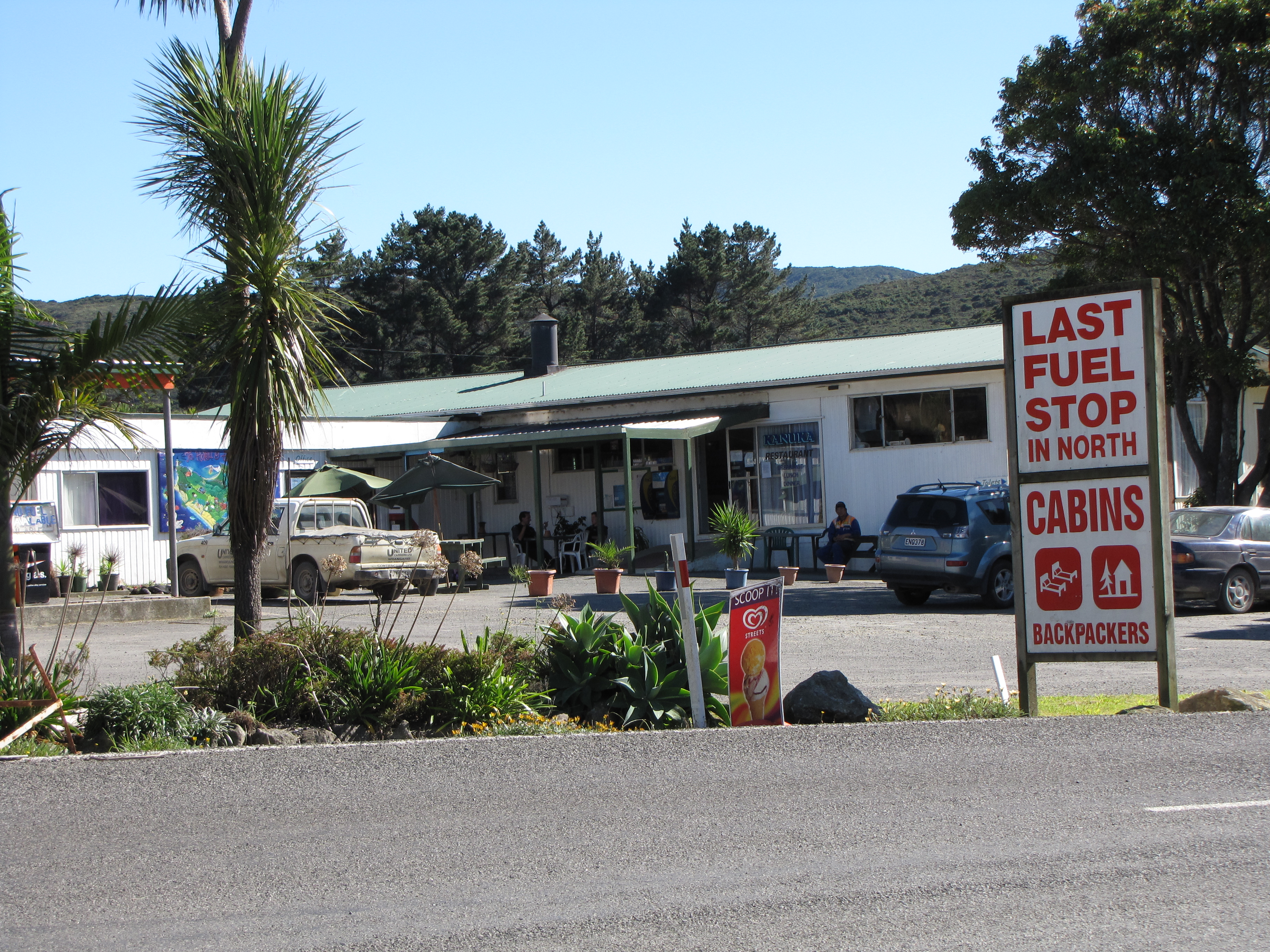
Shopping complex at Waitiki Landing, 2009

Waitiki Landing is a locality near the northern tip of New Zealand's North Island, in the Far North district of Northland. Located on State Highway 1, it is 20 kilometres from the end of the highway at Cape Reinga.

It has a general store, petrol/diesel refueling station, cafe, commercial holiday park, electric vehicle charging station and airstrip, all of which are the northernmost in New Zealand. The airstrip is used by Salt Air for excursions from the Bay of Islands to Cape Reinga. The petrol station and general store burnt down on 8 October 2011 and were rebuilt and reopened on 22 December 2011.

A side-road runs eastward from Waitiki Landing to Te Hāpua, the northernmost settlement in New Zealand. Five kilometres north-west on the highway, another side-road leads south-west to Te Paki Sand Dunes, beside Ninety Mile Beach.

== Demographics ==
Waitaki Landing is in an SA1 statistical area which covers 218.02 km^{2} (84.18 sq mi) and includes the area west of Parengarenga Harbour between Waitaki Landing and Tangoake. The SA1 area is part of the larger North Cape statistical area.

Historical population
Year	Pop.	±% p.a.
2013	168	—
2018	183	+1.73%
2023	177	−0.66%

The SA1 statistical area had a population of 177 in the 2023 New Zealand census, a decrease of 6 people (−3.3%) since the 2018 census, and an increase of 9 people (5.4%) since the 2013 census. There were 93 males, and 84 females in 63 dwellings. 1.7% of people identified as LGBTIQ+. The median age was 38.4 years (compared with 38.1 years nationally). There were 39 people (22.0%) aged under 15 years, 30 (16.9%) aged 15 to 29, 78 (44.1%) aged 30 to 64, and 30 (16.9%) aged 65 or older.

People could identify as more than one ethnicity. The results were 27.1% European (Pākehā), 83.1% Māori, 13.6% Pasifika, and 1.7% Asian. English was spoken by 96.6%, Māori language by 44.1%, and other languages by 3.4%. No language could be spoken by 1.7% (e.g. too young to talk). The percentage of people born overseas was 11.9, compared with 28.8% nationally.

Religious affiliations were 42.4% Christian, 30.5% Māori religious beliefs, and 1.7% Jewish. People who answered that they had no religion were 20.3%, and 5.1% of people did not answer the census question.

Of those at least 15 years old, 9 (6.5%) people had a bachelor's or higher degree, 84 (60.9%) had a post-high school certificate or diploma, and 45 (32.6%) people exclusively held high school qualifications. The median income was $27,900, compared with $41,500 nationally. 6 people (4.3%) earned over $100,000 compared to 12.1% nationally. The employment status of those at least 15 was that 60 (43.5%) people were employed full-time, 18 (13.0%) were part-time, and 6 (4.3%) were unemployed.
