= Motu Matakohe =

Island in New Zealand

Matakohe (Māori) Nickname: Limestone Island
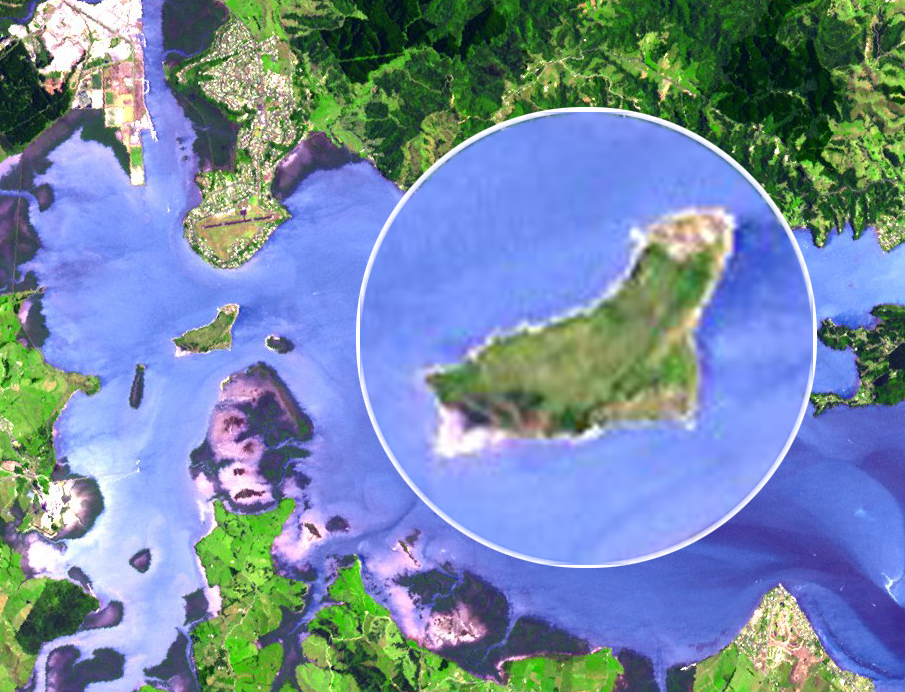
- The island from above
- Interactive map of Motu Matakohe

Geography
- Location: Whangārei Harbour, Pacific Ocean
- Coordinates: 35°47′3″S 174°21′34″E
- Area: 0.37 km^{2} (0.14 sq mi)

Administration
- New Zealand
- Northland: New Zealand

Demographics
- Population: 1 (island ranger)
- Pop. density: 0/km^{2} (0/sq mi)

Motu Matakohe, also known as Matakohe or Limestone Island, is a 37 hectares (91 acres) island in the upper reaches of Whangārei Harbour, just off Onerahi, a seaside suburb of the city of Whangārei, Northland, New Zealand. Used for farming and industry for many years, the island is an example of ecological island restoration by a volunteer community group.

== History ==
The earliest known inhabitants of the island were Ngaitahuhu Māori who occupied it in the early 18th century. They were dispossessed and driven out of the Whangārei area in the mid 18th century by Ngāpuhi Māori led by Te Ponaharakeke.

The first European house on the island was built in 1832, though later destroyed. In 1848 the island was leased from the Parawhau hapū by Robert Carruth and Mathew Whitelaw who established a limeworks there, using the local limestone. In 1865 the island was purchased by Henry Walton from Te Tirarau and the Parawahau chiefs. The limeworks were extended and sheep were farmed. In 1881 the first batch of Portland cement was produced, with the limeworks becoming a major local industry employing 270 people at its peak in the early 20th century. The island was later purchased by the Northland Harbour Board and used as pasture for several decades. In 1989 it was given to the Whangarei District, following which the first conservation and rehabilitation work began.

== Ecological restoration ==
The island is managed by the Friends of Matakohe-Limestone Island Society (FOMLI), which was incorporated in 1991. In 1996 David Wright was employed as the Resident Ranger to look after and maintain the island. In 1999 it was gazetted as a scenic reserve, with a floating dock constructed for public access. Restoration work has involved massive plantings of native plants as well as the reintroduction and translocation of animals previously lost to the island and the surrounding region.

=== Invertebrates ===
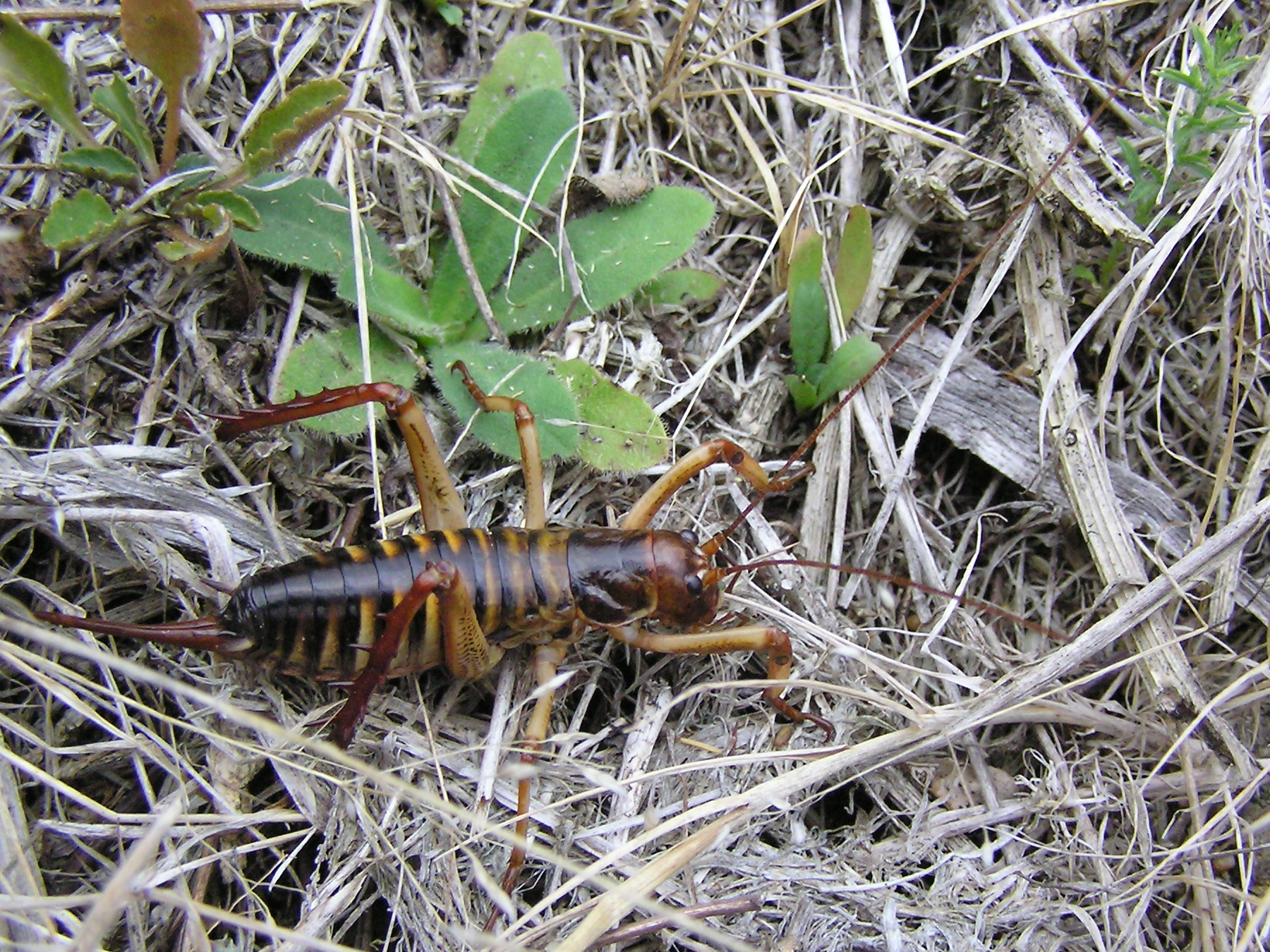
Tree wētā

Invertebrates introduced from the mainland include wētā, stick insects, and flax snails, the latter unsuccessfully so far. Adult wētā have been found on the island well away from their release sites.

=== Reptiles ===
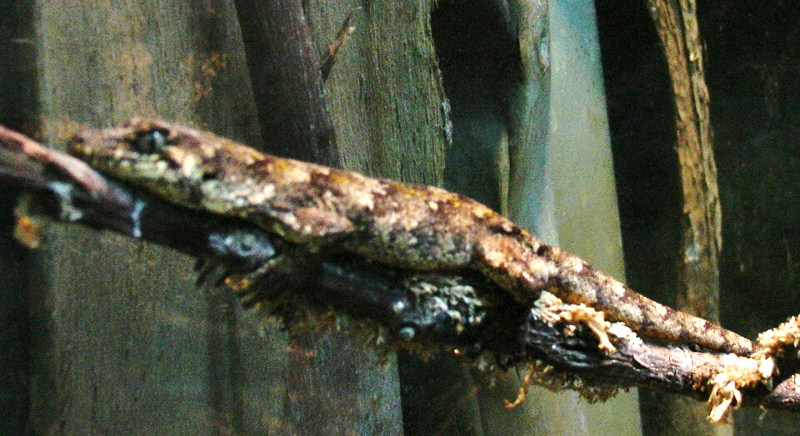
Forest gecko

Various lizard species have either been reintroduced to the island, or are planned to be, some of which have shrinking distributions on the mainland. A pair of juvenile forest geckos were released in 2001, but have not been seen since. Shore skinks and ornate skinks have been introduced. The island is also suitable for tuatara.

=== Kiwi ===
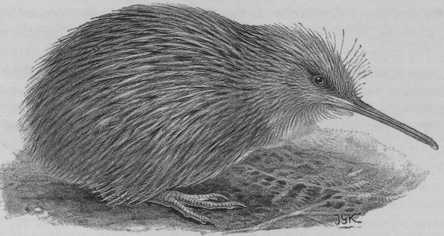
Kiwi chick

From 2001, North Island brown kiwi have been introduced to the island. As part of the Department of Conservation's Operation Nest Egg Program numerous chicks have been released on the island because of its largely predator-free status. It has proved a safe place for them to grow to 1 kilogram (2.2 lb) or more in weight in 12–18 months, at which stage they are able to defend themselves from most predators and are released back to the mainland. Over the four years 2004–2007 a total of 47 kiwi chicks graduated from the island "crèche" and were returned to the mainland.

=== Grey-faced petrel ===
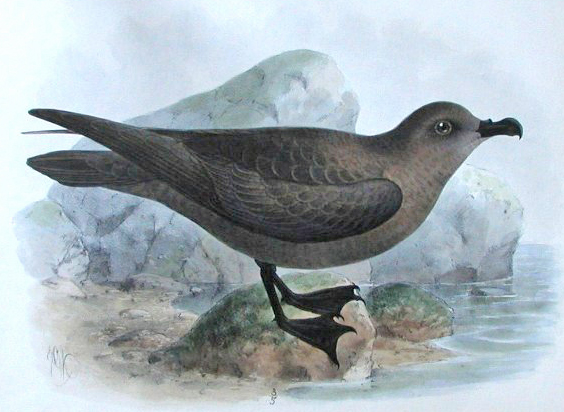
Grey-faced petrel

From 2004 to 2008 five transfers of grey-faced petrel chicks were made to the island to establish a new population of the species there. The method used was to obtain chicks from breeding colonies on Taranga (Hen Island), before they had left their nesting burrows, and transfer them to artificial burrows on Matakohe where they were fed until they fledged and departed. Over the five years of the project 152 chicks fledged successfully. The transferred chicks were banded and it is expected that the first birds should begin returning to Matakohe three to five years after fledging, to start prospecting for suitable nesting burrows and partners. Breeding may not occur until the petrels are seven years old.

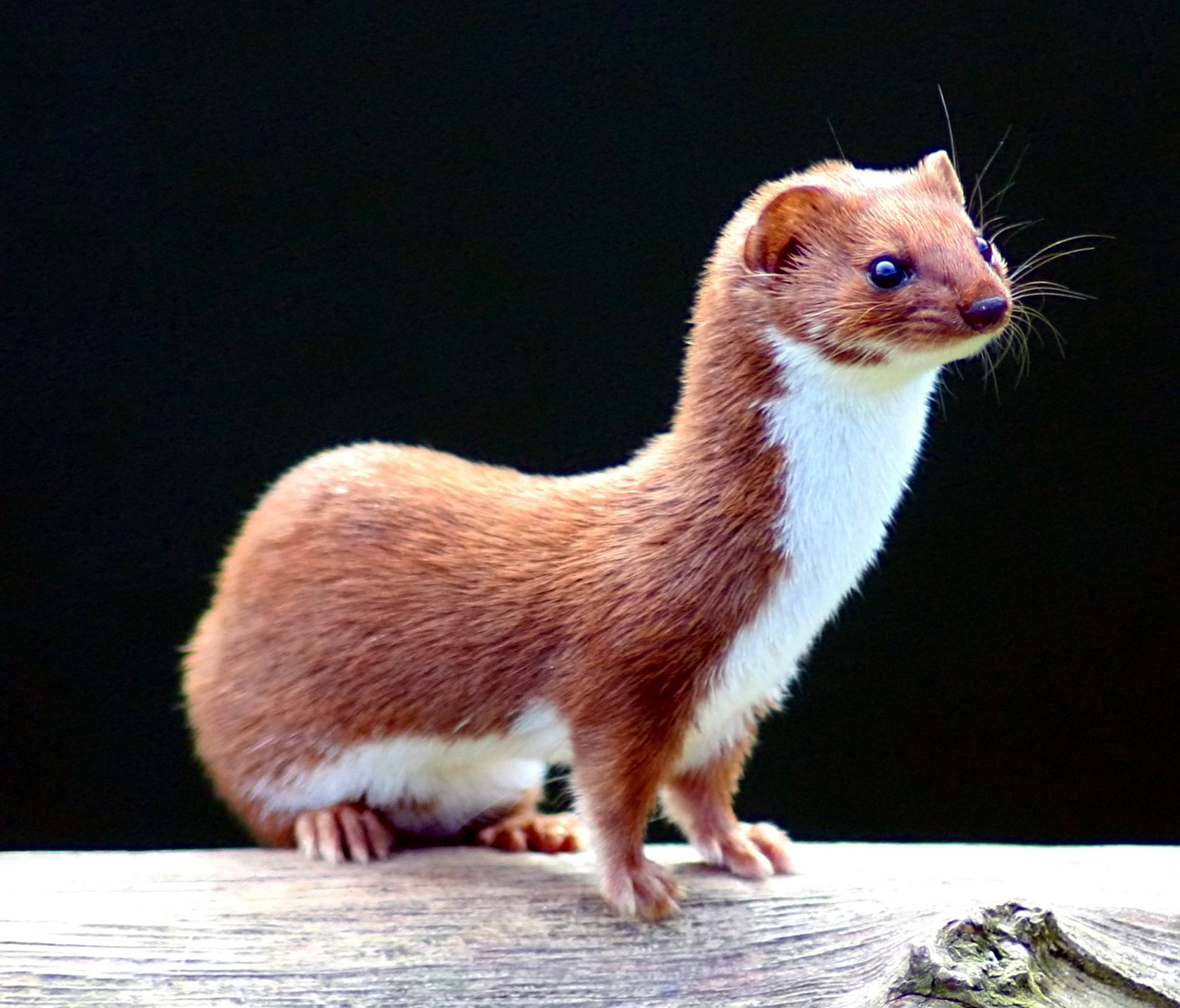
Least weasel

=== Exotic predators ===
Possums, cats, rats and mustelids have been eradicated from the Island. However, due to the proximity of the mainland and easy access across mudflats at low tide, rats, stoats and weasels are still occasional visitors to the Island. Mice have not yet been successfully eradicated, though efforts to do so continue; meanwhile, numbers are kept low with the use of poison bait stations.

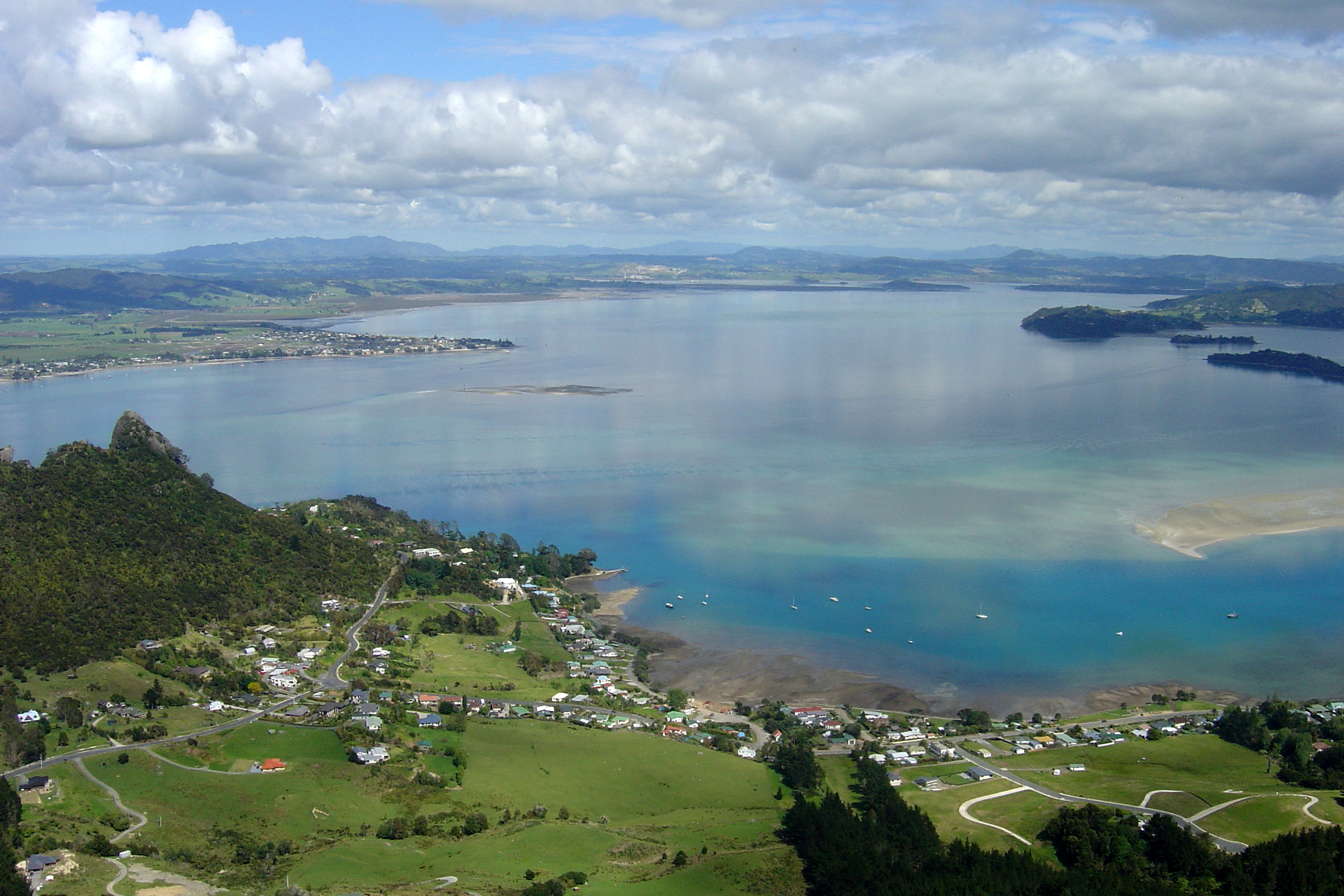
View of Whangārei Harbour

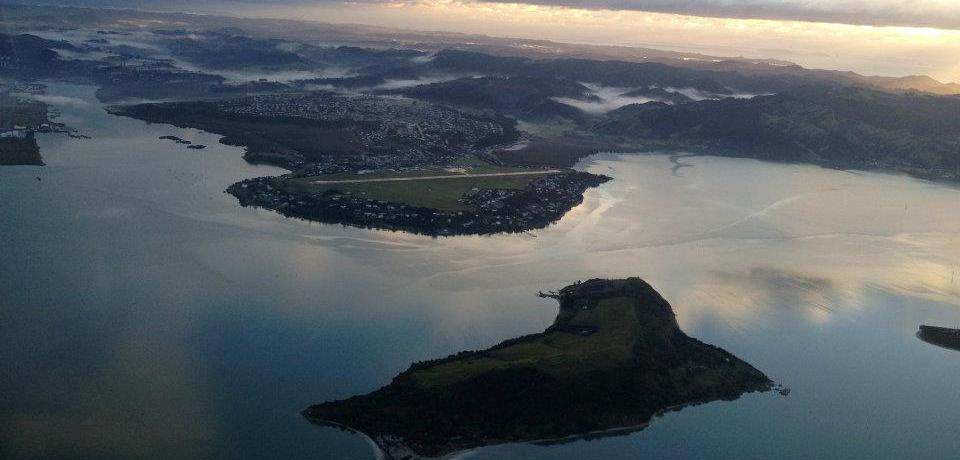
Matakohe Island (foreground)

== See also ==
- Desert island
- List of islands
