= Salt Air =

Airline of New Zealand

- Founded: 1992
- Fleet size: 5
- Headquarters: Paihia waterfront, Bay of Islands, New Zealand
- Key people: Grant Harnish (CEO /Owner)
- Website: http://www.saltair.co.nz

Salt Air is a New Zealand charter airline based at Paihia in the Bay of Islands, in the Northland Region of the North Island.

Until November 2012 Salt Air flew scheduled air services between North Shore Aerodrome in Auckland, Whangarei and the Bay of Islands, with a base at Kerikeri Airport. This 'Xpress Service' was sold to Flight Hauraki

== History ==
Salt Air is a family business that was established by Grant Harnish in December 1992. Initially it operated scenic flights around the Bay of Islands from the central Paihia waterfront in a Grumman Widgeon seaplane. The business grew steadily in the first season and it was decided to make the Bay of Islands a more permanent base. Salt Air established their head office in a new building at the seaplane ramp in Paihia.

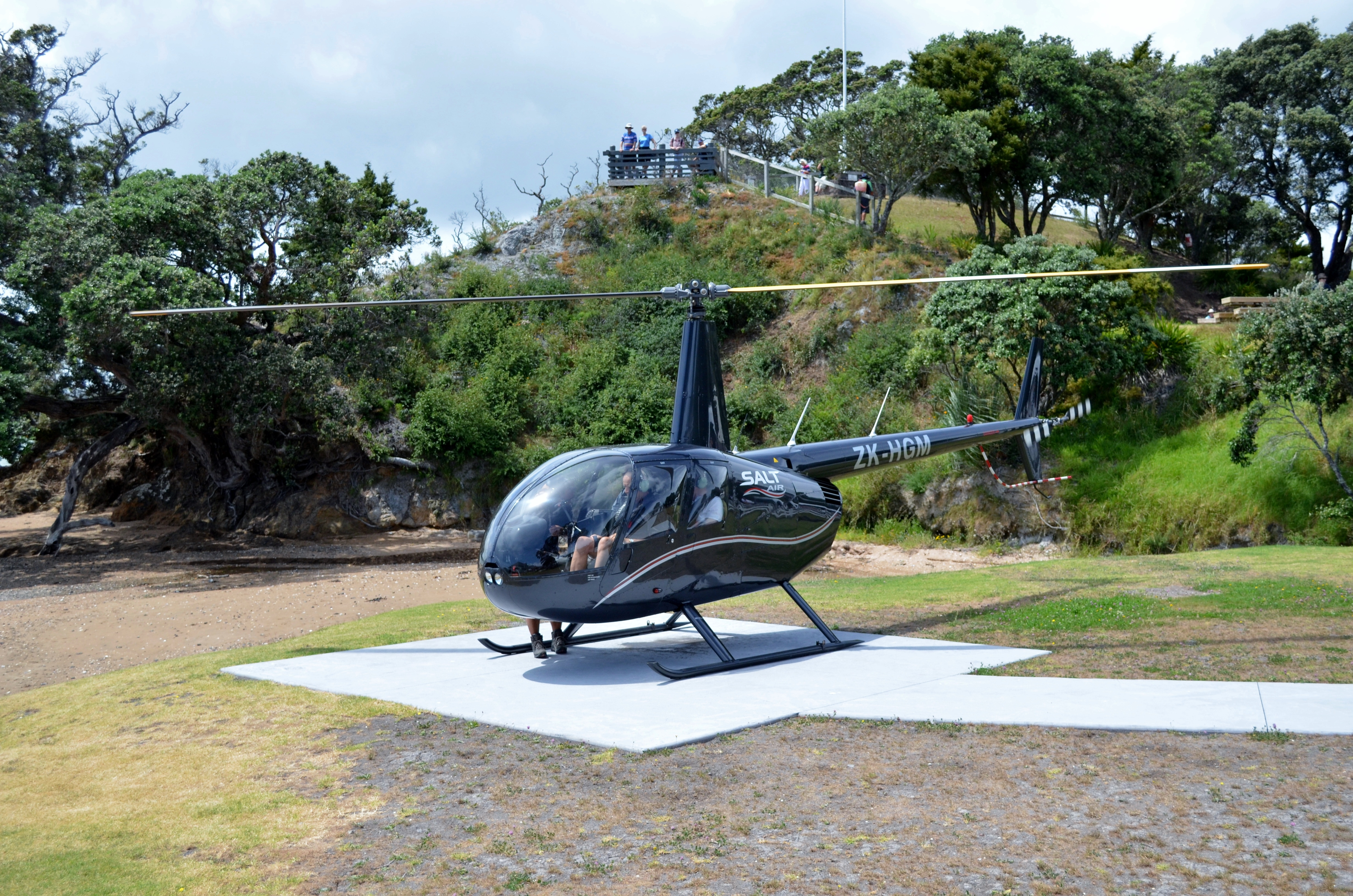
Salt Air Robinson R44 ZK-HGM at Paihia Waterfront Heliport in 2013

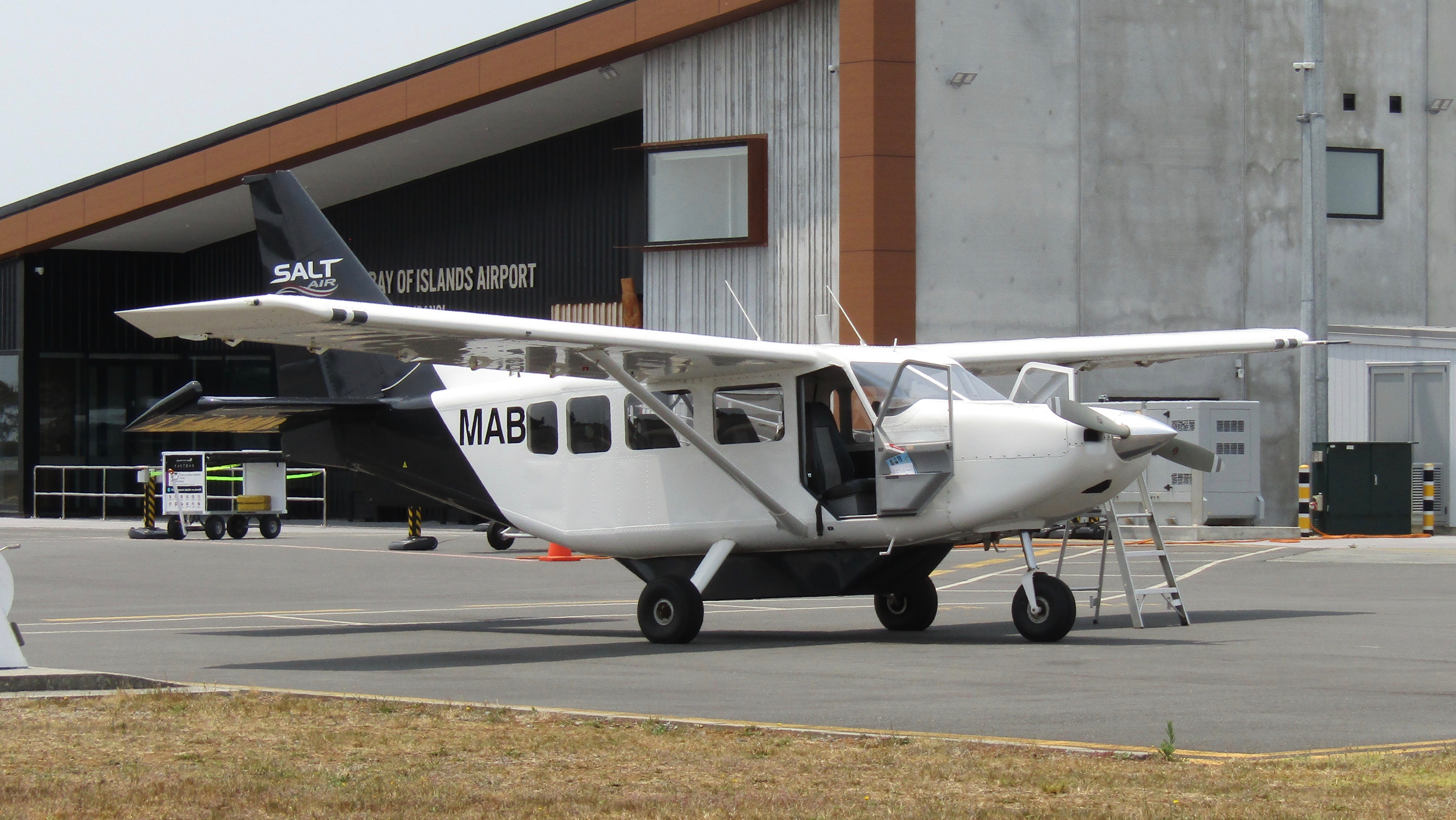
Salt Air Gippsland GA-8 ZK-MAB at Kerikeri Airport in 2020

As an extension to the seaplane operation, Salt Air began operating land-based aircraft from the airports at Haruru Falls and Kerikeri. These aircraft were in turn used for Cape Reinga tours, flying to an airstrip at Waitiki Landing, 20 kilometres from the cape. From the airstrip, passengers were taken on a van tour of Cape Reinga and the Te Paki Sand Dunes. In 2008, the airline purchased a Gippsland GA-8 Airvan for the Cape Reinga tours, operating twice daily in summer and daily in winter.

In 2001 helicopters were introduced to the operation, offering scenic flights over the Bay of Islands from the Paihia waterfront, and also charter flights.

In 2007, Salt Air purchased a Cessna Caravan to be utilised on the 'Salt Air Xpress' service from Whangarei to North Shore Aerodrome in Auckland. The bus service connected with Salt Air operated vans which took advantage of the Northern Busway to transport passengers directly to the city centre free of traffic. The service expanded to Kerikeri in mid-2008. Despite reported success, the 'Salt Air Xpress' service was sold to Flight Hauraki in 2012 to streamline operations, the last service operating on 31 October that year. The Cessna Caravan was removed from the fleet as a result.

In addition to the scenic flights, a large amount of charter work to various airports in the North Island has increased Salt Air's profile in the tourism and charter aviation scene within New Zealand.

Salt Air also uses their Longrangers for firefighting

== Fleet ==
Salt Air fleet
| Aircraft | Number | Passengers | Notes |
|---|---|---|---|
| GippsAero GA8 Airvan | 1 | 6 or 7 | Used for scheduled Cape Reinga tours. |
| Robinson R44 Raven II | 1 | 3 | |
| Bell B206L-3 Longranger | 3 | 5 or 6 | |

== Destinations ==
- Waitiki Landing for Cape Reinga
- Kerikeri
- Paihia

== See also ==
- Air transport in New Zealand
- List of airlines of New Zealand
- List of general aviation operators of New Zealand
