= Whangārei Harbour =

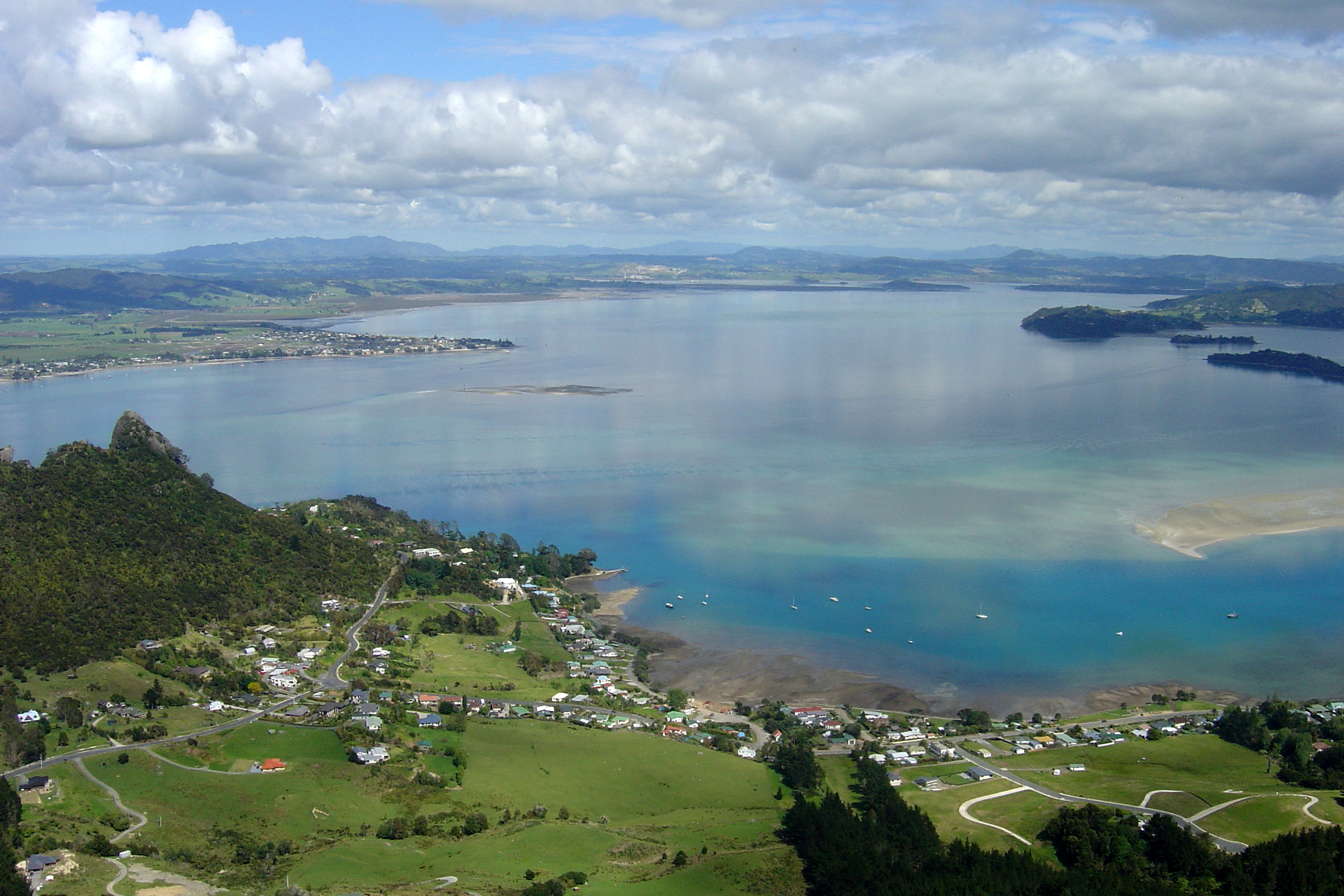
- View of Whangārei Harbour from Mount Manaia, looking west over Mcleod Bay

- Location within Northland Region
- Coordinates: 35.80°S 174.41°E
- Country: New Zealand

Area
  - Total: 101.48 km^{2} (39.18 sq mi)

Whangārei Harbour is a large harbour on the east coast of the North Island of New Zealand.

The harbour stretches from Whangārei City, and the termination of the Hātea River, south east around the Onerahi peninsula and out to the Pacific Ocean at Whangārei Heads.

Its Māori-language name (given by the Ngāti Wai iwi (tribe)) is Whangārei-te-rerenga-parāoa, meaning "the place where whales gather". Another traditional name for this area is Whangarei-o-te-tohorā – "waiting for the breastbone of whales".

== History ==
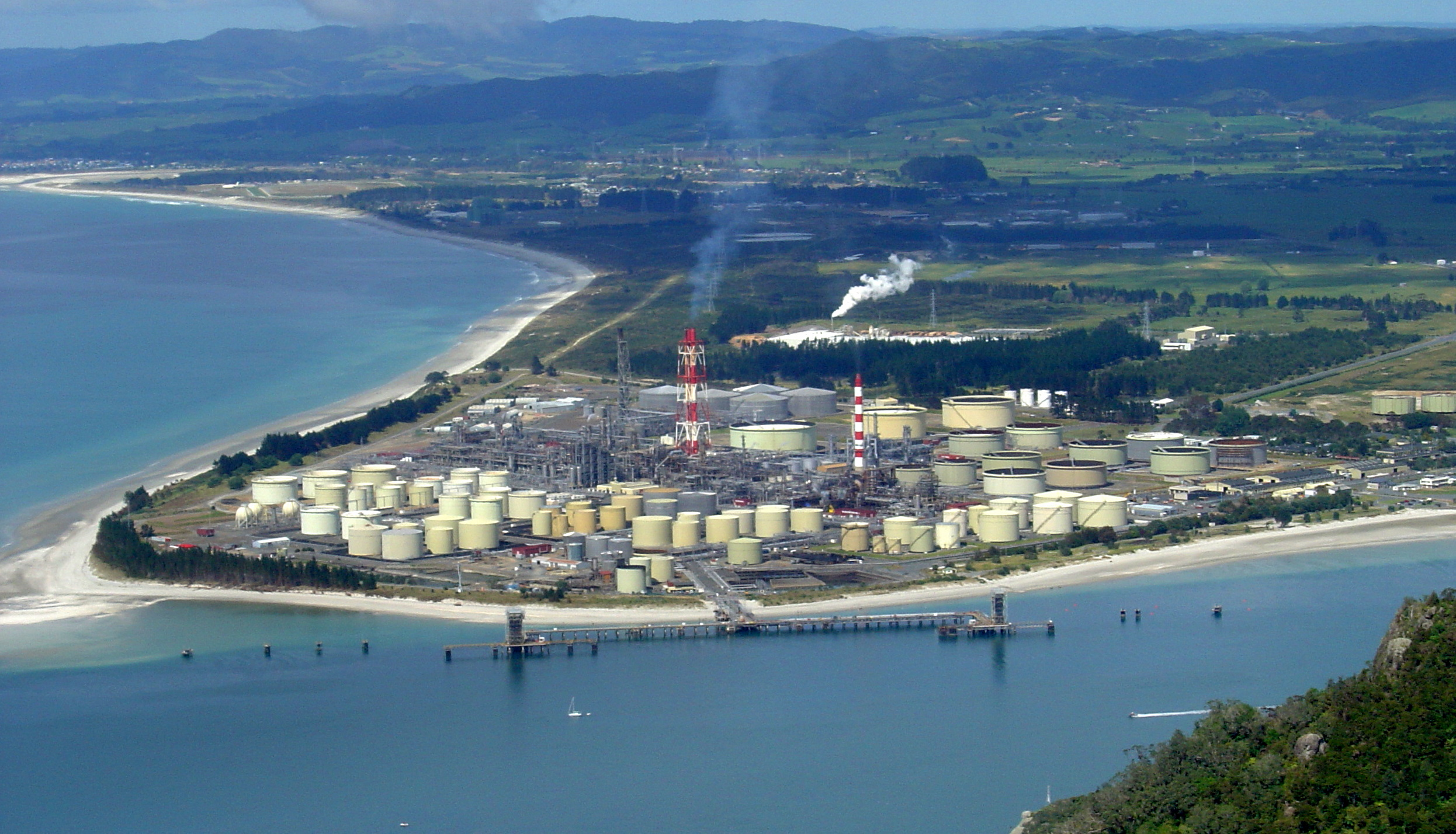
The Marsden Point Oil Refinery at the entrance of Whangārei Harbour

Many early settlers and Maori used the harbour as a form of transport, and this played a large role in the establishment of Whangārei, and many of the industries in the area. These include Portland Cement Works, Marsden Point Oil Refinery and for the extraction of coal from Kamo.

From 1911 to 1933 the Onerahi Branch Railway crossed the upper reaches of the harbour to provide rail access to a new wharf built at Onerahi, as the existing wharf in the town basin was unreachable for some craft. This further promoted the harbour as an important feature to the development of Whangārei.

In 2006, two marine reserves were opened in Whangārei Harbour. Whangarei Harbour Marine Reserve is located in an inter-tidal area between Onerahi and Waikaraka, and another around Motukaroro Island, at Reotahi, Whangārei Heads. The Motukaroro Island reserve is popular with snorkelers due to the large amount of marine life seen there.

== Geography ==
Whangārei Harbour stretches approximately 23 km north-west from Whangārei Heads to its farthest point inland at the town basin in Whangārei central. At its widest point it is approximately 6 km wide, between Parua Bay and Takahiwai, near One Tree Point.

The harbour is heavily tidal with a tidal range of approximately 2m, with much of the harbour being shallower than this in the wider parts. This means during low tide much of the harbour is mud flats and exposed sand bars. However, at the harbour entrance, where it is only around 800m wide, and between Onerahi and Matakohe Island, where it is only around 500m wide, it is up to 20m deep and currents can be strong.

This allowed for the deep water Northland Port to be built at Marsden Point and for the former ports at Whangārei and Onerahi to be located so far into the harbour.

The main rivers flowing into the harbour are Hātea River, Mangapai River, Limeburners Creek, Raumanga Stream and Otaika Creek. They carry much sediment from surrounding farmland, creating the muddy nature of the harbour, and this requires dredging in some parts for navigation purposes.

As the naming of the harbour indicates, southern right whales (Tohora) and possibly other coastal species like humpback and Bryde's whales used to gather in the harbour historically, but today it is not often to see baleen whales in the harbour due to their small population sizes and slow recoveries caused by commercial whaling by Europeans and Maoris (a whaling station was situated in the harbour), and illegal mass whaling operations by Soviet Union with supports by Japan (it is said that if these illegal operations had not taken place, the numbers of whales in New Zealand would have been three to four times larger than those of today). The first documented return of the southern right whales into the harbour was in 2002.

Smaller cetaceans such as dolphins and killer whales (orcas) can be observed in the harbour more frequently.

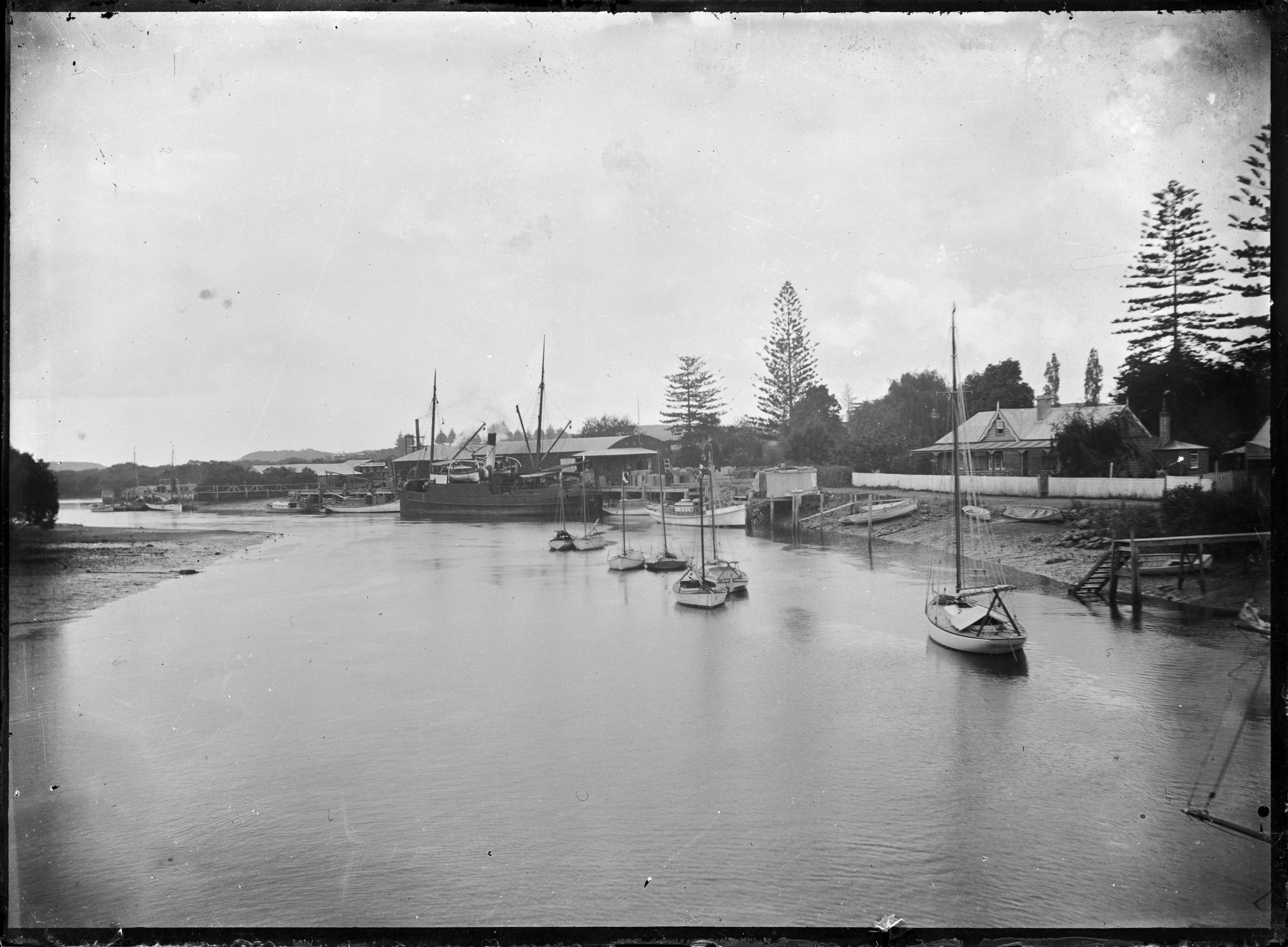
Whangārei Town Wharf, 1911

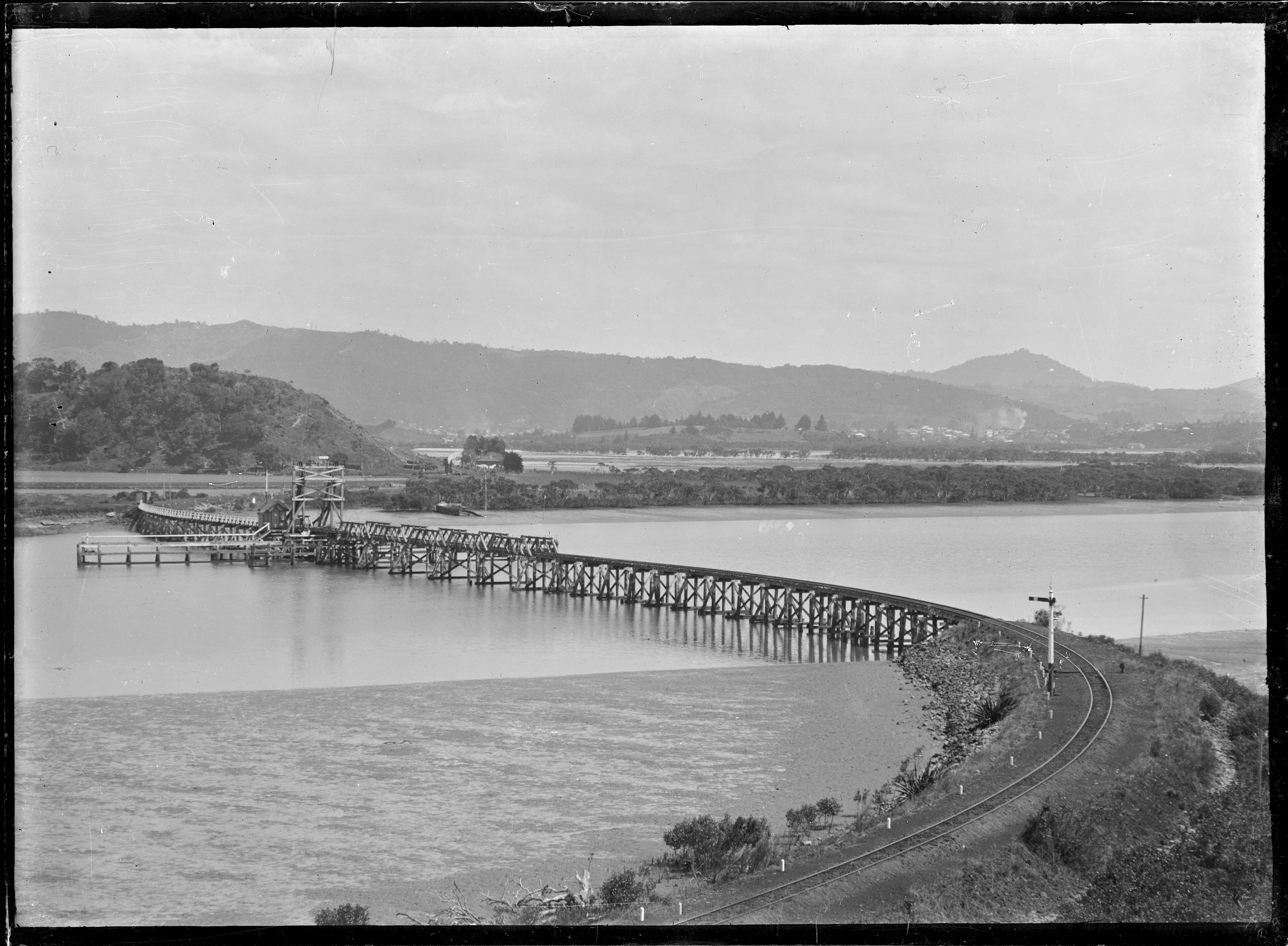
Railway bridge over the Hatea River at Port Whangārei in 1923
