= Air Auckland =

Airline of New Zealand

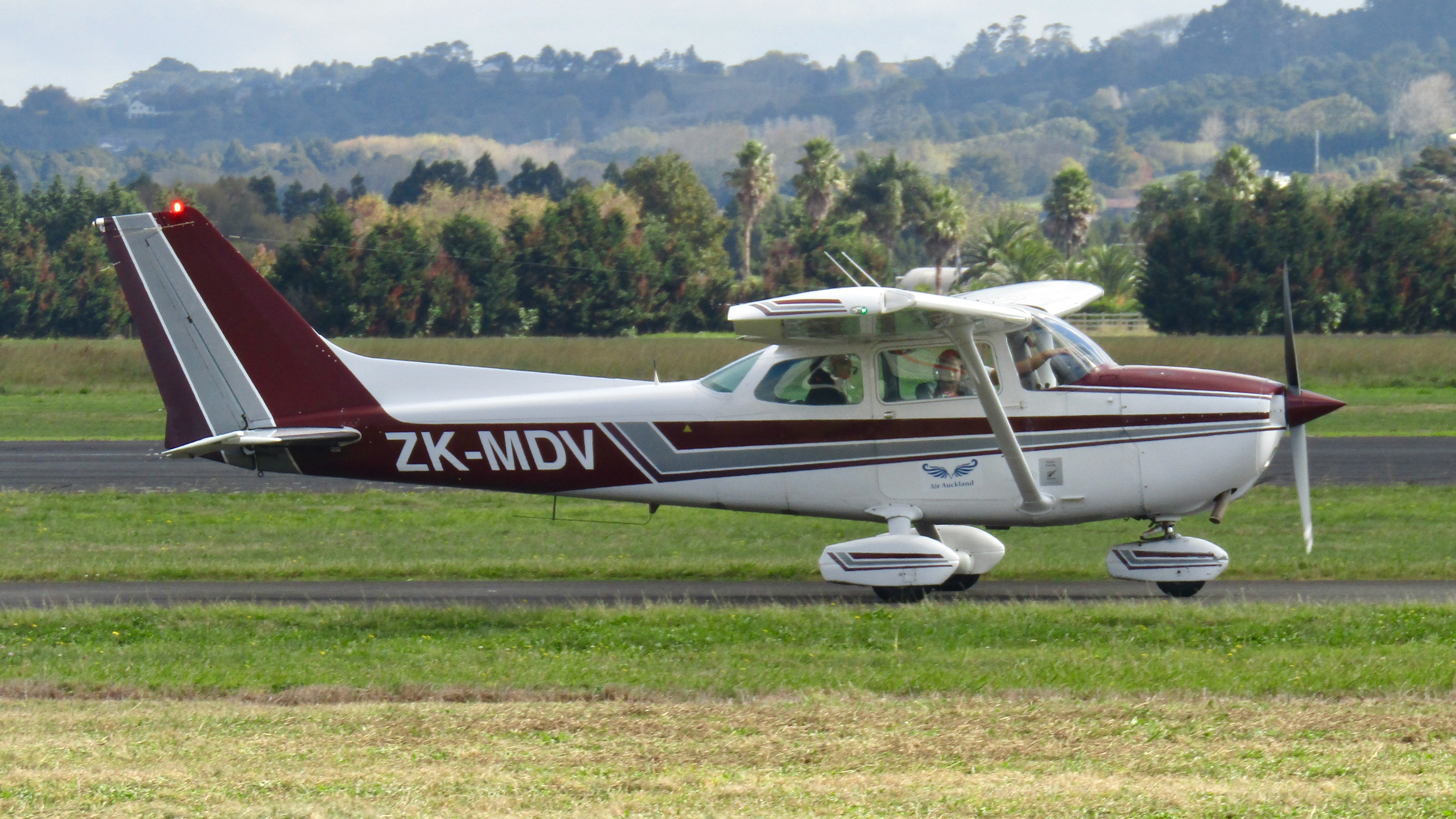
- A previously Flight Hauraki operated Cessna 172 at Ardmore in 2019, now with Air Auckland titles
IATA	ICAO	Call sign
–	HKI	HAURAKI
- Founded: 17 March 2008
- Ceased operations: May 31, 2023
- Hubs: Ardmore Airport, Ardmore, New Zealand
- Headquarters: Ardmore, New Zealand
- Website: airauckland.com

Air Auckland (formerly Flight Hauraki) was a small airline based at Ardmore Airport in New Zealand. The company was a fixed-wing and CAA part 135 air operator that offered flight services including regular flights to Whitianga and Great Barrier Island.

== History ==
Flight Hauraki Limited was founded on 17 March 2008 as an associate company of MDR Aviation Ltd, a company specialising in aircraft leases and imports.

In 2010 Flight Hauraki began operations with a charter and sightseeing service based out of the Salt Air terminal at North Shore Aerodrome. These services were operated by a fleet two Cessna 172s and Cessna 207, owned by MDR Aviation Ltd.

The airline took over management of Air Discovery's Waiheke Island based services to Auckland Airport in March 2012, as well as their sightseeing operation and flights from Great Barrier Island to Auckland.

Later in 2012, Flight Hauraki took over Salt Air's Kerikeri and Whangārei to North Shore 'Xpress' service, unique in its usage of the Northern Busway to transport passengers to the Auckland city centre relatively traffic free. However, this service failed to gain much popularity, so it was cut in February 2013, after less than three months of operation.

In 2014 the airline moved its main base to Waiheke Island and moved its satellite base to Ardmore. From Ardmore the airline began an "Island Hopper" service offering two return daily flights from Ardmore to Waiheke Island and on to Great Barrier Island. Flight Hauraki also began many daily unscheduled services to Waiheke Island on demand, aircraft based at each location.

Founder Paul McSherry sold the company to the New Zealand Aviation Group Limited in 2015, which set a greater focus on tourist operations.

The airline was renamed in 2018 to Air Auckland.

== Fleet ==
The following aircraft are operated by the airline:

- 2 Cessna 172
- 1 Cessna 206

== Destinations ==
- Ardmore
- North Shore Airport
- Great Barrier Island
  - Claris
  - Okiwi (on demand)
- Whitianga
- Coromandel
- Pauanui
- Taupō
- anywhere on the North Island in New Zealand
