= Parua Bay =

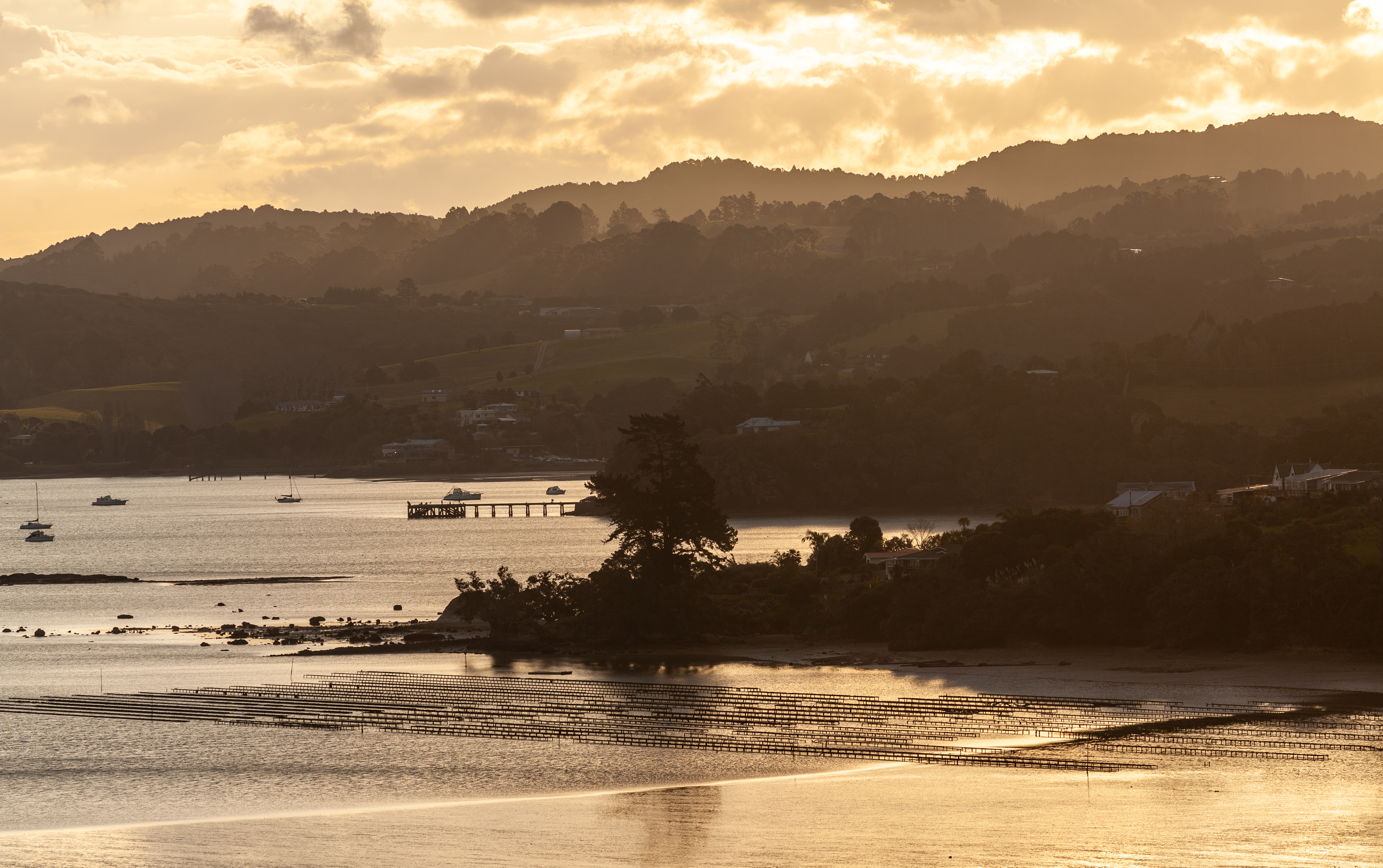
- Parua Bay, showing the Pacific oyster aquaculture farm
- Interactive map of Parua Bay
- Coordinates: 35°46′12″S 174°27′33″E
- Country: New Zealand
- Region: Northland Region
- District: Whangarei District
- Ward: Whangarei Heads Ward
- Electorates: Whangārei; Te Tai Tokerau

Government
  - Territorial Authority: Whangarei District Council
  - Regional council: Northland Regional Council
  - Mayor of Whangārei: Ken Couper
  - Whangārei MP: Shane Reti
  - Te Tai Tokerau MP: Mariameno Kapa-Kingi

Area
  - Total: 1.87 km^{2} (0.72 sq mi)

Population (June 2025)
  - Total: 640
  - Density: 340/km^{2} (890/sq mi)

Parua Bay is a locality and bay on the northern side of the Whangārei Harbour in Northland, New Zealand. Whangārei is 19 km to the west, and Whangārei Heads are 10 km to the south east, with Munro Bay between the two. The western head is called Manganese Point, and the eastern is Reserve Point. The Nook is a small bay just to the north of Reserve Point.

The bay is sheltered and about 4 km wide, with about one kilometre between the headlands. The central bay has deep water, but there are wide intertidal zones around the coast. Motukiore Island is just inside Manganese Point and joined to it by a causeway at low tide, although the only practical access is by water. The contours of a defensive pā on the island are still clearly visible.

Solomon's Point divides the bay into two. The point is named after the Māori chief Horomona-Kaikou.

== History ==
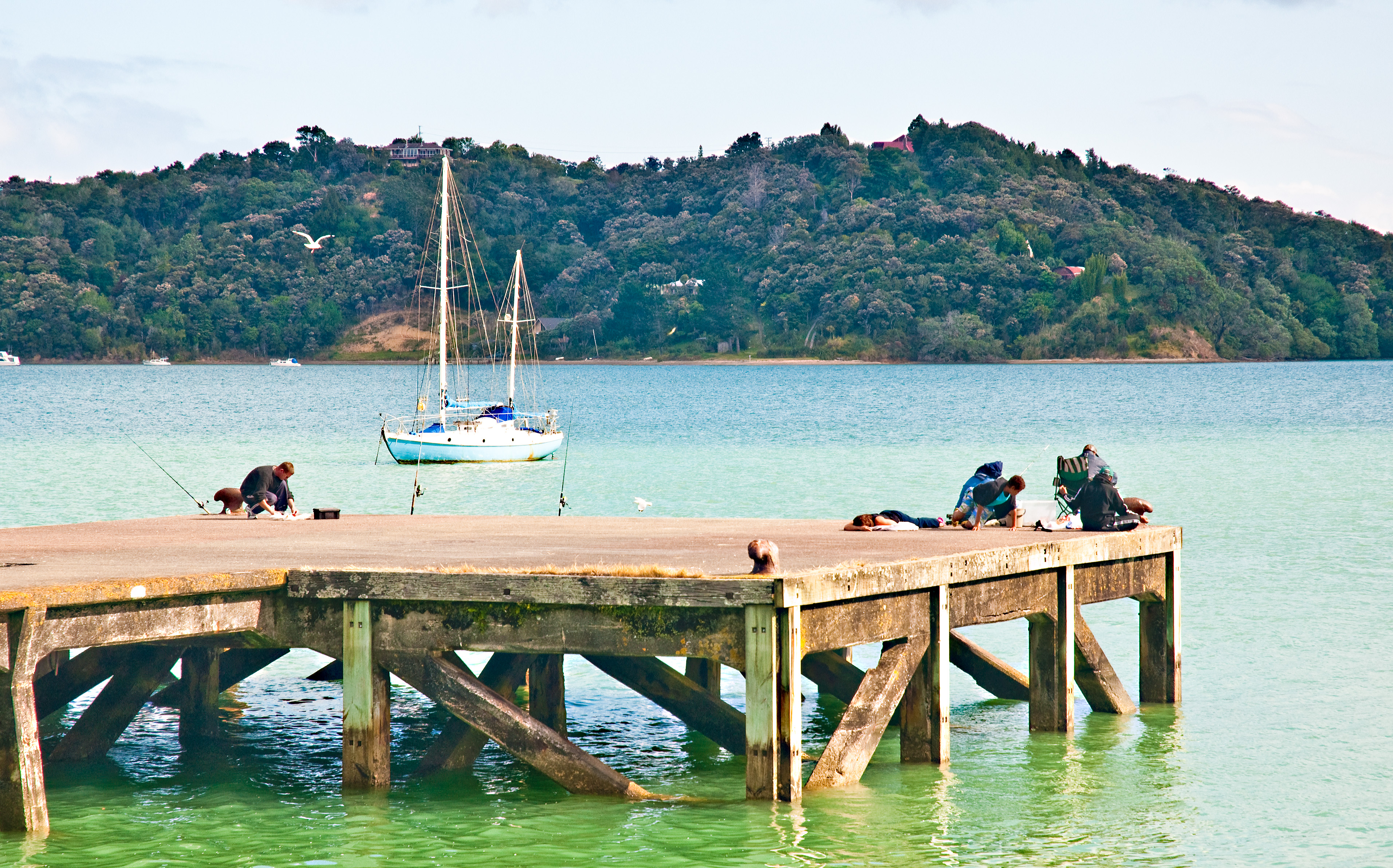
Parua Bay wharf

Raro-ngaua was a pā on the eastern side of the Parua Bay entrance in the early 19th century. In 1821 or 1822, this pā was attacked by a group of Ngāti Paoa and Waikato warriors, as part of the Musket Wars.

In 1838, Thomas Stewart Scott and two partners bought land on the western side of the bay and set up a shipbuilding yard. The Governor Fitzroy, a schooner of about 43 feet (13 m), was one of the ships built here. Manganese ore lay in lumps on the point to the south of the shipyard, then known as Te Waro but now called Manganese Point. The ore was sold in 1844. In 1849, a hydrographic survey was made of Whangārei Harbour by Captain Lort Stokes in the paddle-steamer HMS Acheron. He named Parua Bay "Bad Maori Bay" and Manganese Point "Annoyance Point".

By the mid-1850s, there were four European families living in a small settlement on the western side of the bay. The Government purchased 10,000 acres (4,000 ha) at Parua Bay in 1858, and the land was subsequently settled by people mostly under the "Forty Acre Scheme" which gave a parcel of 40 acres (16 ha) to any settler older than 18 years, subject to a few conditions.

An Irish surveyor called James Irwin Wilson settled in the Nook in 1858, and fell in love with Joanna Munro, the daughter of a Nova Scotian settler from Munro Bay. Her father, John Munro, was unhappy that Wilson had bought land that he wanted, and opposed their union. The pair tried to elope but were caught. A second elopement was successful and they married in Auckland. John Munro eventually accepted the marriage, and one of James' brothers later married Joanna's sister.

== Demographics ==
Statistics New Zealand describes Pārua Bay as a rural settlement. The settlement covers 1.87 km^{2} (0.72 sq mi) and had an estimated population of 640 as of June 2025, with a population density of 342 people per km^{2}. The settlement is part of the larger Pārua Bay statistical area.

Historical population for the settlement
Year	Pop.	±% p.a.
2006	399	—
2013	474	+2.49%
2018	597	+4.72%
2023	636	+1.27%

Pārua Bay had a population of 636 in the 2023 New Zealand census, an increase of 39 people (6.5%) since the 2018 census, and an increase of 162 people (34.2%) since the 2013 census. There were 321 males, 315 females and 3 people of other genders in 222 dwellings. 1.9% of people identified as LGBTIQ+. The median age was 45.1 years (compared with 38.1 years nationally). There were 156 people (24.5%) aged under 15 years, 60 (9.4%) aged 15 to 29, 291 (45.8%) aged 30 to 64, and 129 (20.3%) aged 65 or older.

People could identify as more than one ethnicity. The results were 93.9% European (Pākehā); 11.3% Māori; 0.5% Pasifika; 3.8% Asian; 0.5% Middle Eastern, Latin American and African New Zealanders (MELAA); and 1.4% other, which includes people giving their ethnicity as "New Zealander". English was spoken by 99.5%, Māori language by 2.4%, and other languages by 9.0%. No language could be spoken by 0.9% (e.g. too young to talk). New Zealand Sign Language was known by 0.5%. The percentage of people born overseas was 28.3, compared with 28.8% nationally.

Religious affiliations were 23.1% Christian, 0.9% Buddhist, and 0.5% other religions. People who answered that they had no religion were 69.8%, and 5.7% of people did not answer the census question.

Of those at least 15 years old, 126 (26.2%) people had a bachelor's or higher degree, 216 (45.0%) had a post-high school certificate or diploma, and 78 (16.2%) people exclusively held high school qualifications. The median income was $42,900, compared with $41,500 nationally. 93 people (19.4%) earned over $100,000 compared to 12.1% nationally. The employment status of those at least 15 was that 210 (43.8%) people were employed full-time, 93 (19.4%) were part-time, and 9 (1.9%) were unemployed.

=== Pārua Bay statistical area ===
Pārua Bay statistical area covers 39.16 km^{2} (15.12 sq mi) and had an estimated population of 2,550 as of June 2025, with a population density of 65 people per km^{2}.

Historical population for the statistical area
Year	Pop.	±% p.a.
2006	1,926	—
2013	2,013	+0.63%
2018	2,460	+4.09%
2023	2,574	+0.91%

The statistical area had a population of 2,574 in the 2023 New Zealand census, an increase of 114 people (4.6%) since the 2018 census, and an increase of 561 people (27.9%) since the 2013 census. There were 1,254 males, 1,317 females and 3 people of other genders in 1,002 dwellings. 2.0% of people identified as LGBTIQ+. The median age was 51.9 years (compared with 38.1 years nationally). There were 444 people (17.2%) aged under 15 years, 264 (10.3%) aged 15 to 29, 1,170 (45.5%) aged 30 to 64, and 699 (27.2%) aged 65 or older.

People could identify as more than one ethnicity. The results were 90.8% European (Pākehā); 16.2% Māori; 2.3% Pasifika; 2.8% Asian; 0.3% Middle Eastern, Latin American and African New Zealanders (MELAA); and 2.8% other, which includes people giving their ethnicity as "New Zealander". English was spoken by 98.7%, Māori language by 3.4%, Samoan by 0.3%, and other languages by 7.9%. No language could be spoken by 1.0% (e.g. too young to talk). New Zealand Sign Language was known by 0.3%. The percentage of people born overseas was 24.2, compared with 28.8% nationally.

Religious affiliations were 25.1% Christian, 0.1% Hindu, 0.1% Islam, 1.0% Māori religious beliefs, 0.5% Buddhist, 0.6% New Age, 0.2% Jewish, and 0.7% other religions. People who answered that they had no religion were 63.4%, and 8.6% of people did not answer the census question.

Of those at least 15 years old, 462 (21.7%) people had a bachelor's or higher degree, 1,119 (52.5%) had a post-high school certificate or diploma, and 393 (18.5%) people exclusively held high school qualifications. The median income was $40,200, compared with $41,500 nationally. 318 people (14.9%) earned over $100,000 compared to 12.1% nationally. The employment status of those at least 15 was that 927 (43.5%) people were employed full-time, 342 (16.1%) were part-time, and 27 (1.3%) were unemployed.

== Education ==
Parua Bay School is a coeducational full primary (years 1–8) school with a roll of 291 students as of July 2026. The school was established on Owhiwa Road in 1871 and moved to its present location the following year. It was initially called Kirikiri School.
