= Kate Williams (rugby union) =

Welsh international rugby union player

- Born: 5 April 2000 (age 26) Swansea, Wales
- Height: 170 cm (5 ft 7 in)
- Weight: 78 kg (172 lb; 12 st 4 lb)

Rugby union career
- Position: Flanker
- Current team: Gloucester-Hartpury
Amateur team(s)
Years	Team	Apps	(Points)
- North Shore RFC
- North Harbour U18
- East Coast Bays RFC
Senior career
Years	Team	Apps	(Points)
2017–2022	North Harbour	24	(20)
2021	Blues	1	(0)
2023–	Gloucester-Hartpury	24	(5)
- Correct as of 24 January 2025
International career
Years	Team	Apps	(Points)
2023–	Wales	24	(20)

Kate Williams (born 5 April 2000) is a Welsh international rugby union player for Gloucester-Hartpury in Premiership Women's Rugby, as well as the Wales national team.

== Early life and career ==
Kate Williams was born on 5 April 2000 in Swansea, Wales. At the age of four, she moved to Auckland, New Zealand. While in New Zealand, she began playing rugby union for North Shore RFC. She then played at Glenfield College, North Harbour Under-18, and East Coast Bays RFC.

Outside of rugby, she was an officer in the Royal New Zealand Navy.

== Rugby career ==
Williams played at the top level with the North Harbour Hibiscus in the Farah Palmer Cup from 2017 to 2022, she was captain of the team in 2020 and 2021. In addition, she also played in the first women's Super Rugby game in New Zealand's history, she played for the Blues against the Chiefs Manawa in May 2021.

During the 2021 Rugby World Cup in New Zealand, she was called up for the first time with Wales following an injury to Alisha Butchers. She had previously trained with Wales after her friends and family sent videos of her playing in New Zealand to the Welsh head coach.

In March 2023, she signed for the English club Gloucester-Hartpury. The same month, she was selected in the Welsh squad for the Six Nations. During the competition, she made her international debut and played all five matches. In the autumn of 2023, she returned to New Zealand with Wales to play in the WXV tournament.

She was named in Wales squad for the 2025 Six Nations Championship on 4 March 2025. On 11 August 2025, she was selected in the Welsh side to the Women's Rugby World Cup in England.
