= Rex Pollock =

New Zealand rugby union player

- Born: Rex William Reece Pollock; 1 December 1992 (age 33) New Zealand
- Height: 1.92 m (6 ft 3 1/2 in)
- Weight: 108 kg (17.0 st; 238 lb)
- School: Kristin School
- University: University of Canterbury

Rugby union career
- Position: Lock
Youth career
- Takapuna
Amateur team(s)
Years	Team	Apps	(Points)
2015–	North Shore	102	
- Correct as of 20 July 2024
Senior career
Years	Team	Apps	(Points)
2015	East Coast	8	(0)
2019–2020	Club de Rugby Santander	17	(10)
2023	North Harbour	1	(0)
- Correct as of 30 September 2023

Rex William Reece Pollock (born 1 December 1992) is a New Zealand rugby union player, currently playing for North Shore in the North Harbour Rugby Premier 1. His preferred position is Lock.

== Early and personal life ==
Pollock his the son of former North Harbour player and coach Allan Pollock.

== Amateur career ==
Pollock plays for North Shore. On 28 June 2024, Pollock made his 100th appearance for the club against Mahurangi.

== Professional career ==
Pollock signed for East Coast for the 2015 season of the Heartland Championship, debuting against Poverty Bay on 22 August 2015. He went on to make eight appearances for the club as they finished in last spot.

Pollock played for Club de Rugby Santander for the 2019–20 División de Honor de Rugby where he made 17 appearances and scored two tries.

In 2023 Pollock signed for North Harbour as a development player for the 2023 season. Pollock made his debut in the final game of the season away to Taranaki.

== Honours ==
North Shore

- North Harbour Rugby Premier 1: 2023, 2024, 2025

North Shore

- North Shore Player of the Year: 2025
