= Glenfield Rugby Union and Sports Club Inc =

Club in Auckland, New Zealand

Coordinates: 36°46′55″S 174°42′58″E

Glenfield Rugby Union and Sports Club Inc. is a sports club based in Glenfield, a suburb of Auckland, New Zealand.

== History ==
The club was formed in 1969 after a meeting between local rugby enthusiasts, some affiliated with Northcote Rugby, and then secretary of the Auckland Rugby Union, Link Warren.

With the support of the Auckland Rugby Union, a new club (under the umbrella of Northcote Rugby Union) was formed known as the Glenfield Rugby Football Club.

The original club was located on Archers Road, currently home to the Glenfield Rovers Football Club. Two or three years would pass before the North Shore City Council would provide new grounds to the club on former strawberry fields at Kaipatiki Road.

Glenfield Rugby club was awarded senior status by the Auckland Rugby Union in 1973. From 1974 to 1984, Glenfield fielded a senior team in the Auckland Rugby Union third division. The Glenfield Grizzlies Presidents Grade side was also formed in 1975 by club stalwarts Glen "Bungy" Williams, Ken Cooksley, Ted Wilson, and Roy Doddrell. In 1985, the Glenfield Grizzlies team had the honour of playing at Twickenham in London, England. Glenfield club members refer to it jokingly as "the game that made Twickenham famous".

From 1985 to 2019, Glenfield played in the Senior A division of the North Harbour Club rugby competition. For the 2019 and 2020 seasons Glenfield only fielded a team in the North Harbour Senior Reserves competition, before returning to play in the premier division of the North Harbour club competition in 2021. In 1986, Mark Hellyer became the first provincial player to be selected from Glenfield to play for the newly formed North Harbour Rugby Union. In 1987 Glenfield changed their colours from rust jerseys and blacks shorts to red and white jerseys with black shorts. Glenfield now plays in red, black and white hoops.

In 1989, Walter Little was the first All Black to be selected from the Glenfield club. Little went on to play for the New Zealand All Blacks from 1989 to 1998, playing in 55 test matches. Little also shares the record for most games played (147) for North Harbour, alongside Ron Williams, who played for the Northcote club. Walter's son Michael also represented Harbour from the Glenfield club and now plays his rugby in Japan. The Littles were the second father-son combination to be selected for North Harbour, alongside Frano and Jacob Botica from the North Shore club.

Glenfield has been North Harbour Senior A club rugby runners-up twice, in 2000 and 2006. Glenfield has won two Under 21 Championships, in 1987 and 2008. Glenfield has also won a Senior C Championship in 1992, when they defeated Northcote at Onewa Domain.

Mark Hellyer (Glenfield Premiers 1981–1996) holds the record for most senior games played for Glenfield with 243 games.

Colours: Red, white and black jersey, Black shorts, Blacks socks with red and white bands

== Championships ==
North Harbour Championships since 1985:

North Harbour Under 21s: Champions (2) 1987, 2008. Runners-up 1985, 2002, 2003, 2007

North Harbour Senior C: Champions (1) 1992. Runners-up 1990,1991,1997

North Harbour Premiership: Runners-up 2000, 2006.

North Harbour Senior 1sts: Runners-up 1997.

== Rivalries with other rugby clubs ==
Though overshadowed by the success of neighbouring clubs such as Northcote, Takapuna and East Coast Bays, Glenfield has strong rivalries with their neighbours, in particular the Northcote–Birkenhead Rugby club.

Glenfield v Northcote

Glenfield verses Northcote has always been classed as a friendly and respectful rivalry between the two clubs. Northcote were instrumental in helping to start the Glenfield club as a junior feeder club in 1969.

To many this rivalry would be seen as a "Derby of contrasts", as Northcote have established themselves as a North Harbour club rugby powerhouse winning numerous titles across all grades.

Glenfield and Northcote have met in three Under 21 Championship finals (1987, 2002, 2003) with Glenfield winning in 1987, and Northcote winning in 2002 and 2003.

Glenfield and Northcote have also met in three Senior C finals between in 1990, 1991, 1992 with Northcote winning in 1990, 1991 and Glenfield winning in 1992. The North Harbour Senior C competition trophy is named the Ted Wilson Cup after the late Glenfield rugby club stalwart and GRFC Life member Ted Wilson.

Glenfield v North Shore

The Frazer King Memorial trophy is played for between Glenfield and North Shore. Frazer was a North Harbour referee who died suddenly whilst refereeing a premier game between Glenfield and North Shore at Devonport Domain in 1985.

Glenfield v Marist North Harbour

The Birkenhead Transport has been played for between Glenfield and Marist North Harbour since 1989. The fact Glenfield and Marist are yet to win a North Harbour Premiership adds a lot of intense rivalry and colour to the games between the two clubs. The often games are often very close in scorelines between the two teams.

Glenfield v Mahurangi

When Mahurangi RFC joined the Harbour club comp in 1989, Glenfield was their first game. This is classed as a traditional game for Mahurangi as Glenfield is the first club they played in the Harbour club competition.

Glenfield v Takapuna

Glenfield v Takapuna is one of North Harbour rugby's many suburban rivalries. Though when it comes to success both clubs are at opposite ends of the scale. Takapuna is by far the most successful North Harbour club winning twelve Harbour premierships. In the Auckland club competition days Takapuna was a regular team in the Auckland top division winning two Gallaher shields, whereas Glenfield played in the Auckland third division and were often on the end of some rather unflattering scorelines. Glenfield has met Takapuna twice in the North Harbour premiership final with Takapuna winning both times (2000 and 2006). Glenfield ended Takapuna's famous two year winning streak in 2001. Glenfield beat Takapuna in 2015, a game which was also Jeremy Hikuroa's 200th game for the Glenfield Premiers.

Glenfield v Waitakere City

Glenfield plays an annual pre–season fixture each year with Auckland club Waitakere City.

== Notable players ==
- Walter Little – All Black
- Mark Mayerhofler – Blues Rugby, North Harbour, (Made All back debut from Christchurch Rugby club)
- Chris Mayerhofler – NZ Maori All Black
- Horace Lewis – NZ Maori All Black
- Nicky Little – Fijian International
- Lawrence Little– Fijian International
- Francis Latu – Tongan International
- Issi Tuivai –Tongan international
- Stephen Doherty – Cook Islands representative
- Chas Ferris – NZ Maori coach

=== Glenfield Rugby Club centurions ===
The following players have played 100 or more senior games for the club:

- Richie Campbell: Premier debut 1974; centurion game 1979
- Wayne Gardener: Premier debut 1974; centurion game 1984
- Mark Hellyer: Premier debut 1981; centurion game 1986, double centurion 1991
- Colin Newman: Premier debut 1981; centurion game 1986, double centurion 1992
- Steve Roiall: Premier debut 1981; centurion game 1986
- Lee Maihi: Premier debut 1977; centurion game 1987
- Neil Kennedy: Premier debut 1980; centurion game 1987
- Tony Keepa: Premier debut 1984; centurion game 1989
- Issi Tuivai: Premier debut 1987; centurion game 1992
- Craig Lawrence: Premier debut 1988; centurion game 1992
- Myles Ferris: Premier debut 1989; centurion game 1994
- Haydn Ferris: Premier debut 1989; centurion game 1994, double centurion – 2002
- David 'Doc' Van Praagh: Premier debut 1989; centurion game 1995
- Jason Matthews: Premier debut 1988; centurion game 1997
- Stephen Doherty: Premier debut 1992; centurion game 1998
- Chris Mayerhofler: Premier debut 1992; centurion game 1998
- Alan Linstrom: Premier debut 1993; centurion game 1999, double centurion 2005
- Adriaan Ferris: Premier debut 1993; centurion game 1999
- Richard Shaw: Premier debut 1995; centurion game 2001
- Manu Faiva: Premier debut 1993; centurion game 2001
- Metu Egelani: Premier debut 1998; centurion game 2004
- Brett Ingham: Premier debut 1997; centurion game 2005
- Jeremy Hikuroa: Premier debut 1997; centurion game 2007, double centurion 2015
- Simon Fincham: Premier debut 2001; centurion game 2007
- Tanimo Samoa: Premier debut 2005; centurion game 2012
- Shea Turner: Premier debut 2007; centurion game 2012
- Paul Turner: Premier debut 1998; centurion game 2014
- Baden Woodman: Premier debut 1999; centurion game 2014

== Premier coaches ==
- 1985–86: ?
- 1987: Bert McLean
- 1988–90: Lindsay Ellery/Richard Curtis
- 1991–94: Chas Ferris
- 1995–96: Lindsay Ellery/Richard Curtis
- 1997–99: Tony Keepa/Neil Kennedy
- 2000–01: Haydn Ferris/Steve Eskrigge
- 2002 Tony Keepa/Lindsay Ellery
- 2003: Tony Keepa/Lee Maihi
- 2004–06: Walter Little/Mark Hellyer
- 2007–08: Ray "Jr" Wells/Brett Ingham
- 2009–12: Walter Little/Jeremy Hikuroa
- 2013–15: Walter Little/Jeremy Hikuroa
- 2016–18: Jeremy Hikuroa/Edwin Smith
