= Scott Penny =

Irish rugby union player (b. 1999)

- Born: 22 September 1999 (age 27) Dublin, Ireland
- Height: 1.82 m (5 ft 11 1/2 in)
- Weight: 101.82 kg (16.034 st; 224.5 lb)
- School: St Michael's College
- University: University College Dublin

Rugby union career
- Position: Flanker
Amateur team(s)
| Years | Team | Apps | (Points) |
| 2018– | UCD | | |
Senior career
| Years | Team | Apps | (Points) |
| 2018– | Leinster | 103 | (195) |
- Correct as of 21 March 2026
International career
| Years | Team | Apps | (Points) |
| 2019 | Ireland U20 | 5 | (10) |
- Correct as of 15 March 2019

Scott Penny (born 22 September 1999) is an Irish rugby union player for Leinster. His preferred position is openside flanker.

== Early life ==
Penny attended St Michael's College, where he starred on several cup rugby teams.

== Leinster ==
After leaving school in June 2018 he immediately entered the Leinster Rugby academy at the age of 18. While still in his first year in the academy Penny scored eight tries in seven games for Leinster 'A' in their victorious Celtic Cup campaign. This rake of tries, highly unusual for a forward, included a hat-trick against the Ospreys development team in a man-of-the-match performance.

Less than two months after turning 19 Penny made his Leinster senior debut against Ospreys in November 2018, capping a strong performance with a try. Due to his involvement with Leinster 'A' during the Celtic Cup, Penny made his debut for the Leinster senior team before playing for UCD in the All-Ireland League or even for the Ireland u-20s. His second Leinster appearance followed against Dragons. He was named the Pro14 Next-Gen Star of the Season for the 2020–21 Pro14 season. His strong performance in the 2020–21 Championship, also earned him his first spot on the Pro14 Dream Team. Penny was named to the 2022–23 URC Elite XV of the year.

== Honours ==
=== Leinster ===
- United Rugby Championship: 4 (2019, 2020, 2021, 2025)

=== Leinster 'A' ===
- Celtic Cup: 2 (2019, 2020)

=== Ireland Under-20s ===
- Six Nations Under 20s Championship: 1 (2019)
- Grand Slam: 1 (2019)
- Triple Crown: 1 (2019)

=== Individual ===
- Pro14 Young Player of the Year: 1 (2021)
- United Rugby Championship Team of the Season: 2 (2021, 2023)
- Pro14 Top Try Scorer: 1 (2021)
