= Farah Palmer Cup =

Women's rugby union tournament

- Current season, competition or edition: 2026 Farah Palmer Cup
- Sport: Rugby Union
- Founded: 1999; 27 years ago
- Owner: New Zealand Rugby Union
- No. of teams: 13
- Country: New Zealand
- Most recent champion: Waikato (2nd Premiership Title)
- Most titles: Auckland (16 Titles)
- Broadcasters: Sky Sport; TVNZ
- Sponsor: Toyota Hilux
- Related competitions: Heartland Championship; National Provincial Championship
- Website: provincial.rugby/farah-palmer-cup

The Farah Palmer Cup (formerly known as Women's Provincial Championship until 2016) is the highest level domestic amateur women's rugby union competition in New Zealand. It is held annually from early July to mid September and managed by the New Zealand Rugby Union (NZRU). The competition was first introduced in 1999, with a total of fourteen teams competing initially. The number of teams increased to eighteen in the year 2000, but later decreased to as few as six teams, with 13 currently featured.

The tournament is named after the former Black Ferns captain, Farah Palmer and since 2026, it has been known as the Farah Palmer Cup presented by Hilux after Toyota Hilux, its naming rights sponsor.

Canterbury are the current holders of the JJ Stewart Trophy, the women's equivalent of the Ranfurly Shield. The Farah Palmer Cup is an amateur competition; players are not paid salaries and hold jobs outside of rugby. The competition was previously played under such names as the Women's National Provincial Championship, the Lion Foundation Cup, the Women's Championship, and the Women's Competition.

== Competition format ==
Originally, the cup was arranged in one division, with all 12 teams facing each other at least once. The top four teams then met in semi-finals. From 2011 to 2014, the semi-finals round was eliminated and the top two teams automatically qualified for the finals. In 2015, the semi-finals round was reintroduced.

In 2017, the Farah Palmer Cup was split into two divisions with promotion and relegation between the two. The top division was named the Premiership while the bottom was called the Championship. A team played every team in their division once in the regular season before a semi-final and final for each division. In 2019 Northland joined the competition, causing the Premiership to expand to seven teams and leaving the Championship with six.

In 2020 the competition was instead run in two pools split geographically between the north and south of New Zealand. The north pool contained seven teams and the south pool contained six; a single round robin was played in each pool. The top two teams from each pool took part in crossover semi-finals, with the final being held a week later.

In 2021 and 2022, the FPC reverted to its 2017 format with the 13 teams being split into Premiership and Championship. As before, a round-robin format was used in the regular season, followed by semi-finals and a grand final.

== Teams ==
Locations of the Farah Palmer Cup teams

| Colours | Union | Town/City, Region | Stadium | Capacity | Established | Head coach | Super Rugby Aupiki Affiliation |
Premiership
| | Auckland | Auckland* | Eden Park | 50,000 | 1883 | Willie Walker | Blues Women |
| | Bay of Plenty | Mount Maunganui, Bay of Plenty | Rotorua International Stadium; Tauranga Domain | 26,000; 5,000 | 1911 | Paul Tietjens | Chiefs Manawa |
| | Canterbury | Christchurch, Canterbury | Orangetheory Stadium | 18,000 | 1879 | Blair Baxter | Matatū |
| | Counties Manukau | Pukekohe, Auckland | Navigation Homes Stadium | 12,000 | 1955 | Chad Shepherd | Blues Women |
| | Manawatū | Palmerston North, Manawatū | Central Energy Trust Arena | 15,000 | 1886 | Fusi Feaunati | Hurricanes Poua |
| | Waikato | Hamilton, Waikato | FMG Stadium Waikato | 25,800 | 1921 | James Semple | Chiefs Manawa |
Championship
| | Hawke's Bay | Napier, Hawke's Bay | McLean Park | 19,700 | 1884 | Blair Cross, Stephen Woods | Unknown |
| | North Harbour | Albany, Auckland | North Harbour Stadium | 25,000 | 1985 | Duncan McGrory | Unknown |
| | Northland | Whangārei, Northland | Semenoff Stadium | 30,000 | 1920 | Cheryl Smith | Blues Women |
| | Otago | Dunedin, Otago | Forsyth Barr Stadium | 30,748 | 1881 | Scott Manson | Matatū |
| | Tasman | Nelson*; Blenheim, Marlborough | Trafalgar Park; Lansdowne Park | 18,000; 15,000 | 2006 | Mel Bosman | Matatū |
| | Wellington | Wellington* | Sky Stadium | 34,500 | 1879 | Ross Bond | Hurricanes Poua |

Note: Taranaki has been removed from the main Farah Palmer Cup competition as they are instead playing in a Northern Regions Development Competition. Taranaki still have ties to the Chiefs Manawa Super Rugby Aupiki team.

1. * Denotes Town/City named the same as the region.

== Champions ==
=== Premiership ===
| Season | Winner | Score | Runner-up | Semi-finalist 1 | Semi-finalist 2 | League Leader |
|---|---|---|---|---|---|---|
| 2006 | Wellington | 11–10 | Auckland | Otago | Hawke's Bay | Otago |
| 2007 | Auckland | 13–12 | Otago | Wellington | Canterbury | Auckland |
| 2008 | Auckland | 13–12 | Canterbury | Hawke's Bay | Manawatu | Auckland |
| 2009 | Auckland | 24–20 | Canterbury | Hawke's Bay | Wellington | Canterbury |
| 2011 | Auckland | 34–8 | Wellington | | | Auckland |
| 2012 | Auckland | 38–12 | Canterbury | | | Auckland |
| 2013 | Auckland | 20–10 | Canterbury | | | Canterbury |
| 2014 | Auckland | 28–14 | Waikato | | | Auckland |
| 2015 | Auckland | 39–9 | Wellington | Waikato | Counties Manukau | Auckland |
| 2016 | Counties Manukau | 41–22 | Auckland | Wellington | Canterbury | Counties Manukau |
| 2017 | Canterbury | 13–7 | Counties Manukau | Waikato | Auckland | Counties Manukau |
| 2018 | Canterbury | 52–29 | Counties Manukau | Manawatu | Waikato | Canterbury |
| 2019 | Canterbury | 30–20 | Auckland | Wellington | Counties Manukau | Canterbury |
| 2020 | Canterbury | 8–7 | Waikato | Auckland | Manawatu | Waikato |
| 2021 | Waikato | 22–20 | Canterbury | Wellington | | Canterbury |
| 2022 | Canterbury | 41–14 | Auckland | Wellington | Waikato | Canterbury |
| 2023 | Auckland | 39-27 | Canterbury | Hawkes Bay | Waikato | Canterbury |
| 2024 | Waikato | 27-25 | Canterbury | Counties Manukau | Auckland | Waikato |
| 2025 | Waikato | 19-13 | Canterbury | Manawatū | Auckland | Waikato |

=== Championship ===
| Season | Winner | Score | Runner-up | Semi-finalist 1 | Semi-finalist 2 | League Leader |
|---|---|---|---|---|---|---|
| 2017 | Bay of Plenty | 7–5 | Otago | North Harbour | N/A | Bay of Plenty |
| 2018 | Wellington | 57–5 | Otago | Hawke's Bay | North Harbour | Wellington |
| 2019 | Otago | 24–20 | Hawke's Bay | Tasman | Northland | Otago |
| 2020 | – | | | | | |
| 2021 | Manawatū | 55–12 | Hawke's Bay | Northland | | Manawatū |
| 2022 | Hawke's Bay | 24–20 | Otago | Northland | North Harbour | Otago |
| 2023 | Northland | 32–29 | Manawatū | Tasman | Otago | Manawatū |
| 2024 | Manawatū | 33–3 | Otago | Wellington | North Harbour | Manawatū |
| 2025 | Otago | 37–12 | Northland | Wellington | North Harbour | Otago |

== Past Premierships ==
| Season | Winner | Runner-up |
|---|---|---|
| 1999 | Auckland | Wellington |
| 2000 | Auckland | Otago |
| 2001 | Auckland | Wellington |
| 2002 | Auckland | Wellington |
| 2003 | Auckland | Wellington |
| 2004 | Auckland | Canterbury |
| 2005 | Auckland | Canterbury |

== Total Wins ==
| Team | Premierships | Championships | Runners- Up | Losing Semi Finalists |
|---|---|---|---|---|
| Auckland | 16 | 0 | 4 | 2 |
| Canterbury | 5 | 0 | 10 | 2 |
| Wellington | 1 | 1 | 6 | 6 |
| Counties Manukau | 1 | 0 | 2 | 2 |
| Bay of Plenty | 0 | 1 | 0 | 0 |
| Otago | 0 | 2 | 6 | 1 |
| Hawke's Bay | 0 | 1 | 2 | 4 |
| Waikato | 3 | 0 | 2 | 3 |
| Manawatū | 0 | 2 | 1 | 3 |
| North Harbour | 0 | 0 | 0 | 3 |
| Tasman | 0 | 0 | 0 | 1 |
| Northland | 0 | 1 | 1 | 3 |
| Taranaki | 0 | 0 | 0 | 0 |
