= 2022 Farah Palmer Cup =

2022 Farah Palmer Cup season
- Countries: New Zealand
- Date: 16 July – 10 September 2022
- Champions: Canterbury
- Runners-up: Auckland

Official website
- www.provincial.rugby/farah-palmer-cup/

The 2022 Farah Palmer Cup season is the 16th season of the competition. The regular season ran from 16 July to 28 August, with the playoffs running from 3 to 10 September. Canterbury won their fifth title after defeating Auckland in the Premiership final and Hawke's Bay won their first Championship title after beating Otago 24–20 at the Clutha Showgrounds in Balclutha.

== Format ==
The Farah Palmer Cup standings are sorted by a competition points system. Four points are awarded to the winning team, a draw earns two points, whilst a loss amounts to zero points. Unions can also win their side a respectable bonus point. To receive a bonus point, they must score four tries or more, or lose by seven points or less. Each team is placed on their total points received. If a tiebreaker is necessary, when two or more teams finish on equal points, the union who acquired more competition points against the other tied team(s) gets placed higher. In the case that separation is still not made, the winner of the head-to-head result between the teams will get rights to be ranked above. This seeding format was only implemented for the 2020 competition.

The regular season consists of two types of matches. Each union play home or away games against each team from their division, making a total of six competition games during the regular season for each union in the North pool, and five regular season games for those in the South pool. The finals format sees the top two teams from each pool qualify for cross-over semi-finals. The top placed teams in each pool, based on table points, receive a home semi-final. In the first round of the finals, the semi-finals, the top placed North team is to host the second-placed South team, and the first-placed South team is to host the Second placed North team. The final is to be hosted by the top remaining seed.

== Standings ==
=== Premiership ===
#	Team	GP	W	D	L	PF	PA	PD	TB	LB	PTS
1	Canterbury	6	6	0	0	210	140	+70	6	0	30
2	Waikato	6	5	0	1	173	96	+77	3	1	24
3	Auckland	6	3	0	3	132	131	+1	4	2	18
4	Wellington	6	2	0	4	122	162	–40	3	2	13
5	Bay of Plenty	6	2	0	4	110	136	–26	2	2	12
6	Counties Manukau	6	2	0	4	126	159	–33	1	1	10
7	Manawatu	6	1	0	5	125	174	–49	2	1	7

=== Championship ===
#	Team	GP	W	D	L	PF	PA	PD	TB	LB	PTS
1	Otago	5	5	0	0	215	76	+139	5	0	25
2	Hawke's Bay	5	3	1	1	131	81	+50	3	0	17
3	Northland	5	3	0	2	112	119	–7	3	0	15
4	Tasman	5	2	1	2	86	100	–14	1	0	11
5	North Harbour	5	1	0	4	86	149	–63	1	1	5
6	Taranaki	5	0	0	5	72	177	–105	0	0	0

== Regular season ==
The 2021 Farah Palmer Cup was played across nine weeks. The competition started on Saturday, 16 July, with Wellington hosting a match against Canterbury.

=== Week 1 ===
16 July 2022	Wellington	5–43	Canterbury	Jerry Collins Stadium, Porirua

16 July 2022	Waikato	33–24	Manawatu	FMG Stadium Waikato, Hamilton

16 July 2022	Auckland	39–20	Counties Manukau	Western Springs Stadium, Auckland

Bye: Bay of Plenty, Championship Teams

=== Week 2 ===
23 July 2022	JJ – Canterbury	33–27	Auckland	Rugby Park, Christchurch
12:05 NZST

23 July 2022	Taranaki	10–21	North Harbour	New Plymouth Boys' High School, New Plymouth
12:35 NZST

23 July 2022	Hawke's Bay	22–44	Otago	Hawke's Bay Regional Sports Park, Hastings
14:05 NZST

23 July 2022	Northland	29–10	Tasman	Semenoff Stadium, Whangārei
16:35 NZST

24 July 2022	Manawatu	26–37	Bay of Plenty	Central Energy Trust Arena, Palmerston North
12:05 NZST

24 July 2022	Counties Manukau	19–27	Wellington	Navigation Homes Stadium, Pukekohe
14:05 NZST

Bye: Waikato

=== Week 3 ===
30 July 2022	Bay of Plenty	7–3	Auckland	Blake Park, Mount Maunganui
14:05 NZST

30 July 2022	Manawatu	13–19	Counties Manukau	Central Energy Trust Arena, Palmerston North
14:05 NZST

30 July 2022	Tasman	27–17	Taranaki	Trafalgar Park, Nelson
14:05 NZST

30 July 2022	Otago	39–10	Northland	Forsyth Barr Stadium, Dunedin

31 July 2022	North Harbour	5–32	Hawke's Bay	North Harbour Stadium, Albany
12:05 NZST

31 July 2022	Wellington	16–23	Waikato	Jerry Collins Stadium, Porirua
14:05 NZST

Bye: Canterbury

=== Week 4 ===
6 August 2022	Counties Manukau	31–36	Canterbury	Navigation Homes Stadium, Pukekohe
11:35 NZST

6 August 2022	Auckland	32–5	Manawatu	Eden Park, Auckland
14:05 NZST

6 August 2022	Waikato	17–10	Bay of Plenty	FMG Stadium Waikato, Hamilton
14:05 NZST

6 August 2022	Northland	17–32	Hawke's Bay	Semenoff Stadium, Whangārei
16:35 NZST

7 August 2022	Taranaki	15–55	Otago	New Plymouth Boys' High School, New Plymouth
11:35 NZST

7 August 2022	Tasman	42–15	North Harbour	Lansdowne Park, Blenheim
11:35 NZST

Bye: Wellington

=== Week 5 ===
13 August 2022	Otago	39–7	Tasman	Forsyth Barr Stadium, Dunedin
11:35 NZST

13 August 2022	Hawke's Bay	45–15	Taranaki	TBC
14:05 NZST

13 August 2022	Northland	27–23	North Harbour	Semenoff Stadium, Whangārei
14:05 NZST

13 August 2022	Manawatu	38–17	Wellington	Central Energy Trust Arena, Palmerston North
14:05 NZST

13 August 2022	JJ – Canterbury	29–27	Waikato	Orangetheory Stadium, Christchurch
16:35 NZST

14 August 2022	Bay of Plenty	12–25	Counties Manukau	Tauranga Domain, Tauranga
11:35 NZST

Bye: Auckland

=== Week 6 ===
20 August	Wellington	32–13	Bay of Plenty	Porirua Park

20 August	Taranaki	15–29	Northland	TET Stadium and Events Centre

20 August	North Harbour	22–38	Otago	North Harbour Stadium

20 August	JJ – Canterbury	36–19	Manawatu	Orangetheory Stadium

20 August	Waikato	41–5	Auckland	FMG Stadium Waikato

Bye: Counties Manukau; Tasman and Hawke's Bay game cancelled

=== Week 7 ===
27 August	Counties Manukau	12–32	Waikato	Navigation Homes Stadium

27 August	Auckland	26–25	Wellington	Eden Park

27 August	Tasman	20–31	North Harbour	Lansdowne Park

28 August	Bay of Plenty	31–33	Canterbury	Tauranga Domain

28 August	Northland	31–19	Taranaki	Northland Events Centre

Bye:

== Play-offs ==
Championship

Semi-finals
Hawke's Bay	28
Northland	19
Otago	42
North Harbour	17

Final
Hawke's Bay	24
Otago	20

Premiership

Semi-finals
Canterbury	31
Wellington	3
Auckland	26
Waikato	21

Final
Canterbury	41
Auckland	14

=== Semi-finals ===
Championship Semi-finals

3 September	Hawke's Bay	28–19	Northland	McLean Park

4 September	Otago	42–17	North Harbour	Forsyth Barr Stadium

Premiership Semi-finals

4 September	Canterbury	31–3	Wellington	Orangetheory Stadium

4 September	Auckland	26–21	Waikato	FMG Stadium Waikato

=== Finals ===
Championship Final

10 September	Otago	20–24	Hawke's Bay	Clutha Showgrounds, Balclutha

Premiership Final

10 September	Canterbury	41–14	Auckland	Rugby Park, Christchurch

== JJ Stewart Trophy ==
The JJ Stewart Trophy is a trophy based on a challenge system, rather than a league or knockout competition as with most football trophies. The holding union must defend the trophy in challenge matches, and if a challenger defeats them, they become the new holder of the trophy.

Canterbury started the season as holders of the trophy and as such, were obligated to place the trophy up for challenge in all of their regular season home games.

Successful JJ Stewart Trophy challenges were played by Canterbury in Round 3, Round 5 and Round 7 against Otago, Wellington and Tasman respectively.
