= 2023 Farah Palmer Cup =

2023 Farah Palmer Cup season
- Countries: New Zealand
- Date: 15 July – 9 September 2023
- Champions: Auckland
- Runners-up: Canterbury
- Promoted: Northland
- Relegated: Wellington
- Matches played: 41
- Top point scorer: Selica Winiata (84 points) (Manawatū)
- Top try scorer: Angelica Vahai (12 tries) (Auckland)

Official website
- www.provincial.rugby/farah-palmer-cup/

The 2023 Farah Palmer Cup season is the 17th season of the competition. The regular season ran from 15 July to 27 August, with the playoffs running from 2 to 9 September.

Auckland upset Canterbury to win the Premiership final, it was their first victory over Canterbury since 2017 and their first national title since 2015. Northland beat Manawatū to win their first title in the Championship final and were promoted to the Premiership for the 2024 season.

== Format ==
The Farah Palmer Cup standings are sorted by a competition points system. Four points are awarded to the winning team, a draw earns two points, whilst a loss amounts to zero points. Unions can also win their side a respectable bonus point. To receive a bonus point, they must score four tries or more, or lose by seven points or less. Each team is placed on their total points received. If a tiebreaker is necessary, when two or more teams finish on equal points, the union who acquired more competition points against the other tied team(s) gets placed higher. In the case that separation is still not made, the winner of the head-to-head result between the teams will get rights to be ranked above. This seeding format was only implemented for the 2020 competition.

The regular season consists of two types of matches. Each union play home or away games against each team from their division, making a total of six competition games during the regular season for each union in the Premiership pool, and five regular season games for those in the Championship pool.

== Standings ==
=== Premiership ===
Pos	Team	Pld	W	D	L	PF	PA	PD	TB	LB	Pts
1	Canterbury	6	5	0	1	268	123	+145	6	1	27
2	Waikato	6	5	0	1	150	93	+57	3	0	23
3	Auckland	6	4	0	2	195	118	+77	3	2	21
4	Hawke's Bay	6	3	0	3	150	242	−92	4	1	17
5	Counties Manukau	6	3	0	3	199	134	+65	3	0	15
6	Bay of Plenty	6	1	0	5	101	246	−145	2	1	7
7	Wellington	6	0	0	6	122	229	−107	2	2	4

=== Championship ===
Pos	Team	Pld	W	D	L	PF	PA	PD	TB	LB	Pts
1	Manawatū	5	5	0	0	252	78	+174	5	0	25
2	Northland	5	4	0	1	192	67	+125	5	1	22
3	Otago	5	3	0	2	159	113	+46	4	1	17
4	Tasman	5	2	0	3	135	142	−7	3	1	12
5	Taranaki	5	1	0	4	41	272	−231	1	0	5
6	North Harbour	5	0	0	5	68	175	−107	0	1	1

== Regular season ==
=== Week 1 ===
15 July 2022	Hawke's Bay	32–31	Auckland	Hawke's Bay Regional Sports Park, Hasting
12:05pm	Try: Khalia Awa 21'; Denise Aiolupotea 25'; Teilah Ferguson 42'; Leah Tuhi 54'; Con: Krysten Cottrell (3/4) 22', 43', 55'; Pen: Krysten Cottrell (2/2) 40', 70'		Try: M.Puckett 28'; Princess Elliot 31'; A. Vahai 34'; M. Kataoka 68'; Cheyenne Tuli 73'; Con: F. Bloomfield (1/3) 29'; Sophie Fisher (2/2) 68', 73'; Pen: Sophie Fisher(0/1); Cards: Cristo Tofa (yellow card) 16' to 26'

15 July 2022	Canterbury	58–29	Wellington	Rugby Park, Christchurch
12:05pm	Try: K. Wright-Akeli 12', 43'; Winnie Palamo 15'; Martha Mataele 29'; Marcelle Parkes 37', 40'; Hayley Hutana 48'; Atlanta Lolohea 52', 57'; K. Simpson 80'; Con: Isabella Waterman (0/3); Hayley Hutana(4/7) 38', 40', 53', 58'		Try: J. McGregor 9', 22'; S. Filipo 18'; A. Schwencke 61'; Con: A. Landon-Lane(2/3) 10', 23'; T. Ruaporo (0/2); Cards: A. Schwencke (yellow card) 36' to 46'

15 July 2022	Bay of Plenty	0–50	Waikato	Rotorua International Stadium, Rotorua
2:05pm	Try: M. Paraone 31', 61'; C. Wilson-Jenkins 40', 74'; C. Hohepa 51'; G. Houpapa-Barrett 70'; L. Ieremia 77'; Con: S. Wood(1/2) 40'; S. Bayler (2/4) 62', 72'; Pen: S. Wood(3/3) 15', 15', 23'

Bye: Counties Manukau, Championship Teams

=== Week 2 ===
22 July 2023	Waikato	27–24	Canterbury	St. Paul's Collegiate, Hamilton
2:05pm	Try: C. Wilson-Jenkins 17'; V. Makea 40', 80'; M. Anderson 43'; Con: S. Bayler (1/3) 44'; S. Wood(1/1) 82'; Pen: S. Wood(1/1) 85'		Try: K. Wright-Akeli 11', 62'; L. Bayfield 26'; Martha Mataele 57'; Con: Isabella Waterman (2/4) 12', 58'

22 July 2023	Counties Manukau	51–5	Bay of Plenty	Navigation Homes Stadium, Pukekohe
2:05pm	Try: J. Kolose 10', 50', 72'; S. To'a 17', 28'; C. Leuta 23', 40'; K. Enosa-Taifau 46'; L. Samuelu 80'; Con: S. To'a (3/6) 17', 24', 51'; V. Subritzky-Nafatali(0/2)		Try: S. Williams 75'; Con: K. Raki (0/1)

22 July 2023	Tasman	28–34	Otago	St. Paul's Collegiate, Hamilton
7:05pm	Try: A. Ulutupu 15'; C. Dixon 39'; F. Solomona 55'; S. Pauaraisa 61'; Con: C. Siataga (1/4) 62'; Pen: C. Siataga (2/2) 32', 76'		Try: K. Wright-Akeli 11', 62'; L. Bayfield 26'; Martha Mataele 57'; Con: Isabella Waterman (2/4) 12', 58'

Bye: Hawke's Bay, Championship Teams

=== Week 3 ===
29 July 2023	Canterbury	42–12	Bay of Plenty	Christchurch Rugby Park

29 July 2023	Tasman	26–21	North Harbour	Trafalgar Park

29 July 2023	Hawke's Bay	10–14	Waikato	Hawke's Bay Regional Sports Park

29 July 2023	Otago	41–0	Taranaki	Whitestone Contracting Stadium

29 July 2023	Manawatū	34–28	Northland	Central Energy Trust Arena

30 July 2023	Wellington	20–53	Counties Manukau	Hutt Recreation Ground

Bye: Auckland

=== Week 4 ===
4 August 2023	Taranaki	10–61	Tasman	Yarrow Stadium

5 August 2023	Auckland	61–19	Bay of Plenty	Colin Maiden Park

5 August 2023	Waikato	13–5	Counties Manukau	St Paul's Collegiate

5 August 2023	Northland	42–20	Otago	Northland Events Centre

6 August 2023	North Harbour	9–57	Manawatū	Windsor Park

6 August 2023	Wellington	22–33	Hawke's Bay	Hutt Recreation Ground

Bye: Canterbury

=== Week 5 ===
11 August 2023	Counties Manukau	10–37	Auckland	Navigation Homes Stadium

12 August 2023	Bay of Plenty	37–7	Wellington	Tauranga Domain

12 August 2023	Northland	67–0	Taranaki	Kaikohe RFC

12 August 2023	Hawke's Bay	14–84	Canterbury	Hawke's Bay Regional Sports Park

12 August 2023	Otago	37–12	North Harbour	Forsyth Barr Stadium

13 August 2023	Manawatū	46–14	Tasman	Central Energy Trust Arena

Bye: Waikato

=== Week 6 ===
19 August 2023	North Harbour	19–31	Taranaki	Onewa Domain

19 August 2023	Canterbury	33–17	Counties Manukau	Apollo Projects Stadium

19 August 2023	Otago	27–31	Manawatū	University of Otago Oval

19 August 2023	Tasman	6–31	Northland	Lansdowne Park

20 August 2023	Bay of Plenty	28–35	Hawke's Bay	Whakatane Rugby Park

20 August 2023	Auckland	25–15	Waikato	Colin Maiden Park

Bye: Wellington

=== Week 7 ===
26 August 2023	Auckland	24–27	Canterbury	Eden Park

26 August 2023	Counties Manukau	63–26	Hawke's Bay	Navigation Homes Stadium

26 August 2023	Otago	39–13	North Harbour	Forsyth Barr Stadium

27 August 2023	Waikato	31–29	Wellington	FMG Stadium Waikato

27 August 2023	Tasman	45–20	Taranaki	Trafalgar Park

Bye: Bay of Plenty

== Play-offs ==
Premiership

Semi-finals
Waikato	22
Auckland	29
Canterbury	59
Hawke's Bay	29

Final
Canterbury	27
Auckland	39

Championship

Semi-finals
Manawatū	73
Tasman	10
Northland	29
Otago	19

Final
Manawatū	29
Northland	32

=== Semi-finals ===
Premiership Semi-finals

2 September	Waikato	22–29	Auckland	FMG Stadium Waikato

3 September	Canterbury	59–29	Hawke's Bay	Christchurch Rugby Park

Championship Semi-finals

2 September	Manawatu	73–10	Tasman	Central Energy Trust Arena

2 September	Northland	29–19	Otago	Northland Events Centre

=== Finals ===
Premiership Final

9 September	Canterbury	27–39	Auckland	Christchurch Rugby Park

Championship Final

10 September	Manawatu	29–32	Northland	Central Energy Trust Arena

== JJ Stewart Trophy ==
The JJ Stewart Trophy is a trophy based on a challenge system, rather than a league or knockout competition as with most football trophies. The holding union must defend the trophy in challenge matches, and if a challenger defeats them, they become the new holder of the trophy.

Canterbury started the season as holders of the trophy and as such, were obligated to place the trophy up for challenge in all of their regular season home games.
