= Ben Botica =

NZ rugby union player

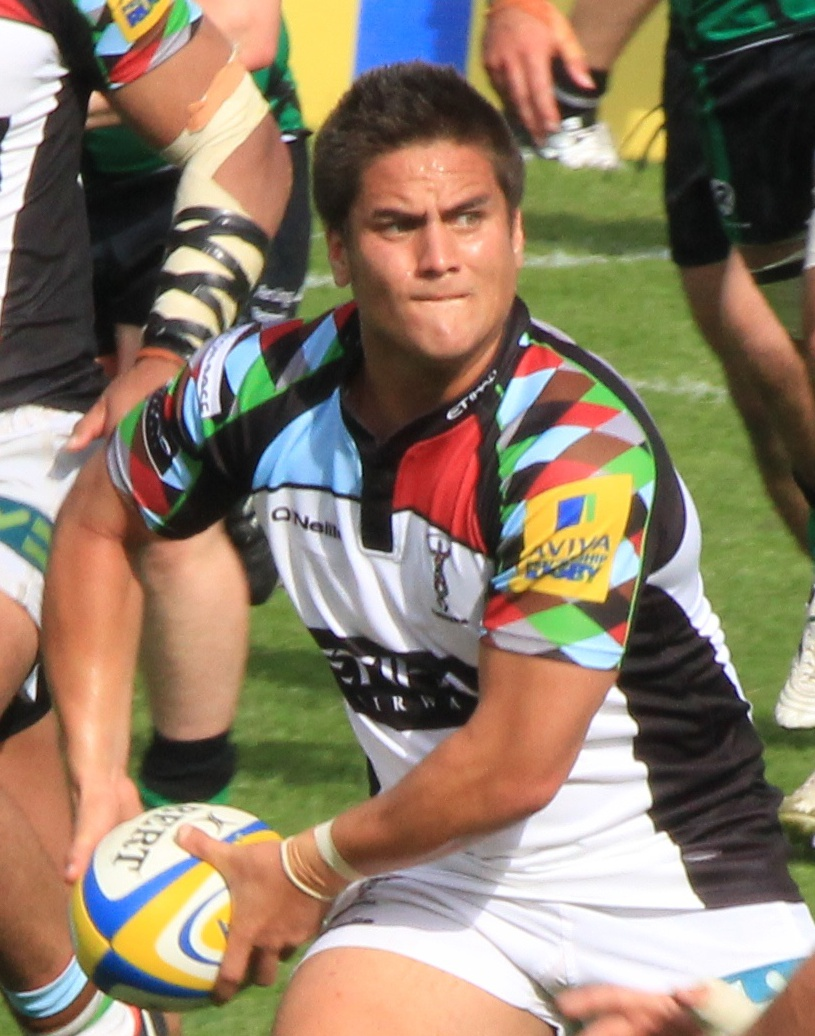
- Born: Benjamin Botica; 7 October 1989 (age 37) Takapuna, New Zealand
- Height: 180 cm (5 ft 11 in)
- Weight: 85 kg (13 st 5 lb)
- Notable relatives: Frano Botica (Father); Jacob Botica (Brother)
- Occupation: Rugby union player

Rugby union career
- Position(s): Fly-Half, Centre
Amateur team(s)
Years	Team	Apps	(Points)
- North Shore Rugby Club
Senior career
Years	Team	Apps	(Points)
2011–2012	Périgueux	18	(208)
2012–2016	Harlequins	95	(551)
2016	Montpellier	9	(65)
2017–2019	Oyonnax	50	(687)
2019–2021	Bordeaux Bègles	17	(106)
2021–2023	Castres	0	(0)
2023-	Soyaux Angoulême		
- Correct as of 6 December 2019
Provincial / State sides
Years	Team	Apps	(Points)
2009–2012	North Harbour	17	(168)

Ben Botica (born 7 October 1989, Takapuna) is a New Zealand rugby union player. A fly-half or centre, he plays for French club Soyaux Angoulême XV Charente.

The son of the New Zealand international Frano Botica, he played rugby at school and was selected to play for the New Zealand Schoolboys team. In 2008, he spent a year in France where he played with the Espoirs (Academy) team of Biarritz Olympique.

He then returned to New Zealand where he joined North Harbour. He played his first professional match in August 2009 against Southland in the Air New Zealand Cup. In 2011, he narrowly missed out on selection for the Auckland Blues franchise and the chance to play in Super Rugby. He returned to France where he played the 2011-2012 Pro D2 season with CA Périgueux.

Late in the season, it was announced that he had signed a two-year contract with Harlequins although he actually signed in October 2011. As a British passport holder, he did not count as a foreign player. In his initial season with Harlequins, he was the top points scorer (with 78) in the LV Cup.

In his final game at Harlequins, the 2016 European Challenge Cup Final, Botica came on as a replacement to face the club he was about to join. With time nearly up and Quins trailing by 7 points he kicked the ball to Montpellier who put it into touch to end the game. Most had expected him to keep the ball live and mount one final attack to attempt to level the scores and take it to extra time. It was Head Coach Conor O'Shea's last game for the club.

Botica joined Montpellier in 2016 and moved to Oyonnax in 2017.

On 16 November 2020, Botica would sign for French rivals Castres on a two-year deal from the 2021–22 season.
