= North Harbour Rugby Premier 1 =

- Sport: Rugby Union
- Founded: 1985; 41 years ago
- Owner: North Harbour Rugby Union
- No. of teams: 9
- Country: New Zealand
- Most recent champion: Massey (2026, 7th title)
- Most titles: Takapuna (13 titles)
- Sponsor: Kennards Hire
- Related competitions: Auckland Rugby Union; Gallaher Shield
- Website: Harbour Rugby

The North Harbour Rugby Union club rugby title has been contested since the formation of the North Harbour Rugby Union in New Zealand in 1985. The current trophy awarded to the winner is the ASB Bank Cup. The Premier Grade championship cup has also been named the New Zealand Couriers Cup The current champions are North Shore RFC. The Reserve Grade Championship Cup is named the "Stuart Cup" after North Shore Rugby Club stalwart Jim Stuart who donated the Cup to the North Harbour Rugby Union in 1985. From 1985 to 1996 Harbour club finals were contested at Onewa Domain. From 1997 to 2022 all Club finals were held at North Harbour Stadium, and since 2023 all Club finals were held at the higher-ranked clubs’ home grounds. Club finals are usually held in July.

East Coast Bays won the inaugural title in 1985. The most successful team in the competitions history is Takapuna, the current champions, who have won the title 13 times including 7 straight titles from 1994 to 2000 and 4 titles from 2006 to 2009. North Shore have won the title 10 times, with Massey winning 6 titles, and with Northcote winning 5. Takapuna RFC and North Shore RFC are the 2 only Harbour clubs that have won an Auckland RFU Premiership, Shore in 1899 and Takapuna in 1940 and 1980. Takapuna is the only club of the 2 that has been awarded the Gallaher Shield.

As of 2025, Glenfield RFC, North Harbour Marist RFC, Mahurangi RFC and Kumeu RFC are yet to win a Premiership. In 2012 a combined Kumeu and Helensville team called the Western Pioneers won a premiership when they defeated Silverdale at North Harbour Stadium. Both clubs went their separate ways in 2015.

As of 2025, some teams that previously played in the premier one grade - such as Royal Navy RFC, Glenfield RFC, and Marist North Harbour RFC - no longer have teams in the grade. Most clubs, with the exclusion of the latter, field teams in the premier 2 competition instead.

Only three clubs across the grades have won over ten Championships. Takapuna Premiers with 13 Premierships, North Shore Senior Reserves with 13 Reserve Grade championships and Takapuna Under 21s with 10 Under 21 Championships.

Jointly, between most North Harbour clubs, there is a premier women's team - entered in the wider Auckland women's grade - the Albany Barbarians.

== Current clubs ==
As of the 2025 season.

Team	Location	Home ground	2025 season
East Coast Bays	Windsor Park, Auckland	Windsor Park	5th
Helensville	Helensville	Rautawhiri Reserve	8th
Kumeu	Riverhead	Riverhead War Memorial Park	9th
Mahurangi	Warkworth	Warkworth Showgrounds	6th
Massey	Massey, Auckland	Moire Park	3rd
Northcote	Birkenhead, Auckland	Birkenhead War Memorial Park	4th
North Shore	Devonport, Auckland	Vauxhall Sports Field	1st (champions)
Silverdale	Silverdale	Silverdale War Memorial Park	7th
Takapuna	Northcote, Auckland	Onewa Domain	2nd

== North Harbour Secondary Schools 1st XV Rugby ==
Since 1985 the North Harbour secondary schools rugby competition has been run during the winter rugby season. The most successful school in this competition is Westlake Boys' High School who has won 17 championships since 1988. Westlake's closest rival is Rosmini College with 8 championships. Takapuna Grammar is the only school in this competition that won an Auckland Secondary schools 1st XV competition when they shared a championship with Auckland Grammar in 1941.

The biggest rivalry in the competition is between Westlake Boys' High School and Rosmini College. Westlake Boys' High School is an all-boys state school located in the suburb of Forrest Hill, whilst Rosmini College is a state integrated catholic boys' school located slightly south in the suburb of Takapuna. The schools are located less than 2.1 km apart. The first known game between Westlake Boys and Rosmini took place in 1980 with Rosmini winning that day 18 points to 7.

In recent seasons Manurewa High School (from Counties Manukau) and Whangarei Boys High school (from Northland) have joined the NHSS 1st XV competition. Whangarei Boys High School made the final for the first time in 2019 and lost to Westlake Boys'.

The Woodhouse Shield is the NHSS rugby equivalent of the Ranfurly shield. The current holder of the shield is Westlake Boys' High School.

The eight schools that currently compete in the NHSS 1st XV competition, and their number of championship wins, are:

Westlake BHS (20), Rosmini College (8), Massey High School (6), Rangitoto College (2), Takapuna Grammar (2), Mahurangi College (0), Whangarei BHS (0), Orewa College (0).

As of 2025, the following Colleges/High Schools - now compete in the NHSS 1B competition alongside 2nd XV teams from Mahurangi, Massey, Orewa, Rangitoto, Rosmini and Westlake Boys': Birkenhead, Glenfield, Kaipara, Long Bay, Northcote, Vanguard, Whangaparaoa

The girls' equivalent to 1st XV secondary school rugby is the 12-a-side Youth 17 competition.

== North Harbour Club Rugby Titles and Runners-up ==
Team	Winner	Runner up
Takapuna	13	13
North Shore	10	11
Massey	7	1
Northcote	5	3
East Coast Bays	4	6
Silverdale	1	3
Western Pioneers	1	0
Glenfield	0	2
Helensville	0	1
Marist	0	1
Kumeu	0	0
Mahurangi	0	0
Navy	0	0

== North Harbour Club Rugby Finals ==
Year	Winner	Score	Runner up	Venue
1985	East Coast Bays (1)	9–3	North Shore	Onewa Domain Winning coach – Brad Meurant Winning captain- Mark Anscombe
1986	East Coast Bays (2)	16–6	Takapuna	Onewa Domain Winning coach – Brad Meurant Winning captain- Mark Anscombe
1987	North Shore (1)	24–12	East Coast Bays	Onewa Domain Winning coach – Brad Johnstone Winning captain- Russell Jones
1988	North Shore (2)	14–9	East Coast Bays	Onewa Domain Winning coach – Wayne Underhay Winning captain- Russell Jones
1989	Northcote (1)	16–6	East Coast Bays	Onewa Domain Winning coach – Brad Meurant Winning captain- Craig Burgess
1990	Northcote (2)	22–12	North Shore	Onewa Domain Winning coach – Brad Meurant Winning captain- Craig Burgess
1991	East Coast Bays (3)	27–12	Takapuna	Onewa Domain Winning coach – Mark Anscombe Winning captain- David Thomas
1992	North Shore (3)	40–6	Takapuna	Onewa Domain Winning coach – Brad Johnstone Winning captain- Russell Jones
1993	Massey (1)	25–19	East Coast Bays	Onewa Domain Winning coach – John Smith Winning captain-Neil Gibson
1994	Takapuna (1)	19–14	East Coast Bays	Onewa Domain Winning coach – Wayne Pivac Winning captain- Paul Feeney
1995	Takapuna (2)	46–6	Northcote	Onewa Domain Winning coach – Paul Feeney Winning captain -Milan Yelavich
1996	Takapuna (3)	29–8	Helensville	Onewa Domain Winning coach – Paul Feeney Winning captain- Robert Rush
1997	Takapuna (4)	31–10	North Shore	North Harbour Stadium Winning coach – Milan Yelavich Winning captain- Scott Palmer
1998	Takapuna (5)	22–17	North Shore	North Harbour Stadium Winning coach – Milan Yelavich Winning captain- Clayton Moors
1999	Takapuna (6)	41–16	Silverdale	North Harbour Stadium Winning coach – Milan Yelavich Winning captain- Clayton Moors
2000	Takapuna (7)	25–13	Glenfield	North Harbour Stadium Winning coach – Paul Feeney Winning captain- Clayton Moors
2001	North Shore (4)	23–12	Takapuna	North Harbour Stadium Winning coach – Grant Simpkins Winning captain- Phillip Weedon
2002	Takapuna (8)	21–0	North Shore	North Harbour Stadium Winning coach – Clayton Moors Winning captain- Gavin George
2003	Silverdale (1)	25–23	North Shore	North Harbour Stadium Winning coach – Charlie McAllister Winning captain- Duane Dalton
2004	Massey (2)	39–29	Takapuna	North Harbour Stadium Winning coach – Graham Lowe Winning captain- Steve Jackson
2005	Massey (3)	29–14	Takapuna	North Harbour Stadium Winning coach – Graham Lowe Winning captain- Steve Jackson
2006	Takapuna (9)	27–6	Glenfield	North Harbour Stadium Winning coach – Blair Larsen Winning captain- Simon Hanlon
2007	Takapuna (10)	28–23	Marist	North Harbour Stadium Winning coach – Alex O'Dowd Winning captain- Simon Hanlon
2008	Takapuna (11)	30–12	North Shore	North Harbour Stadium Winning coach – Alex O'Dowd Winning captain- Simon Hanlon
2009	Takapuna (12)	20–13	Northcote	North Harbour Stadium Winning coach – Blair Urlich Winning captain-Simon Hanlon
2010	Northcote (3)	28–18	North Shore	North Harbour Stadium Winning coach – Ian Selwyn Winning captain- Richard Mayhew
2011	North Shore (5)	17–16	Silverdale	North Harbour Stadium Winning coach – Wayne Shelford Winning captain- James Hinchco
2012	Western Pioneers (1)	21–15	Silverdale	North Harbour Stadium Winning coach – Stu Hollier Winning captain- Taione Vae
2013	Massey (4)	39–33	North Shore	North Harbour Stadium Winning coach – Brent Semmons Winning captain- Ben Svensen
2014	North Shore (6)	50–18	Massey	North Harbour Stadium Winning coach – Frano Botica Winning captain- Josh Blucher
2015	Massey (5)	31–26	North Shore	North Harbour Stadium Winning coach – Jarrod Framhein Winning captain- Ben Svensen
2016	Massey (6)	26–23 (GP)	Takapuna	North Harbour Stadium Winning Coach – Jarrod Framhein Winning captain- Ben Svensen
2017	Northcote (4)	17–14	Takapuna	North Harbour Stadium Winning Coach – Brett Bedwell/Brett Craies Winning captain-Ryan Thompson
2018	Northcote (5)	25–20	East Coast Bays	North Harbour Stadium Winning Coach – Brett Bedwell/Brett Craies Winning captain-Ryan Thompson
2019	East Coast Bays (4)	21–17	Northcote	North Harbour Stadium Winning Coach – John Scott Winning captain- Lewis Gjaltema
2020	N/A			Season abandoned due to COVID-19
2021	North Shore (7)	12-11	Takapuna	North Harbour Stadium Winning Coach – Frano Botica Winning captain- Alex Woonton
2022	Takapuna (13)	26-19	North Shore	
2023	North Shore (8)	26-10	Takapuna	Devonport Domain
2024	North Shore (9)	20-15	Takapuna	Devonport Domain
2025	North Shore (10)	33-15	Takapuna	Devonport Domain Winning coach — James Hinchco Winning captain — Donald Coleman
2026	Massey (7)	18-16	Takapuna	Moire Park

- GP signifies that the game went to Golden Point. Massey won the title in 2016 with a drop goal after the scores were tied 23–23 at the end of 80 minutes.

Senior Reserves/Senior B/ The Stuart Cup

1985 East Coast Bays(1)-Runners up Northcote

1986 North Shore (1)-Runners up East Coast Bays

1987 North Shore (2) -Runners up East Coast Bays

1988 East Coast Bays (2)-Runners up North Shore

1989 North Shore (3)-Runners up Northcote

1990 East Coast Bays(3)Runners up

1991 East Coast Bays(4)-Runners up Takapuna

1992 East Coast Bays(5)-Runners up Takapuna

1993 East Coast Bays(6)-Runners up Massey

1994 Takapuna(1)-Runners up Massey

1995 Massey(1)-Runners up Takapuna

1996 Massey(2)-Runners up Takapuna

1997 Takapuna(2)-Runners up Glenfield

1998 North Shore(4)-Runners up Takapuna

1999 Takapuna(3)-Runners up Northcote

2000 North Shore(5)-Runners up East Coast Bays

2001 East Coast Bays(7)-Runners up North Shore

2002 North Shore(6)-Runners up East Coast Bays

2003 Massey(3)-Runners up North Shore

2004 Massey(4)-Runners up Silverdale

2005 Massey(5)-Runners up Northcote

2006 North Shore(7)-Runners up Massey

2007 Northcote(1)-Runners up North Shore

2008 North Shore(8)-Runners up Northcote

2009 Marist(1)-Runners up East Coast Bays

2010 North Shore(9)-Runners up Massey

2011 Silverdale(1)-Runners up Northcote

2012 North Shore(10)-Runners up East Coast Bays

2013 Northcote (2)-Runners up North Shore

2014 North Shore(11)-Runners up Northcote

2015 Northcote(3)-Runners up North Shore

2016 North Shore(12)-Runners up Northcote

2017 Northcote(4)-Runners up Kumeu

2018 Northcote(5)-Runners up East Coast Bays

2019 North Shore (13)-Runners up East Coast Bays

2020 Season abandoned due to COVID-19

2021 Northcote (6)-Runners up Takapuna

2022. Northcote (7) -runners up North Shore

2023. North Shore (14) -runners up Takapuna

2024. Massey (6) - Runners up Silverdale

2025 Takapuna (4) —Runners up North Shore

Under 21 Championships

1985 Takapuna (1)

1986 Takapuna (2)

1987 Glenfield(1)

1988 East Coast Bays(1)

1989 East Coast Bays(2)

1990 East Coast Bays(3)

1991 Takapuna (3)

1992 East Coast Bays(4)

1993 Massey(1)

1994 North Shore (1)

1995 Takapuna (4)

1996 Takapuna (5)

1997 Takapuna (6)

1998 North Shore(2)

1999 Takapuna (7)

2000 Marist (1)

2001 Takapuna (8)

2002 Northcote (1)

2003 Northcote (2)

2004 Silverdale (1)

2005 Northcote (3)

2006 Takapuna (9)

2007 Massey (2)

2008 Glenfield(2)

2009 North Shore(3)

2010 North Shore(4)

2011 Silverdale (2)

2012 Takapuna(10)

2013 Northcote (4)

2014 Kumeu (1)

2015 Northcote (5)

2016 Kumeu (2)

2017 East Coast Bays (5)

2018 East Coast Bays (6)

2019 East Coast Bays (7)

2020 Season abandoned due to COVID-19

2021 East Coast Bays (8)

2022 East Coast Bays (9)

2023 Massey Rugby Football club(3)

2024 North Shore (5)

2025 North Shore (6)

2026 North Shore (7)

North Harbour Secondary schools Rugby First XV

1985 Birkenhead College (1)

1986 Hato Petera College (1)

1987 Rosmini College(1)

1988 Westlake Boys High School (1)

1989 Westlake Boys High School (2)

1990 Rangitoto College (1)

1991 Rangitoto College (2)

1992 Massey High School (1)

1993 Rosmini College (2)

1994 Rosmini College (3)

1995 Westlake Boys High School (3)

1996 Westlake Boys High School (4)

1997 Westlake Boys High School (5)

1998 Westlake Boys High School (6)

1999 Massey High School (2)

2000 Westlake Boys High School (7)

2001 Rosmini College (4)

2002 Massey High School (3)

2003 Rosmini College (5)

2004 Massey High School (4)

2005 Westlake Boys High School (8)

2006 Westlake Boys High School (9)

2007 Massey High School (5)/Takapuna Grammar (1)(shared)

2008 Westlake Boys High School (10)

2009 Rosmini College (6)

2010 Westlake Boys High School (11)

2011 Massey High School (6)

2012 Westlake Boys High School (12)

2013 Westlake Boys High School (13)

2014 Westlake Boys High School (14)

2015 Rosmini College (7)

2016 Westlake Boys High School (15)

2017 Rosmini College (8)

2018 Westlake Boys High School (16)/Takapuna Grammar (2) shared

2019 Westlake Boys High School (17)

2020 Season abandoned due to COVID-19

2021 Season abandoned due to COVID-19

2022 Westlake Boys High School (18)

2023 Westlake Boys High School (19)

2024 Westlake Boys High School (20)

2025 Westlake Boys High School (21)
