= 2019–20 Celtic Cup =

- Countries: Ireland; Wales
- Date: 23 August – 13 October 2019
- Champions: Leinster A (2nd title)
- Runners-up: Ulster A
- Matches played: 29

The 2019–20 Celtic Cup was the second edition of the Celtic Cup rugby union competition, which features development regional and provincial teams from Ireland and Wales. It ran from August 2019 until October 2019, with a change to a single table format from the original conference system.

Leinster A, winners of the inaugural edition, defended their title by beating first time finalists Ulster A in an all-Ireland final 31–10.

== Formation and purpose ==
The Irish Rugby Football Union and the Welsh Rugby Union created a new development competition, the Celtic Cup, for the emerging professional players from the four Irish provinces and four Welsh regions, announcing the tournament in August 2018.

The tournament, which features development squads from Pro14 teams Connacht, Leinster, Munster, Ulster, Cardiff Blues, Dragons, Ospreys and Scarlets, aims to provide a learning environment for development players, coaches and referees by recreating the week-to-week challenges presented by senior professional rugby.

== 2019–20 season ==
In a change from the 2018–19 tournament, the 2019–20 edition of the competition featured all eight teams in a single round-robin league format, rather than two conferences. Each team playing seven matches and the top two teams advanced to the final.

== Table ==
	Team	P	W	D	L	PF	PA	PD	TF	TA	TB	LB	Pts
1	(Ireland) Leinster A (CH)	7	7	0	0	351	140	211	55	22	7	0	35
2	(Ireland) Ulster A (RU)	7	5	0	2	198	170	28	28	23	5	0	25
3	(Ireland) Connacht Eagles	7	5	0	2	191	169	22	24	24	3	0	23
4	(Wales) Scarlets A	7	4	0	3	217	194	23	29	28	4	2	22
5	(Wales) Dragons A	7	2	0	5	205	236	-31	30	34	5	2	15
6	(Ireland) Munster A	7	2	1	4	165	206	-41	22	31	3	0	13
7	(Wales) Ospreys Development	7	1	1	5	133	229	-96	19	32	2	0	8
8	(Wales) Cardiff Blues A	7	1	0	6	109	225	-116	17	30	2	1	7
If teams are level at any stage, tiebreakers are applied in the following order -: 1. number of matches won 2. the difference between points for and points against 3. the number of tries scored 4. the most points scored 5. the difference between tries for and tries against 6. the fewest red cards received 7. the fewest yellow cards received
Green background indicates teams that advance to the final (Q) Qualified for the final (CH) Champions (RU) Runners-up; Updated: 5 October 2019; Source: Munster Rugby

== Pool Stage ==
=== Round 1 ===
24 August 2019
14:30

(1 BP) Cardiff Blues A (Wales)	28–47	(Ireland) Leinster A (1 BP)
	Report

Cardiff Arms Park
Referee: Mike English (WRU)

23 August 2019
19:30

Munster A (Ireland)	20–20	(Wales) Ospreys Development
	Report

Irish Independent Park
Attendance: 200
Referee: Chris Busby (IRFU)

24 August 2019
14:30

(2 BP) Scarlets A (Wales)	32–35	(Ireland) Ulster A (1 BP)
	Report

Church Bank Playing Fields

23 August 2019
14:00

Connacht Eagles (Ireland)	24–19	(Wales) Dragons A (1 BP)
	Report

The Sportsground

=== Round 2 ===
31 August 2019
17:30

(1 BP) Leinster A (Ireland)	50–12	(Wales) Scarlets A
	Report

Energia Park

30 August 2019
19:00

(1 BP) Dragons A (Wales)	36–10	(Ireland) Munster A
	Report

Rodney Parade

31 August 2019
19:30

(1 BP) Ulster A (Ireland)	32–5	(Wales) Cardiff A
	Report

Gibson Park

31 August 2019
12:00

Ospreys Development (Wales)	19–40	(Ireland) Connacht Eagles (1 BP)
	Report

Brewery Field

=== Round 3 ===
6 September 2019
19:30

Munster A (Ireland)	21–47	(Ireland) Leinster A (1 BP)
	Report

Irish Independent Park
Attendance: 200
Referee: Jonny Erskine (IRFU)

6 September 2019
16:00

(1 BP) Ulster A (Ireland)	33–13	(Ireland) Connacht Eagles
	Report

Eaton Park
Referee: Stuart Gaffikin (IRFU)

7 September 2019
14:30

(1 BP) Scarlets A (Wales)	55–14	(Wales) Ospreys Development
	Report

Parc y Scarlets

7 September 2019
15:30

(1 BP) Cardiff Blues A (Wales)	40–31	(Wales) Dragons A (1 BP)
	Report

Cardiff Arms Park

=== Round 4 ===
14 September 2019
13:00

(1 BP) Connacht Eagles (Ireland)	38–27	(Ireland) Munster A
	Report

The Sportsground
Referee: Chris Busby (IRFU)

14 September 2019
15:00

(1 BP) Leinster A (Ireland)	55–24	(Ireland) Ulster A (1 BP)
	Report

Energia Park
Referee: Robert O'Sullivan (IRFU)

13 September 2019
19:15

Ospreys Development (Wales)	29–5	(Wales) Cardiff Blues A
	Report

Brewery Field

14 September 2019

(2 BP) Dragons A (Wales)	35–40	(Wales) Scarlets A (1 BP)
	Report

Rodney Parade

=== Round 5 ===
20 September 2019
19:15

(1 BP) Ospreys Development (Wales)	24–54	(Ireland) Leinster A (1 BP)
	Report

St. Helen's
Referee: Ben Whitehouse (WRU)

20 September 2019
18:00

(1 BP) Munster A (Ireland)	28–7	(Wales) Cardiff Blues A
	Report

Irish Independent Park

21 September 2019
15:00

(1 BP) Dragons A (Wales)	31–43	(Ireland) Ulster A (1 BP)
	Report

CCB Centre

20 September 2019
19:00

Connacht Eagles (Ireland)	20–16	(Wales) Scarlets A (1 BP)
	Report

Corinthian Park

=== Round 6 ===
28 September 2019
15:00

(1 BP) Leinster A (Ireland)	55–17	(Wales) Dragons A
	Report

Energia Park

28 September 2019
13:00

(1 BP) Scarlets A (Wales)	46–28	(Ireland) Munster A (1 BP)
	Report

Carmarthen Park
Referee: Elgan Williams (WRU)

27 September 2019
17:00

Ulster A (Ireland)	19–3	(Wales) Ospreys Development
	Report

Gibson Park

28 September 2019
14:30

Cardiff Blues A (Wales)	12–42	(Ireland) Connacht Eagles (1 BP)
	Report

Cardiff Arms Park

=== Round 7 ===
4 October 2019
13:00

Connacht Eagles (Ireland)	14–43	(Ireland) Leinster A (1 BP)
	Report

The Sportsground

4 October 2019
17:00

Ulster A (Ireland)	12–31	(Ireland) Munster A (1 BP)
	Report

Shaw's Bridge
Referee: Peter Martin (IRFU)

4 October 2019
19:15

(1 BP) Cardiff Blues A (Wales)	12–16	(Wales) Scarlets A
	Report

Cardiff Arms Park
Referee: Mike English (WRU)

5 October 2019
15:00

(1 BP) Dragons A (Wales)	36–24	(Wales) Ospreys Development (1 BP)
	Report

CCB Centre

== Final ==
13 October 2019
15:00

Leinster A (Ireland)	31–10	(Ireland) Ulster A
	Report

Energia Park
Referee: Robert O'Sullivan (IRFU)
