= Ron Williams (rugby union) =

New Zealand rugby union player (born 1963)

- Born: Ronald Oscar Williams; 20 July 1963 (age 63) Suva, Fiji
- Height: 1.87 m (6 ft 2 in)
- Weight: 105 kg (231 lb)
- School: Westlake Boys' High School

Rugby union career
- Position: Prop
Provincial / State sides
Years	Team	Apps	(Points)
1984	Auckland		
1985–94	North Harbour	145	
International career
Years	Team	Apps	(Points)
1988–89	New Zealand	0	(0)
1994–95	Fiji	4	(0)

Ronald Oscar "Ron" Williams (born 20 July 1963) is a former New Zealand rugby union player. A prop, Williams represented North Harbour at a provincial level, and was a member of the New Zealand national side, the All Blacks, in 1988 and 1989. He played 10 tour games for the All Blacks but did not play in any test matches. He later played four tests, including one as captain, for Fiji between 1994 and 1995.
