= 2018–19 Celtic Cup =

- Countries: Ireland; Wales
- Date: 7 September 2018–21 October 2018
- Champions: Leinster A (1st title)
- Runners-up: Scarlets A
- Matches played: 25/25

Official website
- www.irishrugby.ie

The 2018 Celtic Cup is the inaugural edition of the Celtic Cup rugby union competition, which features development regional and provincial teams from Ireland and Wales. It ran for six weeks from September 2018 until October 2018. Leinster A won the inaugural edition, beating Scarlets A in the final.

== Formation ==
The Irish Rugby Football Union and the Welsh Rugby Union created a new development competition, the Celtic Cup, for the emerging professional players from the four Irish provinces and four Welsh regions, announcing the tournament in August 2018.

The tournament, which features development squads from Pro14 teams Connacht, Leinster, Munster, Ulster, Cardiff Blues, Dragons, Ospreys and Scarlets, aims to provide a learning environment for development players, coaches and referees by recreating the week-to-week challenges presented by senior professional rugby.

== 2018 season ==
The first season of the Celtic Cup ran over seven consecutive weeks in 2018. The eight teams were divided into two conferences of four Welsh regions and four Irish provinces. Each Irish province played each of the Welsh regions and against two Irish provinces. Similarly, the Welsh regions played each of the Irish provinces and two of their Welsh counterparts, giving each team three home and three away fixtures. Derby matches were held on the opening and closing weekends of the pools stage, with the four inter-conference rounds in a block from rounds 2 to 5. The top-ranked province from the Irish conference then played the top-ranked region from the Welsh conference in the Celtic Cup Final.

== Conferences ==
Ireland Conference
Team	P	W	D	L	PF	PA	PD	TF	TA	TB	LB	Pts
(Ireland) Leinster A (Q)	6	6	0	0	263	109	+154	38	15	5	0	29
(Ireland) Munster A	6	5	0	1	208	147	+61	25	9	4	0	24
(Ireland) Ulster Ravens	6	4	0	2	165	141	+24	21	20	3	0	19
(Ireland) Connacht Eagles	6	0	0	6	119	214	-95	17	31	2	1	3
(Q)= qualified for final Updated: 19 September 2018; Source: Irish Rugby

Wales Conference
Team	P	W	D	L	PF	PA	PD	TF	TA	TB	LB	Pts
(Wales) Scarlets A (Q)	6	3	0	3	213	143	+70	29	18	5	2	19
(Wales) Cardiff Blues A	6	3	0	3	150	147	+3	21	20	4	2	18
(Wales) Ospreys Development	6	2	0	4	118	244	-126	17	36	2	0	10
(Wales) Dragons U23	6	1	0	5	151	242	-91	23	32	2	0	6
(Q)= qualified for final Updated: 21 October 2018; Source: Welsh Rugby

== Pool Stage ==
=== Round 1 ===
7 September 2018
17:30

Munster A	24–16	Connacht Eagles
Try: Coombes 17' m Hart 40' c Con: Johnston (1/2) 40'; Pen: Johnston (4/4) 50', 52', 68', 74'	Report	Try: de Buitléar 24' c Con: Fitzgerald (1/1) 25'; Pen: Fitzgerald (3/3) 6', 39', 42'

Irish Independent Park
Referee: Jonny Erskine (IRFU)

7 September 2018
17:00

(1 BP) Ulster Ravens	28–43	Leinster A (1 BP)
Try: Hume (2) 15' c, 67' c Rea ?' c Sexton ?' c Con: McPhillips (4/4) 16', ?', ?', 68'	Report	Try: Byrne 24' c Penny 30' c O'Brien 33' c Kelleher 40' c Silvester 51' m Sheehan 76' c Con: Byrne (5/6) 25', 31', 34', 40'+1,77'; Pen: Byrne (1/1) 61'

Gibson Park
Referee: Joy Neville (IRFU)

7 September 2018
19:00

(1 BP) Ospreys Development	41–36	Scarlets A (2 BP)
	Report

Brewery Field

7 September 2018
19:15

Dragons U23	21–37	Cardiff Blues A (1 BP)
Try: Lawrence 32' c Basham 68' c Rosser 74' c Con: Botica (3/3) 32', 68', 74'	Report	Try: Fish (2) 10' c, 36' m T. Williams (2) 24' m, 42' m Summerhill 45' c Con: Shingler (2/5) 10', 45'; Pen: Shingler (2/2) 3', 7'

Rodney Parade

=== Round 2 ===
14 September 2018
19:00

Ulster Ravens	15–45	Scarlets A (1 BP)
Try: Luney 54' c Hall 65' m Con: Houston (1/2) 55'; Pen: Houston (1/1) 7'	Report	Try: Baldwin 25' c Lewis 28' c Williams 34' c Hardy 43' c Ellis-Jones 47' c Conbeer 62' c Con: O'Brien (6/6) 26', 29', 35', 44', 48', 63'; Pen: O'Brien (1/1) 10'

Shaw's Bridge

15 September 2018
13:00

(1 BP) Leinster A	57–10	Cardiff Blues A
Try: Patterson (2) 16' c, 33' c Foley (2) 24' c, 42' c Kelleher 29' c A. Byrne 46' c Dowling 71' c Con: H. Byrne (5/5) 17', 25', 30', 43', 47'; Patterson (1/1) 34'; Hawkshaw (1/1) 72'; Pen: H. Byrne (1/1) 9'	Report	Try: Bennett 65' m T. Williams 76' m

Energia Park
Referee: Rob O'Sullivan (IRFU)

15 September 2018
14:00

Ospreys Development	7–52	Munster A (1 BP)
	Report

St. Helen's

15 September 2018
14:30

Dragons U23 (1 BP)	53–38	Connacht Eagles (1 BP)
	Report

CCSE Ystrad Mynach

=== Round 3 ===
21 September 2018
19:00

(1BP) Connacht Eagles	22-27	Ospreys Development
	Report

Dubarry Park

21 September 2018
17:30

(1 BP) Munster A	34-17	Dragons U23
	Report

Irish Independent Park

22 September 2018
14:30

(1BP) Scarlets A	10-16	Leinster A
	Report

Parc y Scarlets

22 September 2018
14:30

(1BP) Cardiff Blues A	3-7	Ulster Ravens
Pen: Jones	Report	Try: Sexton 20'; Con: Lowry 21'

Cardiff Arms Park

=== Round 4 ===
28 September 2018
19:30

(1BP) Leinster A	53-7	Ospreys Development
Try: Penny 3 B Byrne 2 O'Brien; Foley; A Byrne; Con: Frawley 4 Hawkshaw; Pen: Frawley	Report	Try: Morgan-Williams; Con: J Thomas

Energia Park
Referee: Jonny Erskine (Republic of Ireland)

29 September 2018
14:00

(2BP) Cardiff Blues A	32-33	Munster A (1BP)
	Report

Cardiff Arms Park

29 September 2018
14:30

Ulster Ravens	27-19	Dragons U23
Try: Sexton (2); Con: McPhillips; Pen: McPhillips (5)	Report	Try: Smith; Gasson; Benjamin; Con: Botica (2)

Eaton Park

29 September 2018
14:30

(1 BP) Scarlets A	35–19	Connacht Eagles
	Report

Carmarthen Park

=== Round 5 ===
5 October 2018
19:00

Ospreys Development	19 – 39	Ulster Ravens
Try: Morgan-Williams; Cross; Morris; Con: Evans; Thomas	Report	Try: Cooper; Stewart; Marcus Rea; Ah You; Sexton; Con: Houston (4); Pen: Houston; Drop: Houston

St. Helen's

5 October 2018
19:30

Munster A	40 – 29	Scarlets A
	Report

Irish Independent Park

6 October 2018
14:30

Dragons U23	29 – 48	Leinster A
	Report

CCSE Ystrad Mynach

6 October 2018
TBC

Connacht Eagles	12 – 26	Cardiff Blues A
	Report

The Sportsground

=== Round 6 ===
12/13/14 October 2018
TBC

Leinster A (1 BP)	46 – 25	Munster A
	Report

TBC

14 October 2018
TBC

Connacht Eagles	12 – 49	(1 BP) Ulster Ravens
Try: Kelly; Lane; Con: Mitchell	Report	Try: Sexton (2); Baloucoune (2); Cooper; O'Toole; Montgomery; Con: Houston (6); Stewart

The Sportsground

12/13/14 October 2018
TBC

Cardiff Blues A (1 BP)	42 – 17	Ospreys Development
	Report

TBC

12/13/14 October 2018
TBC

Scarlets A (1 BP)	58 – 12	Dragons U23
	Report

TBC

== Grand Final ==
TBC
19:15

(Ireland) Leinster A Irish champions	15 – 8	(Wales) Scarlets A Welsh champions
Try: R Kelleher (2); Con: C Frawley; Pen: C Frawley	Report	Try: J Sebastian; Pen: J Wilson

Parc y Scarlets
