= Celtic Cup (2018 rugby union tournament) =

- Current season or competition: 2019–20 Celtic Cup
- Sport: Rugby union
- Instituted: 2018
- Inaugural season: 2018
- Ceased: 2020
- Number of teams: 8
- Nations: Ireland; Wales
- Holders: (Ireland) Leinster A (2019-20)
- Most titles: (Ireland) Leinster A (2 titles)
- Related competition: Pro14

The Celtic Cup was a rugby union cup competition featuring development regional and provincial teams from Ireland and Wales that began in 2018. Following two editions the competition was placed on pause due to the Covid pandeic, and was not restarted.

== Formation ==
Following the withdrawal of English clubs from, and the subsequent demise of, the British and Irish Cup in 2018, the Irish Rugby Football Union and the Welsh Rugby Union agreed to create a new development competition, the Celtic Cup, for the emerging professional players from the four Irish provinces and four Welsh regions in 2018. The name had been used previously between 2003 and 2005 for a short lived single elimination knockout competition between teams in the then Celtic League.

The tournament featured development squads from Pro14 teams Connacht, Leinster, Munster, Ulster, Cardiff Blues, the Dragons, the Ospreys and the Scarlets. It aimed to provide a learning environment for players, coaches and referees by recreating the week-to-week challenges presented by senior professional rugby.

== Format and history ==
=== Summary ===
Edition	Year	Final				Teams	Matches
Edition	Year	Winner	Score	Runner-up	Venue	Teams	Matches
I	2018	Leinster A	15–8	Scarlets A	Parc y Scarlets	8	25
II	2019	Leinster A	31–10	Ulster A	Energia Park	8	29

=== 2018 ===
The first season of the Celtic Cup ran over seven consecutive weeks in 2018. The eight teams were divided into two conferences of four Welsh regions and four Irish provinces. Each Irish province played each of the Welsh regions and against two Irish provinces. Similarly, the Welsh regions played each of the Irish provinces and two of their Welsh counterparts. The top-ranked province from the Irish conference played the top-ranked region from the Welsh conference in the final .

Leinster A won the first edition of the new competition, beating Scarlets A 15–8 in the final at Parc y Scarlets.

=== 2019 ===
The second season saw an immediate format change, with the competition defaulting to a single table, and a single round-robin format, each team playing all other teams once. Once more, the competition was run over eight consecutive weeks in 2019. The two highest ranked teams, regardless of nation, proceeded to a final, hosted by the team that finished first in the table.

Leinster A retained their title, defeating fellow Irish province Ulster A 31–10 in the final at Energia Park.

== Teams ==
Ireland

- Connacht
- Leinster
- Munster
- Ulster

Wales

- Cardiff Blues
- Dragons
- Ospreys
- Scarlets
