= Frano Botica =

NZ dual-code international Rugby player

- Born: Frano Michael Botica; 3 August 1963 (age 63) Mangakino, New Zealand
- Height: 175 cm (5 ft 9 in)
- Weight: 75 kg (11 st 11 lb)
- School: Westlake Boys High School
- Notable relative(s): Ben Botica (son); Jacob Botica (son)

Rugby union career
- Position: First five-eighth
Senior career
Years	Team	Apps	(Points)
- North Shore
Provincial / State sides
Years	Team	Apps	(Points)
1985–2001	North Harbour	88	
Super Rugby
Years	Team	Apps	(Points)
1998	Chiefs	1	
International career
Years	Team	Apps	(Points)
1986–1989	New Zealand	7	(6)
1997–1998	Croatia	2	
- Rugby league career

Playing information
- Position: Fullback, wing, five-eighth
Club
Years	Team	Pld	T	G	FG	P
1990–1995	Wigan	179	65	817	13	1931
1995	Auckland Warriors	5	2	19	0	46
1996	Castleford	21	5	84	2	190
	Total	205	72	920	15	2167
Representative
Years	Team	Pld	T	G	FG	P
1991–1993	New Zealand	7	0	25	0	50

Frano Michael Botica (born 3 August 1963) is a New Zealand-Croatian rugby union and rugby league coach and former player in both codes, who played in the 1980s and 1990s. He was also the head coach of the Philippines sevens team.

He represented New Zealand at both codes, and later also played for Croatia in two rugby union World Cup qualifying matches.

== Rugby union ==
Born in Mangakino, New Zealand, Botica played rugby union for club side North Shore, New Zealand provincial side North Harbour, as well as Llanelli in Wales, and spent a period in France.

Botica played 7 test matches between 1986 and 1989 including two test matches in France. Botica was a member of the All Blacks World Cup winning squad of 1987 and toured with the All Blacks to Britain in 1989 and played in several of the mid-week matches.

Botica appeared for the New Zealand Māori (1985-1989), New Zealand Emerging Players (1985), North Island in the 1986 inter-island match and for the Anzac XV that played the British Lions in Australia in 1989. He even appeared in the Super 12, once for the Chiefs in 1998.

He played for New Zealand sevens in eight international tournaments between 1985 and 1988, and was part of the first New Zealand team to win a Hong Kong Sevens title in 1986.

In the early part of his rugby union career he was a rival to Grant Fox for the All Blacks number 10 jersey. Botica was regarded as more a running player whereas Fox was considered a superior kicker and it was Fox who eventually won the selectors' favour, forcing Botica to the bench and restricting the number of rugby union tests he played. Ironically, after switching codes Botica became known as one of the most dependable goal-kickers in rugby league.

== Rugby league ==
=== Club career ===
Botica joined Wigan in British rugby league in 1990. While at Wigan he became a prolific points scorer and the fastest man in the history of British league to reach 1,000 points.

In 1991 he played for the New Zealand Māori side in his first match of rugby league in New Zealand.

During the 1991–92 season, he played for defending champions Wigan on the wing in their 21–4 victory against the visiting Australian champions Penrith in the 1991 World Club Challenge played at Anfield in Liverpool.

During the 1992-93 season, Botica played at Five-eighth for Wigan in the 1992 World Club Challenge against the 1992 Winfield Cup premiers, the Brisbane Broncos. Brisbane became the first Australian side to win the World Club Challenge in England when they defeated Wigan 22–8 at Wigan's Central Park.

Botica played stand-off, and kicked every point in Wigan's 5–4 victory over St. Helens in the 1992 Lancashire Cup Final.

He scored 3 conversions in Wigan's 15–8 victory over Bradford Northern in the 1992–93 Regal Trophy Final, and scored a conversion in the 2–33 defeat by Castleford in the 1993–94 Regal Trophy Final and scored a try and 8 conversions in the 40–10 victory over Warrington in the 1994–95 Regal Trophy Final. Frano Botica holds the records for the most conversions (8) and points (16) in a Regal Trophy (or precursors) Final.

Botica played in the 1994 World Club Challenge against the Broncos again, this time at the ANZ Stadium in Brisbane. Wigan reversed the 1992 result with a 20–14 win in front of a WCC record attendance of 54,220 fans, including a number of Wigan supporters who had travelled to Australia to watch the game. Known as a very accurate goal kicker, Botica kicked four goals from four attempts on the night.

Botica set a new record for most goals in a season for Wigan when he kicked 186 during the 1994–95 Rugby Football League season. He returned to New Zealand to play for the Auckland Warriors during their inaugural year in 1995, before returning to England to play for the Castleford Tigers in 1996.

=== International ===
Botica played in seven internationals for New Zealand between 1991 and 1993.

He made his test début at Fullback against France at Carlaw Park in Auckland on 13 June 1991, kicking eight goals as the Kiwis thrashed the visitors 60–6. He then backed that up with a 6-goal performance in the second test in Christchurch. His selection had seen him flown in from England for the series after a dispute between the New Zealand Rugby League and Manly-Warringah over compensation saw in-form test incumbent Matthew Ridge become unavailable. This dispute, and his own solid form, saw Botica keep his spot for the first test of the 1991 Trans-Tasman Test series against Australia in Melbourne where he kicked four goals and helped the Kiwis to a shock 24–8 win over the Kangaroos. Botica played fullback for the Kiwis in all three tests of the series, eventually won 2–1 by Australia who easily won the second test 44–0 at the Sydney Football Stadium before wrapping up the series with a 40–12 win at Lang Park in Brisbane. The goal kicking Kiwi fullback won praise from Australian coach Bob Fulton who proclaimed that he could play as well as any fullback in the Winfield Cup (NSWRL Premiership). Botica kicked six goals from eight attempts (75%) during the test series.

Botica's last two tests came during the Kiwis' 1993 Tour of Great Britain and France. He played on the wing during the last two tests of the series against the Great Britain Lions at his home ground of Central Park in Wigan and at Headingley in Leeds, though the Lions, who had won the first test at Wembley Stadium 17–0, went on to win the series 3–0. He was not selected for the test against France at the end of the tour and would never again play a test for the Kiwis.

Despite eventually becoming a five-eighth in rugby league, Botica spent much of his early time in the 13-aside code, including five of his seven tests for New Zealand, at fullback or on the wing.

== Return to union ==
When rugby union became openly professional, Botica returned to the 15-a-side code to play for Llanelli in Wales and then in France. In 1997 and 1998 he played for Croatia in two World Cup qualifying matches. In his late 30s he returned for the North Harbour Rugby Union in New Zealand and played several matches, mainly off the bench.

== Later years ==
In 2009 Botica worked with the New Zealand Warriors as a kicking coach. Botica's son Ben is a former member of North Harbour's ITM Cup squad, has represented New Zealand Schoolboys, and formerly played for Aviva Premiership side Harlequin F.C. Another of Botica's sons, Jacob, played for Welsh regional sides Dragons and Scarlets in the United Rugby Championship.

In 2016, Botica became head coach of the Philippines national rugby sevens team. He is a real estate agent, working in Auckland.

Awards
Preceded by Buck Shelford	Tom French Memorial; Māori rugby union player of the year 1986	Succeeded by Buck Shelford
