= 2021 Farah Palmer Cup =

Rugby union competition

2021 Farah Palmer Cup season
- Countries: New Zealand
- Date: 17 July – 9 October
- Champions: Waikato
- Runners-up: Canterbury

Official website
- www.provincial.rugby/farah-palmer-cup/

The 2021 Farah Palmer Cup season was the 15th edition of the competition. It began on 17 July with the finals taking place on 9 October.

In September, due to the COVID-19 restrictions, Auckland, Counties Manukau, & North Harbour withdrew from the remainder of the competition leaving the remaining ten teams to complete the season. The respective finals was played on the first two weekends of October.

Waikato and Manawatū were crowned champions in their respective Farah Palmer Cup competitions; Waikato defeated Canterbury to win the Premiership final, and Manawatu beat Hawke's Bay to win the Championship final.

== Format ==
The competition was divided into two divisions: The Premiership is the top division consisting of seven teams, the winner being crowned the champion while the lowest ranked team will be relegated to the Championship. The Championship is the second division consisting of six teams, the winner of the competition gets promoted to the Premiership for the next year.

== Standings ==
Premiership
#	Team	GP	W	D	L	PF	PA	PD	TB	LB	PTS
1	Canterbury	6	6	0	0	236	89	+147	4	0	28
2	Waikato	4	3	0	1	107	83	+24	3	1	18
3	Wellington	5	3	0	2	129	121	+8	1	2	17
4	Auckland	4	3	0	1	103	69	+34	2	0	16
5	Counties Manukau	5	2	0	3	107	118	–11	1	2	13
6	Bay of Plenty	6	1	0	5	107	162	–55	2	1	7
7	Otago	6	0	0	6	76	223	–147	1	1	2

Championship
#	Team	GP	W	D	L	PF	PA	PD	TB	LB	PTS
1	Manawatu	5	5	0	0	273	36	+237	5	0	25
2	Northland	4	3	0	1	126	73	+53	3	0	17
3	Hawke's Bay	5	3	0	2	203	161	+42	4	0	16
4	North Harbour	4	2	0	2	83	121	–38	3	0	13
5	Taranaki	5	1	0	4	71	160	–89	1	0	5
6	Tasman	5	0	0	5	56	261	–205	1	1	2

Key: JST – JJ Stewart Trophy holders

== Regular season ==
=== Week 1 ===
17 July

Auckland	44–12	Bay of Plenty

Eden Park, Auckland

17 July

JJ – Canterbury	59–12	Counties Manukau

Rugby Park, Christchurch

18 July

Wellington	13–5	Otago

Porirua Park, Wellington

Bye: Waikato

=== Week 2 ===
24 July

North Harbour	35–32	Tasman

North Harbour

24 July

Hawke's Bay	31–46	Northland

McLean Park, Napier

24 July

Waikato	17–24	Canterbury

Waikato

24 July

Counties Manukau	21–13	Bay of Plenty

Navigation Homes Stadium, Pukekohe

24 July

Manawatu	48–5	Taranaki

CET Arena, Palmerston North

25 July

Otago	15–39	Auckland

University of Otago Oval, Dunedin

Bye: Wellington

=== Week 3 ===
31 July

Taranaki	34–12	Tasman

TET Stadium & Events Centre, Inglewood

31 July

Hawke's Bay	45–24	North Harbour

Tremain Field, Napier

31 July

Bay of Plenty	10–27	Waikato

31 July

Northland	12–39	Manawatu

Semenoff Stadium, Whangārei

1 August

Counties Manukau	39–7	Otago

Navigation Homes Stadium, Pukekohe

1 August

JJ – Canterbury	23–22	Wellington

Rugby Park, Christchurch

Bye: Auckland

=== Week 4 ===
6 August

Manawatu	67–12	Hawke's Bay

CET Arena, Palmerston North

7 August

Wellington	26–25	Counties Manukau

Sky Stadium, Wellington

7 August

Otago	22–29	Waikato

Forsyth Barr Stadium, Dunedin

8 August

North Harbour	24–10	Taranaki

North Harbour Stadium

8 August

Tasman	0–27	Northland

Sports Park

8 August

Auckland	7–32	Canterbury

Eden Park, Auckland

Bye: Bay of Plenty

=== Week 5 ===
13 August

Counties Manukau	10–13	Auckland

Navigation Homes Stadium, Pukekohe

14 August

Manawatu	34–0	North Harbour

CET Arena, Palmerston North

14 August

Hawke's Bay	80–5	Tasman

McLean Park, Napier

14 August

JJ – Canterbury	26–7	Bay of Plenty

Orangetheory Stadium, Christchurch

15 August

Waikato	34–27	Wellington

FMG Stadium Waikato, Hamilton

15 August

Northland	41–3	Taranaki

Semenoff Stadium, Whangarei

Bye: Otago

=== Week 6 ===
18 September

Bay of Plenty	31–3	Otago

Mt Maunganui

=== Week 7 ===
25 September

Otago	24–72	Canterbury

Forsyth Barr Stadium

25 September

Bay of Plenty	34–41	Wellington

Blake Park

25 September

Taranaki	19–35	Hawke's Bay

TET Stadium & Events Centre, Inglewood

26 September

Tasman	7–85	Manawatu

Trafalgar Park, Nelson

== Play-offs ==
Championship

Semi-final
1 October – Semenoff Stadium
Hawke's Bay	27
Northland	26

Final
9 October – Palmerston North
Manawatu	55
Hawke's Bay	12

Premiership

Semi-final
2 October – FMG Stadium Waikato
Waikato	26
Wellington	10

Final
9 October – Christchurch
Waikato	22
Canterbury	20

=== Semi-finals ===
Championship

1 October

Northland	26–27	Hawke's Bay

Semenoff Stadium, Whangarei

Premiership

2 October

Waikato	26–10	Wellington

FMG Stadium Waikato

=== Finals ===
Premiership

9 October

Canterbury	20–22	Waikato

Christchurch

Championship

9 October

Manawatu	55–12	Hawke's Bay

Palmerston North

== JJ Stewart Trophy ==
The JJ Stewart Trophy is a trophy based on a challenge system, rather than a league or knockout competition as with most football trophies. The holding union must defend the trophy in challenge matches, and if a challenger defeats them, they become the new holder of the trophy.
