= Takapuna Rugby Football Club =

Coordinates: 36.792664006°S 174.75015606°E

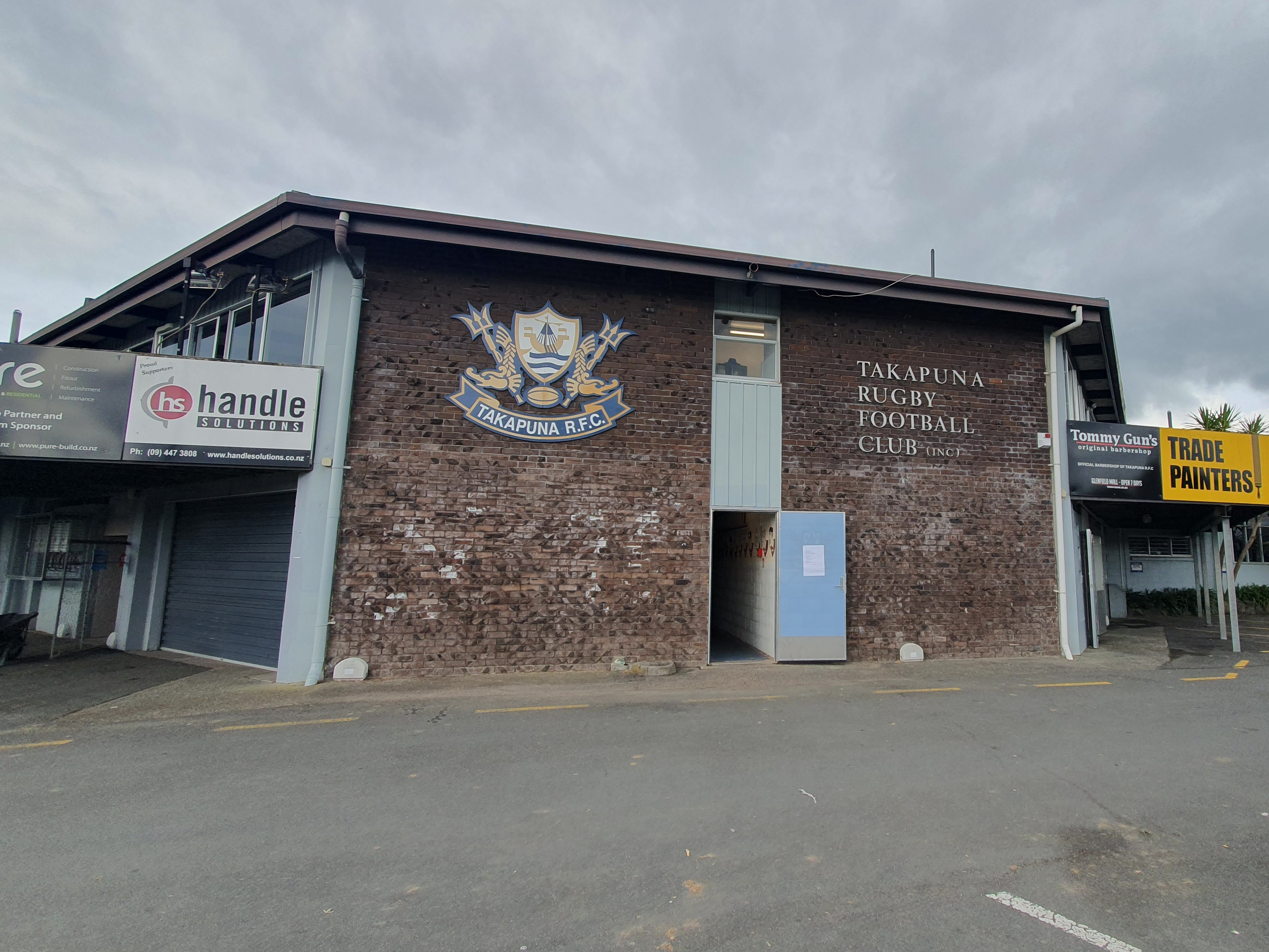
- Union: North Harbour Rugby Union
- Founded: 1934
- Location: Takapuna, Auckland
- Ground: Onewa Domain
- President: Simon Cheesman
- League: North Harbour Rugby Premier 1
- 2023: Season, 3rd of 9 Playoffs, 2nd

Official website
- www.takapunarugby.co.nz

Takapuna Rugby Football Club is a rugby union club based in Takapuna, New Zealand. The club was established in 1934 and is a member of the North Harbour Rugby Union. Until 1985, Takapuna was a member of the Auckland Rugby Football Union. The club is based at Onewa Domain, which was also home to North Harbour until 1997.

== History ==
Takapuna is one of only two teams from the current North Harbour union (the other being North Shore) to have won the Auckland championship, having done so in 1940 and 1980. Since North Shore's only win came in 1899, Takapuna are the only North Harbour club to have been awarded the Gallaher Shield. Since the establishment of the North Harbour union in 1985, Takapuna has dominated the senior competition, winning the North Harbour championship 12 out of a possible 29 times, including seven titles in a row between 1994 and 2000. Between 1991 and 2009 Takapuna played in 17 finals winning 12 times. Takapuna only missed 2 Premier finals during this period (1993 and 2003).

== Club honours ==
Auckland Championship (2): 1940, 1980

Auckland Under 21 Championship (1): 1977

Auckland Third Grade Championship (2): 1978, 1979

North Harbour Championship (13): 1994, 1995, 1996, 1997, 1998, 1999, 2000, 2002, 2006, 2007, 2008, 2009, 2022

North Harbour Senior First Championship (4): 1994, 1997, 1999,2025

North Harbour Under 21 Championship (10): 1985, 1986, 1991, 1995, 1996, 1997, 1999, 2001, 2006, 2012

North Harbour Under 19 Championship (3): 1995, 1998, 2004

North Harbour Under 85 Championship (8): 1985, 1988, 1989, 2013, 2015, 2018, 2022, 2023

North Harbour Women's Championship (2): 2003, 2009

North Harbour Sevens Championship (5): 2000, 2001, 2002, 2003, 2007

Blues Club Competition (1): 2001

== Notable players ==
All Blacks

Takapuna has produced eight All Blacks players, listed as follows:

Greg Burgess (1980,1 test match)

Graham Dowd (1992,1 test match)

Eric Rush (1992-1996,9 test matches)

Blair Larsen (1992-1996,17 test matches)

Glen Osborne (1995-1999,19 test matches)

James Parsons (2014-2016,2 test matches)

Matt Duffie (2017- 2 matches)

Karl Tu'inukuafe (2018,13 test matches )

New Zealand U85 Barbarians:

Jackson Ephraims (2022, 2023)

North Harbour Centurions

Graham Dowd (1985 – 1994, 107 games)

James Parsons (2007 – 2020, 103 games)

North Harbour Representatives

H Amosa 1991 (8 matches), MI Begbie 1987 (1), SC Bendall 1987-90 (12), S Biddles 2007-2008 (13), D Boland 1985 (2), LD Bone 1999 (3), KG Boroevich 1990-95 (17), GW Brunsdon 1986-88 (2), PR Cole 1991 (6), GS Davis 1996-99 (40), A Donald 2001 – 2006 (34), GW Dowd 1985-94 (106), C Eagle 1994-96 (11), J Elrick 2005-2013 (20), SB Eskrigge 1996 (8), IF Fa'alogo 2000 (1) PIP Feeney 1985-90 (66), M France 2008-2009 (20), RJ Fry 1987 (6), AJ Fulton 1997-99(17), D George 1992-98 (39), S Hall 1991 (6), RD Hartley 1986-88 (25), SE Kose 1990-91 (10), AC Larkin 1995-97 (26), B P Larsen 1991-97 (82), Z Lawrence 2004-2007 (26), PFH Leonard 1985-91 (40), MJ Lord 1999-00 (13), J Manihera (24), P Masani 1996-97 (6), MW Mills 1985-87 (25), CW Moors 1995-99 (11), S Neville 2010, 2017 (7), NM Ngapaku 1999 (2), MD Nichols 1985 (10), GM Osborne 1994-99 (53), SK Palmer 1992-97 (31), WJ Pivac 1986-87 (13), H Reid 2002-2003 (12), MP Roberts 1995-98 (7), DH Robson 2000 (1), CJ Rose 1998 (3), RB Rush 1995-96 (3), EJ Rush 1991-99(90), MC Ruth 1989-91 (9), C Smith 2007-2013 (55), JC Smith 1998-00 (7), C Thomas 1998 (1), J Tofa Va'a (9) 2015, BW Urlich 1998-00 (28), M Veale 2003-2005 (32), WCA Walker 1997-98 (7), HG Wallace 1999-00 (8), GL Walsh 1991-96 (55), DR Williams 1988-89 (12), PG Woods 1994-97 (41), B Wilson 2003-2011 (30) Wiggins 2015 (2)
