= 2020 Farah Palmer Cup =

2020 Farah Palmer Cup season
- Countries: New Zealand
- Date: 5 September – 31 October 2020
- Champions: Canterbury
- Runners-up: Waikato
- Matches played: 39
- Tries scored: 377 (average 9.7 per match)
- Top point scorer: Kendra Cocksedge (Canterbury); 80 points

Official website
- www.provincial.rugby/farah-palmer-cup/

The 2020 Farah Palmer Cup season was the 14th season of New Zealand's women's provincial rugby union competition since it changed formats in 2006, having not been held in 2010. The regular season began on 5 September with Waikato hosting a match against Northland. It involved the top thirteen rugby unions of New Zealand. The competition is known as the Farah Palmer Cup after former Black Ferns captain, Farah Palmer and it is the fifth season under this name. To cut down on travel, the teams were split into North and South pools for the 2020 season, due to the COVID-19 pandemic, and thus no promotion or relegation was applied.

== Format ==
The Farah Palmer Cup standings are sorted by a competition points system. Four points are awarded to the winning team, a draw earns two points, whilst a loss amounts to zero points. Unions can also win their side a respectable bonus point. To receive a bonus point, they must score four tries or more, or lose by seven points or less. Each team is placed on their total points received. If a tiebreaker is necessary, when two or more teams finish on equal points, the union who acquired more competition points against the other tied team(s) gets placed higher. In the case that separation is still not made, the winner of the head-to-head result between the teams will get rights to be ranked above. This seeding format was only implemented for the 2020 competition.

The regular season consists of two types of matches. Each union play home or away games against each team from their division, making a total of six competition games during the regular season for each union in the North pool, and five regular season games for those in the South pool. The finals format sees the top two teams from each pool qualify for cross-over semi-finals. The top placed teams in each pool, based on table points, receive a home semi-final. In the first round of the finals, the semi-finals, the top placed North team is to host the second-placed South team, and the first-placed South team is to host the Second placed North team. The final is to be hosted by the top remaining seed.

== Standings ==
North Division
#	Team	GP	W	D	L	PF	PA	PD	TB	LB	PTS
1	Waikato	6	6	0	0	237	74	+163	4	0	28
2	Auckland	6	4	0	2	200	103	+97	5	0	21*
3	Northland	6	4	0	2	233	75	+158	4	1	21*
4	Counties Manukau	6	4	0	2	297	104	+193	4	1	21*
5	Bay of Plenty	6	2	0	4	179	126	+53	2	2	12
6	Taranaki	6	1	0	5	69	400	–331	1	0	5
7	North Harbour	6	0	0	6	54	387	-333	1	1	2

South Division
#	Team	GP	W	D	L	PF	PA	PD	TB	LB	PTS
1	JST – Canterbury	5	5	0	0	331	47	+284	5	0	25
2	Manawatu	5	4	0	1	186	90	+96	4	0	20
3	Wellington	5	3	0	2	196	126	+70	3	1	16
4	Otago	5	2	0	3	144	184	–40	3	1	12
5	Hawke's Bay	5	1	0	4	126	202	-76	1	0	5
6	Tasman	5	0	0	4	29	363	-334	0	1	1

Key: JST - JJ Stewart Trophy holders

* - If three or more Provincial Unions are tied on points, the team with the most competition points against the other tied teams advances. In this instance, Auckland and Northland had six points, Counties Manukau had five. Auckland got six points out of their games with Counties Manukau and Northland (1 against Counties and 5 against Northland). Counties got five points against Auckland and none against Northland, Northland got six points (1 against Auckland and five against Counties). That meant it was between Auckland and Northland, and with Auckland beating Northland head-to-head in pool play, they claim the semi-final position.

=== Standings progression ===
North Division
Team	W1	W2	W3	W4	W5	W6	W7
Auckland	5 (2nd)	10 (1st)	11 (2nd)	16 (1st)	21 (1st)	21 (2nd)	21 (2nd)
Bay of Plenty	0 (4th)	5 (4th)	5 (4th)	10 (3rd)	11 (4th)	12 (5th)	12 (5th)
Counties Manukau	5 (1st)	5 (3rd)	10 (3rd)	10 (4th)	12 (3rd)	16 (4th)	21 (4th)
North Harbour	0 (5th)	0 (7th)	2 (6th)	2 (7th)	2 (7th)	2 (7th)	2 (7th)
Northland	0 (5th)	1 (5th)	1 (7th)	6 (5th)	11 (5th)	16 (3rd)	21 (3rd)
Taranaki	0 (6th)	0 (6th)	5 (5th)	5 (6th)	5 (6th)	5 (6th)	5 (6th)
Waikato	4 (3rd)	9 (2nd)	13 (1st)	13 (2nd)	18 (2nd)	23 (1st)	28 (1st)
South Division
Team	W1	W2	W3	W4	W5	W6	W7
Canterbury	0 (1st)	5 (2nd)	10 (2nd)	15 (1st)	20 (1st)	20 (1st)	25 (1st)
Hawke's Bay	0 (2nd)	0 (4th)	0 (5th)	0 (5th)	5 (5th)	5 (5th)	5 (5th)
Manawatu	0 (3rd)	0 (5th)	5 (3rd)	10 (3rd)	15 (2nd)	15 (2nd)	20 (2nd)
Otago	0 (4th)	5 (3rd)	5 (4th)	10 (4th)	10 (4th)	10 (4th)	12 (4th)
Tasman	0 (5th)	0 (6th)	0 (6th)	0 (6th)	0 (6th)	0 (6th)	0 (6th)
Wellington	0 (6th)	5 (1st)	10 (1st)	12 (2nd)	12 (3rd)	12 (3rd)	16 (3rd)
The table above shows a team's progression throughout the season. For each week, their cumulative points total is shown with the overall division log position in brackets.
Key:	win	draw	loss	bye			

== Regular season ==
The 2020 Farah Palmer Cup was played across seven weeks. The competition started on Saturday, 5 September 2020, with Waikato hosting a match against Northland at University of Waikato in Hamilton.

=== Week 1 ===
5 September 2020	Waikato	18–5	Northland

5 September 2020	Counties Manukau	89–3	North Harbour

6 September 2020	Otago	29–20	Hawke's Bay

Bye: Bay of Plenty, South Division Teams

=== Week 2 ===
11 September 2020	North Harbour	17–67	Bay of Plenty

12 September 2020	Waikato	76–14	Taranaki

12 September 2020	Manawatu	10–36	Canterbury

12 September 2020	Tasman	0–62	Wellington

13 September 2020	Northland	22–29	Auckland

13 September 2020	Otago	29–20	Hawke's Bay

Bye: Counties Manukau

=== Week 3 ===
19 September 2020	Wellington	67–17	Hawke's Bay

19 September 2020	JJ –Canterbury	85–10	Otago

19 September 2020	Taranaki	32–29	North Harbour

19 September 2020	Bay of Plenty	10–21	Waikato

20 September 2020	Manawatu	88–0	Tasman

20 September 2020	Auckland	29–43	Counties Manukau

Bye: Northland

=== Week 4 ===
25 September 2020	Wellington	28–31	Manawatu

26 September 2020	Tasman	24–67	Otago

26 September 2020	North Harbour	0–72	Auckland

26 September 2020	Bay of Plenty	73–17	Taranaki

26 September 2020	Hawke's Bay	15–72	Canterbury

27 September 2020	Counties Manukau	20–32	Northland

Bye: Waikato

=== Week 5 ===
3 October 2020	Auckland	22–19	Bay of Plenty

3 October 2020	Northland	65–5	North Harbour

3 October 2020	Waikato	34–28	Counties Manukau

3 October 2020	JJ – Canterbury	54–12	Wellington

4 October 2020	Tasman	5–62	Hawke's Bay

4 October 2020	Otago	14–28	Manawatu

Bye: Taranaki

=== Week 6 ===
10 October 2020	North Harbour	0–62	Waikato

10 October 2020	Counties Manukau	17–10	Bay of Plenty

11 October 2020	Northland	77–3	Taranaki

Bye: Auckland, South Division Teams

=== Week 7 ===
16 October 2020	Hawke's Bay	12–29	Manawatu

17 October 2020	JJ – Canterbury	84–0	Tasman

17 October 2020	Bay of Plenty	0–32	Northland

17 October 2020	Taranaki	3–107	Counties Manukau

18 October 2020	Wellington	27–24	Otago

18 October 2020	Auckland	17–26	Waikato

Bye: North Harbour

== Play-offs ==
Semi-finals
1	Waikato	31
4	Manawatu	14
2	Canterbury	36
3	Auckland	21

Final
1	Waikato	7
2	Canterbury	8

=== Semi-finals ===
25 October 2020
16:35 NZST

Canterbury	36–21	Auckland
Try: McGoverne 9', 41', 49' m Bremner 37'; Curtis 40+3'; Nelles 69'; Con: Cocksedge (3/6) 10', 42', 69'		Try: Elliot 26'; Fitzpatrick 52'; Abraham 63'; Con: Maliepo (0/3); Pen: Maliepo (2/2) 24', 56'

Rugby Park, Christchurch
Referee: Lauren Jenner (New Zealand)

25 October 2020
14:05 NZST

Waikato	31–14	Manawatu
Try: Alley 3'; Kalounivale 9'; Robins-Reti 33'; Fluhler 47', 56'; Con: Alley (3/5) 4', 34', 57'; Cards: Robins-Reti (yellow card) 42' to 52'		Try: Lush 65' c Sturmey 79'; Con: Winiata (2/2) 65', 80'

Central Energy Trust Arena, Palmerston North
Referee: Maggie Cogger-Orr (New Zealand)

=== Finals ===
31 October 2020
14:15 NZST

Canterbury	8–7	Waikato
Try: Nelles 80+1'; Con: Cocksedge (0/1); Pen: Cocksedge (1/1) 31'		Try: Simon 66'; Con: Alley (1/1) 66'; Pen: Alley (0/2)

Rugby Park, Christchurch
Referee: Rebecca Mahoney (New Zealand)

== JJ Stewart Trophy ==
The JJ Stewart Trophy is a trophy based on a challenge system, rather than a league or knockout competition as with most football trophies. The holding union must defend the trophy in challenge matches, and if a challenger defeats them, they become the new holder of the trophy.

Canterbury started the season as holders of the trophy and as such, were obligated to place the trophy up for challenge in all of their regular season home games.

Successful JJ Stewart Trophy challenges were played by Canterbury in Round 3, Round 5 and Round 7 against Otago, Wellington and Tasman respectively.
