= North Shore Rugby Football Club =

NZ rugby union club, based in Auckland

Coordinates: 36.8243670572°S 174.805429768°E

(New Zealand) North Shore Rugby Football Club
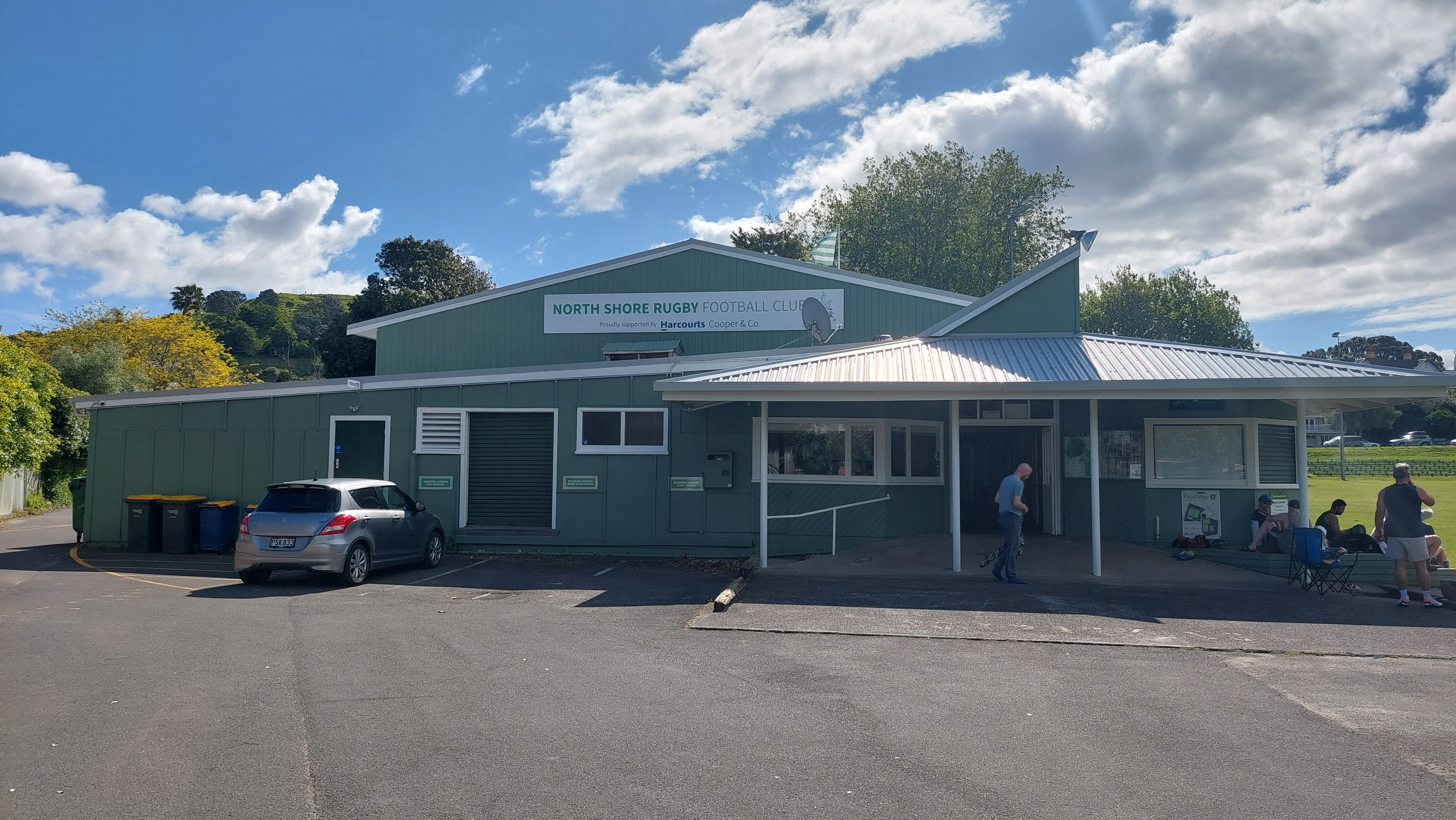
- The North Shore Rugby Football Club building
- Union: North Harbour Rugby Union
- Nickname: The Pride
- Founded: 1873; 153 years ago
- Location: Devonport, Auckland
- Ground: Devonport Domain (Capacity: 2500)
- President: Pip Eagles
- League: North Harbour Rugby Premier 1
- 2023: Season, 1st of 9 Playoffs, 1st (champions)

Official website
- www.northshorerugby.co.nz

The North Shore Rugby Football Club is a rugby union club based in Devonport, New Zealand. The club is a member of the North Harbour Rugby Union. Until 1985, with the creation of the North Harbour union, North Shore was a member of the Auckland Rugby Football Union.

== History ==
The club was established in May 1873, making North Shore the oldest club in Auckland and one of the oldest in New Zealand. The club has been based at Devonport Domain since the early twentieth century and adopted its current green and white hoops in 1935. The club won the Auckland championship on one occasion, in 1899, and has won the North Harbour championship on ten occasions.

== Honours ==
Auckland Championships (1): 1899

North Harbour Premiership Winners (10): 1987, 1988, 1992, 2001, 2011, 2014, 2021, 2023, 2024, 2025

North Harbour Reserve Grade Winners (14): 1986, 1987, 1989, 1998, 2000, 2002, 2006, 2008, 2010, 2012, 2014, 2016, 2019, 2023

North Harbour Under 21 Winners (4):1994, 1998, 2009, 2010, 2024, 2025 2024

== Notable players ==
- Stuart Krohn (born 1962), professional rugby union player
- Buck Shelford (born 1957)
- Brad Johnstone (born 1950)
- Frano Botica (born 1963)
- Ben Botica (born 1989)
- Jacob Botica (born 1993)
- Sione Mafileo (born 1993)
