= Jacob Botica =

New Zealand rugby union player

- Born: Jacob Botica; 3 March 1993 (age 33) Wigan, Greater Manchester, England

Rugby union career
- Position: Fly-half
- Current team: SAXV Charente
- Correct as of 12:16, 5 March 2020 (UTC)
Provincial / State sides
Years	Team	Apps	(Points)
2016–2018	RGC 1404	0	(0)
2018	Scarlets	1	(0)
2018–2020	Dragons	9	(0)

Jacob Botica is an English-born New Zealand rugby union player who plays as a fly-half for SAXV Charente. Previously, he played for RGC 1404 in the Welsh Premiership and the Dragons in the Pro14 and also made an appearance for the Scarlets in the Anglo-Welsh Cup.

He is the son of former dual-code rugby international Frano Botica and younger brother of rugby union player Ben Botica.
