= North Harbour Rugby Union =

Sports club

- Sport: Rugby union
- Abbreviation: NHRU
- Founded: 1985; 41 years ago
- Affiliation: New Zealand Rugby
- Regional affiliation: Auckland
- Headquarters: Albany
- President: Simon Williamson
- Chairperson: Gerard van Tilborg
- CEO: Adrian Donald
- Sponsor: Go Media

Official website
- www.harbourrugby.co.nz
- (New Zealand)

The North Harbour Rugby Union (NHRU), commonly known as North Harbour or simply Harbour, is the governing body of rugby union that encompasses a wide geographical area north of Auckland that includes North Shore City, Rodney District, the Hibiscus Coast and part of Waitakere City. There are 12 rugby clubs from Mahurangi RFC, based in Warkworth, Rodney District, in the north through to Massey the southernmost area of the union.

The NHRU provincial rugby team that was formed in 1985 by clubs that left the Auckland Rugby Union. It competes in the National Provincial Championship (NPC).

== History ==
North Harbour was formed in 1985 by clubs that broke away from the Auckland Rugby Union. The Hibiscus flower was chosen as the new union's logo in reference to part of the union's catchment area - the Hibiscus Coast. Since its foundation, the team doctor was Dr John Mayhew, until his death on 9 April 2025.

The first side chosen to represent the union was an under 20 side who played Felbridge, a touring side from Britain. Grant Ferguson scored the union's first points via a penalty, with his captain, Alan McCulloch scoring the union's first try.

The union expanded in 1989 when the Omaha, Warkworth and Kaipara Flats clubs merged to become the Mahurangi club and switched from the North Auckland union.

North Harbour has enjoyed a great deal of success on the rugby field having produced All Blacks and other New Zealand representative players, and also winning the 3rd division title in their first year, then promotion to NPC Division 1, and making the finals of the NPC competition on several occasions during the 1990s, including hosting the 1994 final at a capacity-crowd Onewa Domain against Auckland and qualifying for the Super 10 competition in 1993, 1994 and 1995.

Wordmark logo

Onewa Domain, Northcote was the former home base for North Harbour rugby. With the development of the North Harbour Stadium at Albany in the late 1990s, this stadium became the home base of Harbour rugby.

In 2006 North Harbour were the first team to play the new Tasman Makos winning 33–27 in Blenheim. They would go on to win their next eight of ten games including an historical victory over Canterbury for the Ranfurly Shield. However they were beaten by Otago 21–56 in the quarter-finals. 2007 was a year of disappointment for North Harbour. Waikato claimed the Ranfurly Shield, winning 52–7 over the holders North Harbour. The team would only win four of ten matches including two draws to miss the playoffs. North Harbour won only three matches in 2008 finishing 12th. 2009 was the same with North Harbour finishing 12th, however they defeated the champions Canterbury 22–19 in the opening round and beat Auckland 16–14 at Eden Park. In 2010 North Harbour beat Japan 23–19 to start their 25th Jubilee Celebrations. However, the team managed only four wins to finish 11th. In 2011 the team finished sixth in the Championship, but nearly beat Southland 23–25 in a Ranfurly Challenge. 2012 and 2013 were disappointing years for North Harbour, as they finished last in the Championship with only one win.

2014 was less successful for North Harbour, as they only won three games, against Manawatu (24-13), Canterbury (29-24) and Hawkes Bay (28-25).

2015 seemed the same for North Harbour, they won 3 games again, against Southland (26-25), Counties Manukau (28-20) and Northland (36-12).

2016 saw North Harbour get promoted up from the Championship division, beating Counties Manukau (20-17), Manawatu (29-25), Southland (35-14), Bay of Plenty (44-34), and Northland (44-28),They defeated Wellington in the semi-final (40-37) and defeating Otago to be promoted to the 2017 Premiership (17-14)

In 2017, North Harbour won a lot of their games, beating Otago (19-17), Southland (45-20), their greatest Battle of the Bridge win against Auckland (57-10), Counties Manukau (27-18), Northland (22-31), Hawke's Bay (33-30), Waikato (13-11), They made the semi-finals but did not beat Canterbury (35-24 loss)

2018 saw North Harbour beat Northland (21-20), Waikato (28-29), Bay of Plenty (32-30), Hawke's Bay (34-51), Taranaki (26-55), Counties Manukau (36-26).

== Club and high-school rugby ==
The North Harbour Club Rugby season runs annually from March through to the beginning of August. The premier title is fought for among senior teams for the right to be crowned North Harbour Club Rugby Champions. The winner receives the ASB Cup.

There are also 16 secondary schools fielding close to 100 teams within the North Harbour Region. Due to the ratio of secondary schools to rugby clubs, there is a strong relationship between the two.

=== Member clubs ===
- Mahurangi
- Silverdale
- Helensville
- Kumeu (Riverhead)
- Massey
- East Coast Bays RFC
- Glenfield
- Northcote
- Takapuna
- North Shore
- Marist
- Royal New Zealand Navy

=== Club Champions ===
For list of North Harbour club rugby champions, see North Harbour Club Rugby Champions

== National Provincial Championship (NPC) ==
=== Ranfurly Shield ===
North Harbour's first ten challenges for the Ranfurly Shield were unsuccessful, notably in 1996 when they challenged for it three times in 6 weeks against Taranaki, Waikato and Auckland. North Harbour succeeded in their eleventh challenge for the shield on 24 September 2006 by beating the previous holders Canterbury 21–17 at Jade Stadium in Christchurch.

Under the rules of the Shield challenge, they had to defend the Shield before the 2007 Air New Zealand Cup season against teams in New Zealand's second tier domestic competition, the semi-professional Heartland Championship. Accordingly, they scheduled defences against Thames Valley on 30 June 2007 and Horowhenua-Kapiti on 14 July. Harbour easily won their first defence 69–0 over Thames Valley, and followed it up two weeks later with a 99–6 victory over Horowhenua-Kapiti.

After defeating Taranaki 19–13 in their first challenge in the Air New Zealand Cup, North Harbour lost the Ranfurly Shield to Waikato by a record margin of 52–7.

=== Notable former players ===
The following have played for North Harbour and have gone on to play international rugby or accomplish other feats as listed:

- Liam Barry (former All Black and North Harbour Head Coach)
- Frano Botica (former All Black, former Kiwi League International and former Croatian International)
- Frank Bunce (former All Black, Western Samoa centre, New Zealand Sevens)
- Todd Clever (USA Eagles captain)
- Daniel Devereaux (former Cook Island half back)
- Graham Dowd (former All Black hooker)
- Nick Evans (former All Black and played for Harlequins
- Rico Gear (former All Black, now plays for Worcester Warriors)
- Hosea Gear (former All Black)
- Mike Harris (moved to Australia in 2011 and played for the Queensland Reds, Melbourne Rebels and Wallabies)
- Ian Jones (former All Black Lock)
- Blair Larsen (former All Black forward)
- Silao Leaega - Samoan International
- Walter Little (former All Black second-five eight)
- Jonah Lomu (former All Black wing)
- Willie Losʻe (former Tongan international team captain and lock, now a TV & Radio personality)
- Luke McAlister (former All Black and played for Stade Toulousain)
- Slade McFarland (former Chiefs, Blues, Crusaders, Maori All Blacks and NZ A representative)
- Glen Osborne (former All Black fullback)
- Tusi Pisi & George Pisi – Samoan internationals
- Eric Rush (former All Black winger and Captain of NZ 7s
- Francis Saili (former All Black second-five eight)
- Buck Shelford (former All Black captain and former North Harbour coach)
- Tevita Taumoepeau
- Rua Tipoki (Captain 2005–06; first ever North Harbour captain to win Ranfurly Shield)
- Richard Turner(former All Black)
- Tony Woodcock (former All Black Two-time Rugby World Cup winner, scorer of only NZ try in 2011 final)

=== Mascot ===
The Harbour Master is the official Mascot for the North Harbour Rugby Union, He is dressed in a naval captain's style suit with a large smiling head and carries with him at all times an oversized pair of binoculars.

In 2008 the Harbour Master was involved in a tackle which resulted in the rival seagull mascot from Auckland breaking his leg.

=== Kit and sponsors ===
North Harbour apparel is supplied by Paladin Sports, who are a Major Partner. North Harbour's other Major Partners have been:

- Go Media (Principal Partner)

- CMP Construction

- NHR Group

- Merlin

- Exedy

- Kennards Hire

- North Harbour Ford

- Barfoot & Thompson

- McDonald's

- Gallagher Insurance

== Super Rugby ==
North Harbour is one of three provinces included in the Blues franchise who play in the Super Rugby competition; their players are eligible to be picked by the Blues without relying on player drafting.

At the beginning of Super Rugby, North Harbour was part of the Chiefs franchise as a combined team of Auckland and North Harbour was thought to be unfair by the NZRU; Auckland and North Harbour collectively had a large percentage of the All Blacks of the time. Later however, North Harbour along with Northland were 'swapped' for Counties Manukau and Thames Valley, thus joined the Blues.

Prior to the professionalisation of rugby, North Harbour competed as a stand-alone union in the predecessor to Super Rugby, the Super 10 competition, in 1993, 1994 and 1995.
