= 2025 Birthday Honours (New Zealand) =

Awards list for New Zealand

2025 King's Birthday Honours
- Previous: 2025 New Year Honours; Next: 2025 New Zealand bravery awards
- Type: New Zealand royal honours: New Zealand Order of Merit; King's Service Order; King's Service Medal
- Date: 2 June 2025
- Country: New Zealand
- Total recipients: 188

The 2025 King's Birthday Honours in New Zealand, celebrating the official birthday of King Charles III, were appointments made by the King in his right as King of New Zealand, on the advice of the New Zealand government, to various orders and honours to reward and highlight good works by New Zealanders. The honours were announced on 2 June 2025.

The recipients of honours are listed here as they were styled before their new honour.

== New Zealand Order of Merit ==
=== Dame Companion (DNZM) ===
- Ranjna Patel ONZM QSM JP – of Auckland. For services to ethnic communities, health and family violence prevention.
- Emeritus Distinguished Professor Alison Stewart CNZM – of Prebbleton. For services to plant science and the arable sector.
- Catriona Ruth Williams MNZM – of Masterton. For services to spinal cord injury research and equestrian sport.
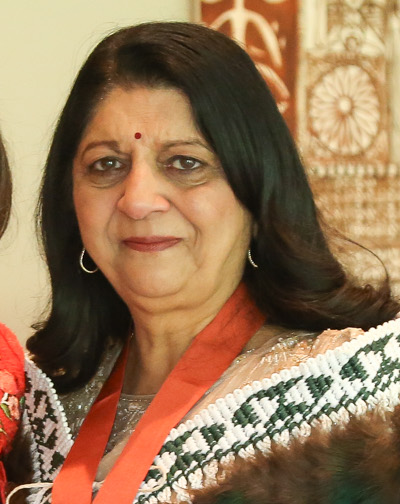
Dame Ranjna Patel

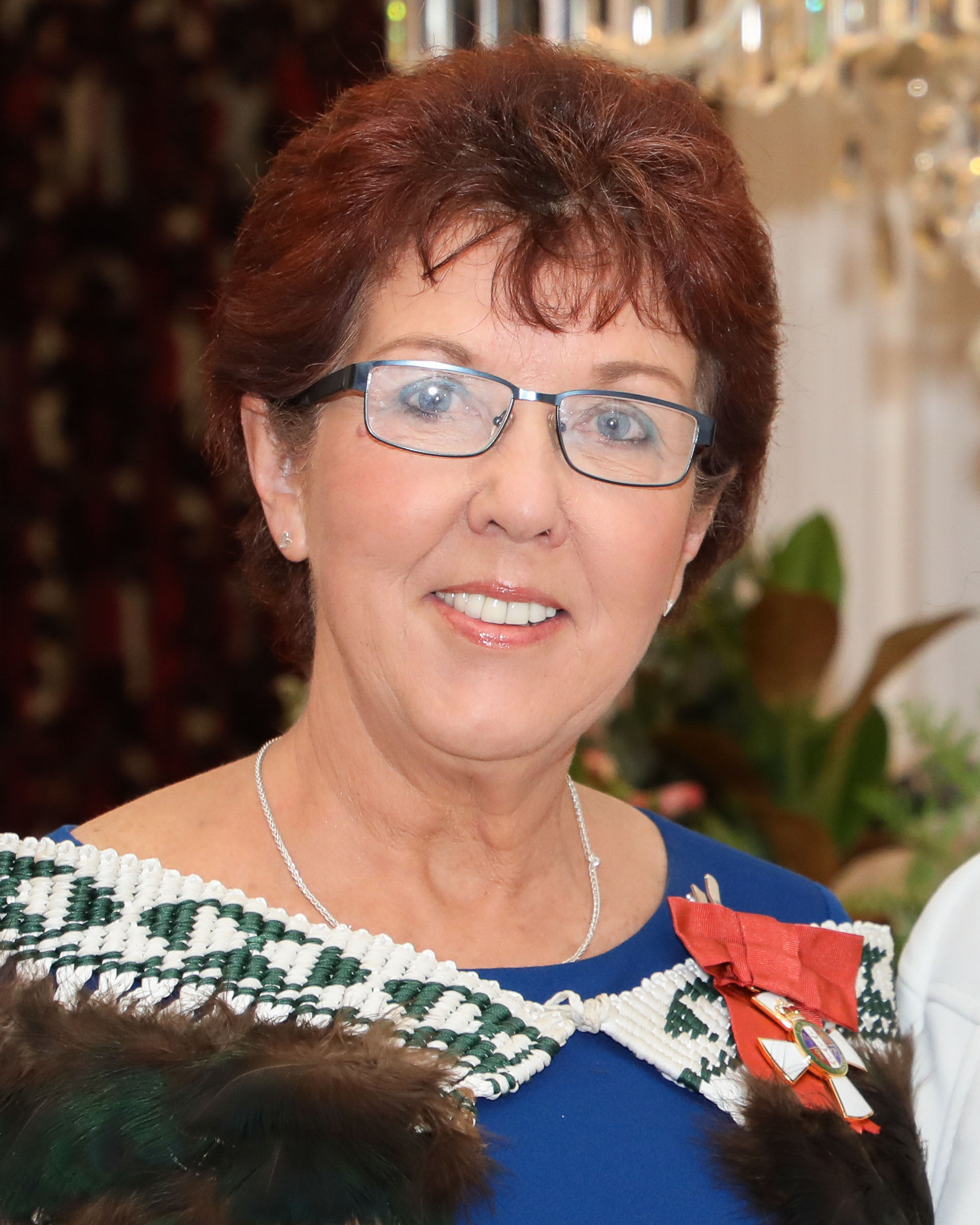
Dame Alison Stewart

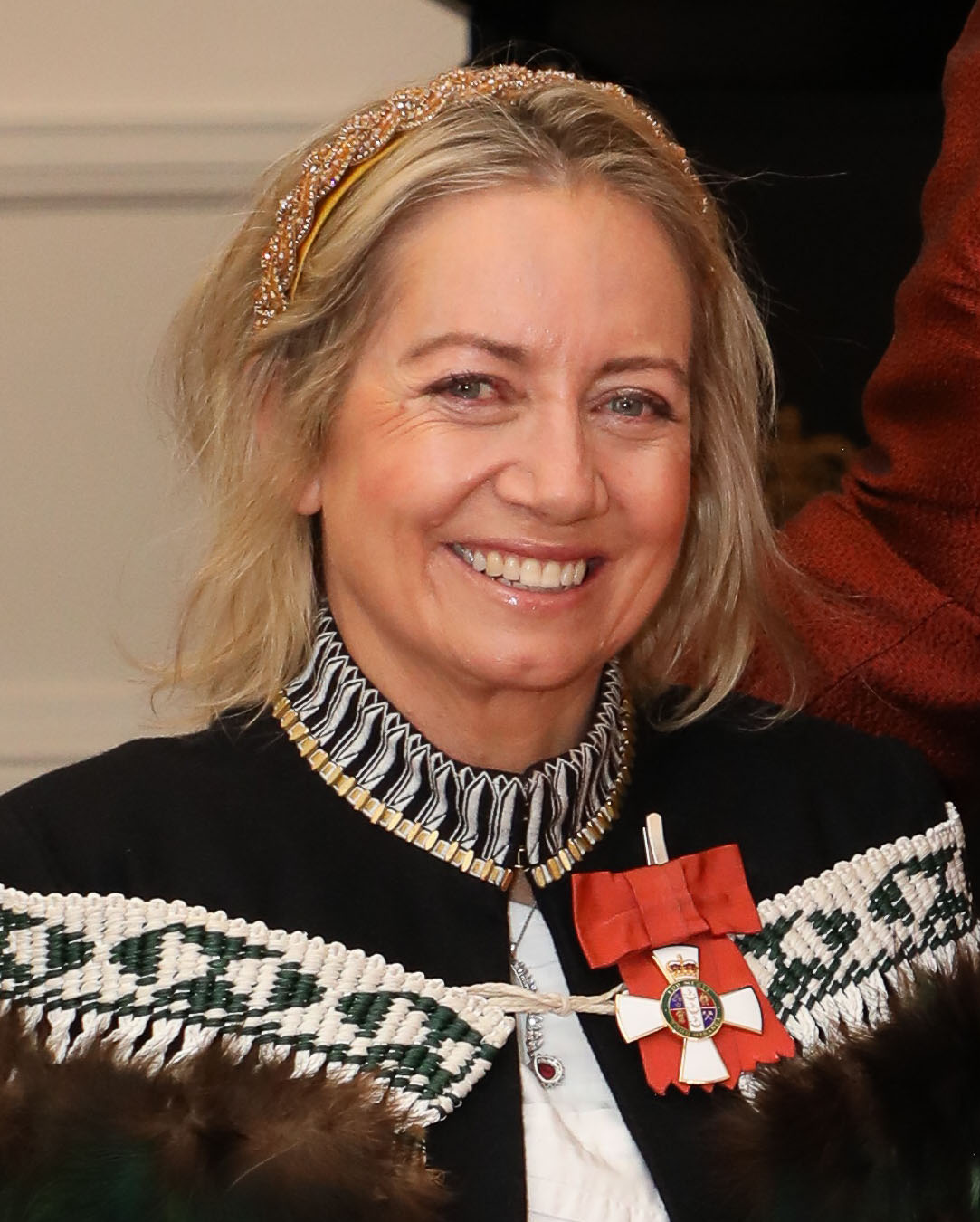
Dame Catriona Williams

=== Knight Companion (KNZM) ===
- The Honourable Mark Cooper KC – of Martinborough. For services to the judiciary.
- Brendan Jon Lindsay MNZM – of Auckland. For services to business and philanthropy.
- Ewan Francis Smith CNZM – of Rarotonga, Cook Islands. For services to Cook Islands business and tourism.
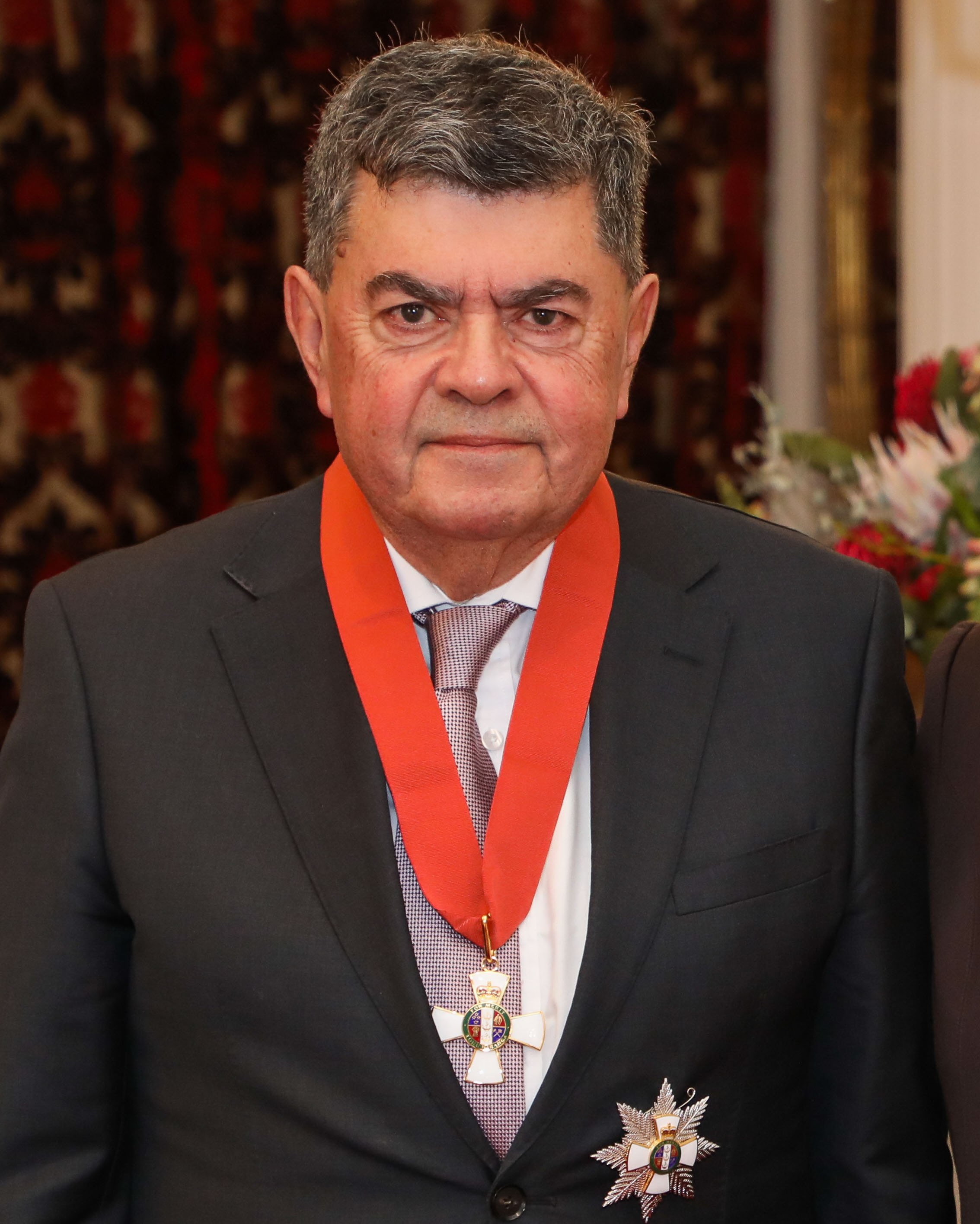
Sir Mark Cooper

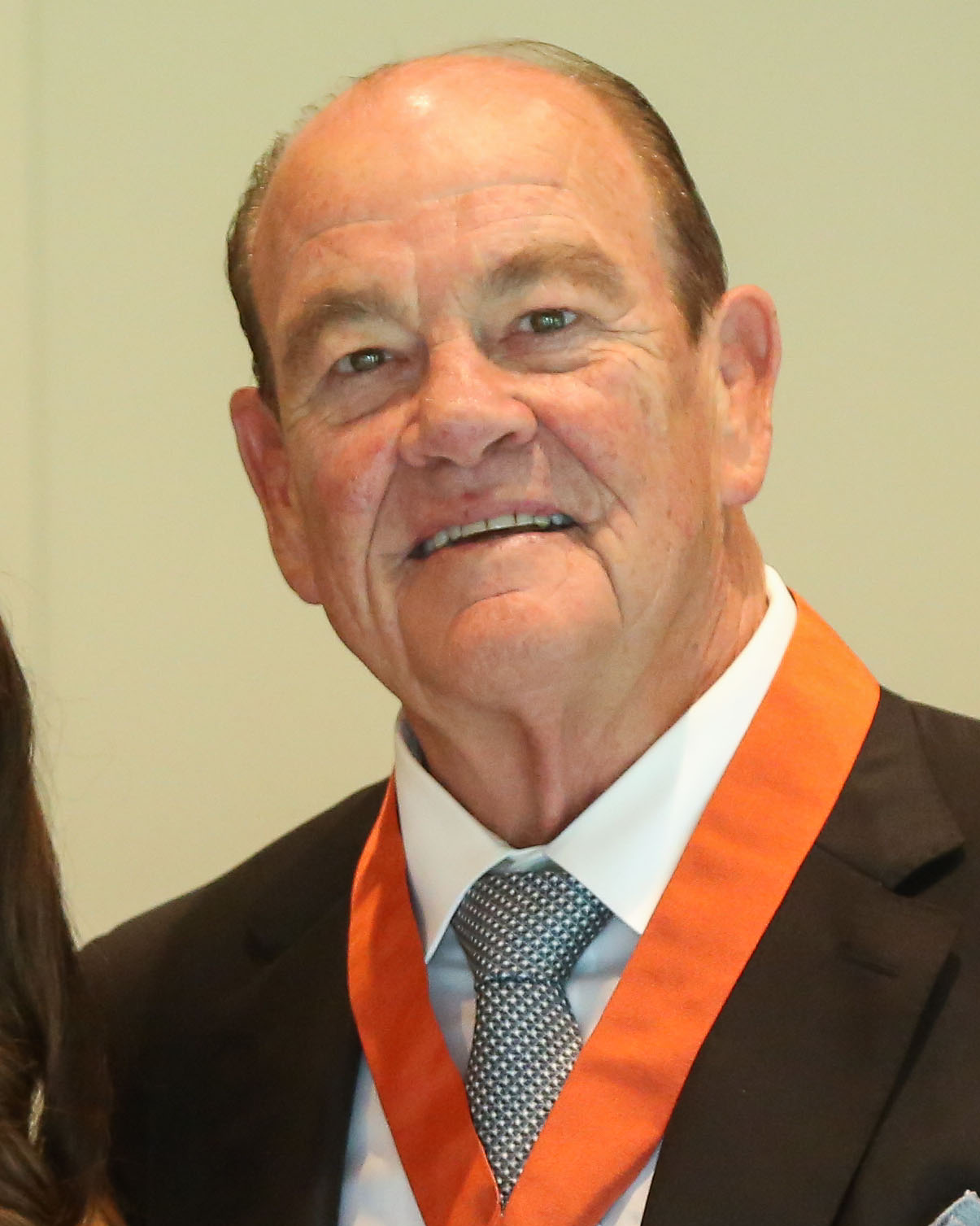
Sir Brendan Lindsay

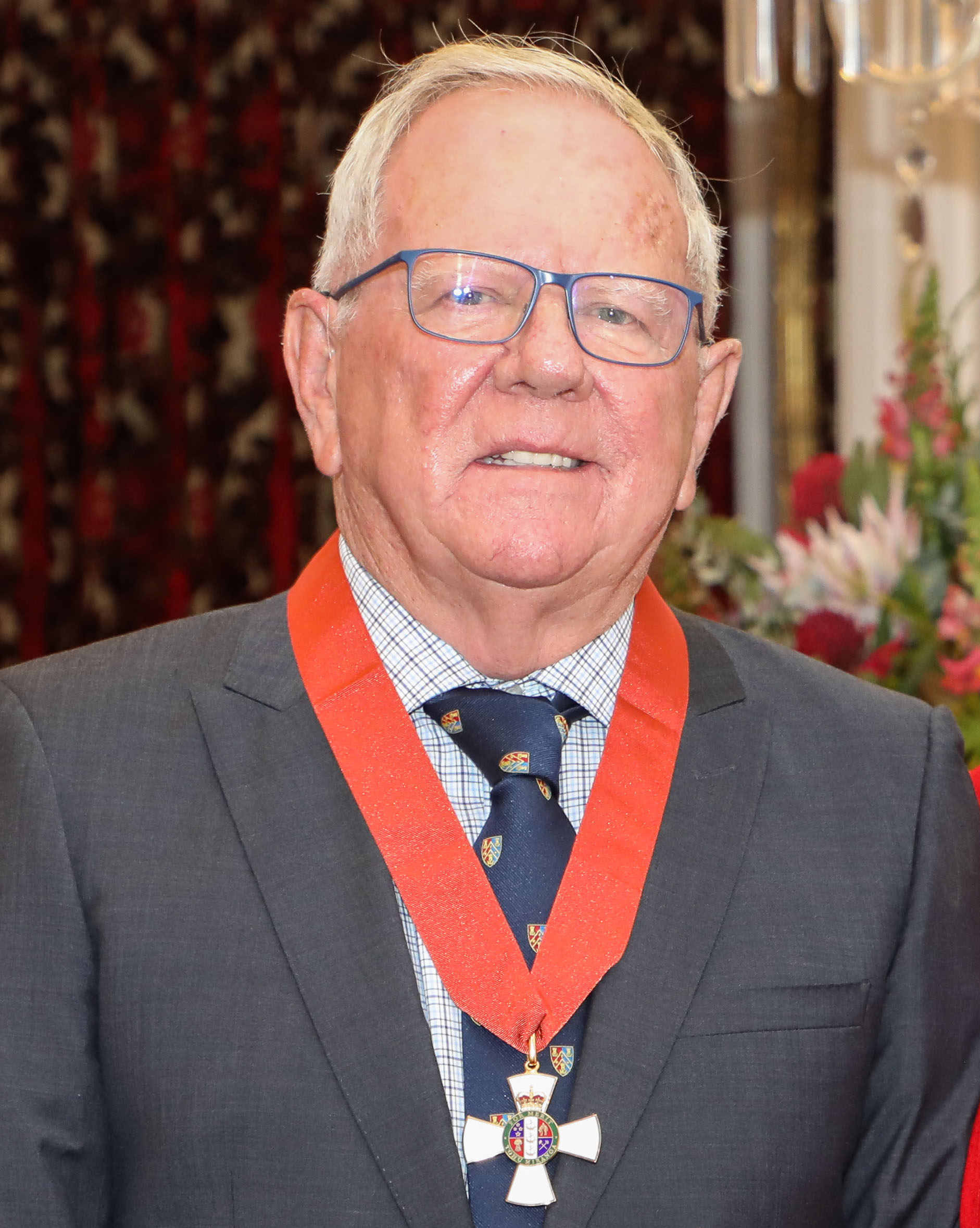
Sir Ewan Smith

=== Companion (CNZM) ===
- Catherine Joy Andersen – of Auckland. For services to the music industry.
- Wayne Robert Boyd – of Auckland. For services to business, philanthropy and sport.
- Professor George Charles Clifton – of Auckland. For services to structural engineering.
- Anthony Edwin Falkenstein ONZM – of Auckland. For services to philanthropy and business education.
- The Honourable Steven Leonard Joyce – of Albany. For services as a Member of Parliament.
- Donald Angus Mackinnon – of Auckland. For services to sports governance.
- Professor Emeritus Ian George (Joe) Mayhew – of Gisborne. For services to the veterinary profession, especially equine medicine.
- Dr David Edwin McKee – of Wellington. For services to New Zealand Sign Language and the deaf community.
- William Charles Nathan OBE ED – of Wellington. For services to Māori.
- Dr Lesley Kay Rameka – of Taupō. For services to Māori and early childhood education.
- The Honourable Ruth Margaret Richardson – of Christchurch. For services as a Member of Parliament and to governance.
- Dr Ai Ling Tan – of Auckland. For services to gynaecology.
- Dr Mark Greenslade Thomas – of Auckland. For services to people living with HIV/AIDS and antibiotic research.
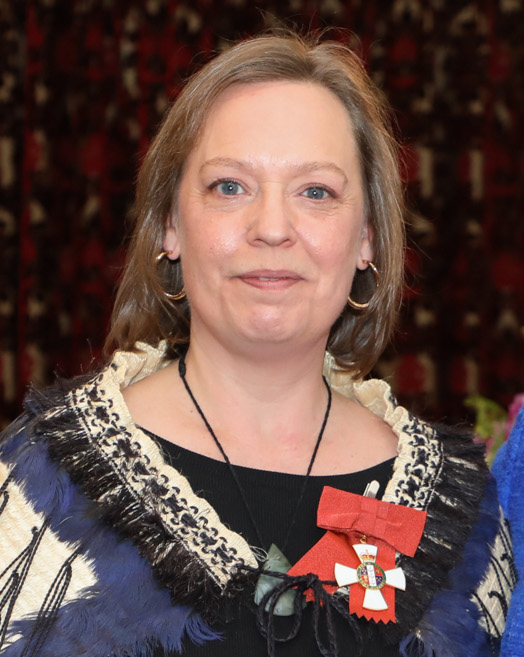
Cath Andersen

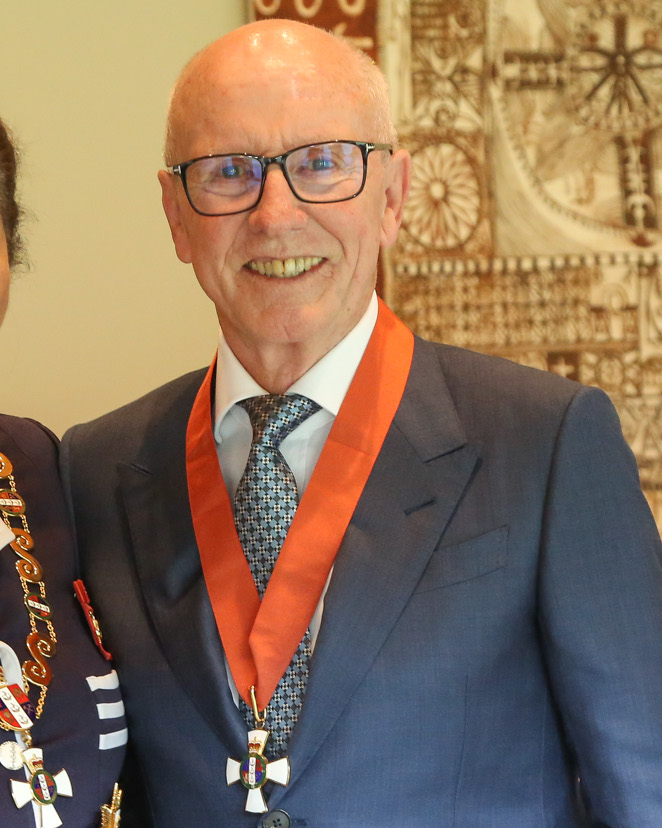
Wayne Boyd

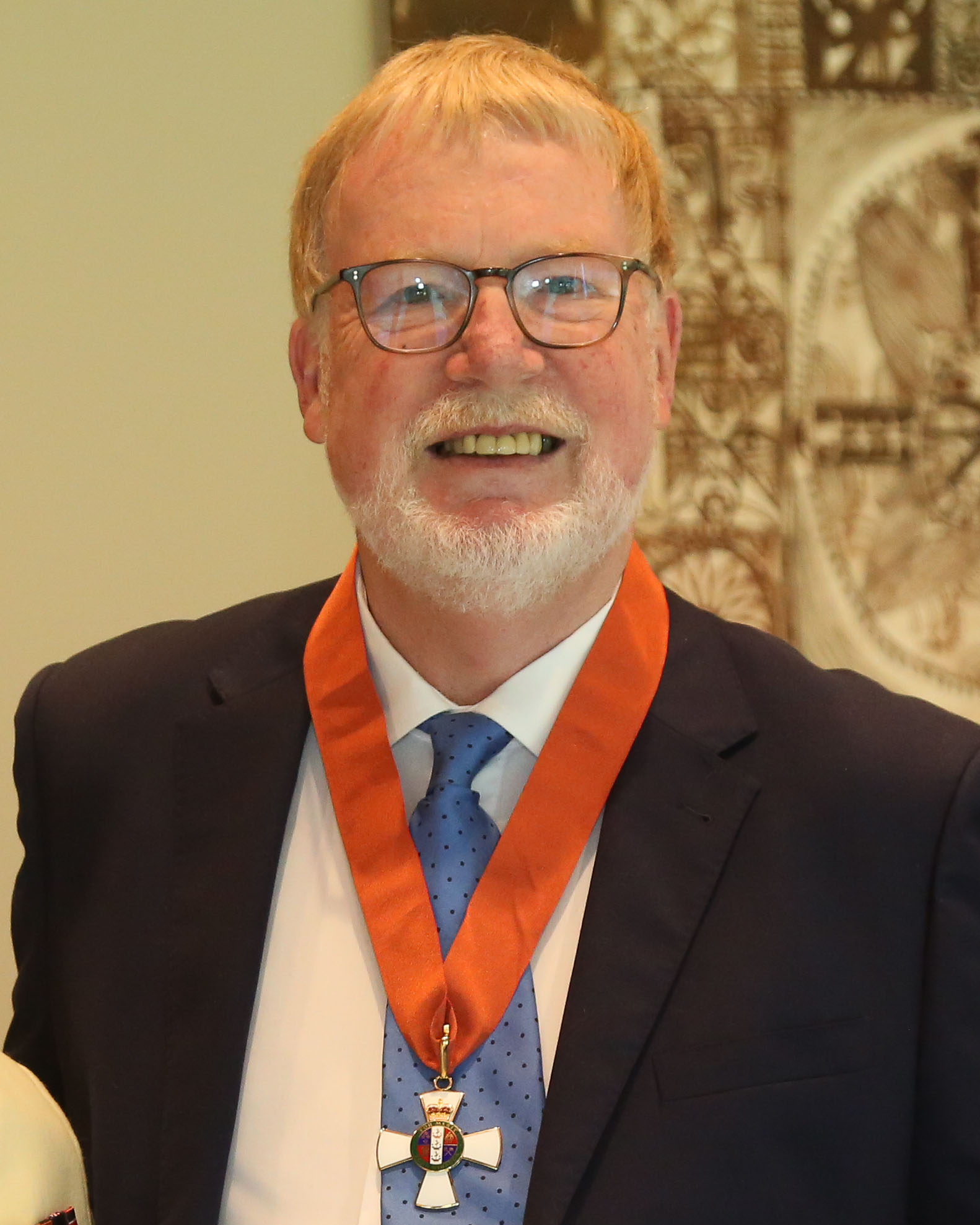
Charles Clifton

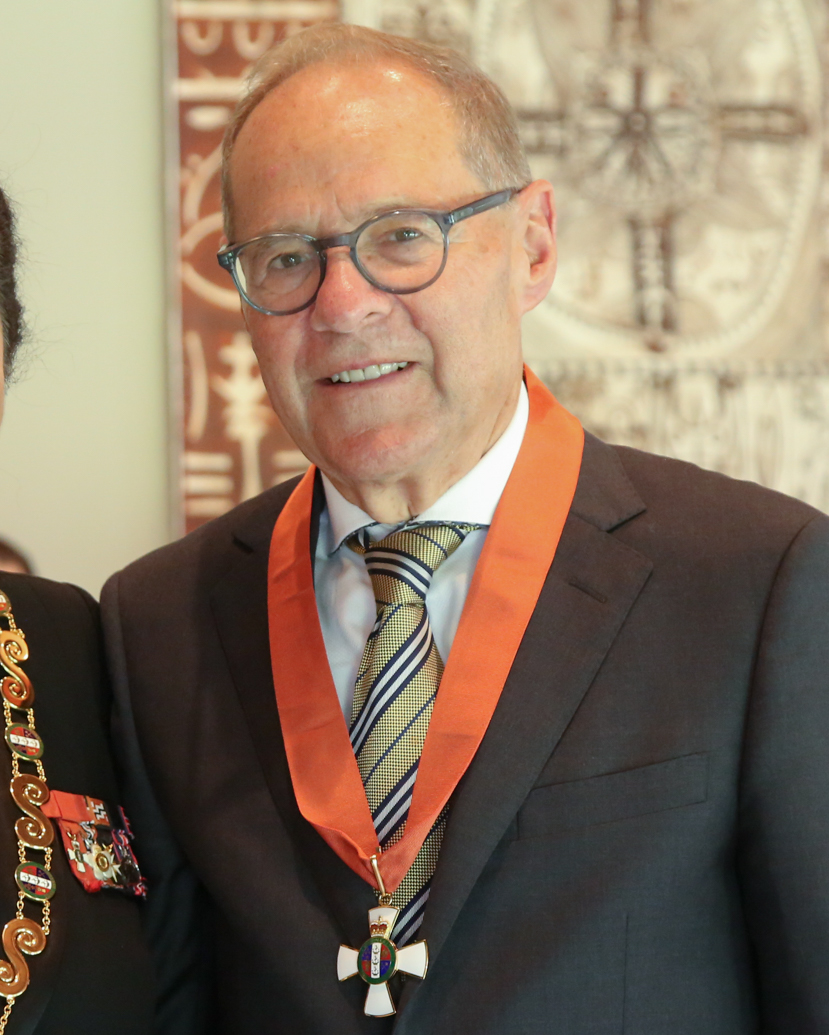
Tony Falkenstein

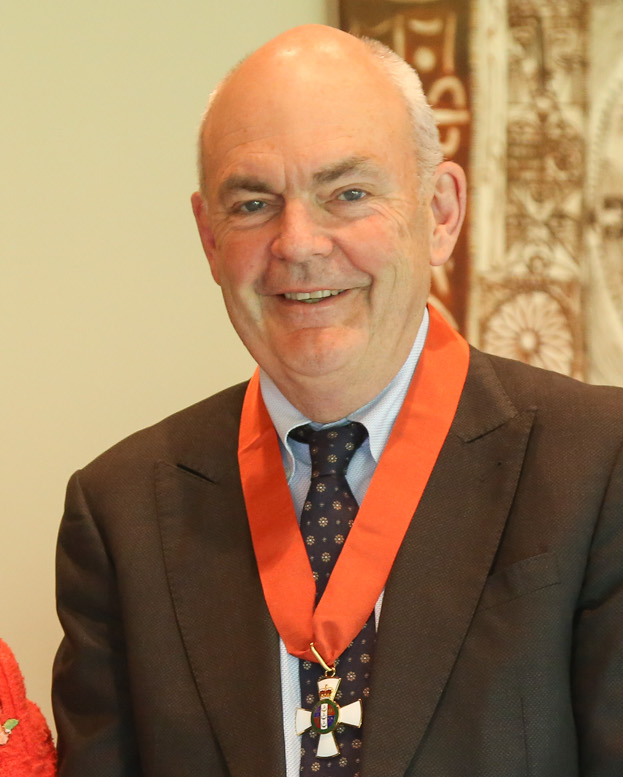
Steven Joyce

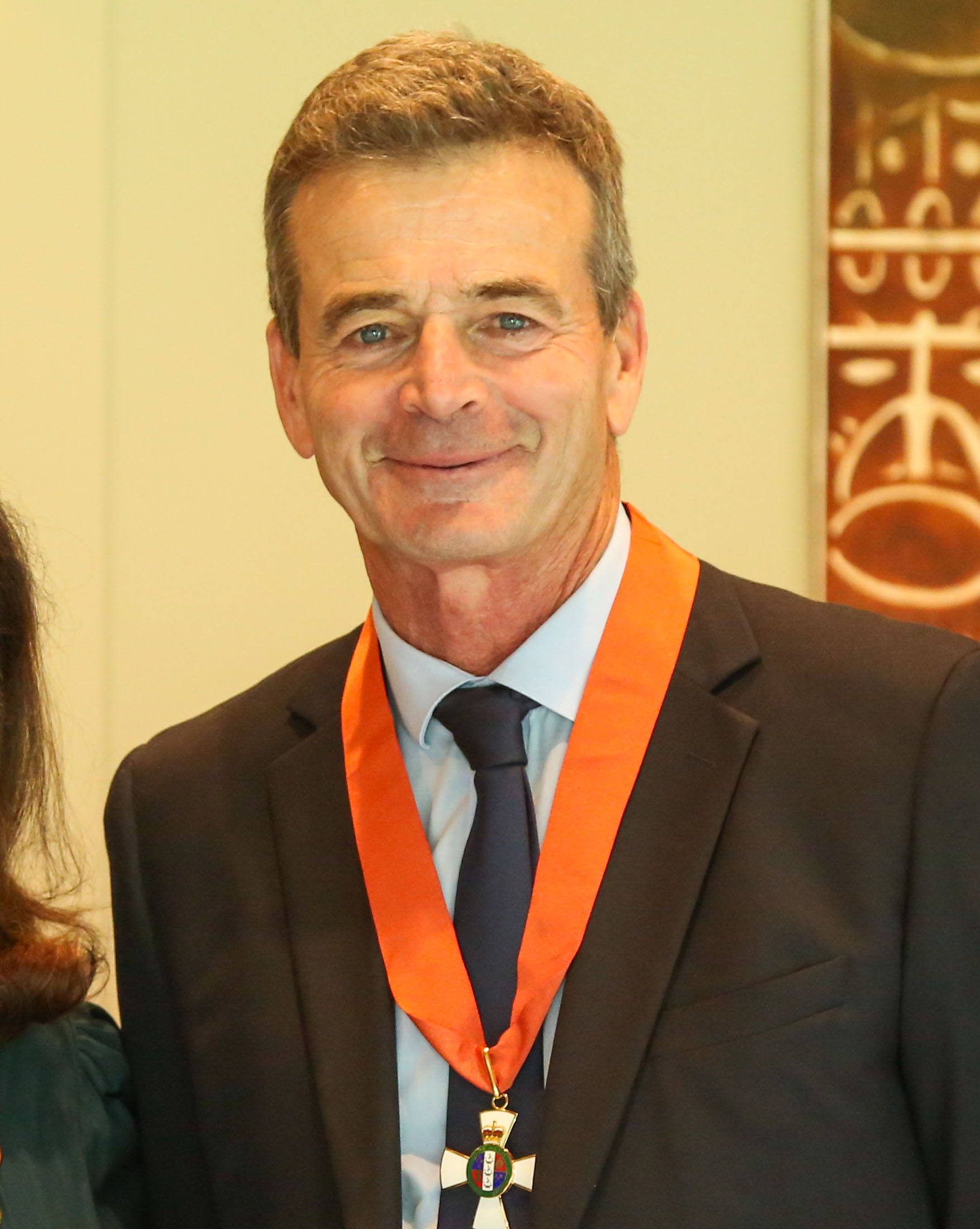
Don Mackinnon

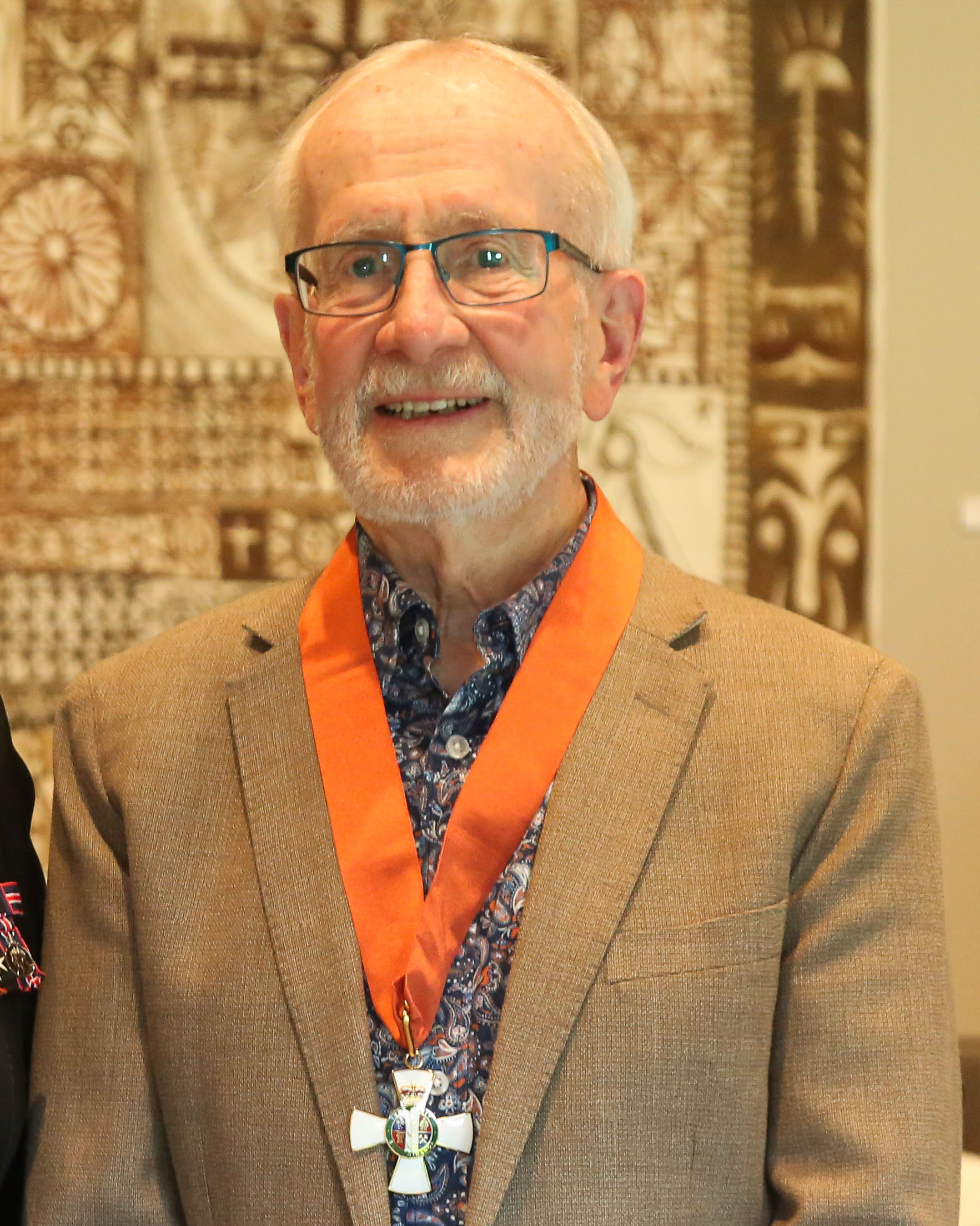
Joe Mayhew

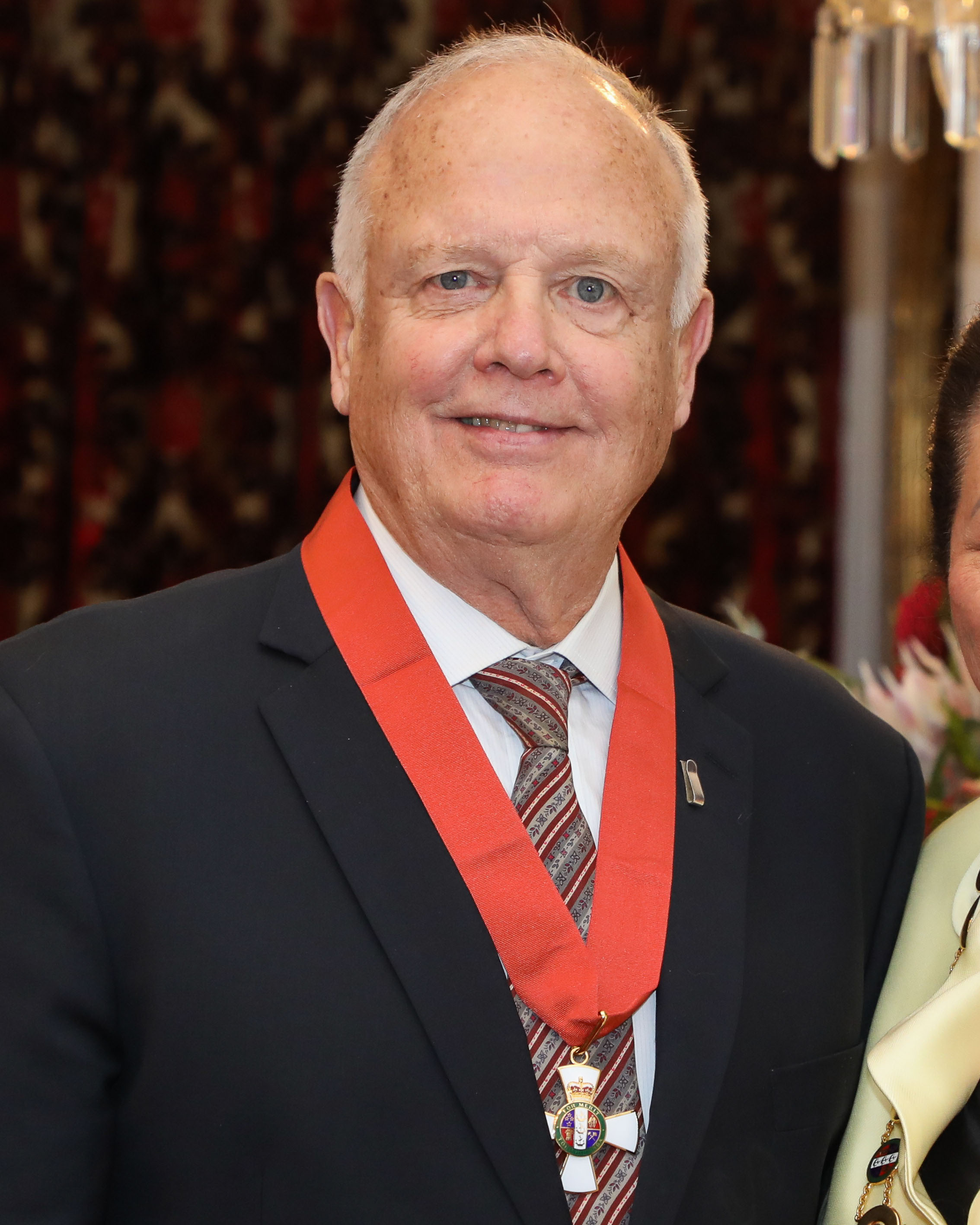
David McKee

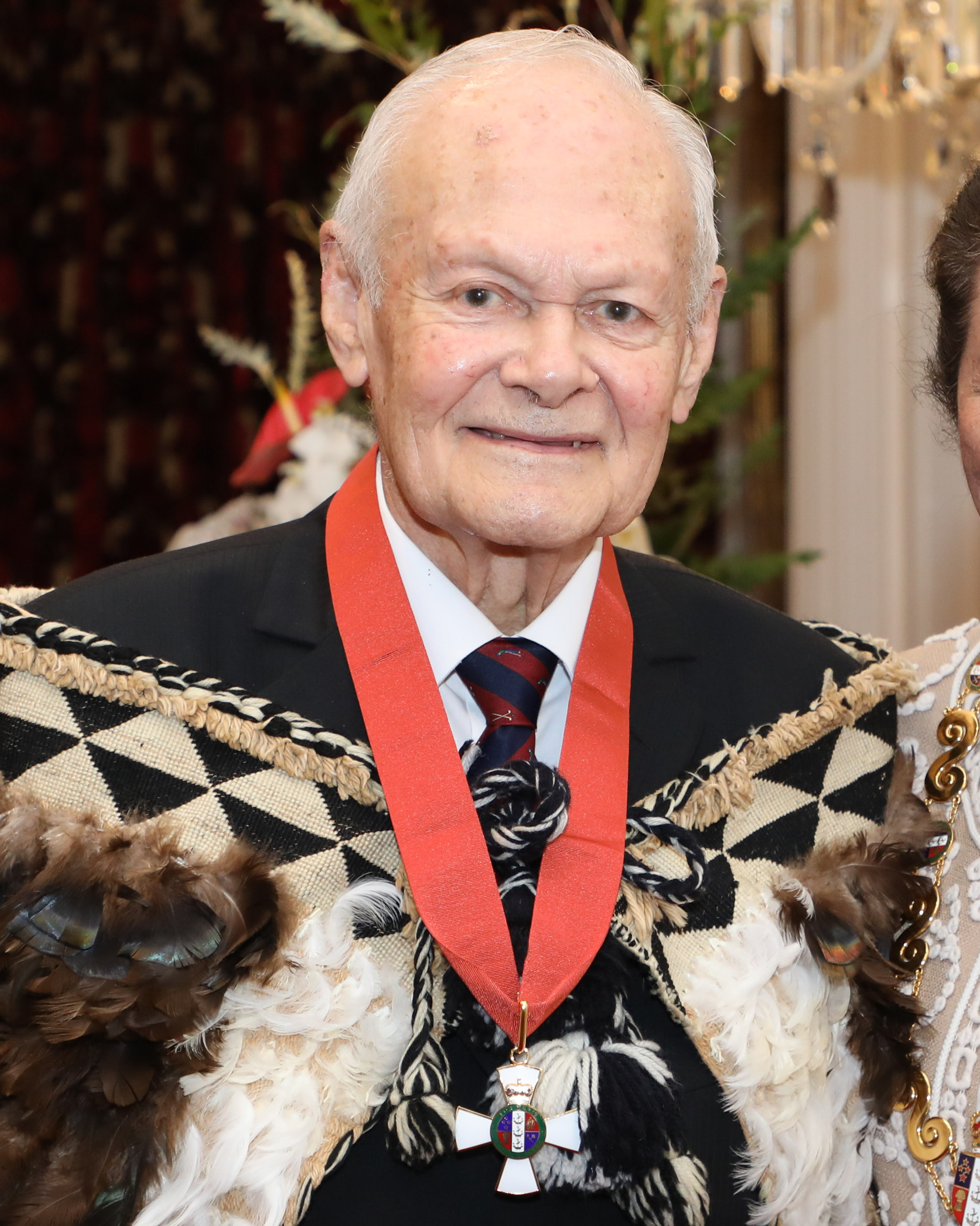
Bill Nathan

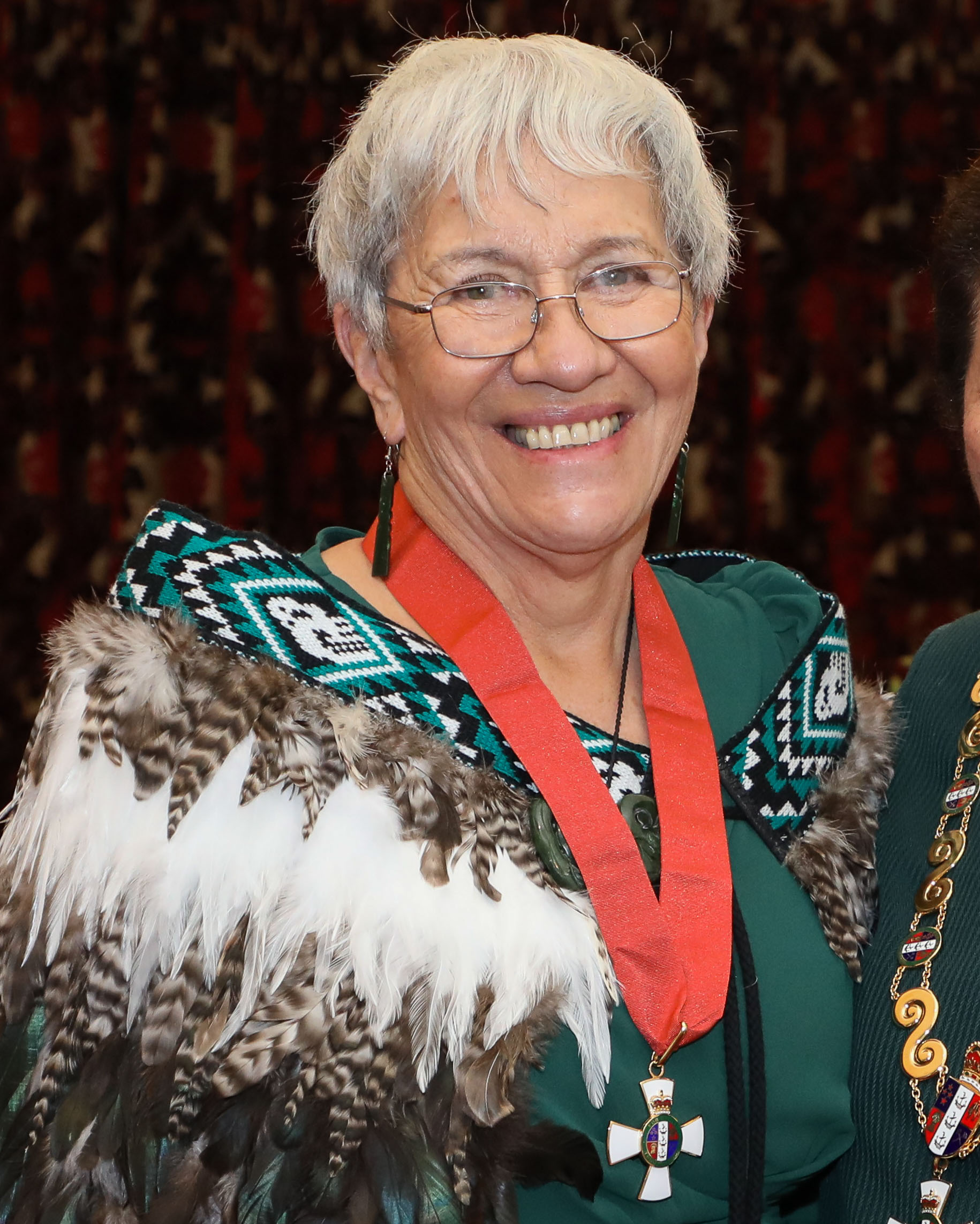
Lesley Rameka

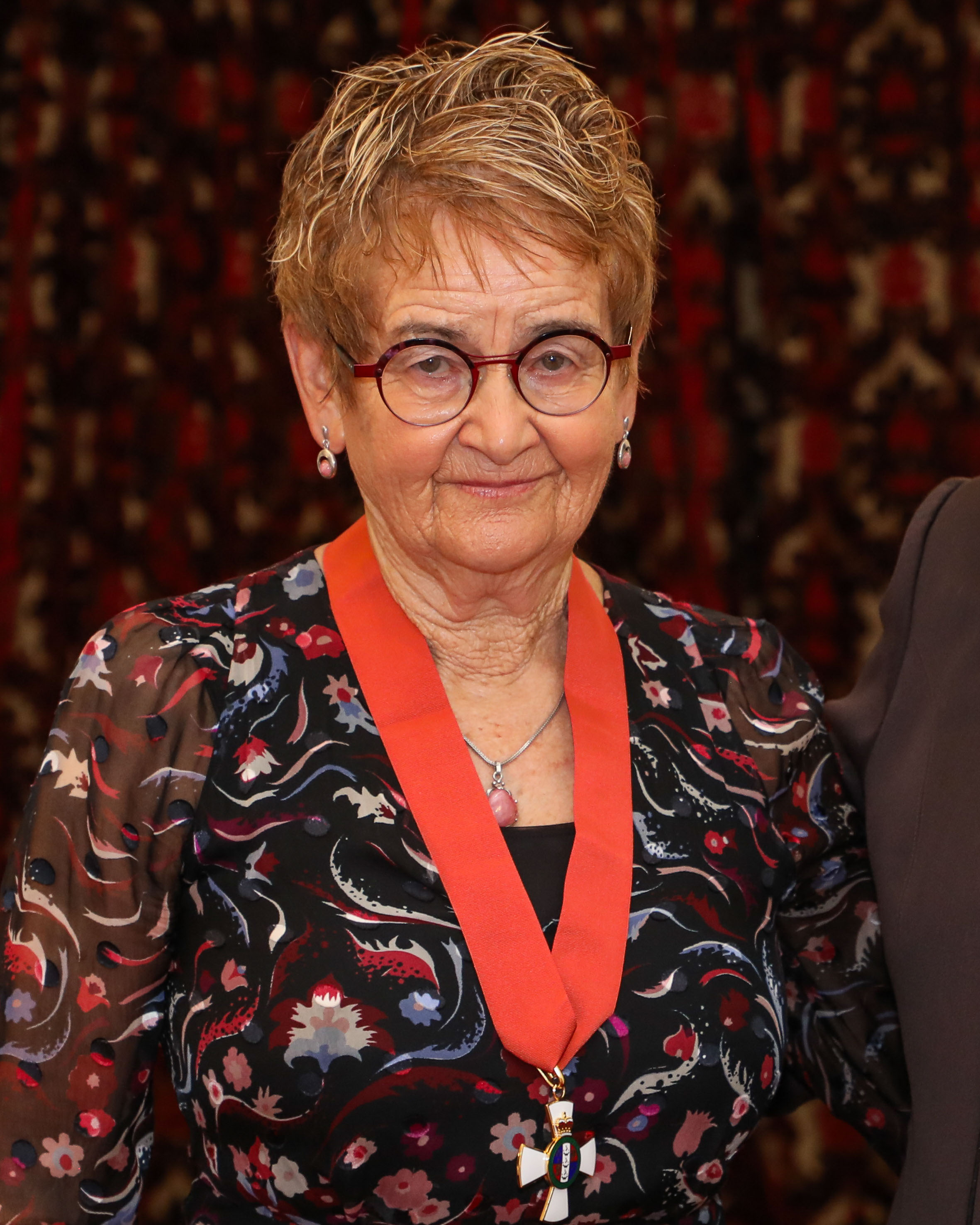
Ruth Richardson

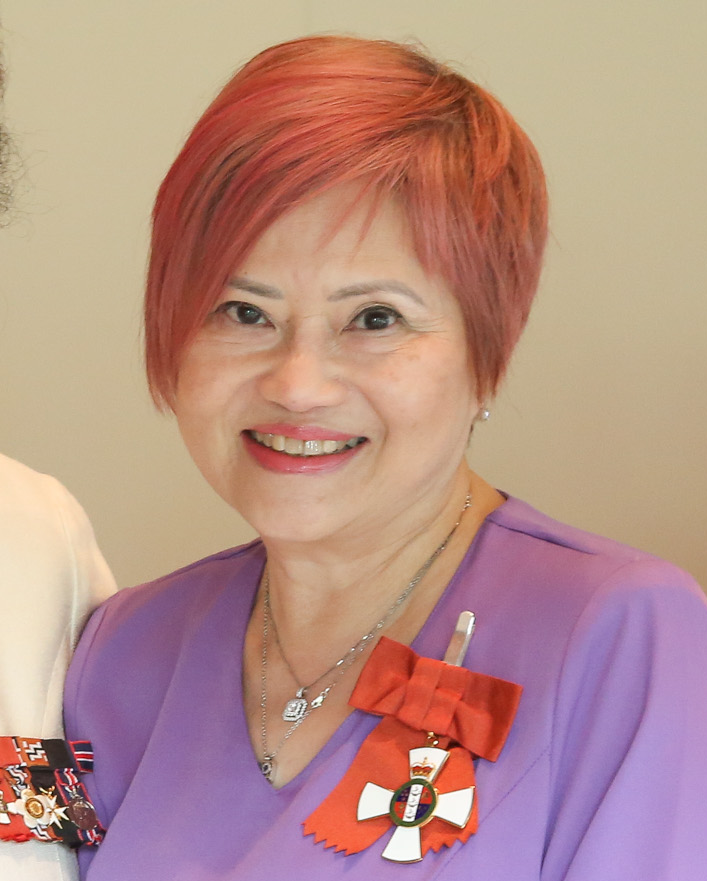
Ai Ling Tan

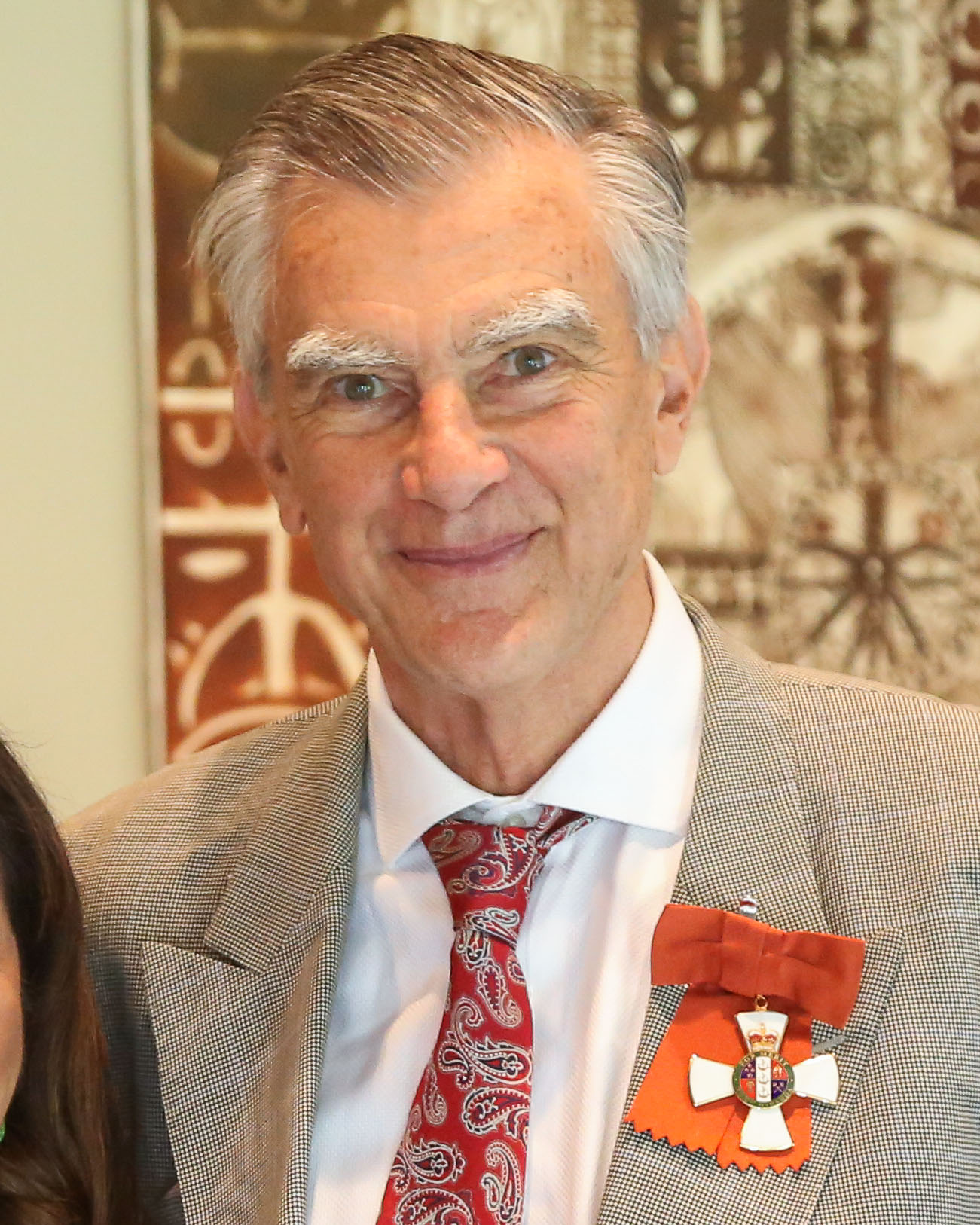
Mark Thomas

=== Officer (ONZM) ===
- Emeritus Professor George David Baxter – of Alexandra. For services to physiotherapy and health.
- Gillian Lorraine Bohm – of Wellington. For services to health.
- Associate Professor Philip Michel Jose Brinded – of Christchurch. For services to psychiatry.
- Fergus Graham Brown – of Waikanae. For services to the tourism industry.
- Graham Vincent Brown – of Rangiora. For services to the venison industry.
- David Paul Burton – of Wellington. For services to food writing.
- Peter Hardy Ballantyne Carty – of Tūrangi. For services to fly-fishing.
- Suzanne Noreen Cato – of Auckland. For services to music, television and education.
- Hohepa Conrad – of Kaitaia. For services to Māori, particularly kaupapa waka.
- Peter Michael de Blois – of Invercargill. For services to music.
- Dr Celia Jane Devenish Giddings – of Fairlie. For services to women's health and education.
- Sophie Frances Monique Devine – of Christchurch. For services to cricket.
- Judith Mary Dobson – of Auckland. For services to the community, broadcasting and historical preservation.
- Professor Bernadette Kathleen Drummond – of Dunedin. For services to dentistry and education.
- Daryl Kelvin Eason – of Nelson. For services to wildlife conservation.
- Susan Elizabeth Elliott – of Ōtaki. For services to the arts and governance.
- Rear Admiral James Leslie Gilmour (Rtd) – of Collingwood. For services to the New Zealand Defence Force.
- Kirk Brian Hardy – of Auckland. For services to drug abuse prevention and education.
- Dafydd (Dai) Morgan Henwood – of Auckland. For services to the entertainment industry and charitable fundraising.
- Professor Patria Anne Hume – of Auckland. For services to sports science and injury prevention.
- Gary Rodney Lane – of Auckland. For services to conservation and philanthropy.
- Julia May Marshall – of Waikanae. For services to children's literature.
- Peter David Martin JP – of Auckland. For services to the community, particularly Pacific and LGBTQ+ communities.
- Murray Graham Mexted – of Mount Maunganui. For services to rugby.
- David Ross Morgan – of Auckland. For services to aviation.
- Panchanatham Narayanan QSM JP – of Upper Hutt. For services to multicultural communities.
- Peter Arnold Nation – of Hamilton. For services to the agricultural industry and governance.
- Gillian Christine Naylor – of Alexandra. For services to rural communities, particularly women.
- John Daniel O'Sullivan – of Havelock North. For services to business and philanthropy.
- Dr Fiona Dorothy Pardington MNZM – of Waimate. For services to photography.
- Dr Susan Parry – of Auckland. For services to gastroenterology.
- David Robert Percy – of Wellington. For services to fire safety technologies, business and the community.
- Eric Clive Power – of Pleasant Point. For services to swimming.
- Timothy Grant Southee – of Hamilton. For services to cricket.
- Gail Patricia Spence – of Napier. For services to language education.
- Distinguished Professor Emeritus Paul Spoonley – of Auckland. For services to sociology.
- John Bradley Struthers – of Auckland. For services to cycling, the cycling industry and business.
- Mark William Joseph Vela – of Auckland. For services to mental healthcare and education.
- Jennifer Mary Wake – of Napier. For services to theatre and television.
- Neil William Walker JP – of Hāwera. For services to primary industries and the community.
- Sarah Louise Walker – of Cambridge. For services to BMX and sports governance.
- Dr Richard John Wild – of Christchurch. For services to animal welfare and the veterinary sector.
- Portia Louise Woodman-Wickliffe – of Mount Maunganui. For services to rugby.
- Wayne Wright – of Ōmokoroa. For services to education and philanthropy.
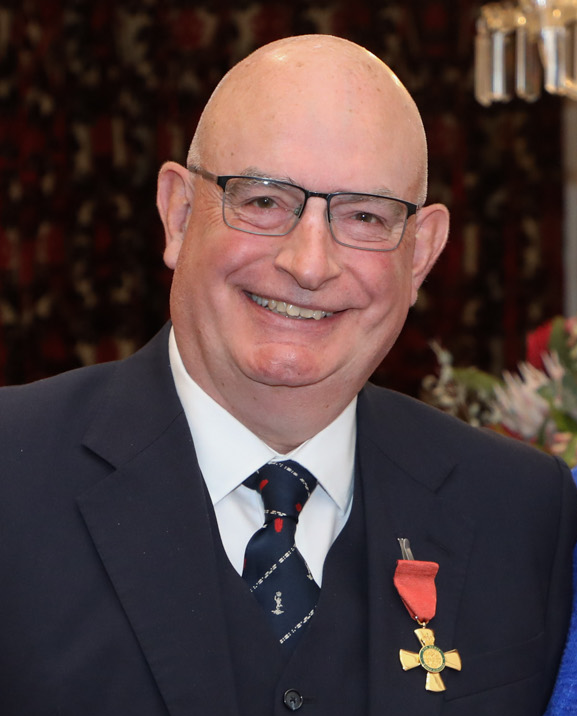
David Baxter

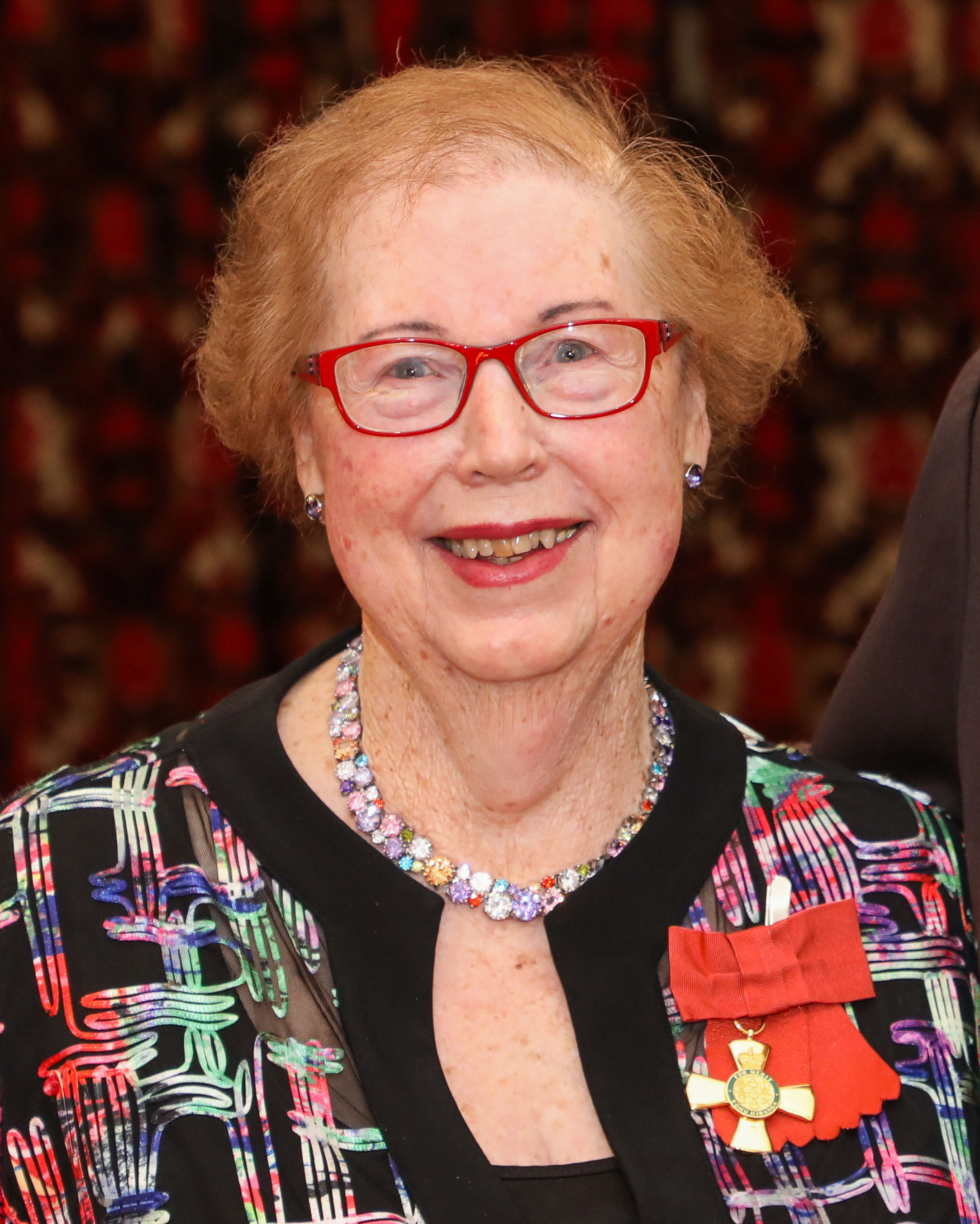
Gillian Bohm

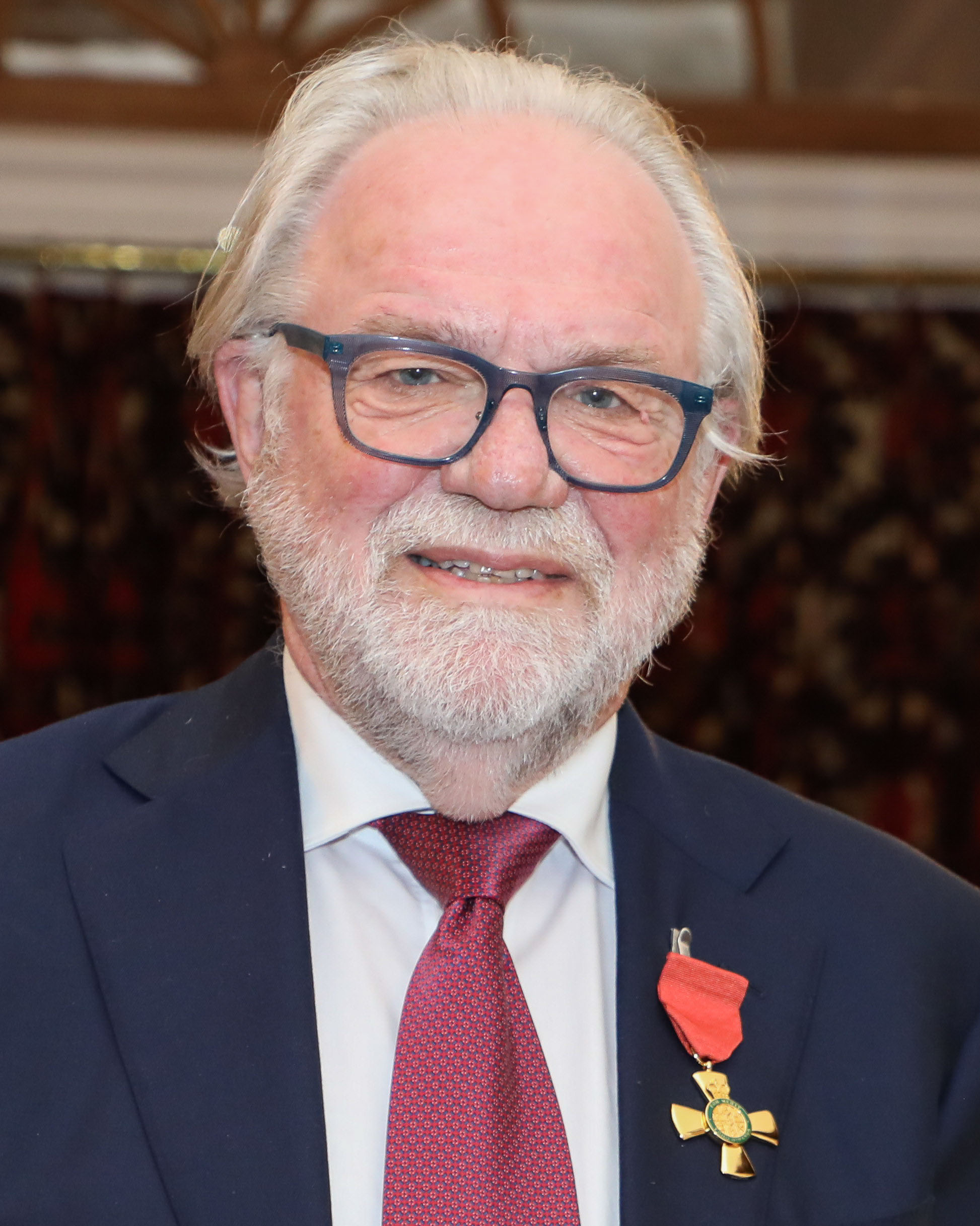
Phil Brinded

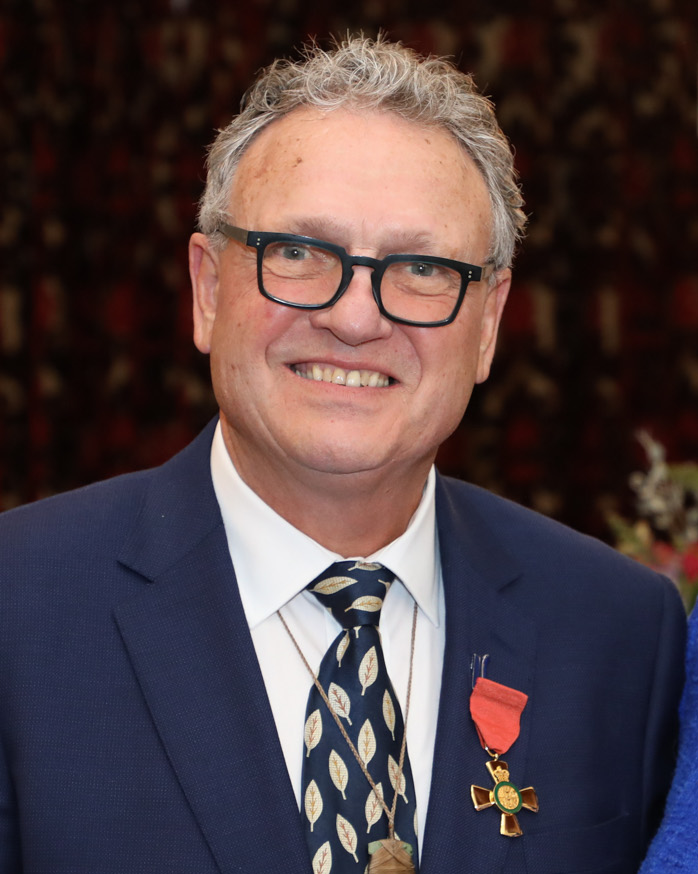
Fergus Brown

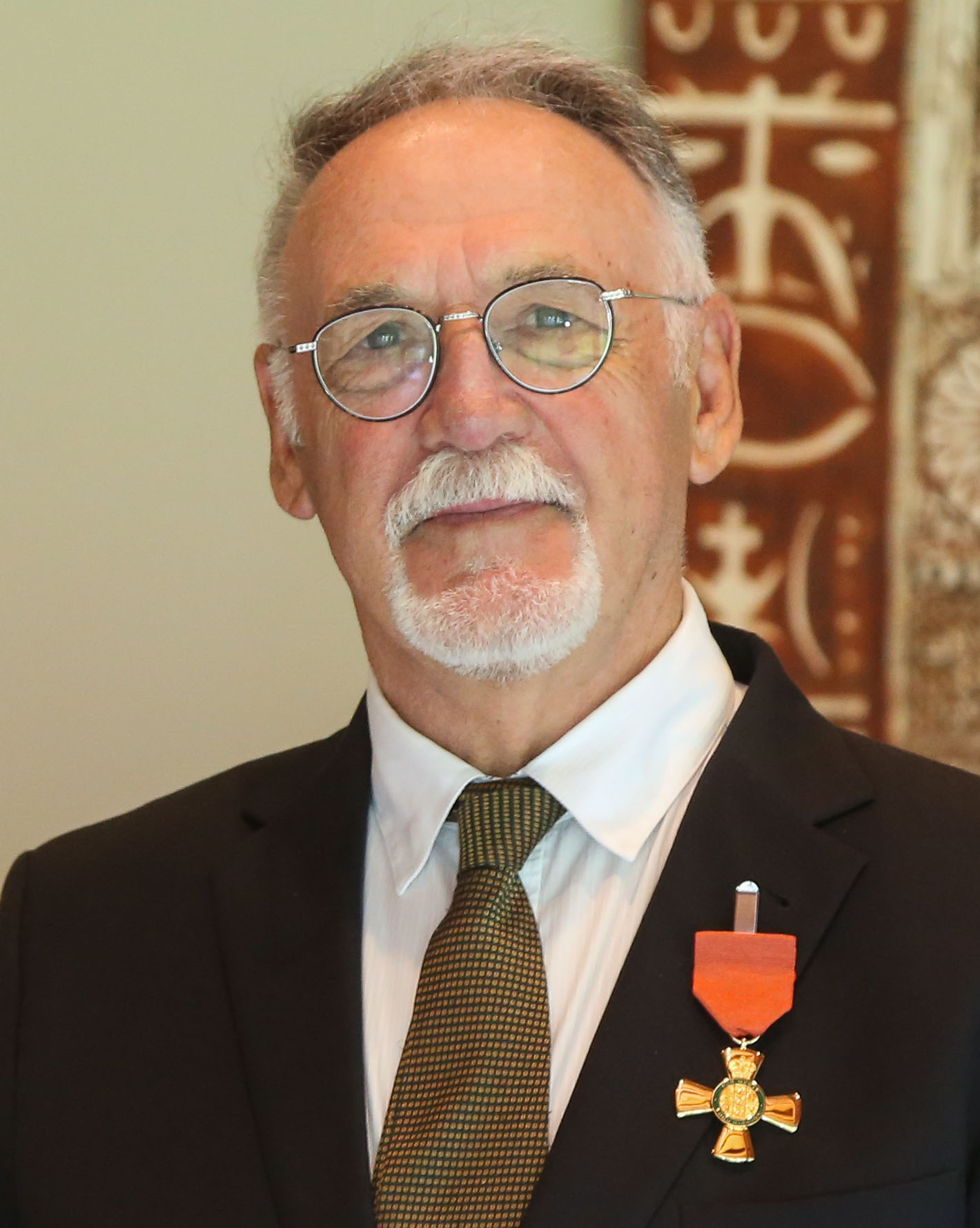
Graham Brown

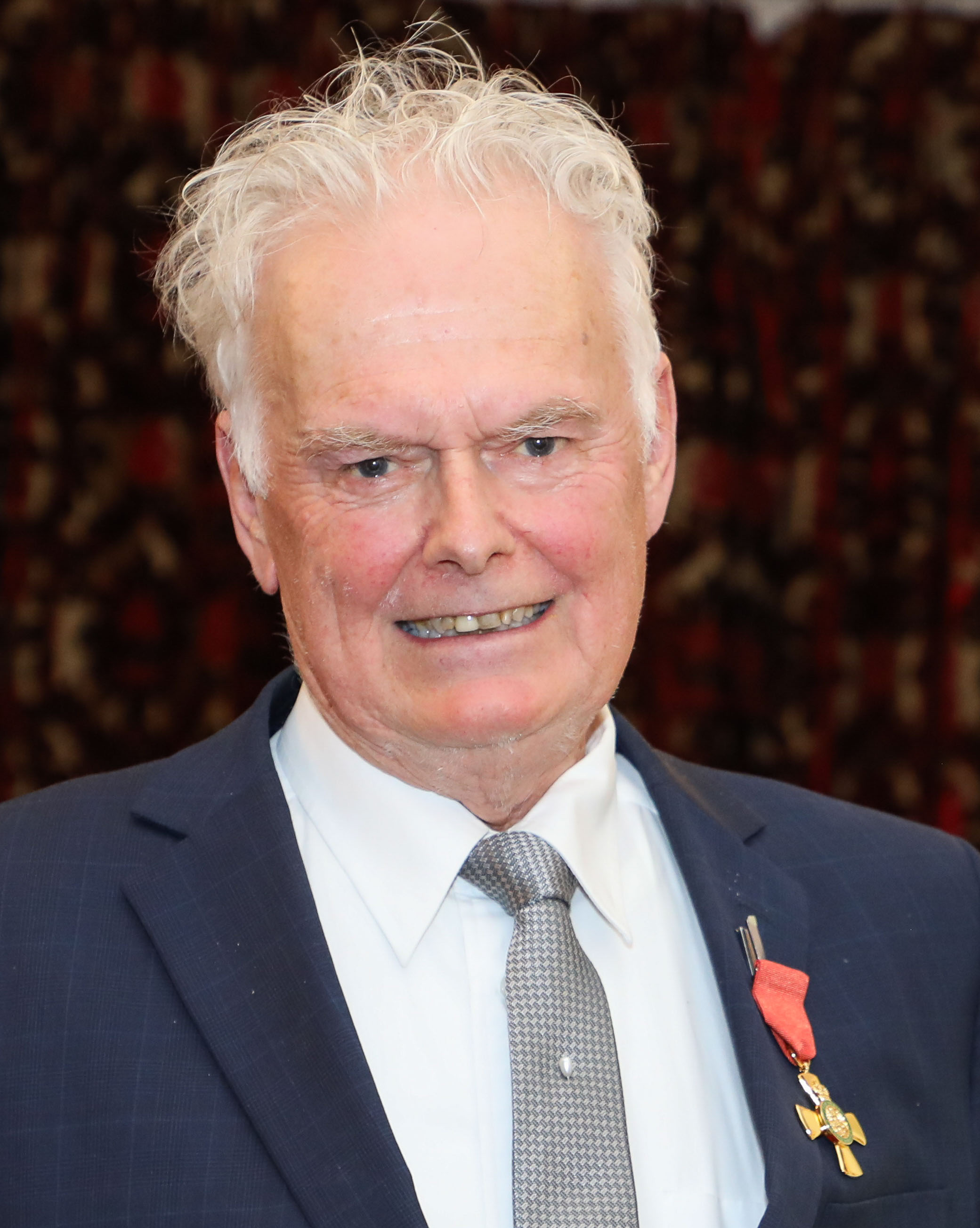
David Burton

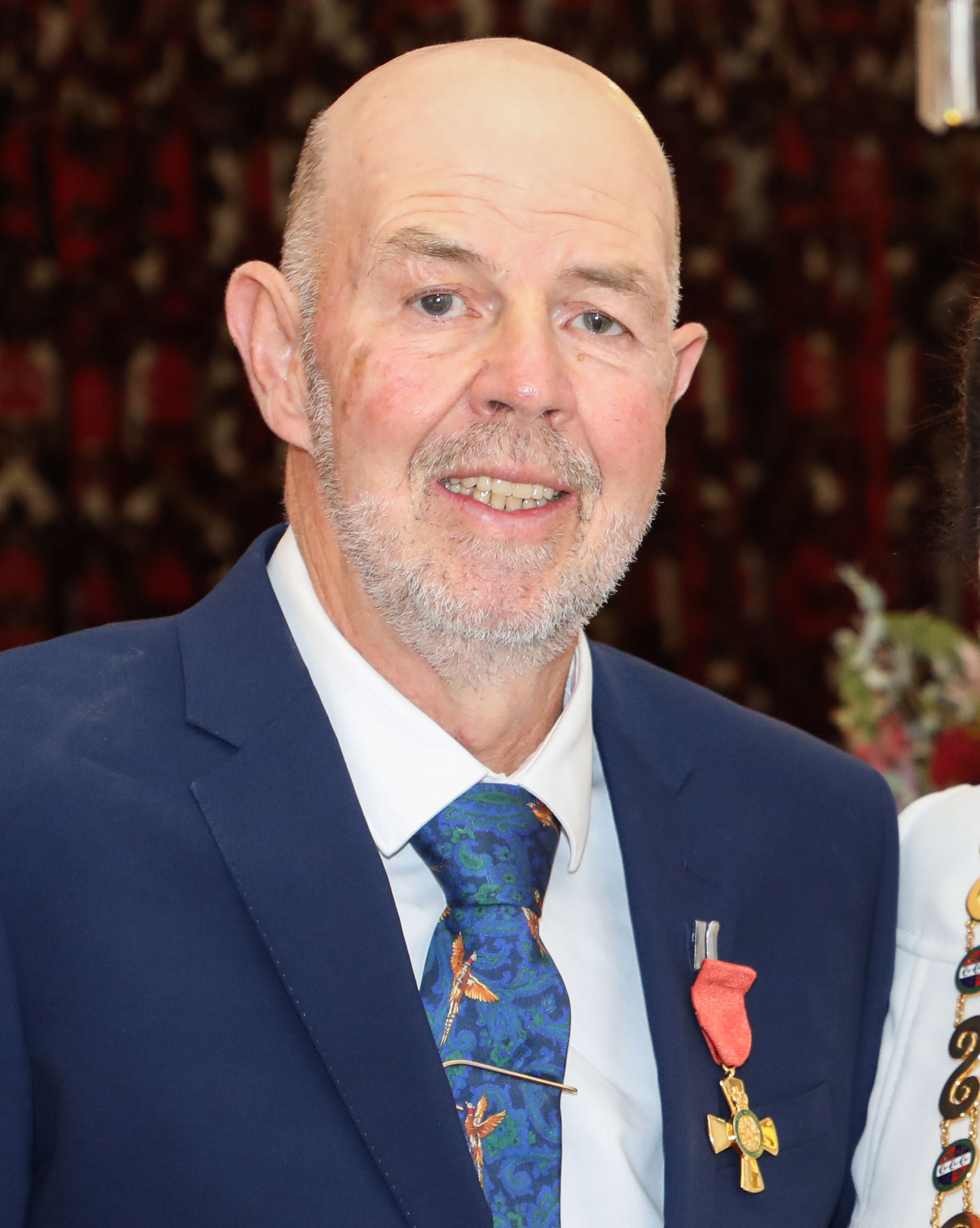
Peter Carty

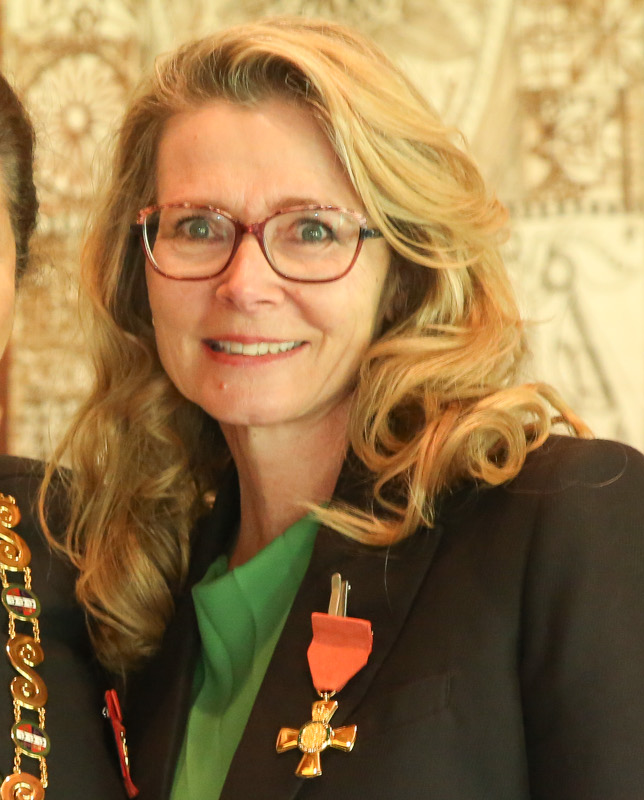
Suzy Cato

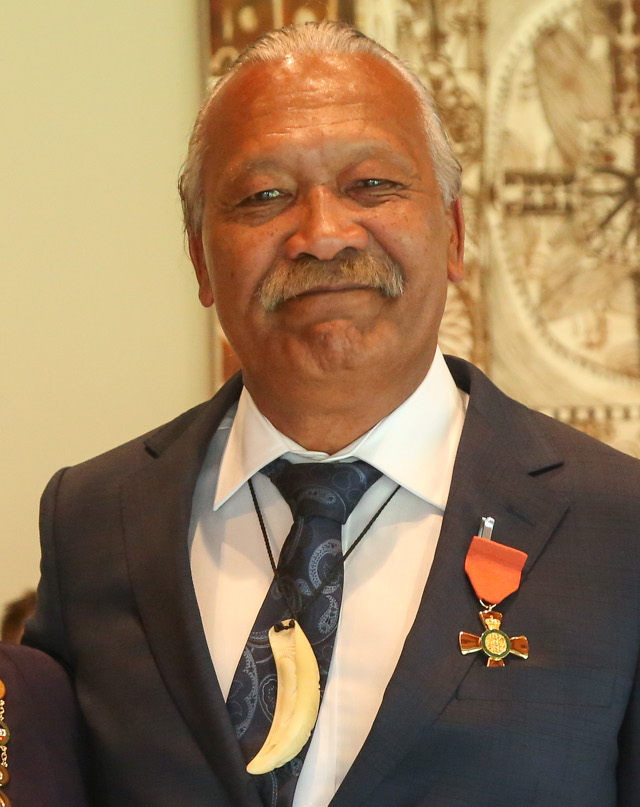
Joe Conrad

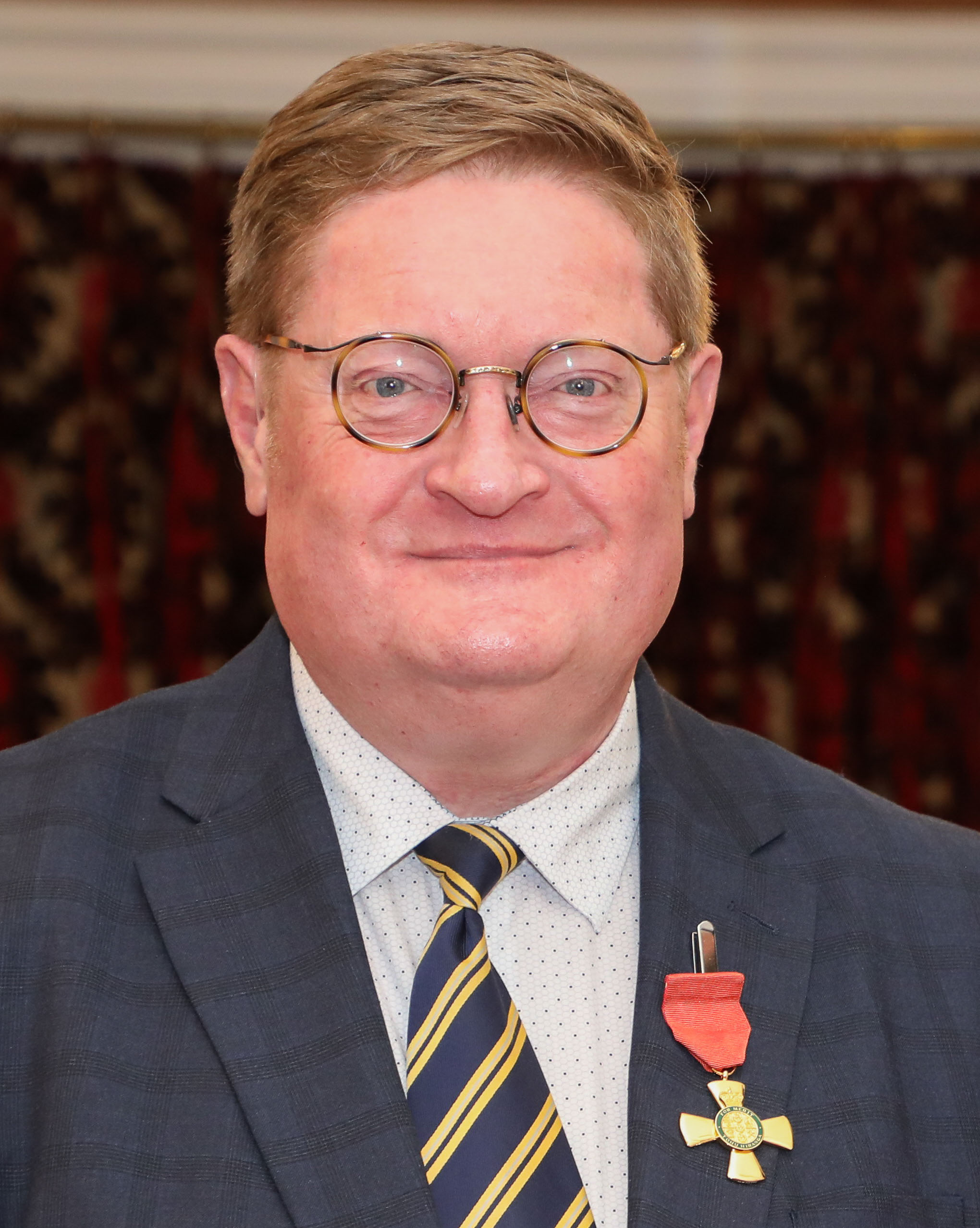
Peter de Blois

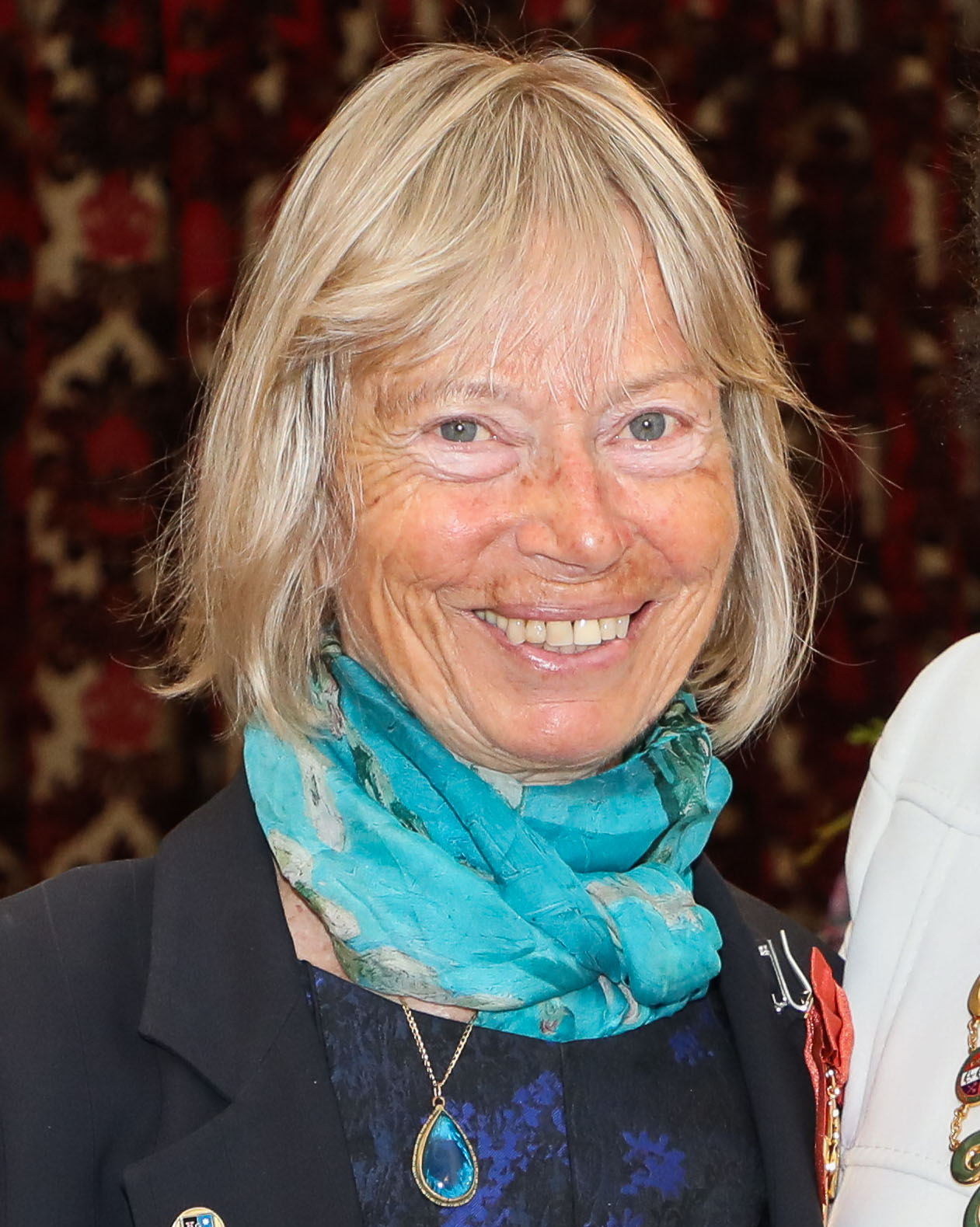
Celia Devenish

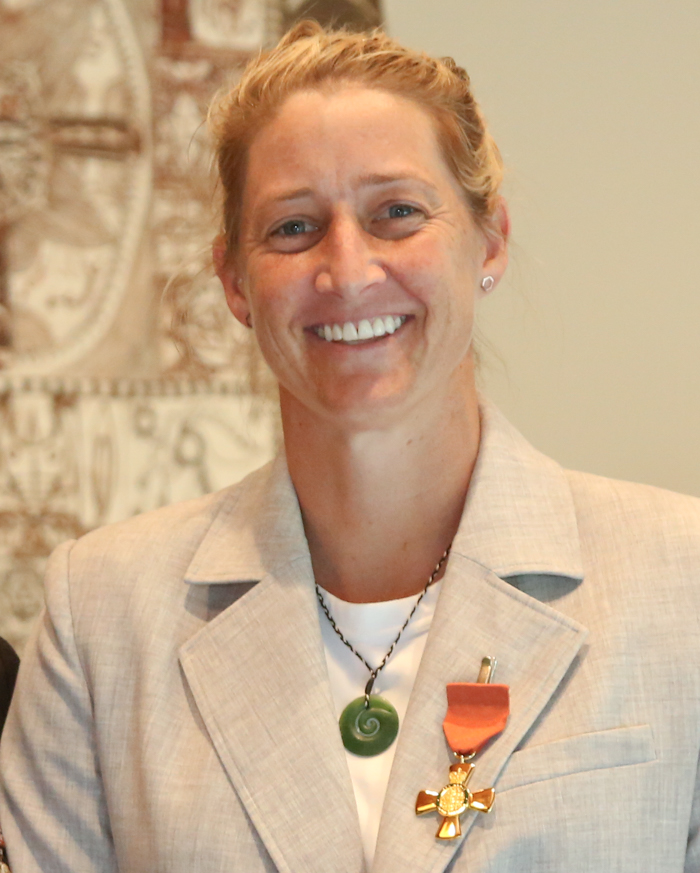
Sophie Devine

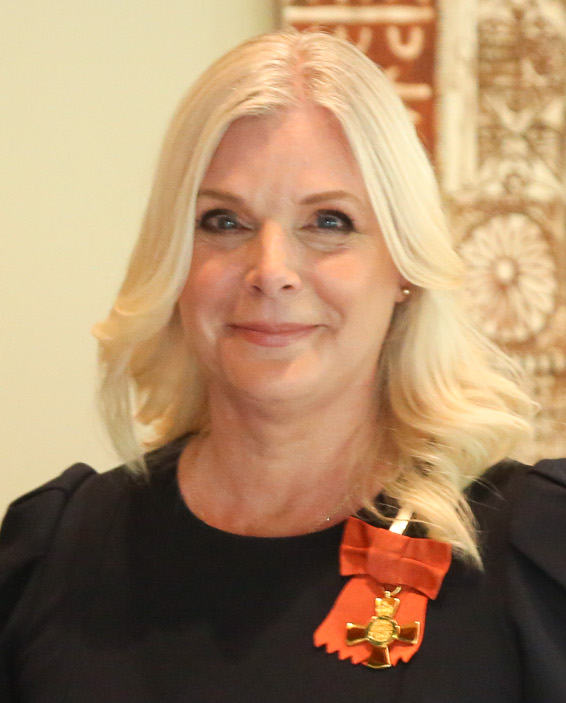
Jude Dobson

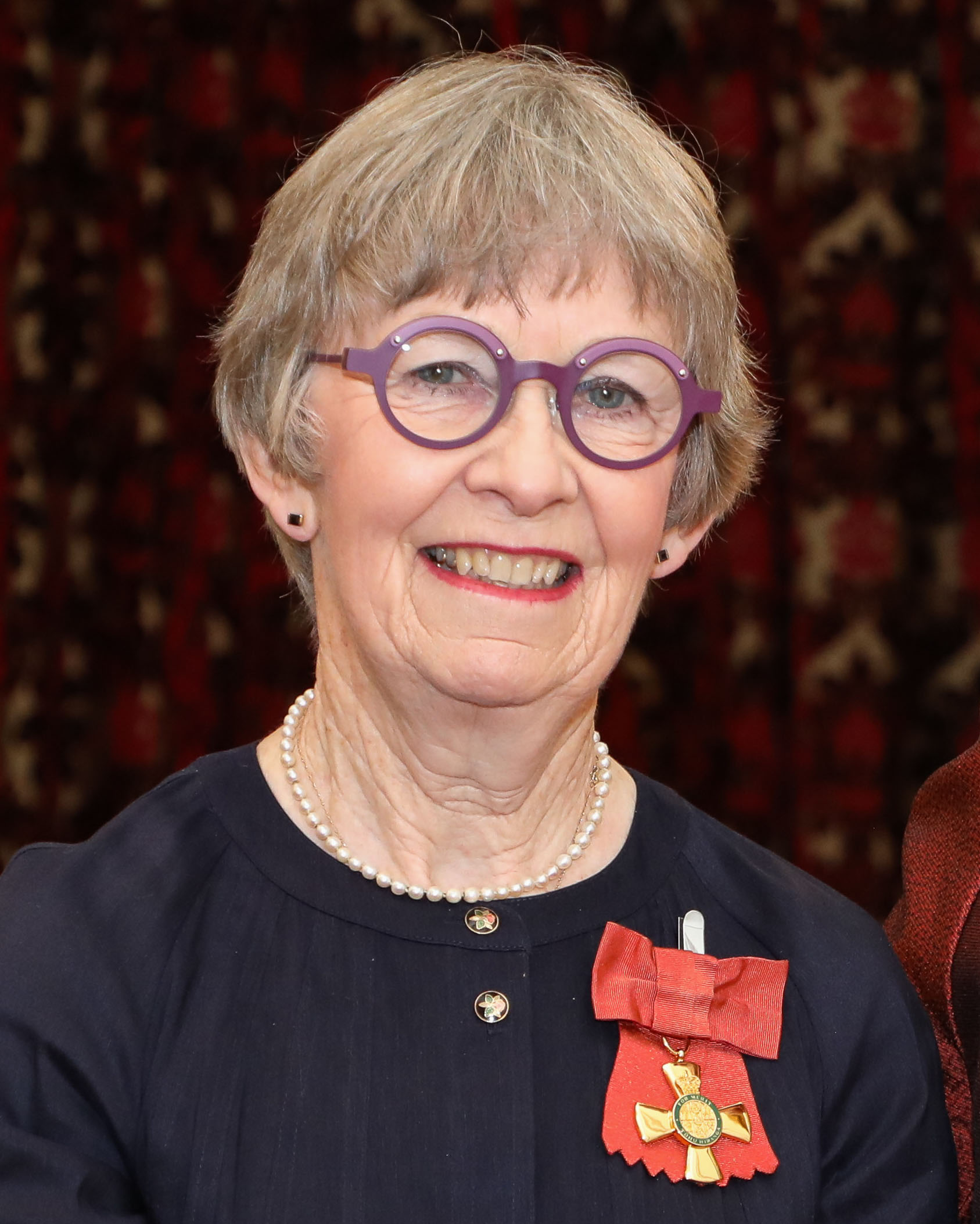
Bernadette Drummond

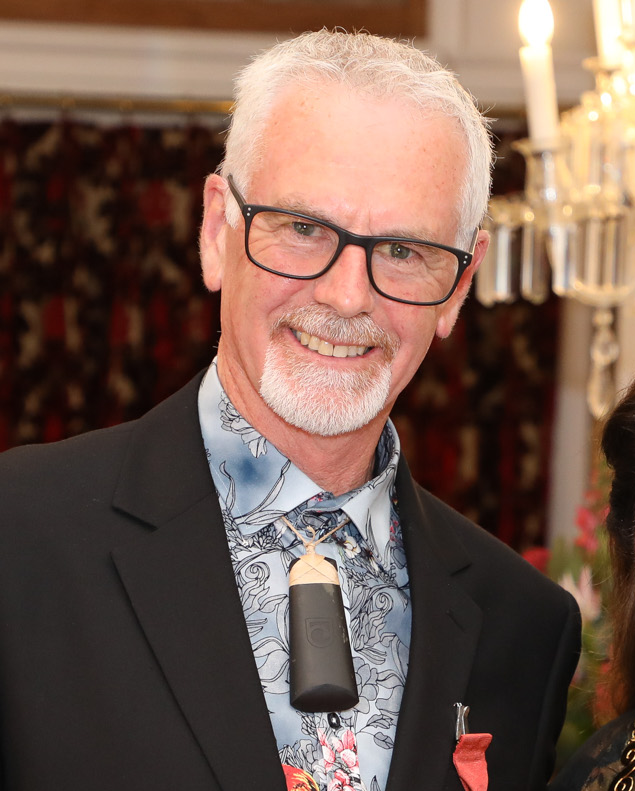
Daryl Eason

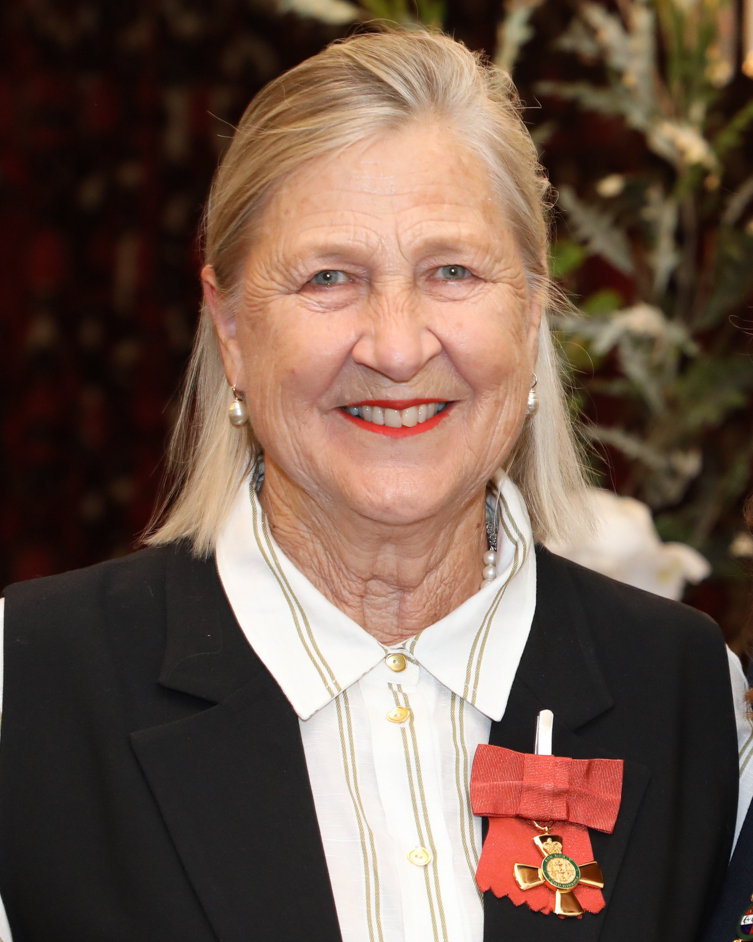
Sue Elliott

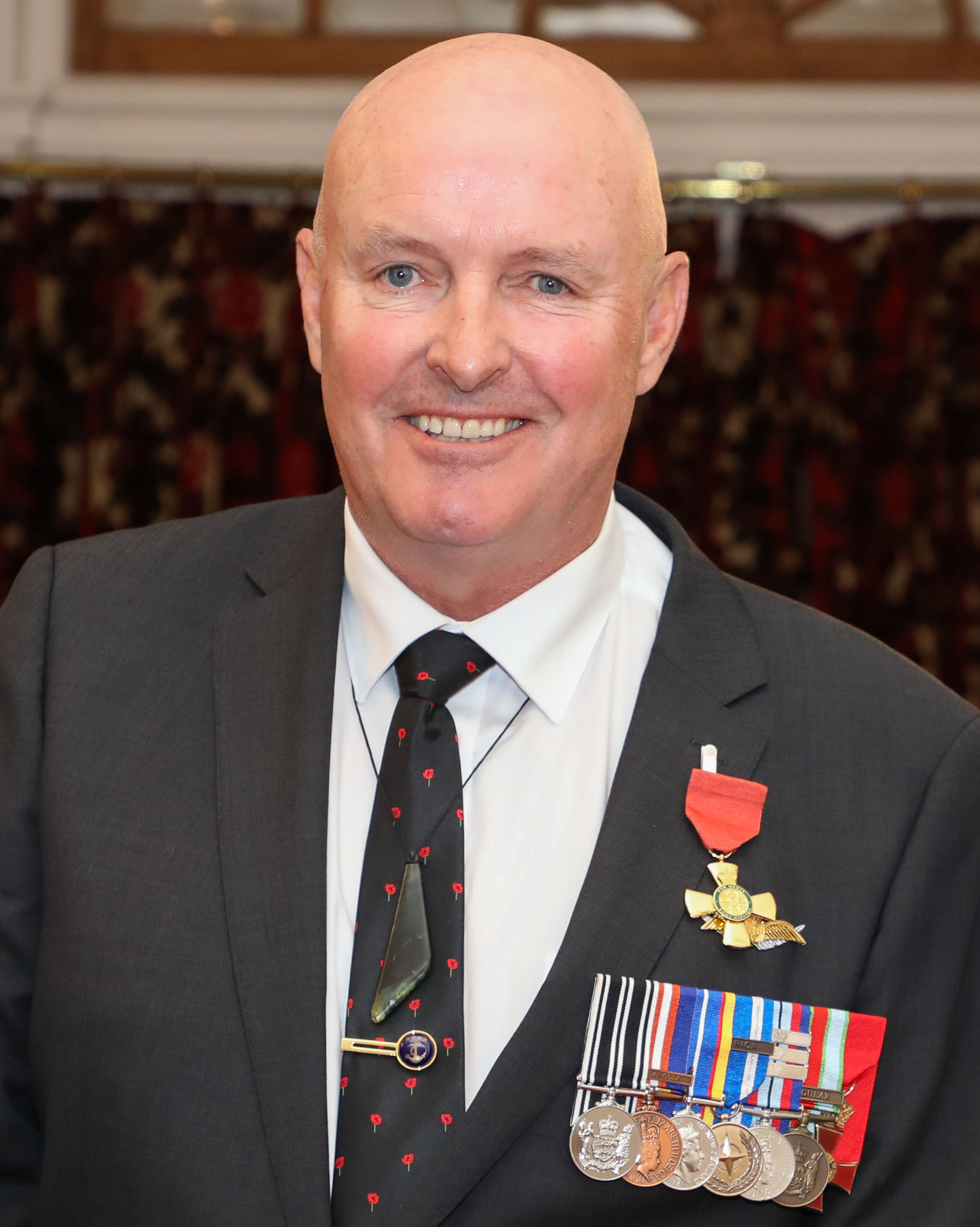
Jim Gilmour

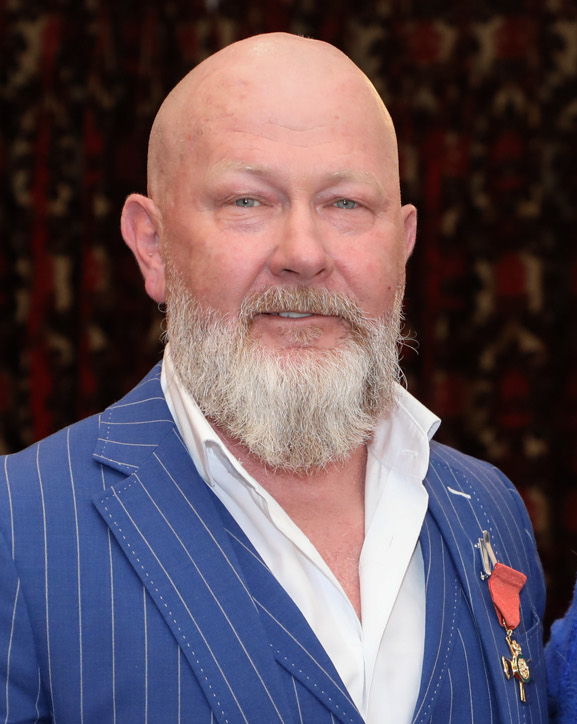
Kirk Hardy

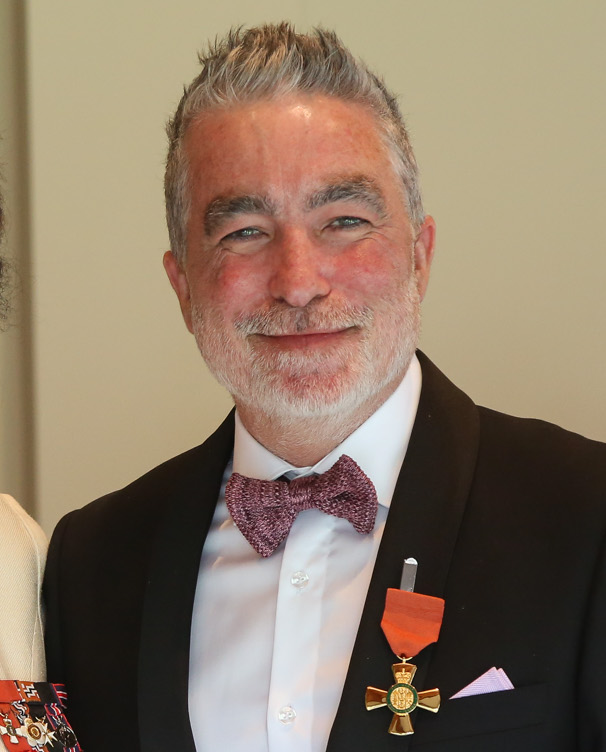
Dai Henwood

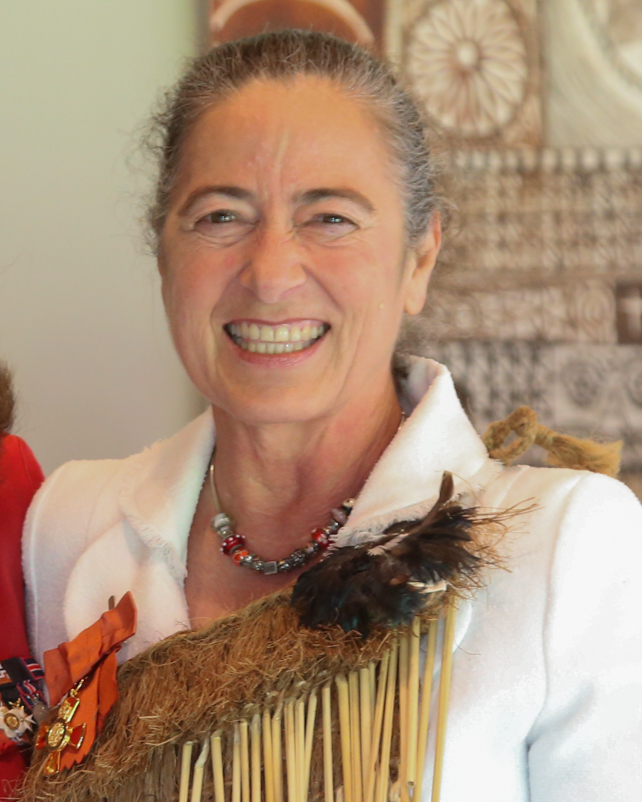
Patria Hume

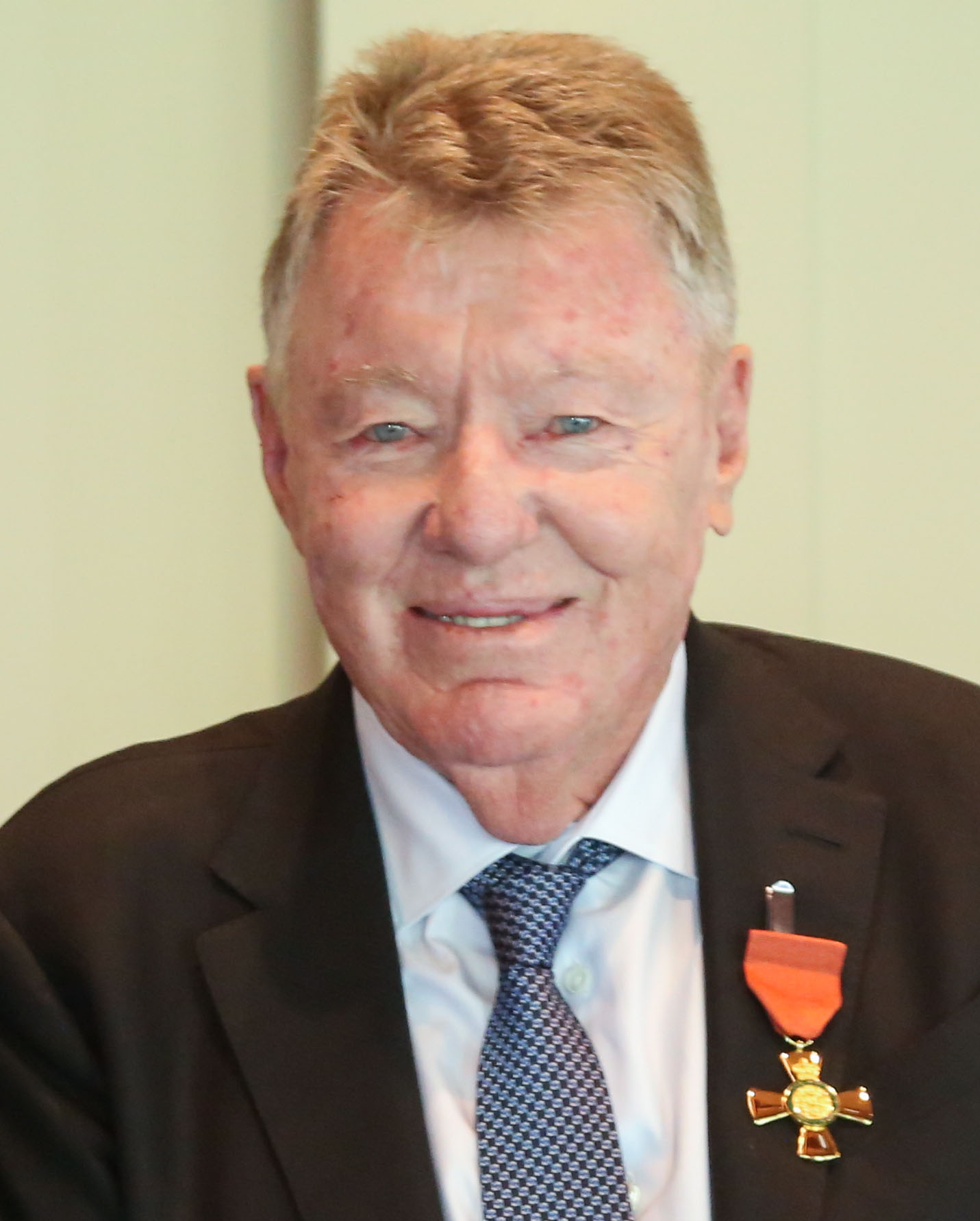
Gary Lane

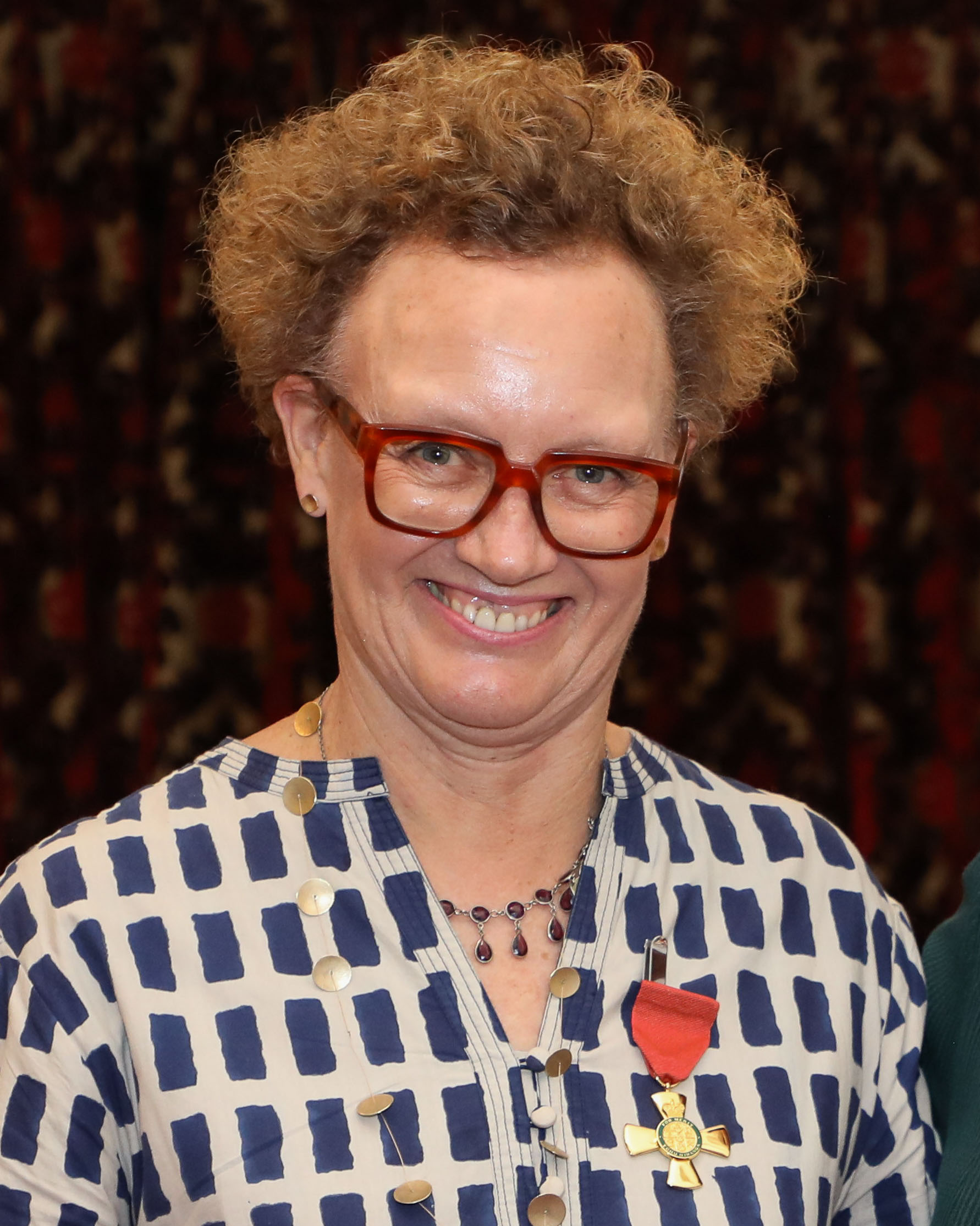
Julia Marshall

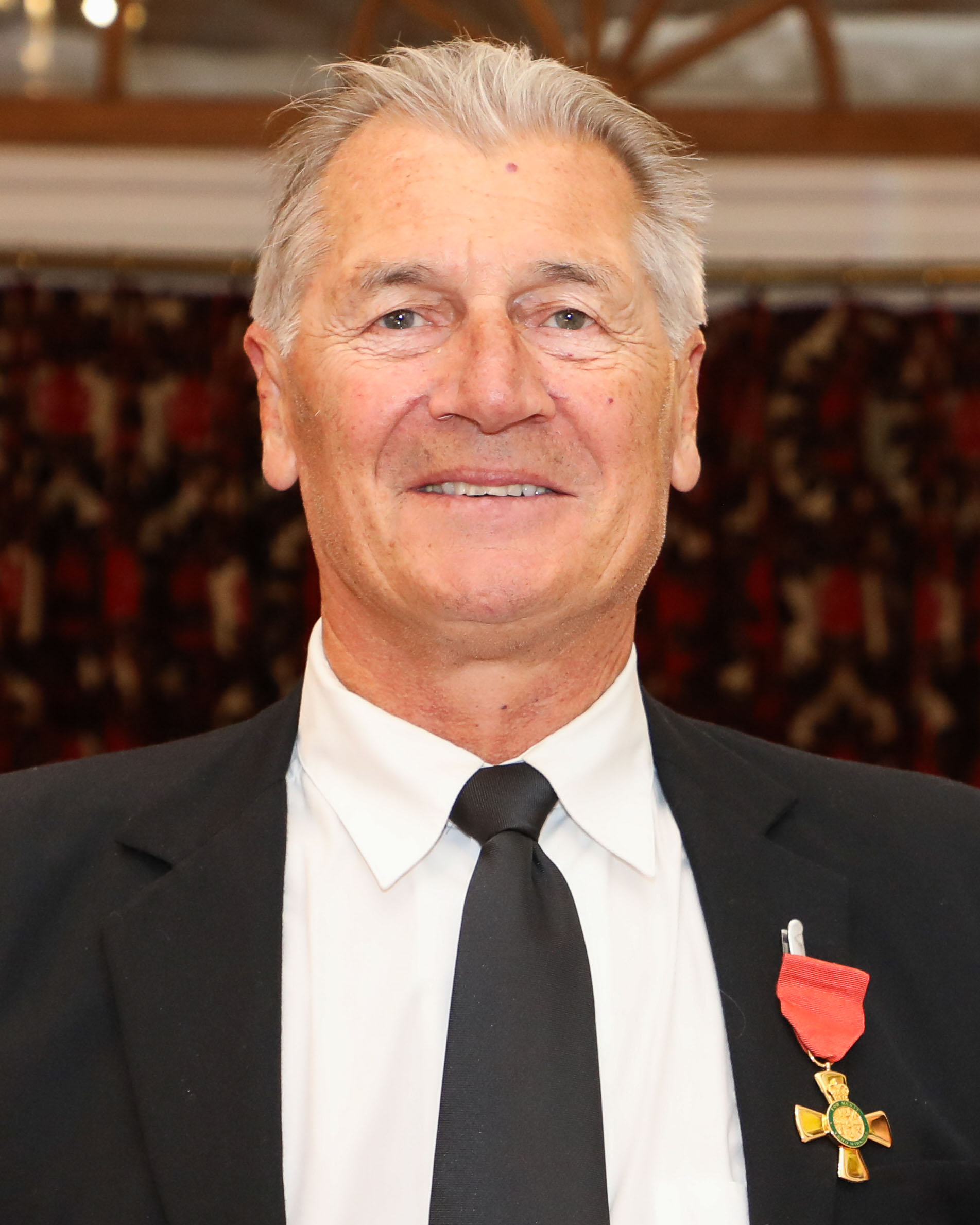
Murray Mexted

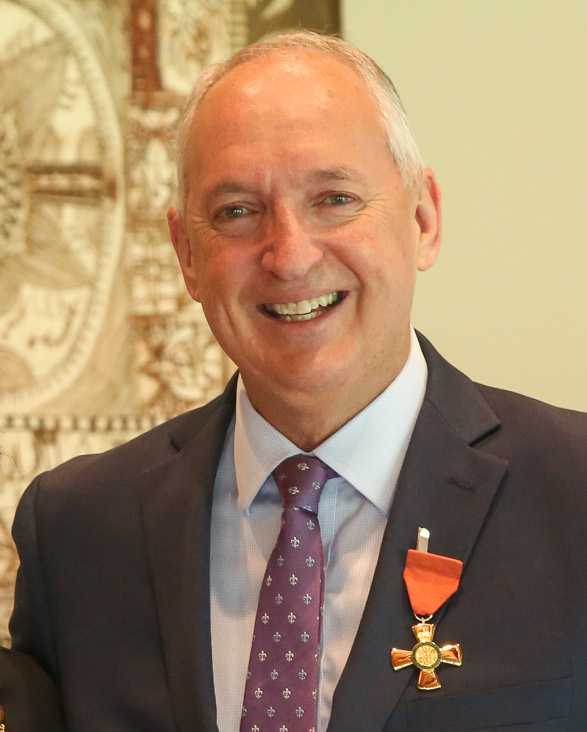
David Morgan

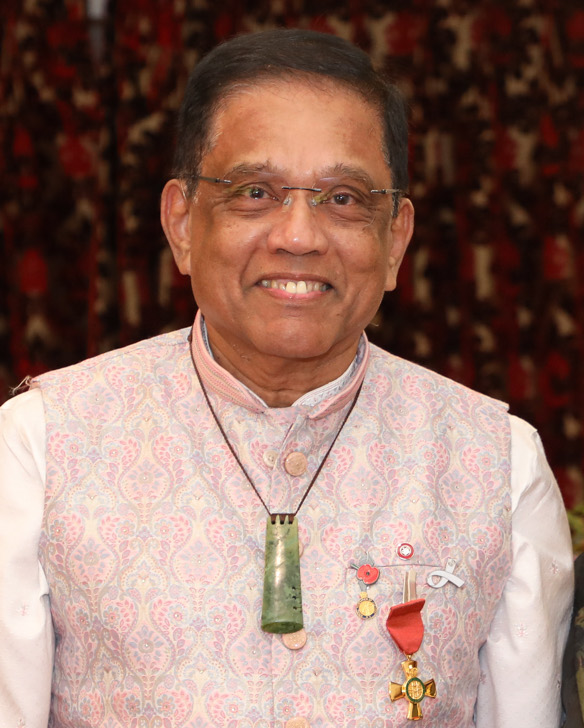
Pancha Narayanan

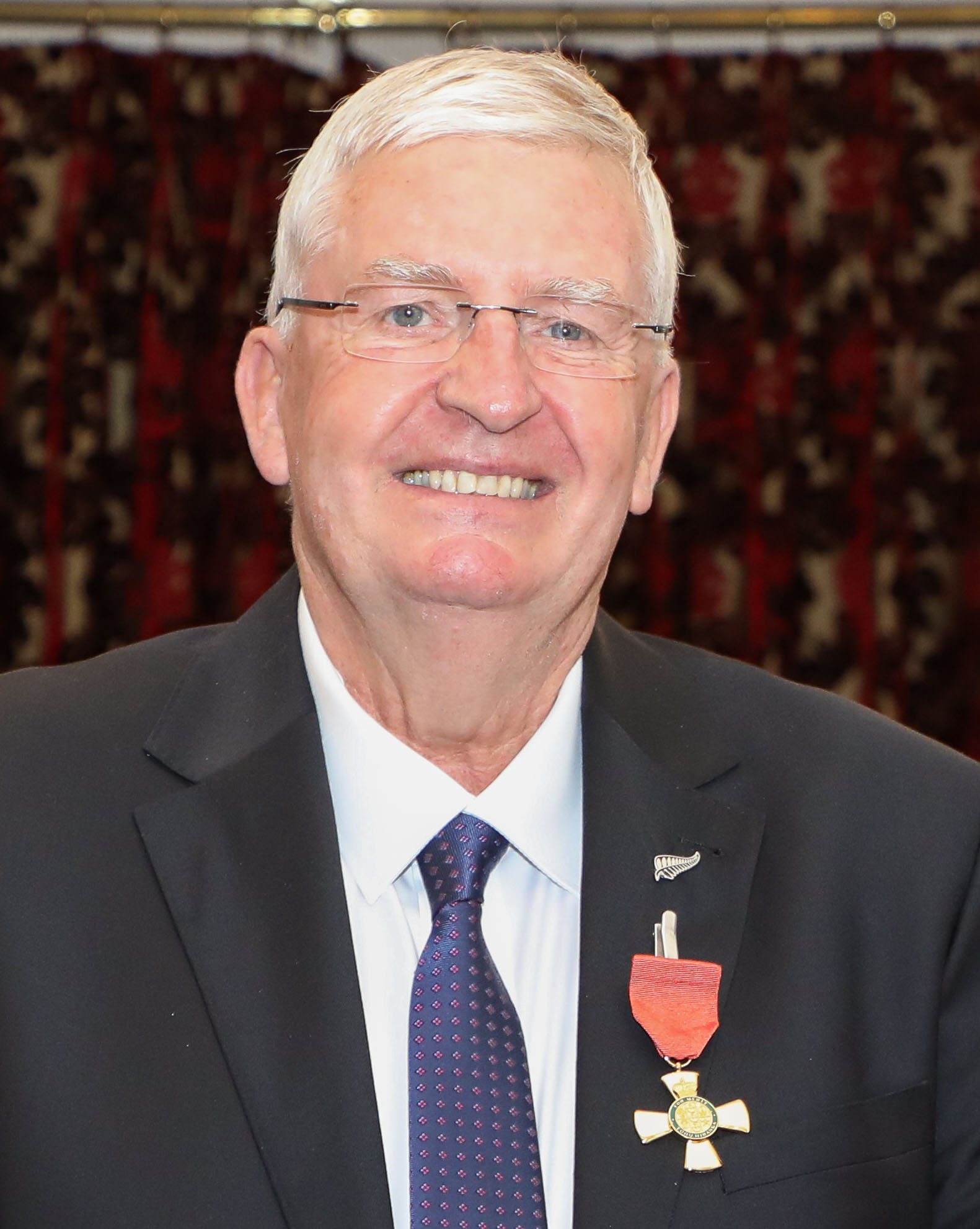
Peter Nation

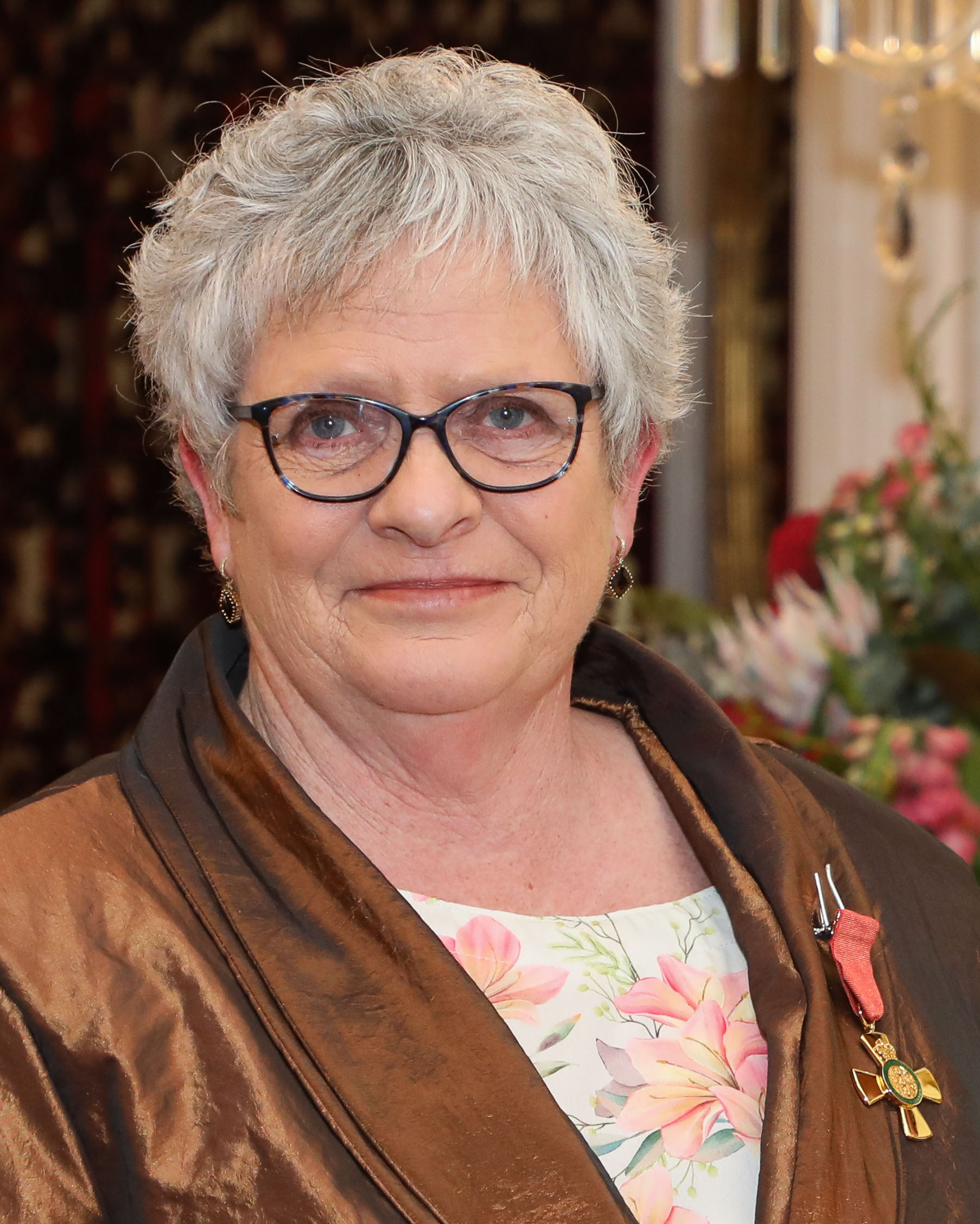
Gill Naylor

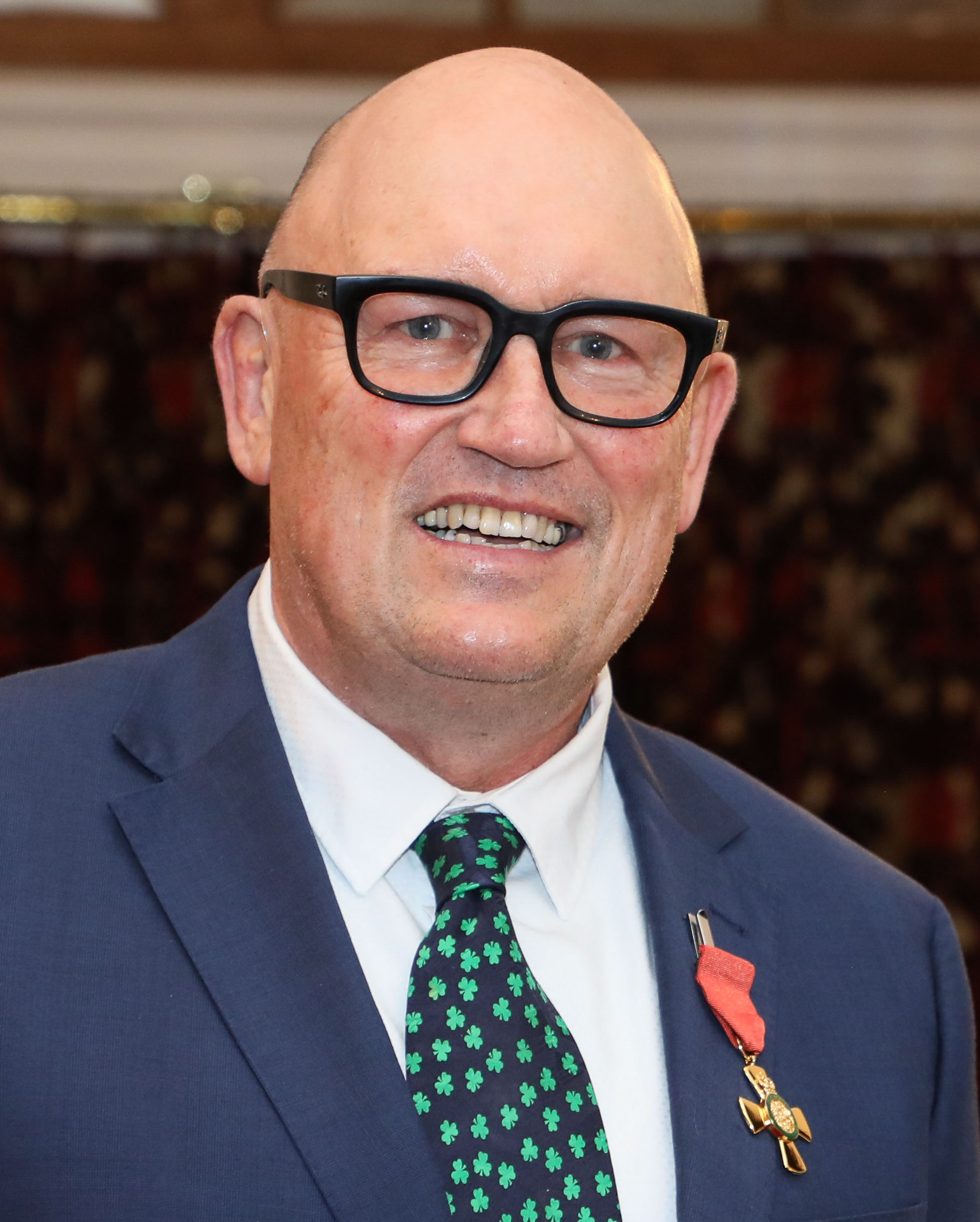
John O'Sullivan

Fiona Pardington

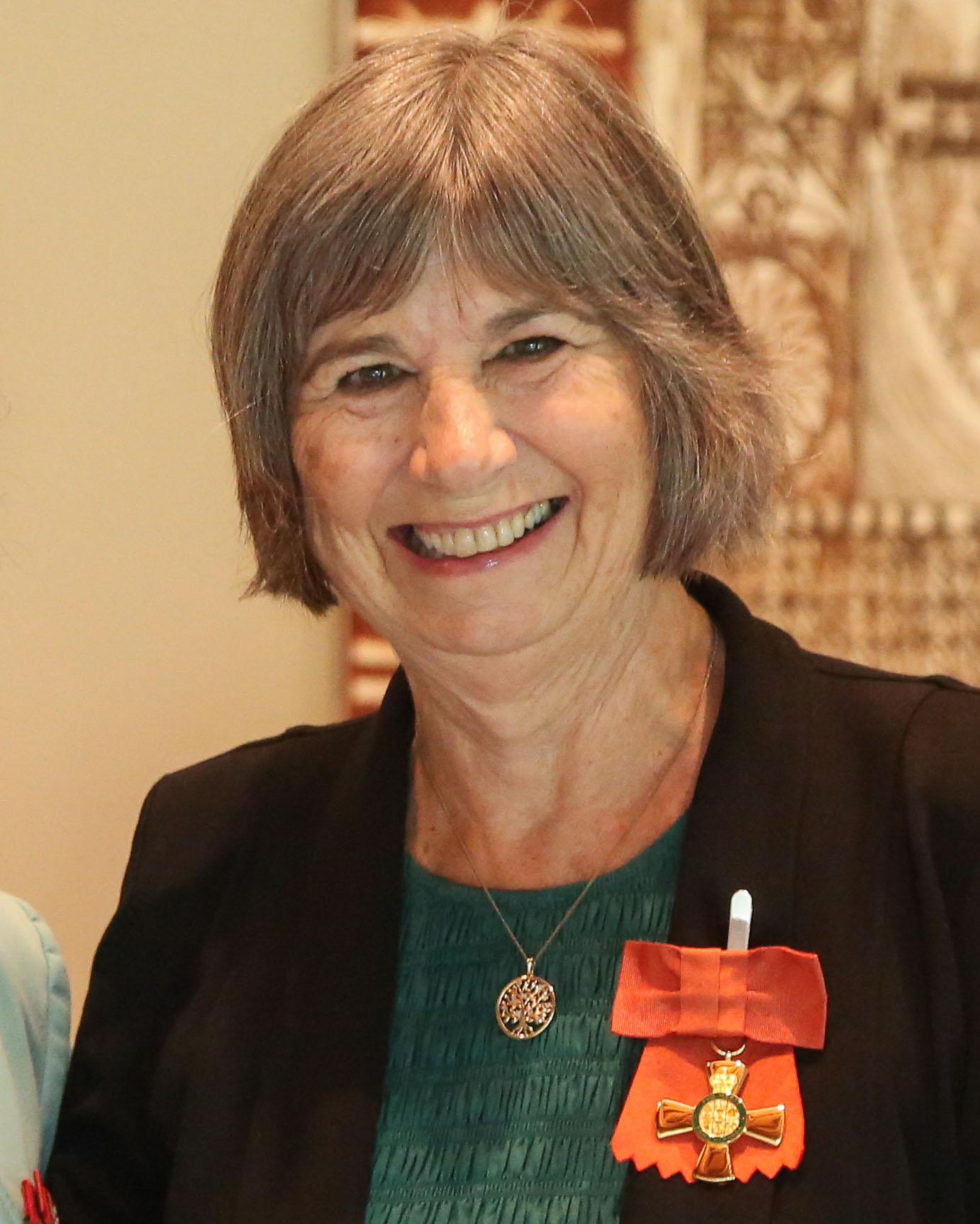
Susan Parry

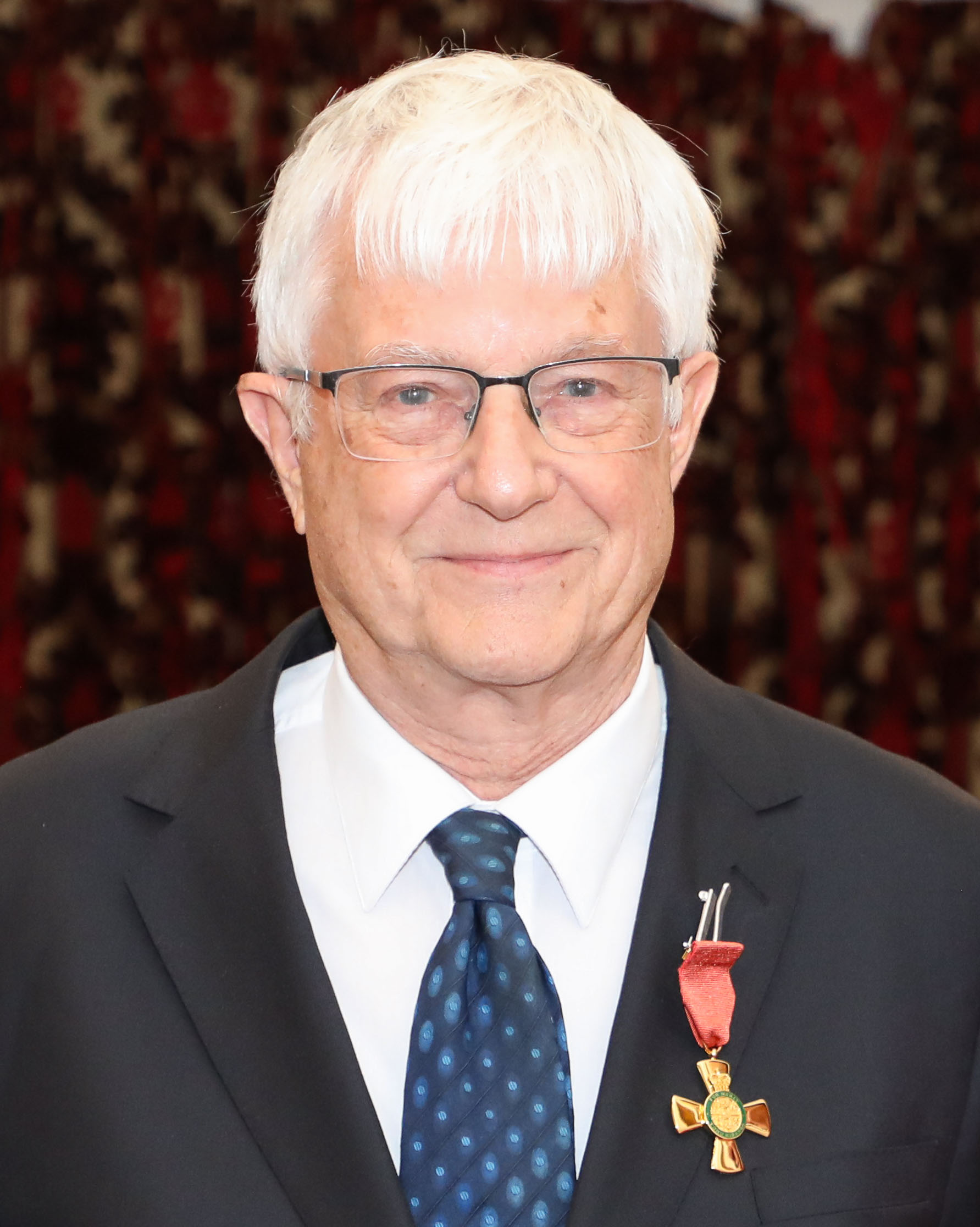
David Percy

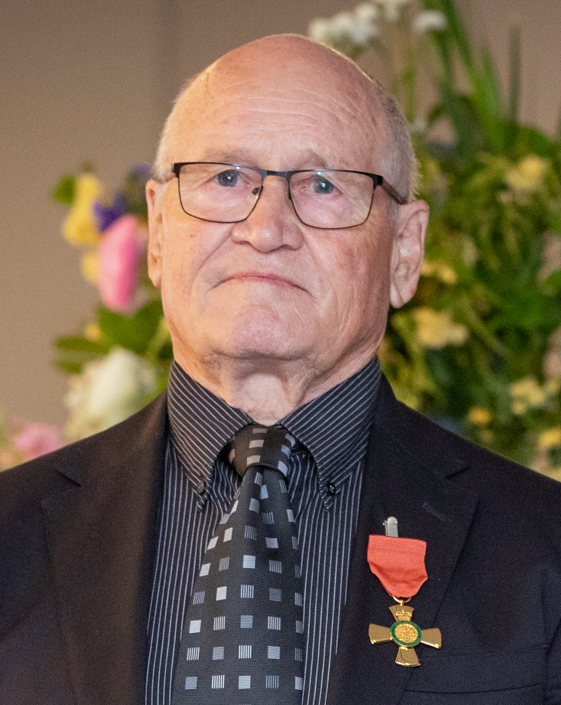
Clive Power

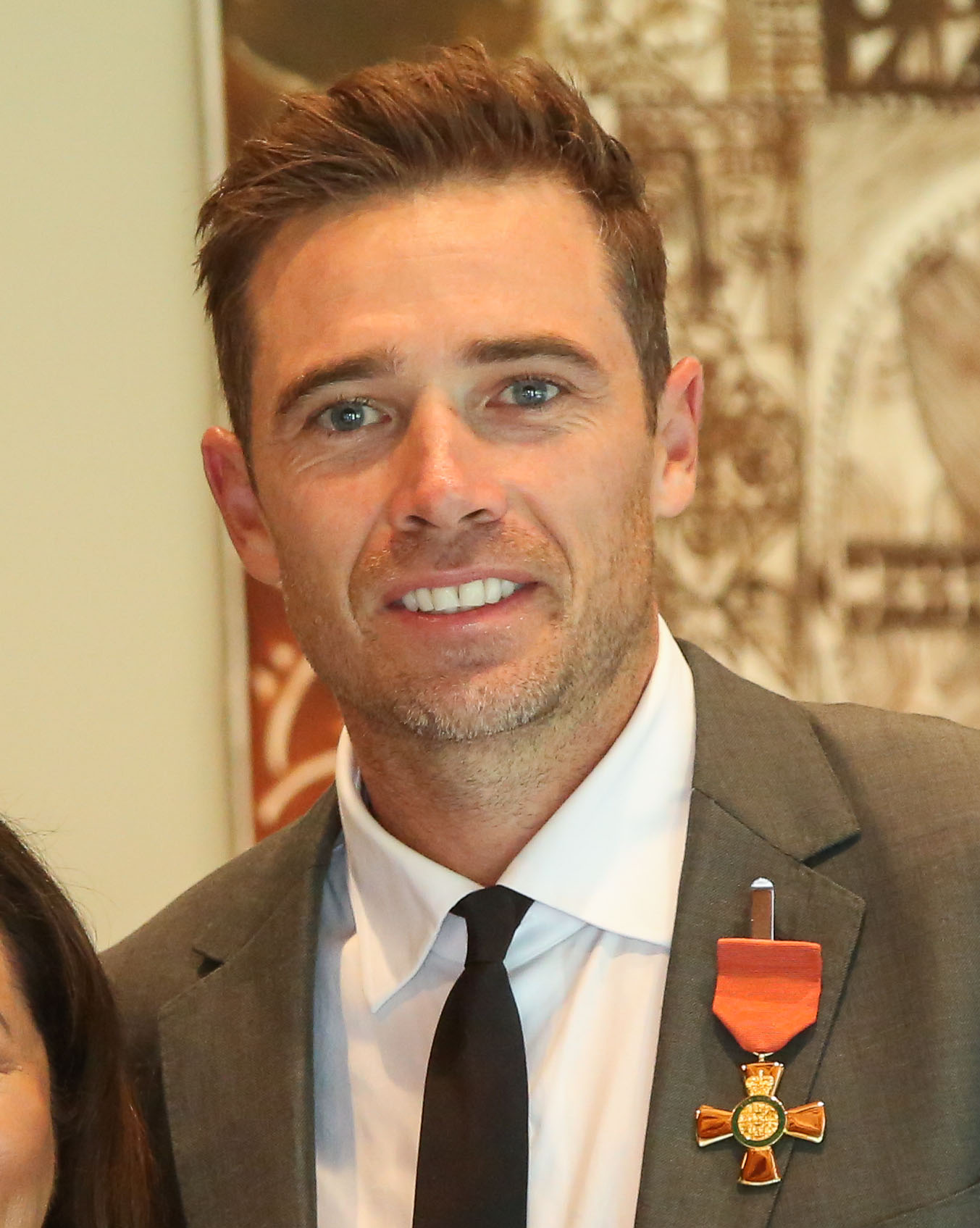
Tim Southee

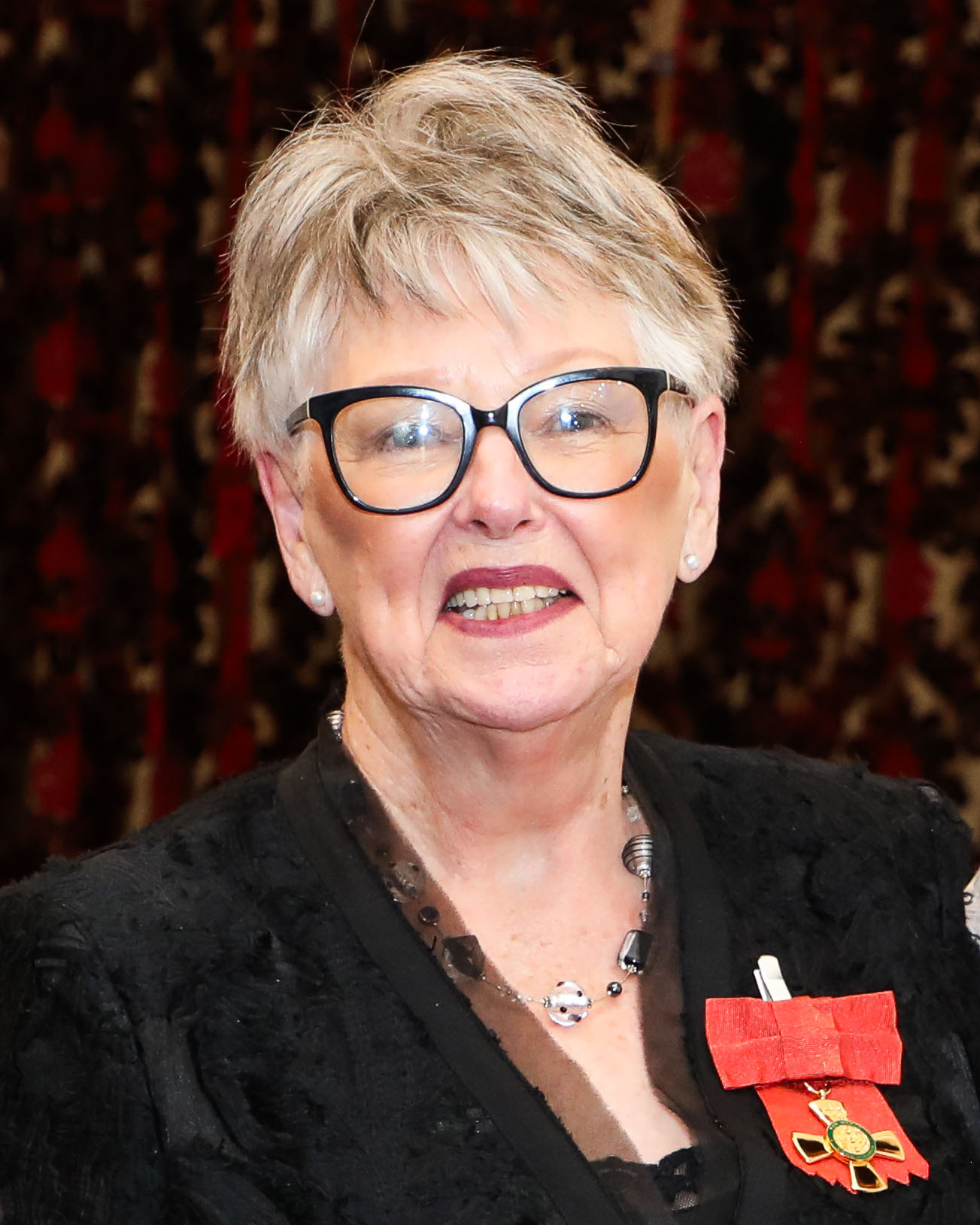
Gail Spence

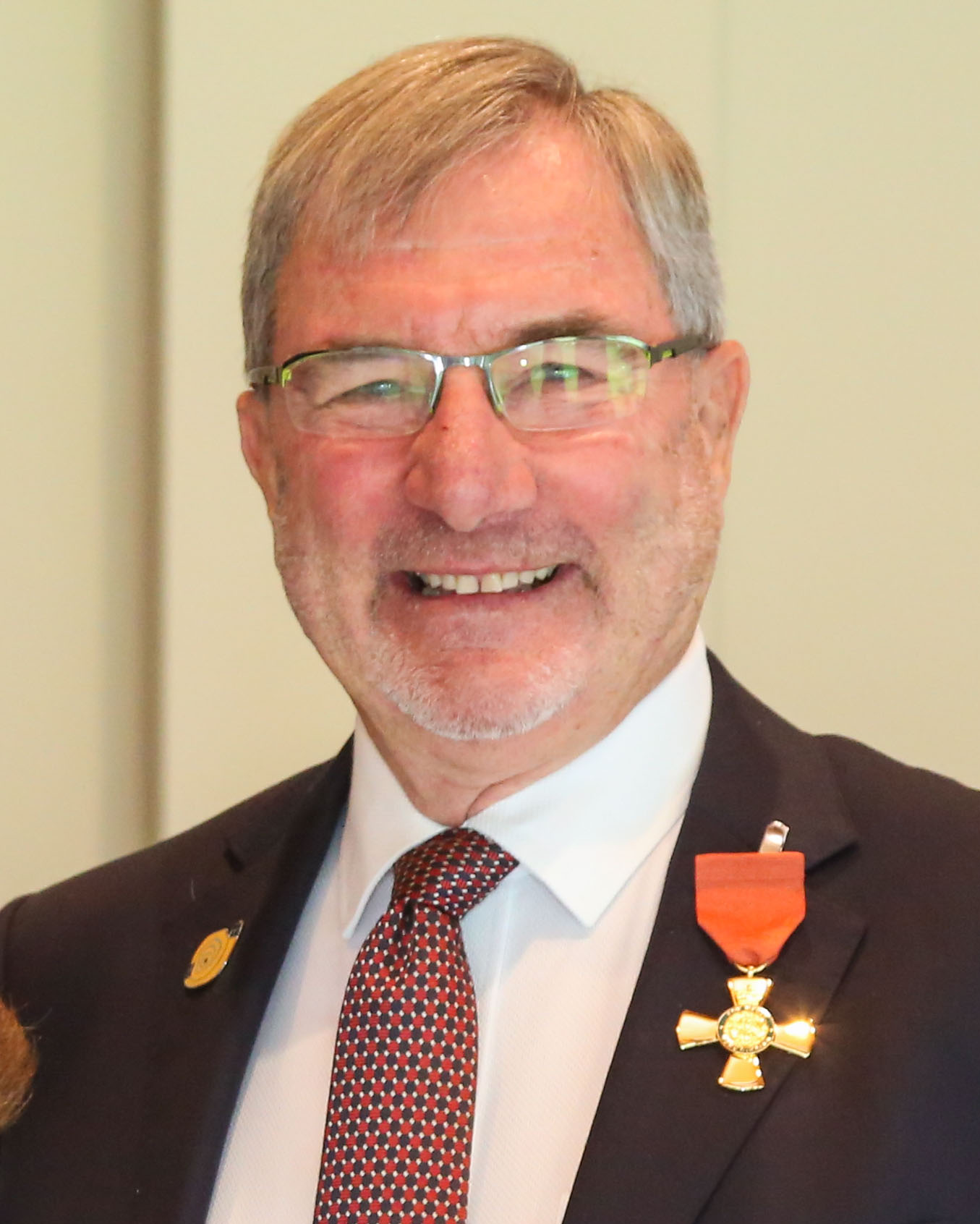
Paul Spoonley

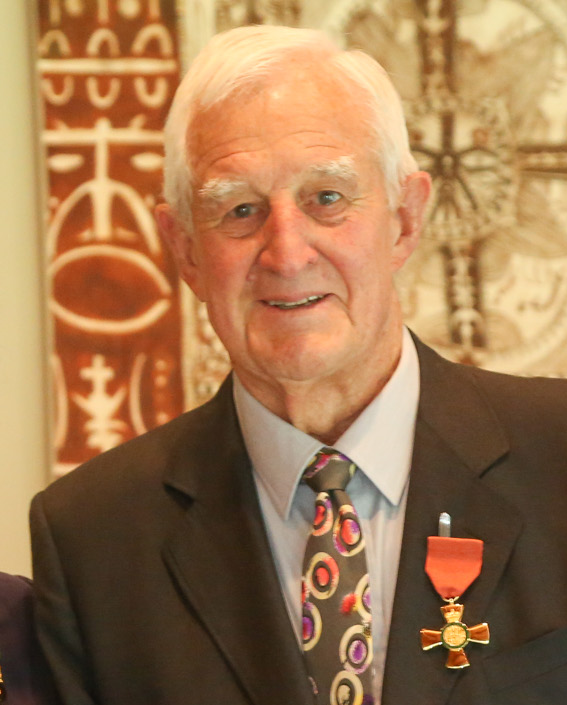
John Struthers

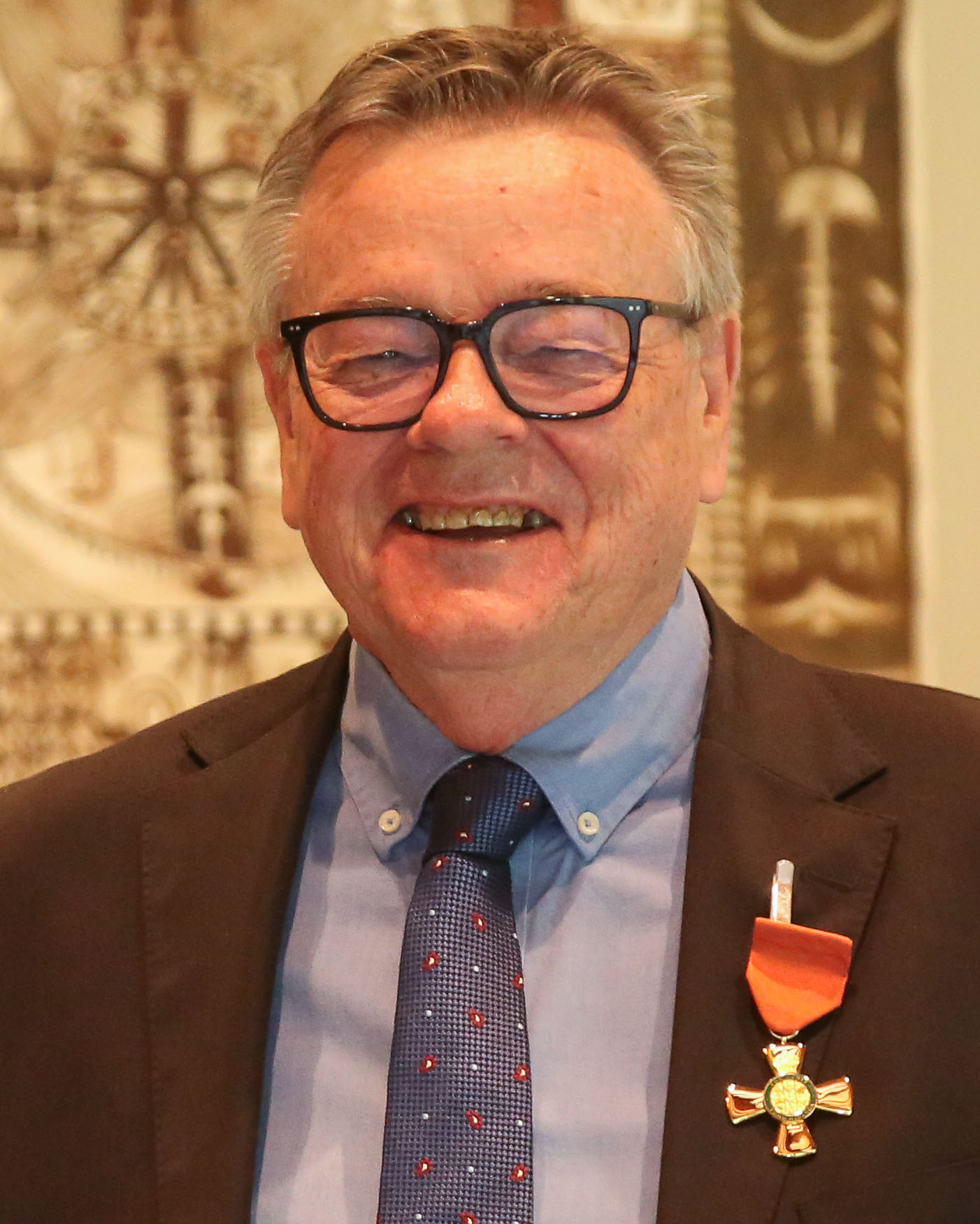
Mark Vela

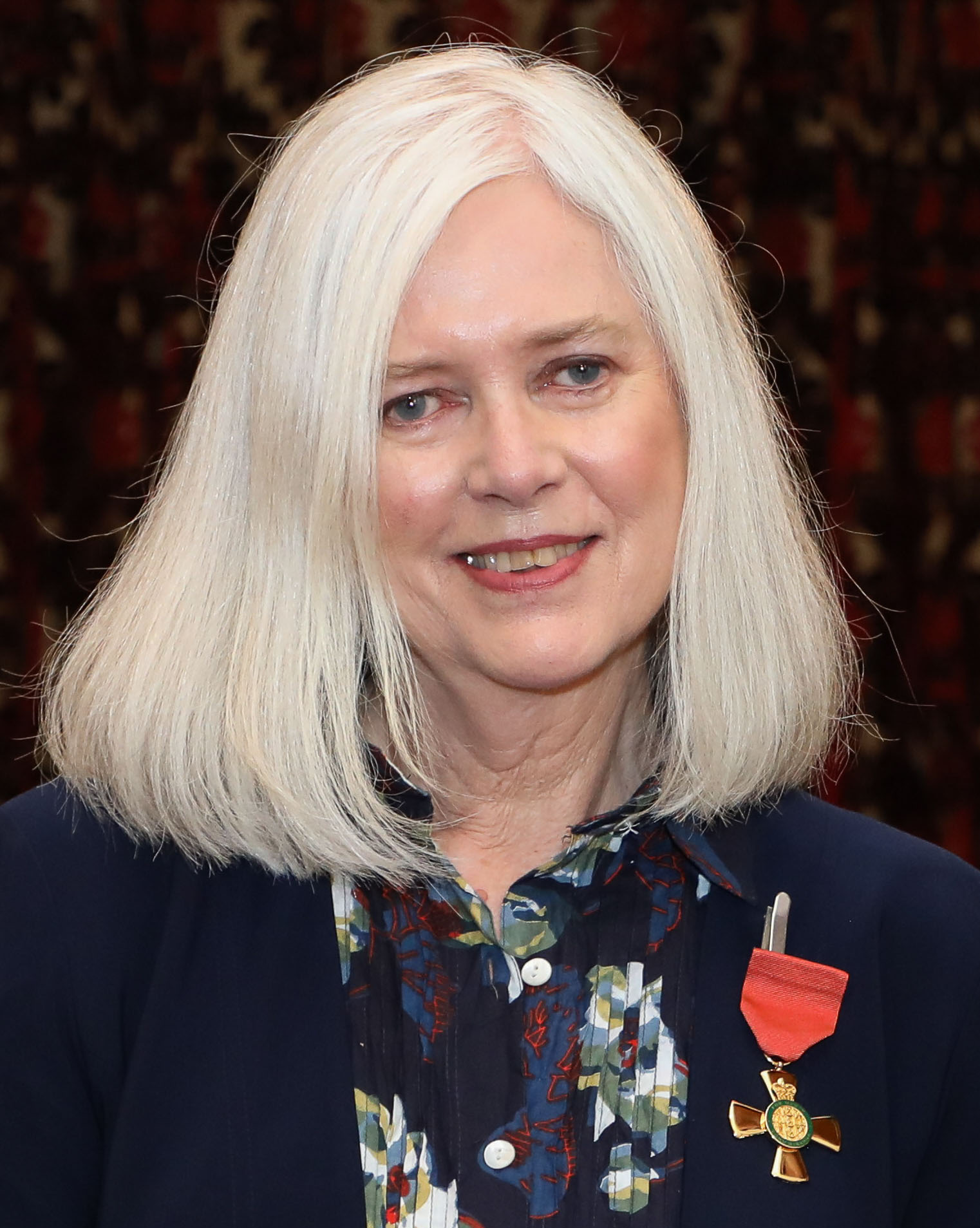
Jenny Wake

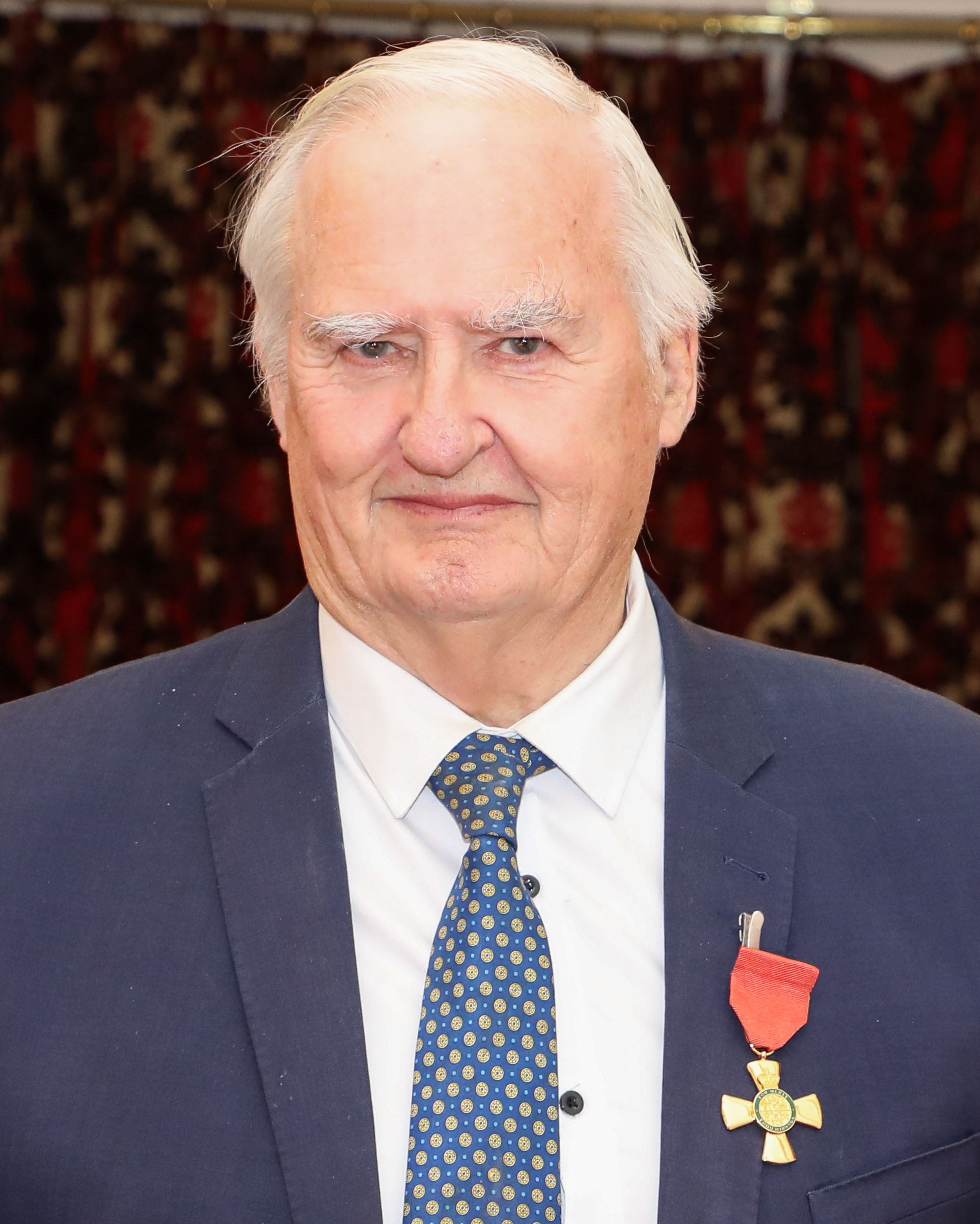
Neil Walker

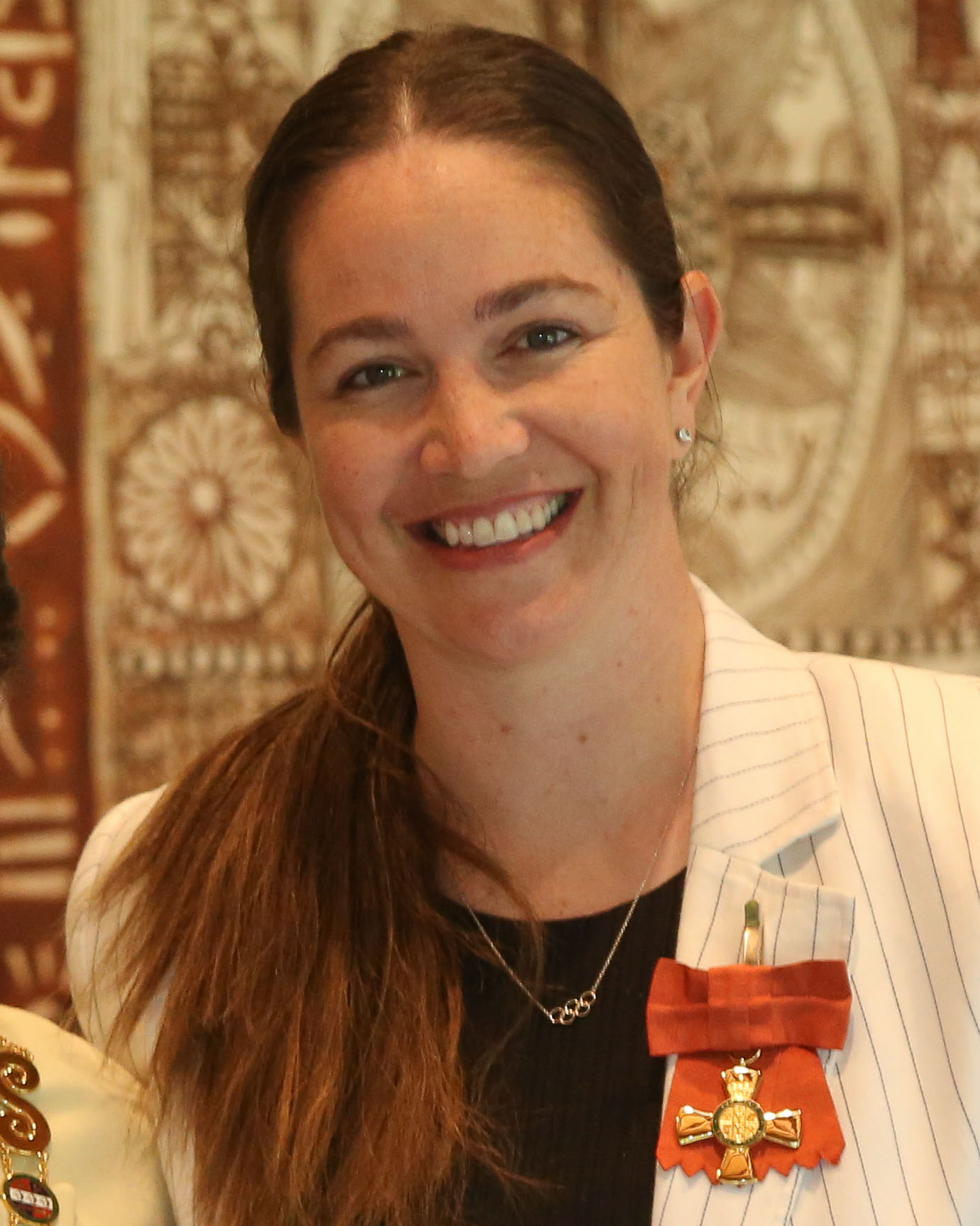
Sarah Walker

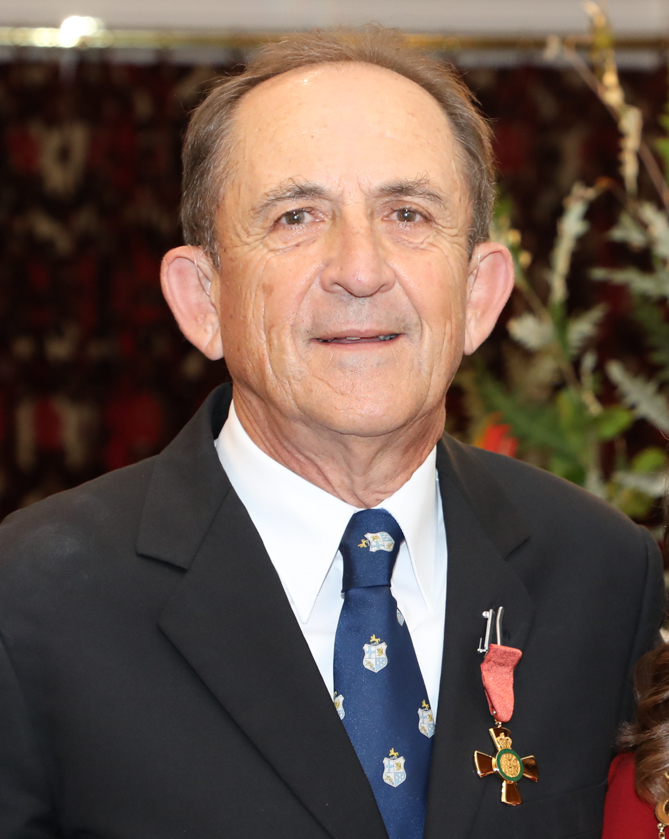
Richard Wild

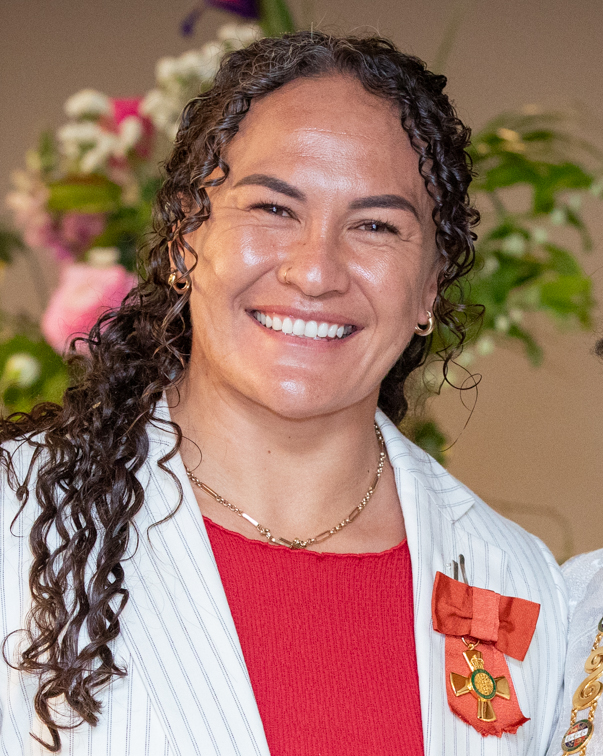
Portia Woodman‑Wickliffe

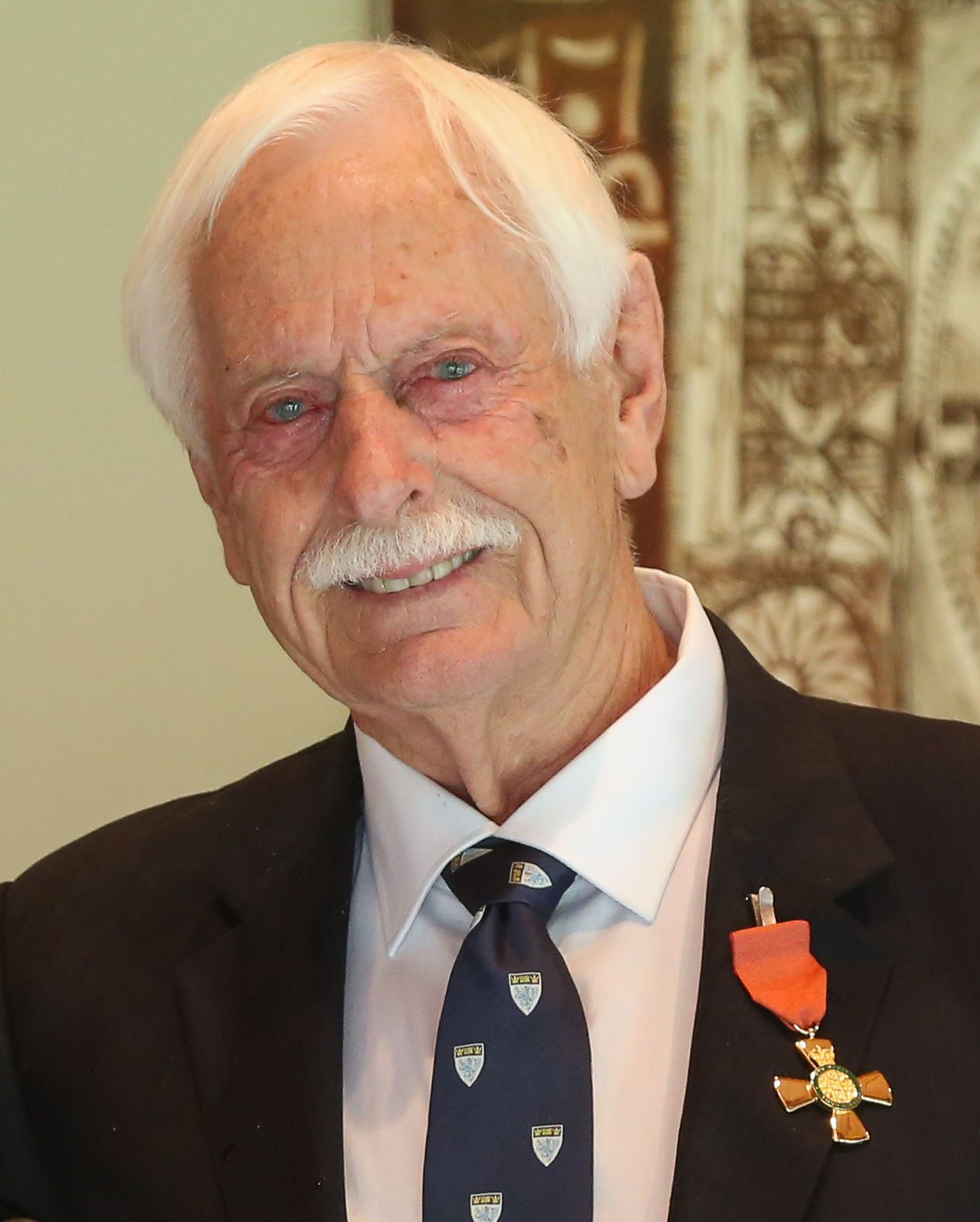
Wayne Wright

=== Member (MNZM) ===
- Anae Lupematasila Lima Arthur John Anae – of Auckland. For services to the Samoan community.
- Ellesse Mote Andrews – of Cambridge. For services to cycling.
- Richard Balcombe-Langridge – of Auckland. For services to business.
- Catherine Juliet Bell – of Auckland. For services to food education.
- Dr Santosh Prasad Bhandari JP – of Auckland. For services to the Nepalese community.
- Darryl Bishop – of Orewa. For services to mental health.
- Victor Kenneth Boyd – of Auckland. For services to survivors of abuse in care.
- Anna Catherine Cottrell – of Wellington. For services to documentary film-making and migrant communities.
- Simon Eric Denny – of Berlin, Germany. For services to art.
- Welmoed (Chris) Duggan – of Ātiamuri. For services to science education.
- Ronald Bruce Ealam – of Oxford. For services to Search and Rescue.
- Robert Tuahuru Edwards – of Ōpōtiki. For services to the community and governance.
- Susan Ann Elley – of Christchurch. For services to education.
- Terri Jayne Fairhall (Terri Middleton) – of Greymouth. For services to the New Zealand Police and the community.
- Allison Daphne Christina Franklin – of Christchurch. For services to people with disabilities.
- Okesene Uili Galo – of Wellington. For services to the Tokelau community.
- Rez Gardi – of Auckland. For services to refugees and human rights advocacy.
- Alan Charles Gilmore – of Lake Tekapo. For services to astronomy.
- Francis Quinn Goldingham – of Palmerston North. For services to outdoor recreation and seniors.
- Elizabeth Helen Graham – of Hastings. For services to Māori and education.
- Patricia Pearl Gregory – of Auckland. For services to the fashion industry.
- Aaron Mark Halstead – of Queenstown. For services to Search and Rescue and the tourism industry.
- Dr Nina Emilia Hood – of Auckland. For services to education.
- Lesley Mary Huckins – of Christchurch. For services to swimming.
- Meleua Enda Ikiua – of Auckland. For services to Vagahau Niue language and education.
- Martin Kaipo – of Whangārei. For services to social services and the community.
- Lalita Vanmali Kasanji – of Wellington. For services to the IT industry and the Indian community.
- Brian Patrick Kelly – of Tauranga. For services to broadcasting.
- William James Kermode – of Auckland. For services to governance and philanthropy.
- Pamela Margaret Kilmartin – of Lake Tekapo. For services to astronomy.
- John Junior Kumitau – of Te Kamo. For services to the Pacific community.
- Laurinne Marion Laing – of Auckland. For services to sports and people with intellectual disabilities.
- Ross James Lawrence – of Queenstown. For services to the ski industry.
- Lisa Li – of Auckland. For services to the tourism industry.
- James Eric Lilley – of Christchurch. For services to conservation and the community.
- Janet Crystal-Lee Lilo – of Auckland. For services to the arts.
- Pauline-Jean Henrietta Luyten – of Timaru. For services to rugby and the Pacific community.
- The Reverend David Elliott Major – of Levin. For services to the community and the State.
- Ngatepaeru Marsters – of Auckland. For services to midwifery and Pacific communities.
- Lloyd James McCallum JP – of Winton. For services to the dairy industry and the environment.
- Suzanne Michelle McFadden – of Auckland. For services to sports journalism and women.
- Ian Robert Flockhart McKelvie – of Palmerston North. For services to local government, governance and as a Member of Parliament.
- Grant Allan McMillan ED – of Christchurch. For services to education and the community.
- Victoria Mary Mee – of Pukekohe. For services to women and business.
- Eugene Joseph Meredith – of Auckland. For services to American football.
- Allan George Mincher – of Christchurch. For services to aviation engineering.
- Margaret Mary Mitchell – of Auckland. For services to the Royal New Zealand Naval Women’s Association.
- Dr Alishia Rangiwhakawaitau Moeahu – of Lower Hutt. For services to Māori culture.
- Dr Malcolm George Davis Mulholland – of Palmerston North. For services to health and Māori.
- Khoa Truong Nguyen – of Lower Hutt. For services to New Zealand–Vietnam relations and the community.
- Julia Louisa Pearse – of Dunedin. For services to governance and the community.
- Sunit Prakash JP – of Wellington. For services to the IT industry and the Indian community.
- Dr Maxine Mariri Ronald – of Parua Bay. For services to breast cancer treatment and research.
- Gary James Herbert Rooney – of Waimate. For services to business and philanthropy.
- Bruce Winston Ross – of Invercargill. For services to cycling.
- Charles Edward Ross – of Ashburton. For services to the community.
- Morrin Jackson Rout – of Lyttelton. For services to the arts, particularly literature.
- Annie Burma Teina Tangata Esita Scoon – of Palmerston North. For services to softball and the Pacific community.
- Diana Rosemary Shand – of Christchurch. For services to the environment and the community.
- Simon John Caufield Strombom DSD ED – of Porirua. For services to war commemoration and historical preservation.
- Veronica Ngarutai Kaye Thompson – of Wellington. For services to basketball.
- Diane Anita Turner JP – of Whakatāne. For services to governance, seniors and Māori.
- Hariata Ann Vercoe – of Rotorua. For services to Māori, health, and the community.
- Louise Annette Wallace – of Auckland. For services to the entertainment industry.
- Andrew Norman Williamson – of Pegasus. For services to agriculture.
- Marilyn Kay Yeoman – of Hamilton. For services to education and the community.

Honorary

- Viliami Teumohenga – of Ashhurst. For services to education and the Pacific community.
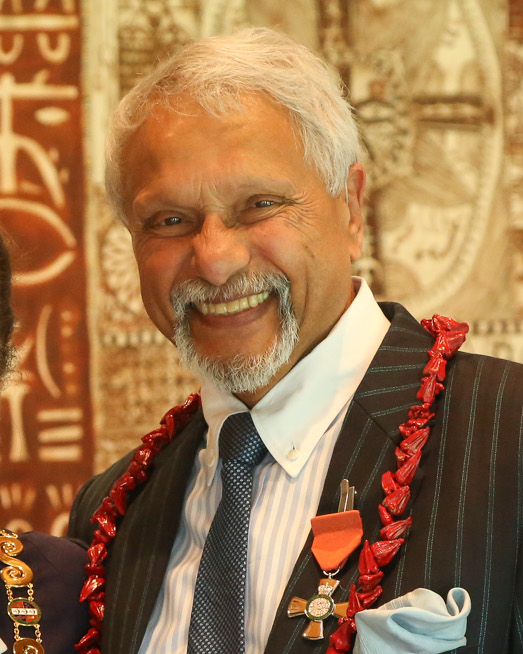
Arthur Anae

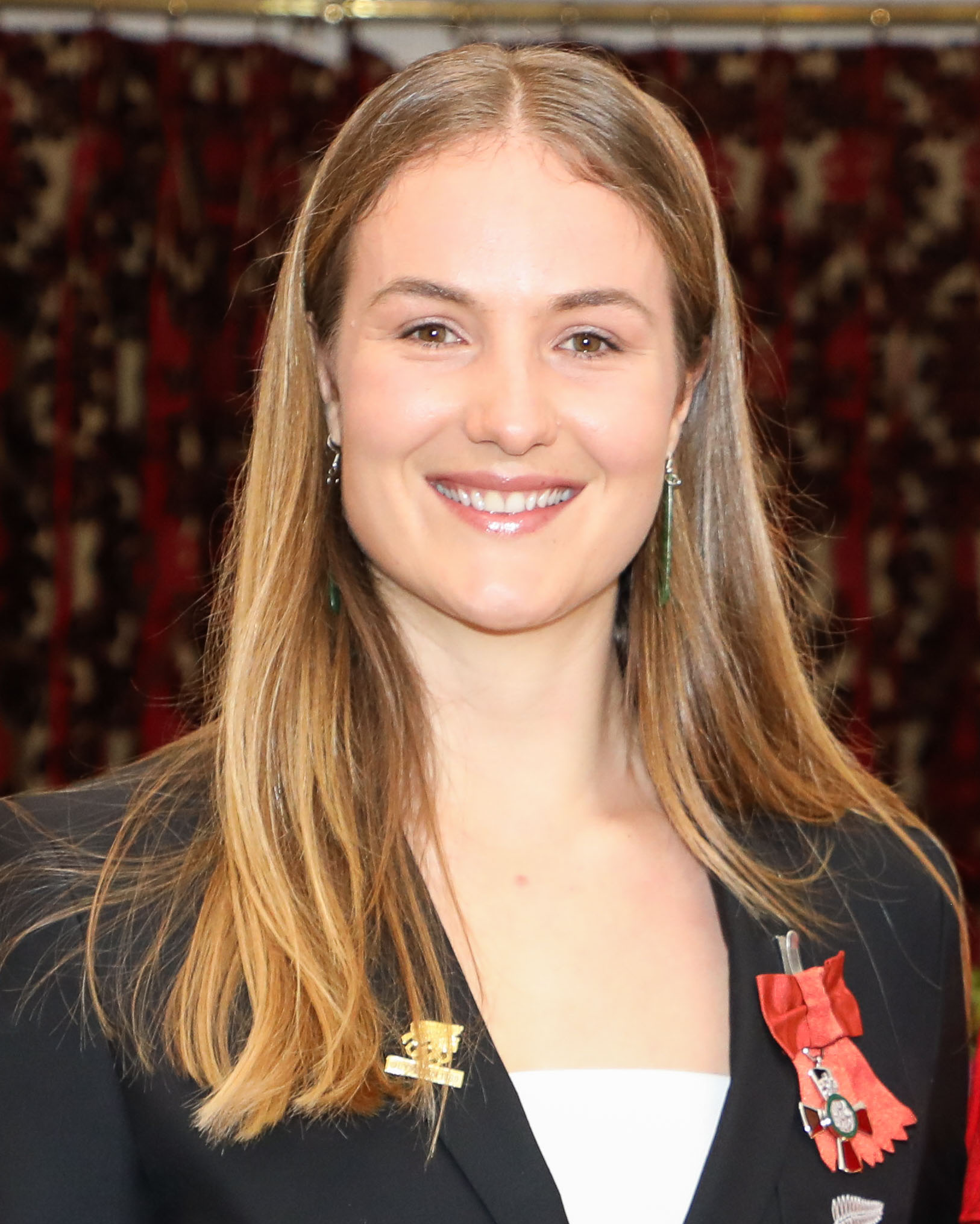
Ellesse Andrews

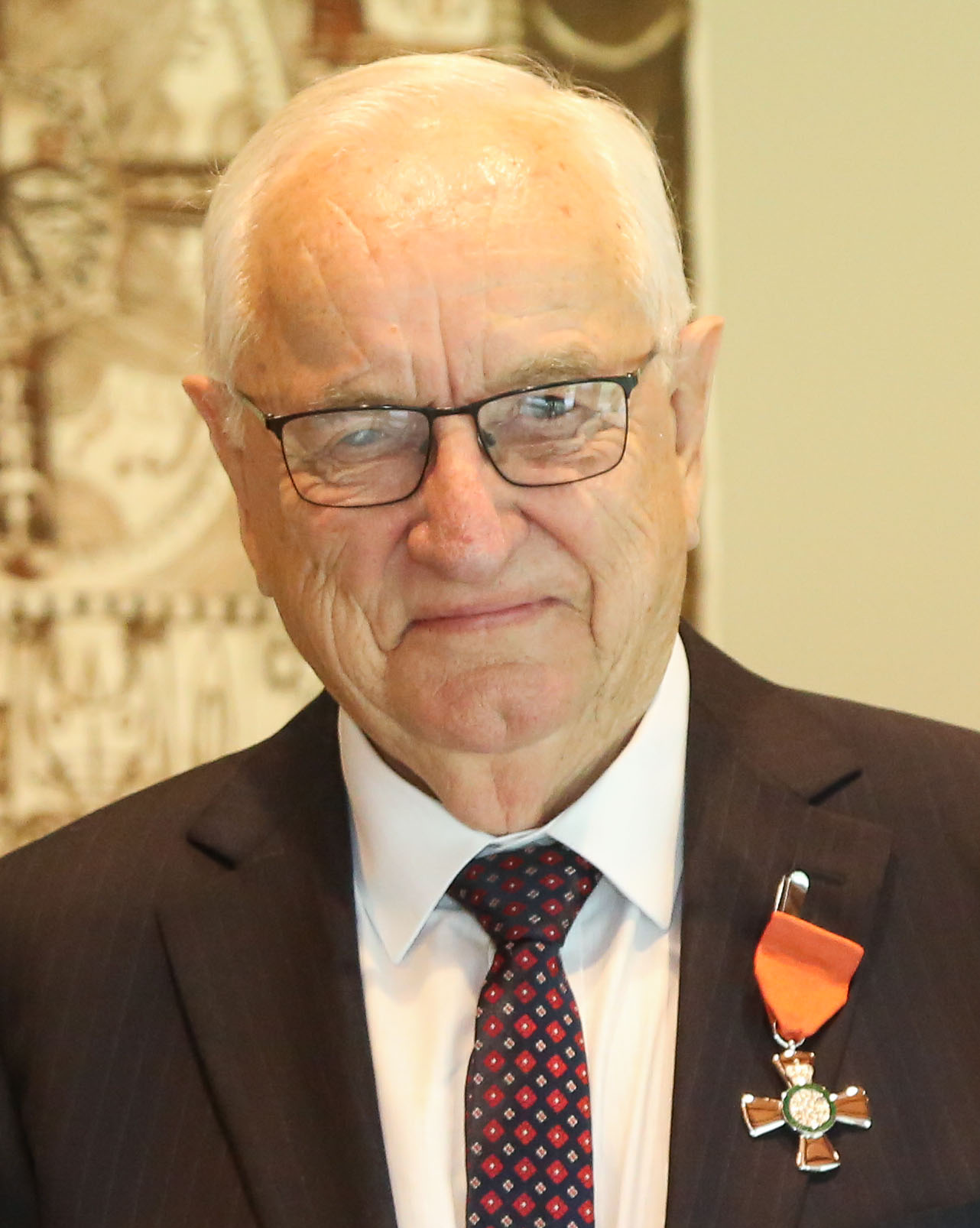
Richard Balcombe-Langridge

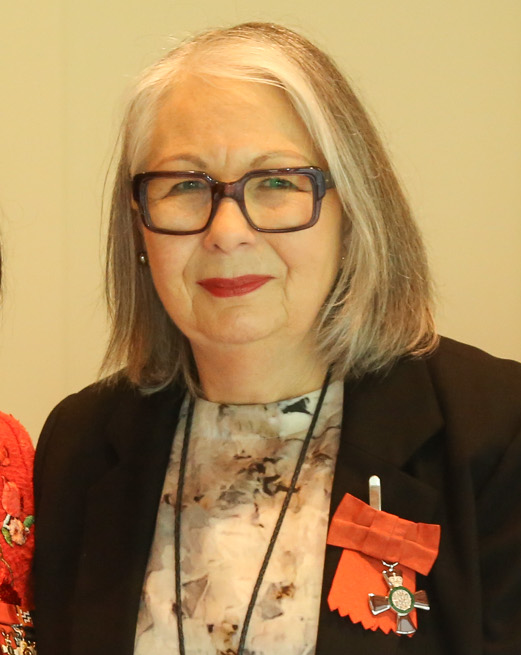
Catherine Bell

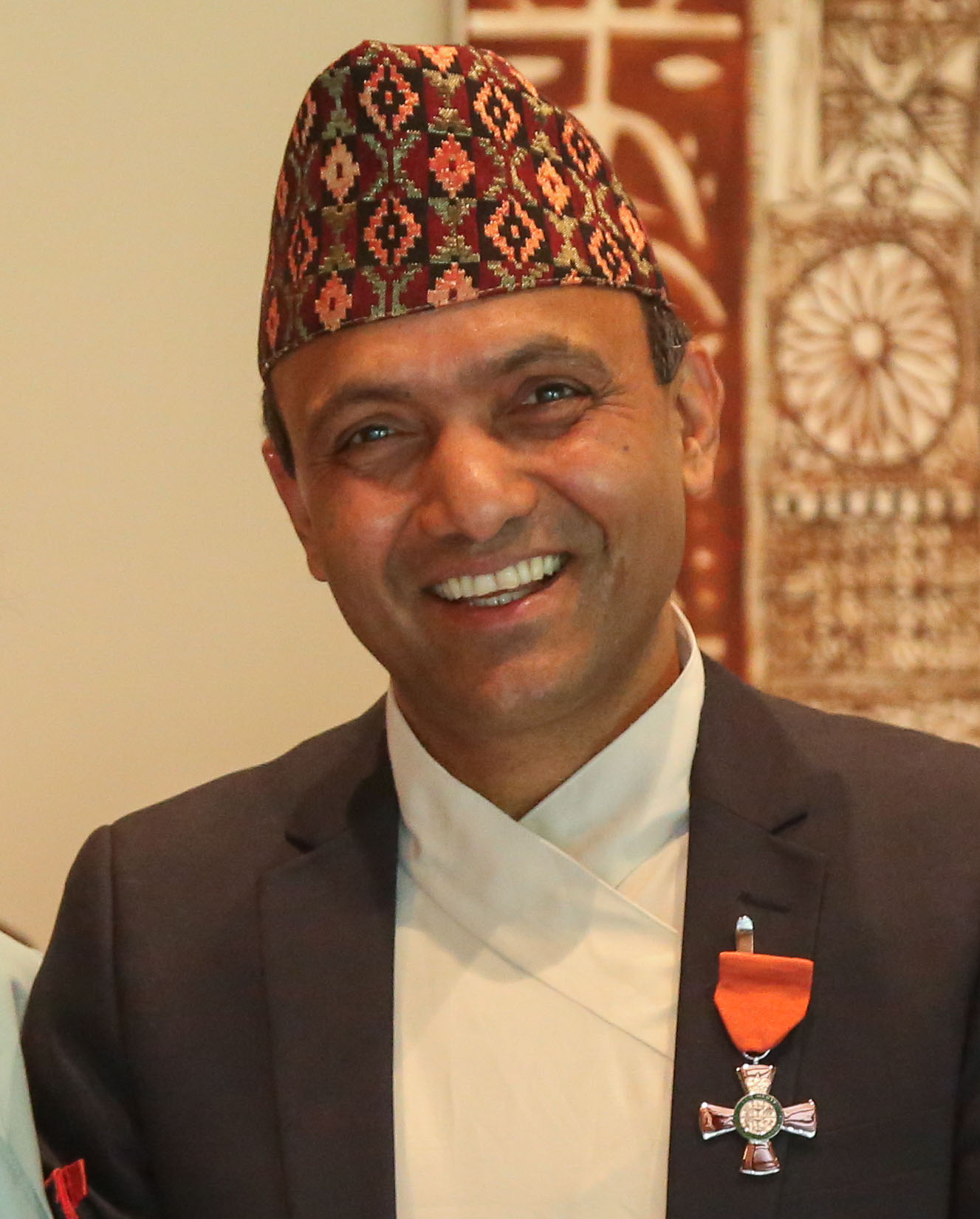
Santosh Bhandari

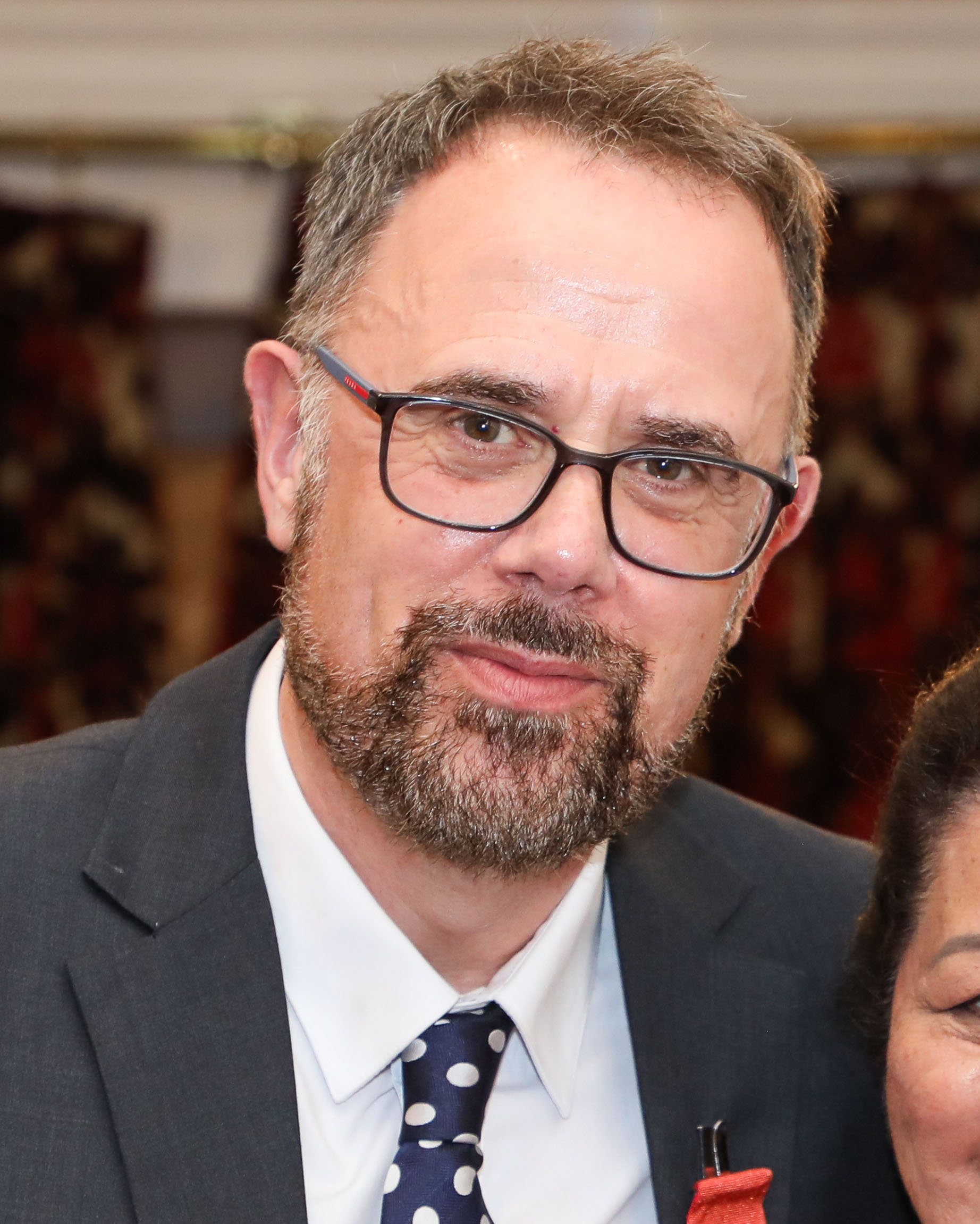
Darryl Bishop

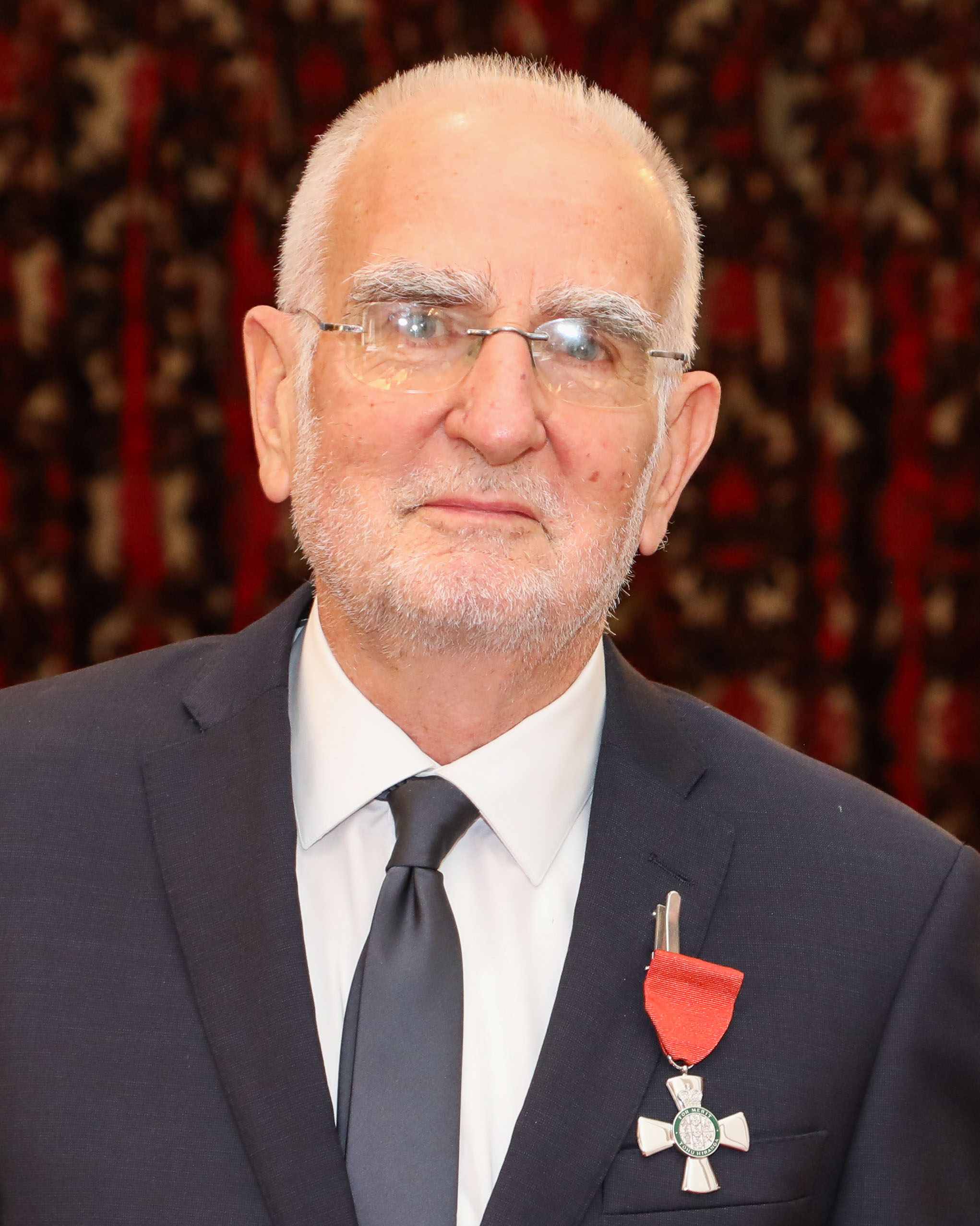
Victor Boyd

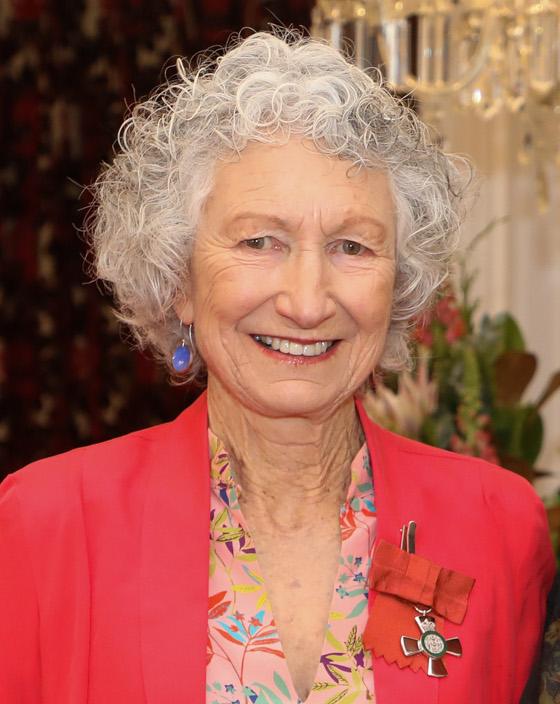
Anna Cottrell

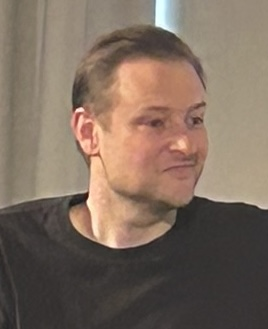
Simon Denny

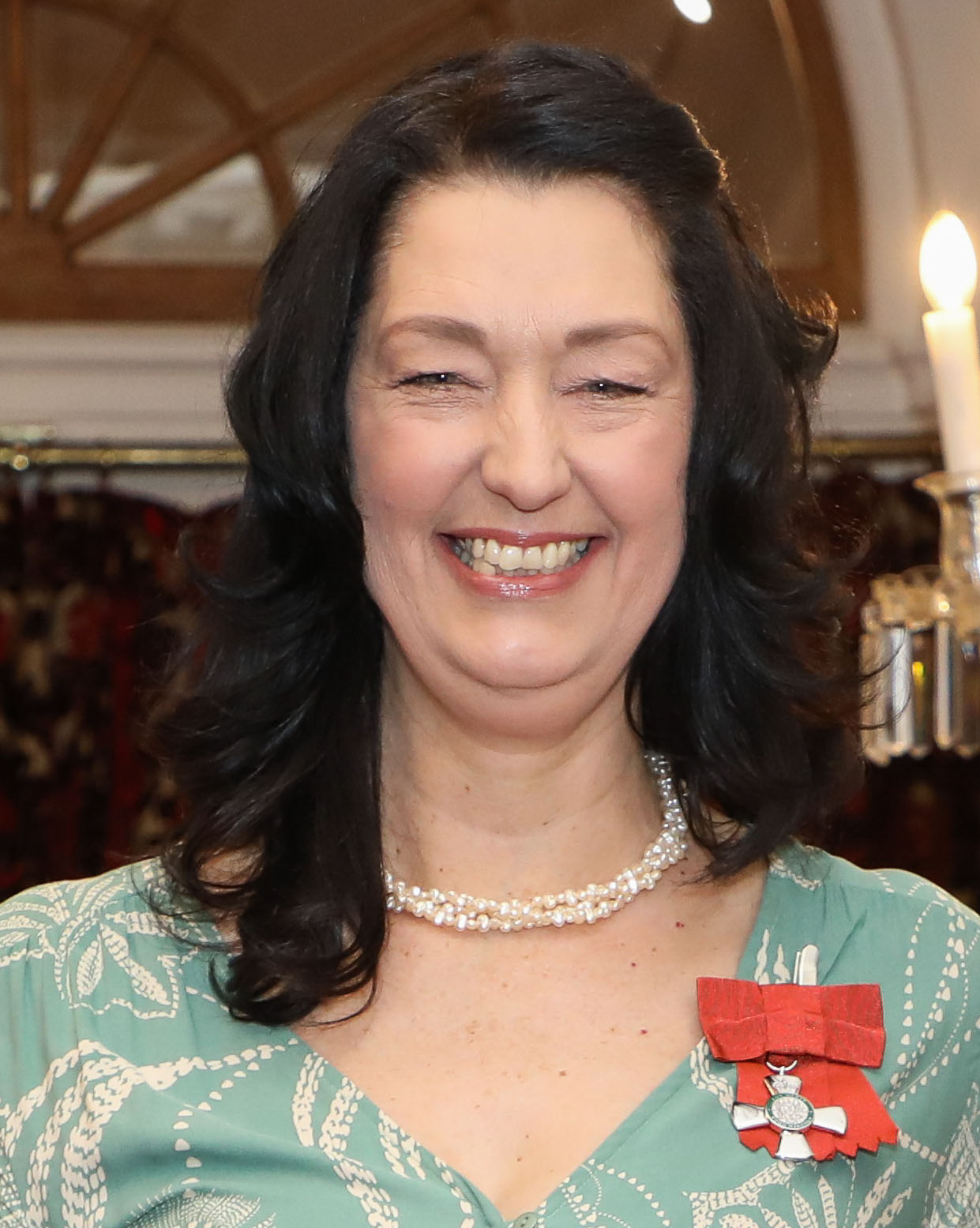
Chris Duggan

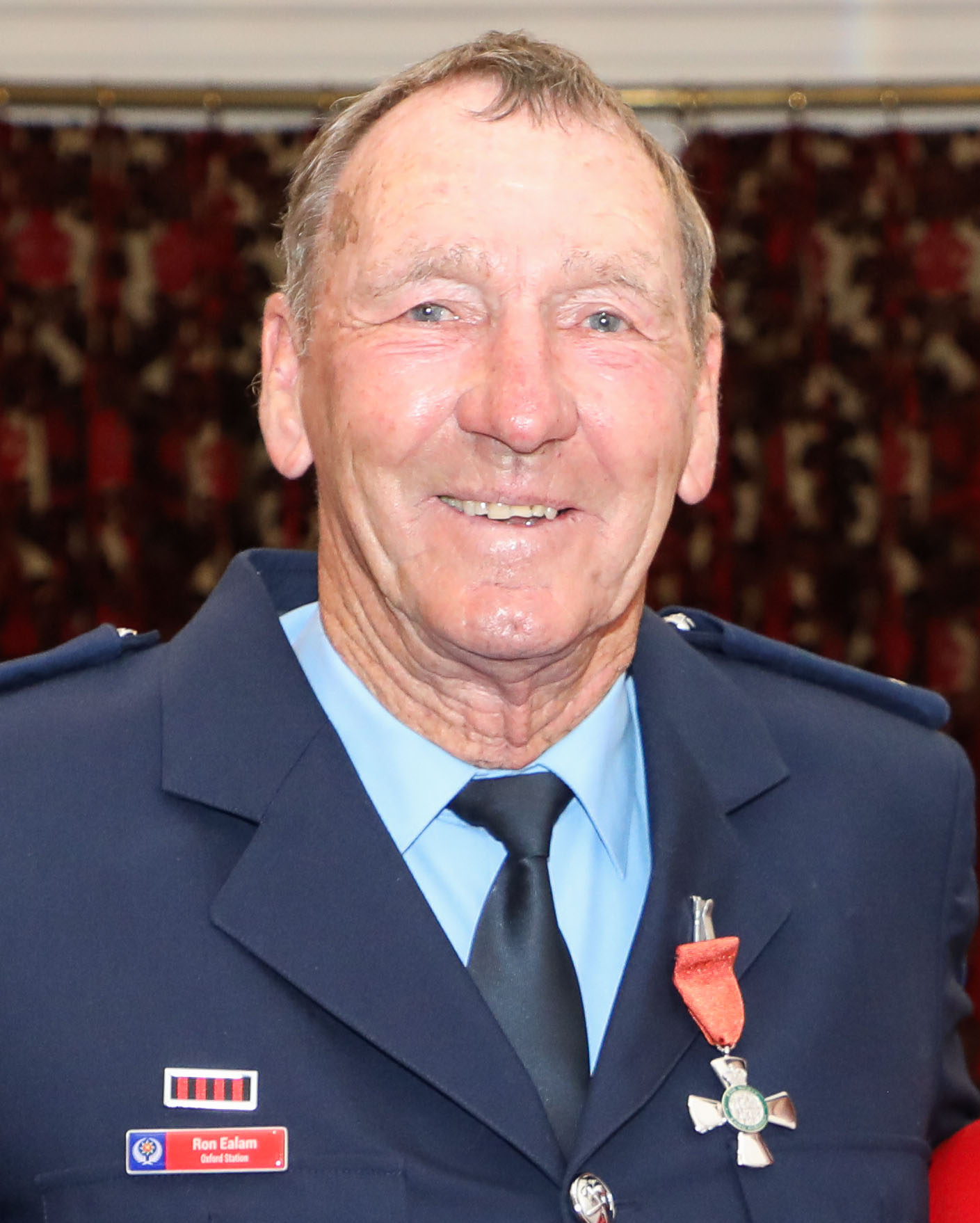
Ron Ealam

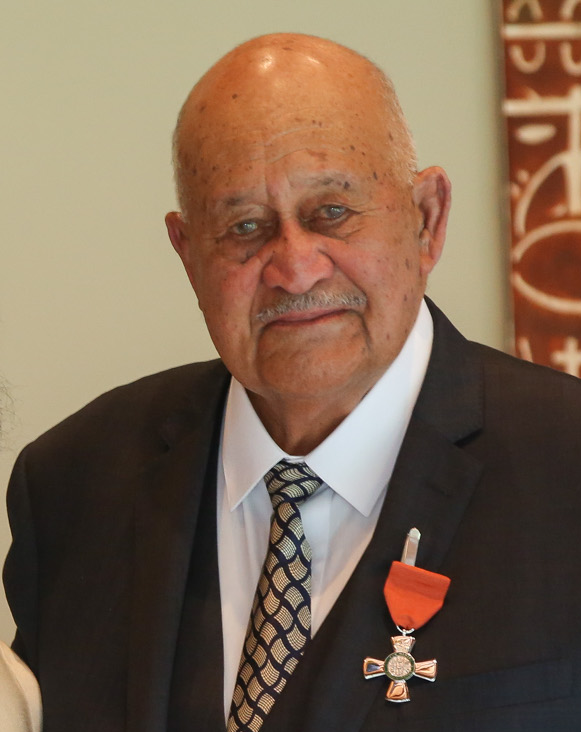
Robert Edwards

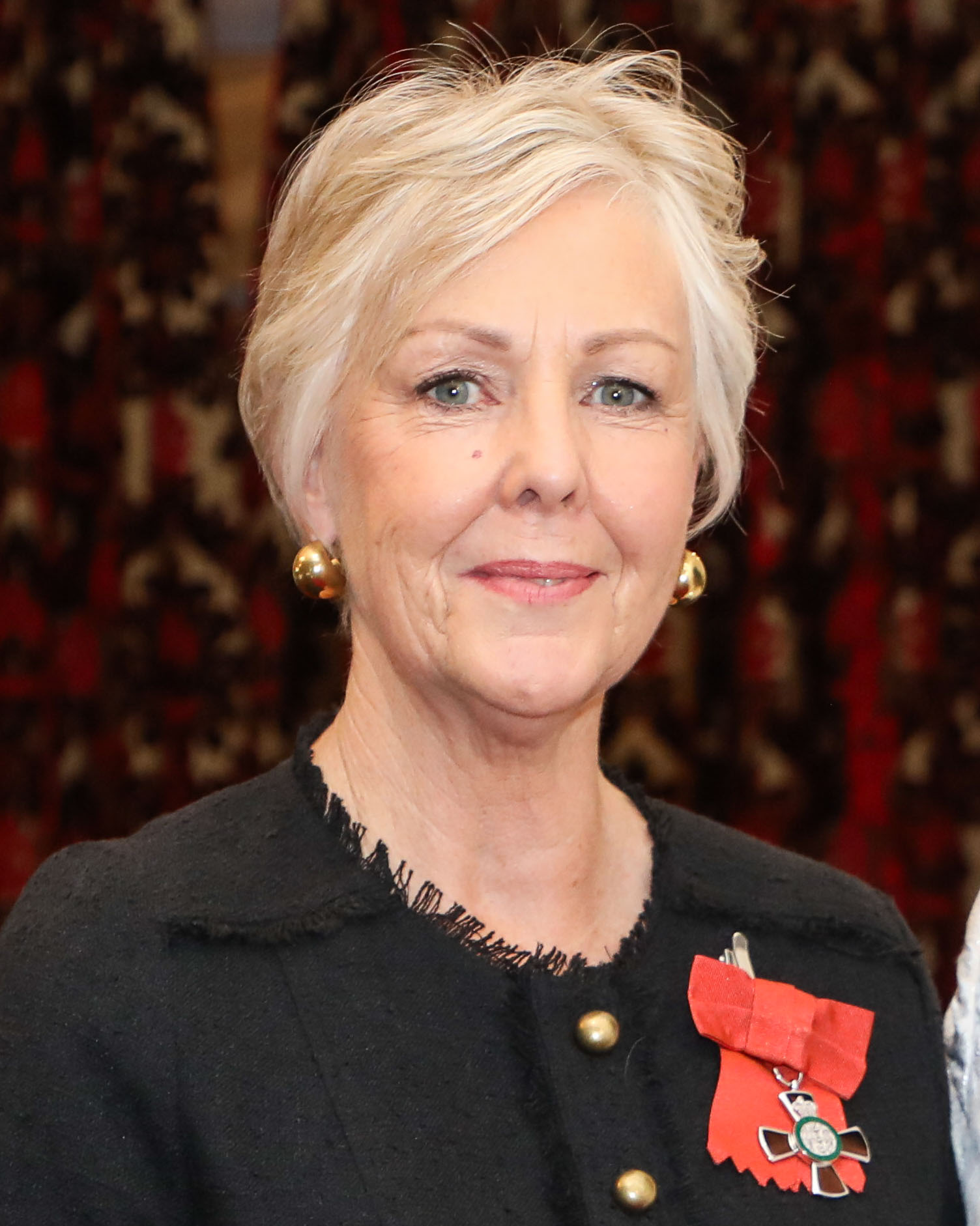
Sue Elley

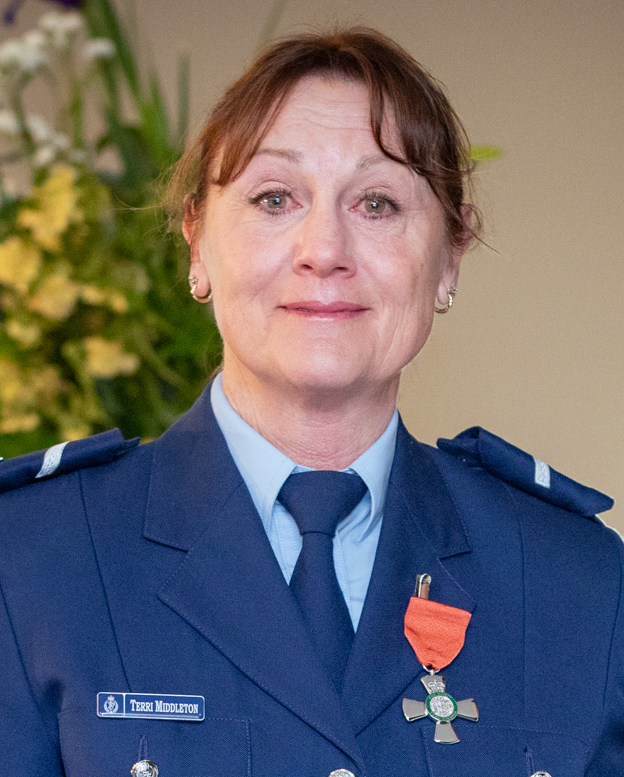
Terri Middleton

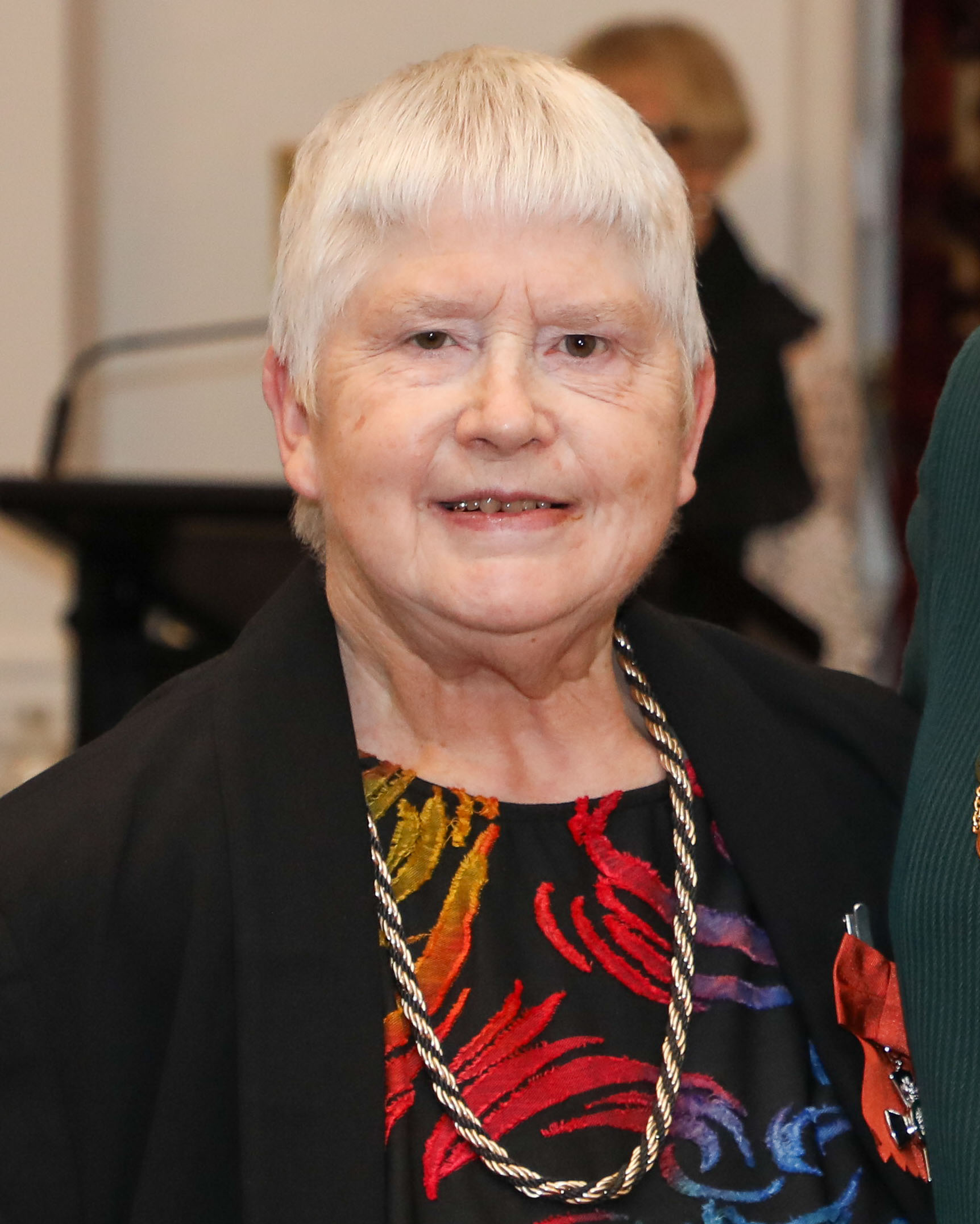
Allison Franklin

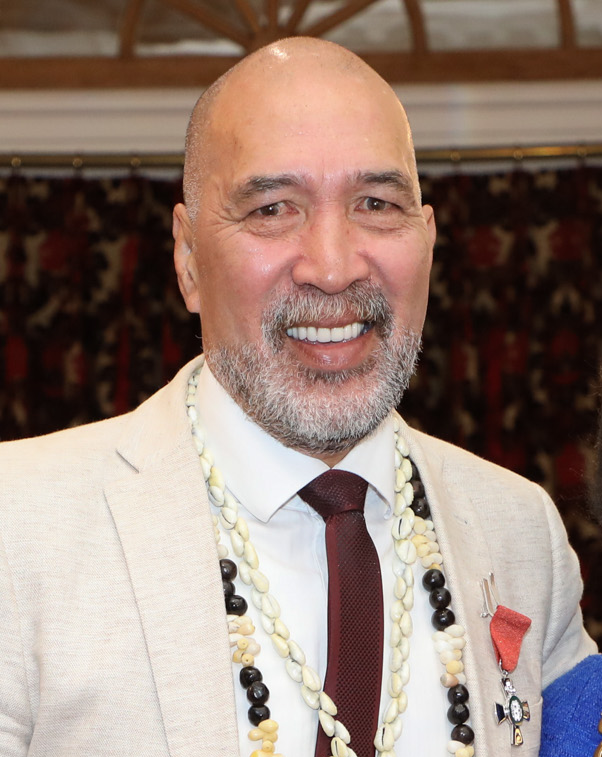
Uili Galo

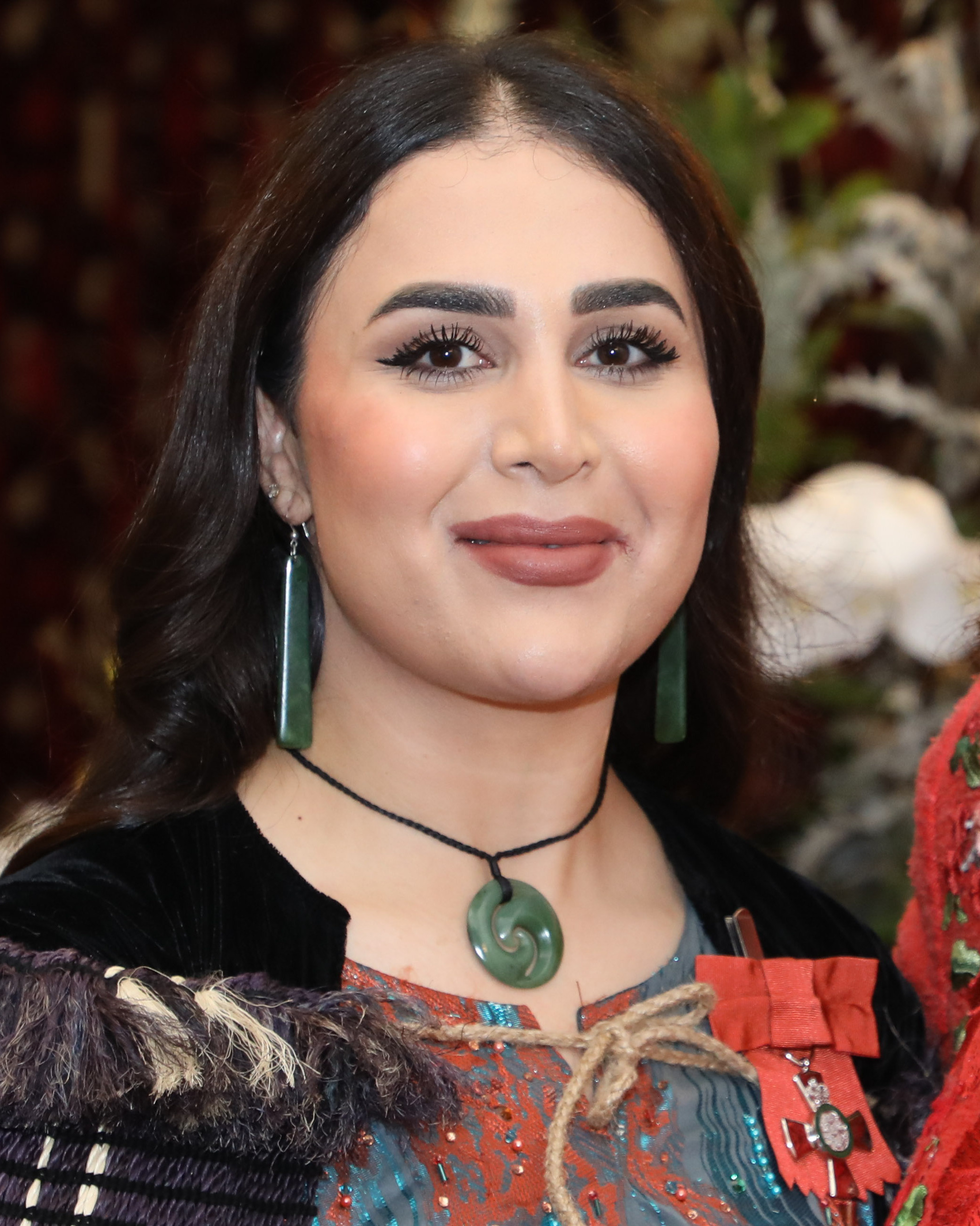
Rez Gardi

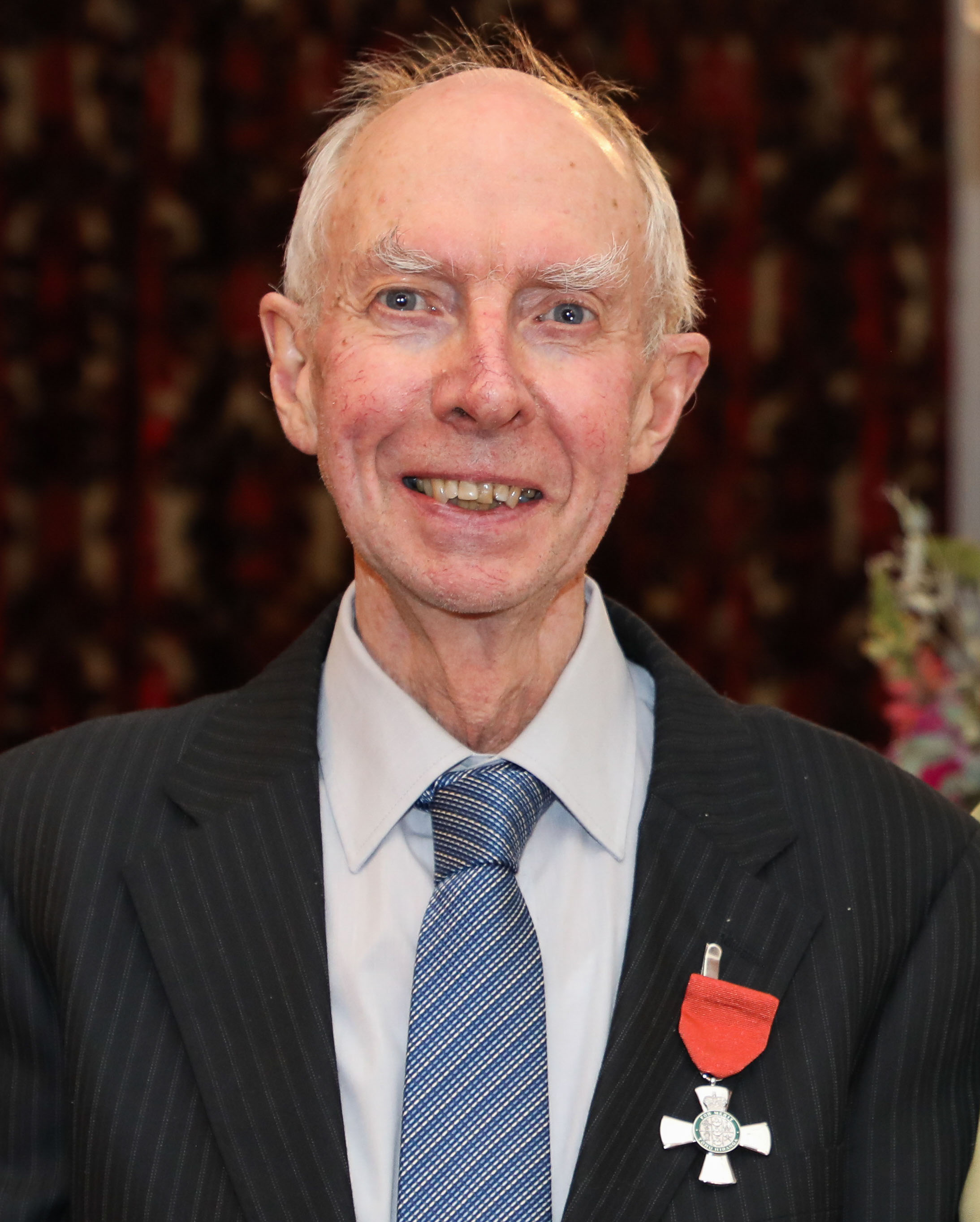
Alan Gilmore

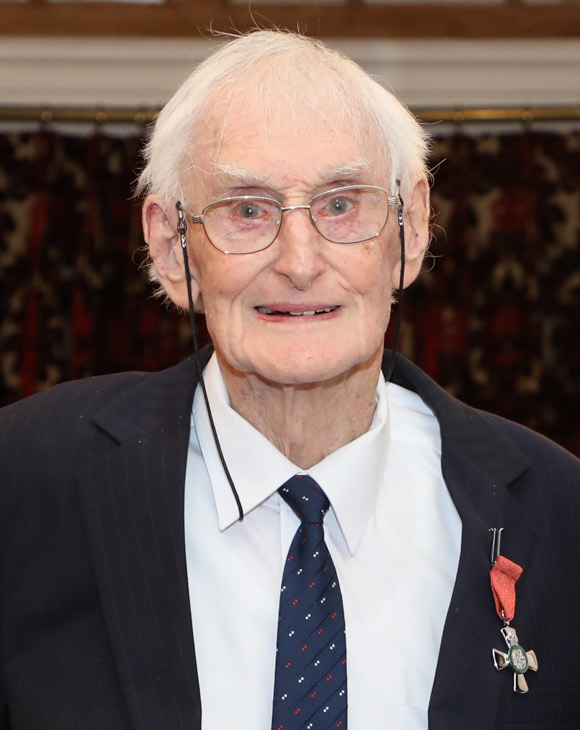
Frank Goldingham

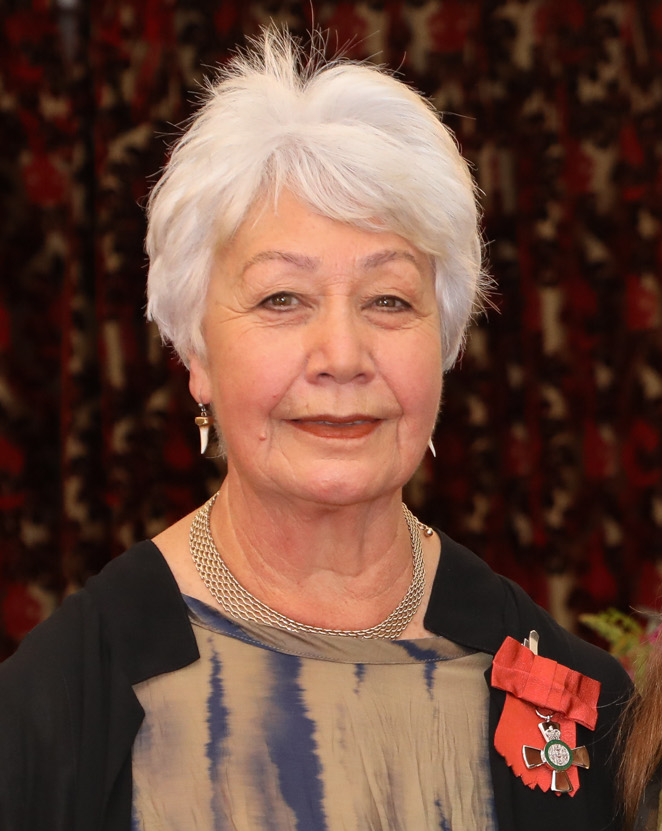
Liz Graham

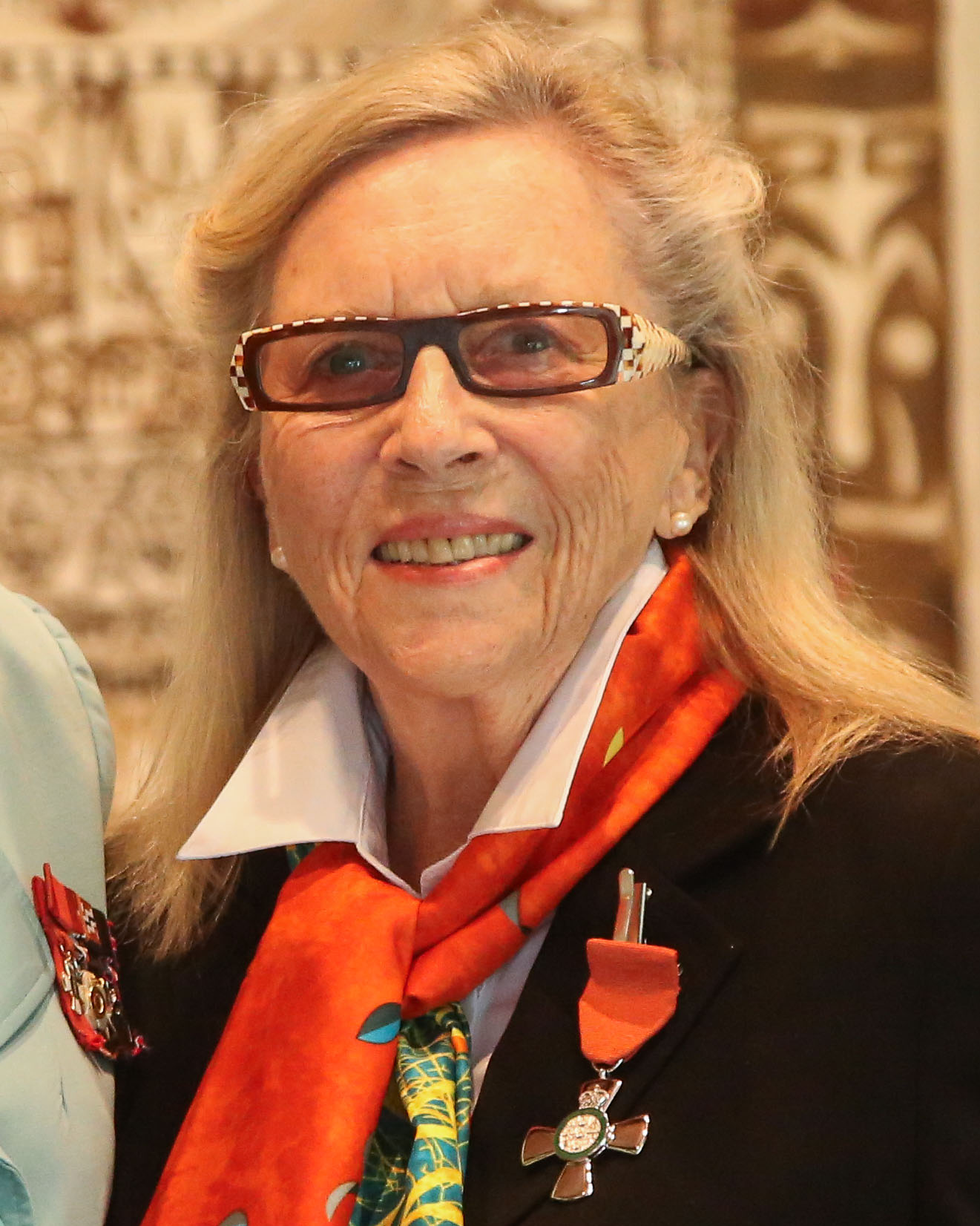
Trish Gregory

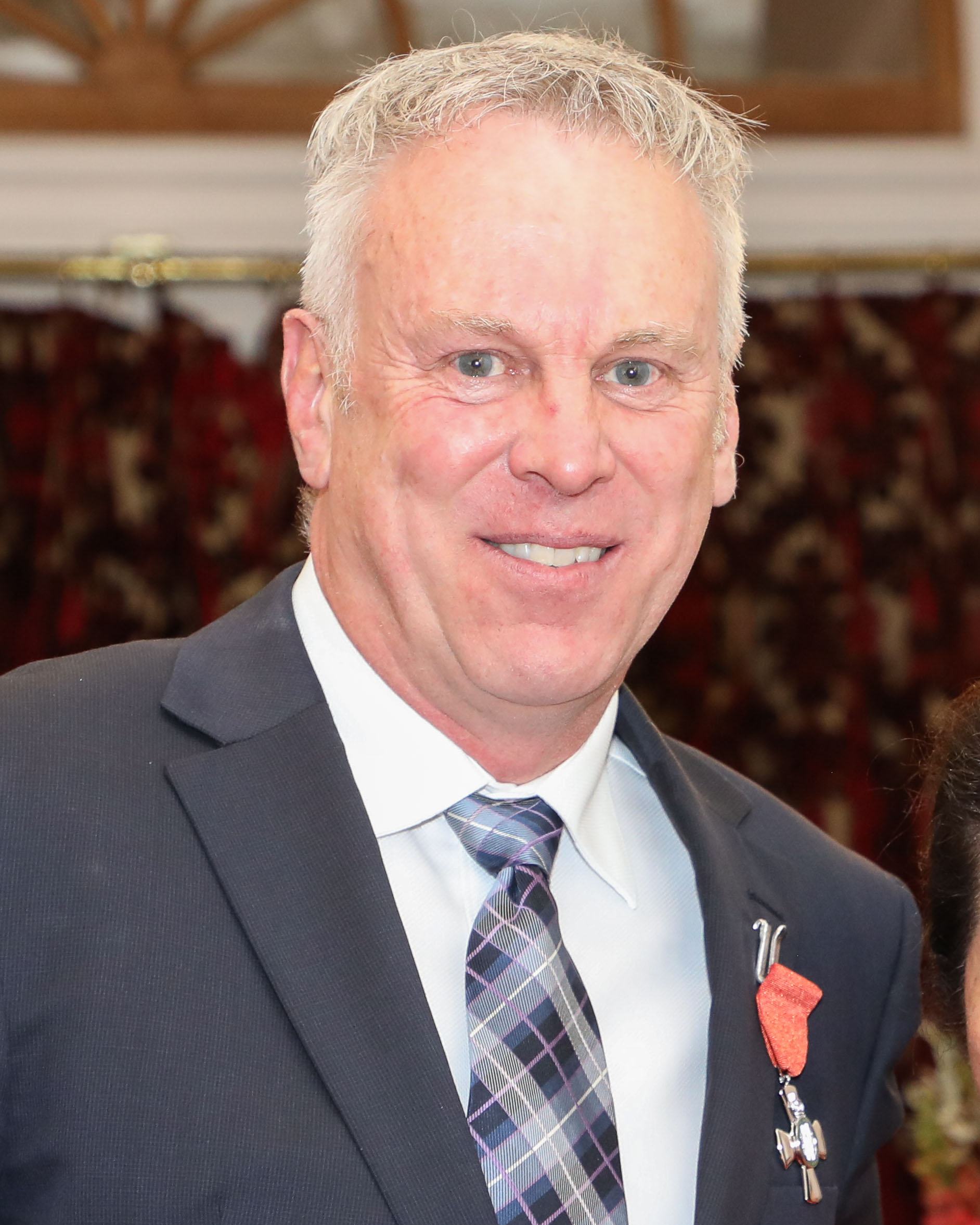
Aaron Halstead

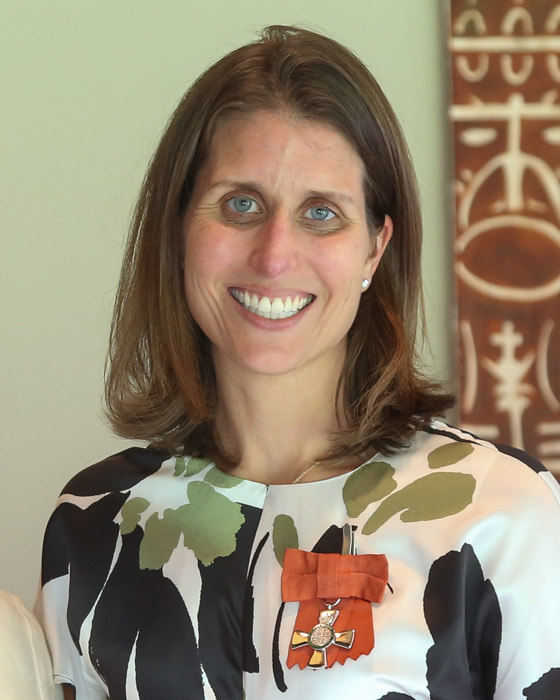
Nina Hood

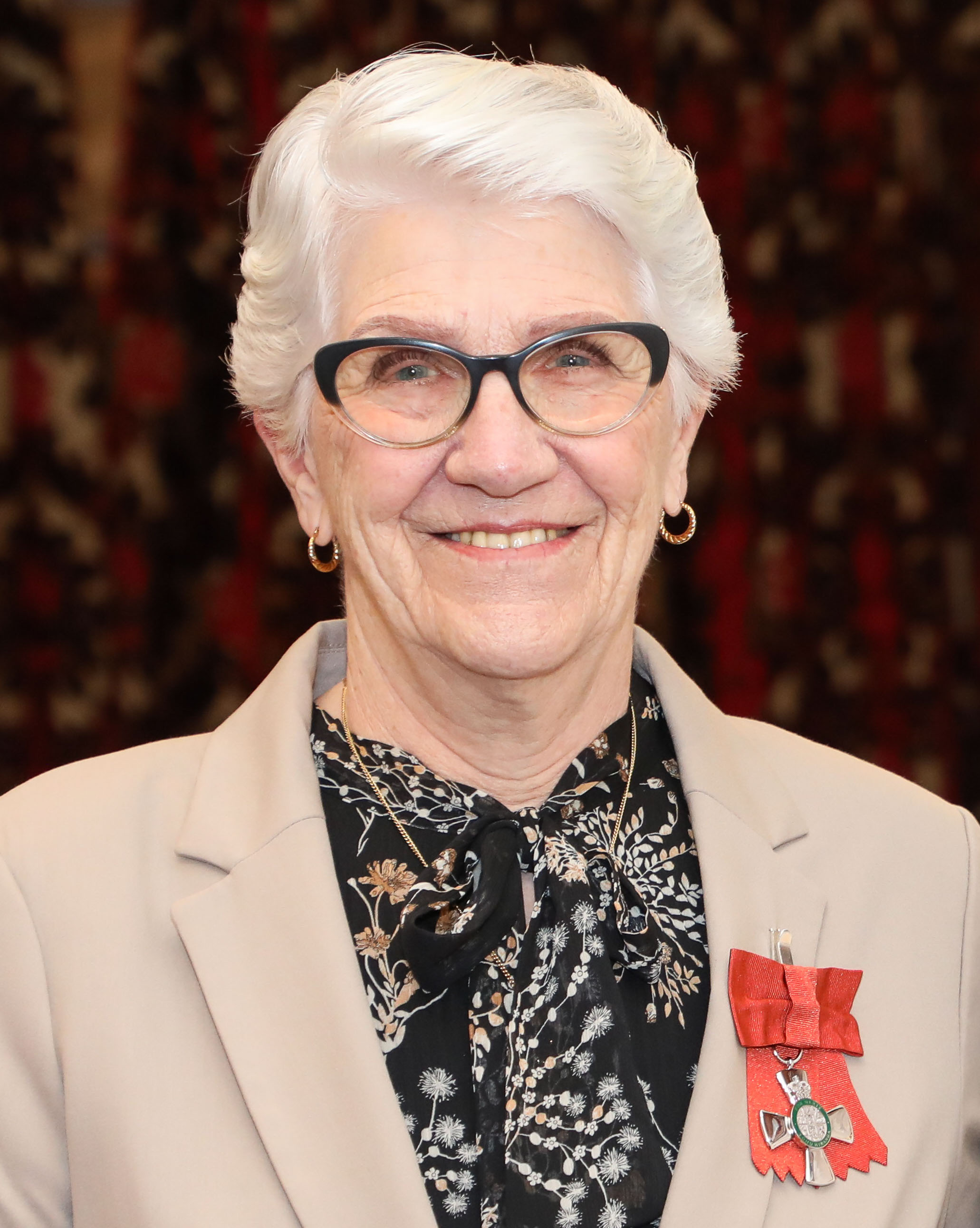
Lesley Huckins

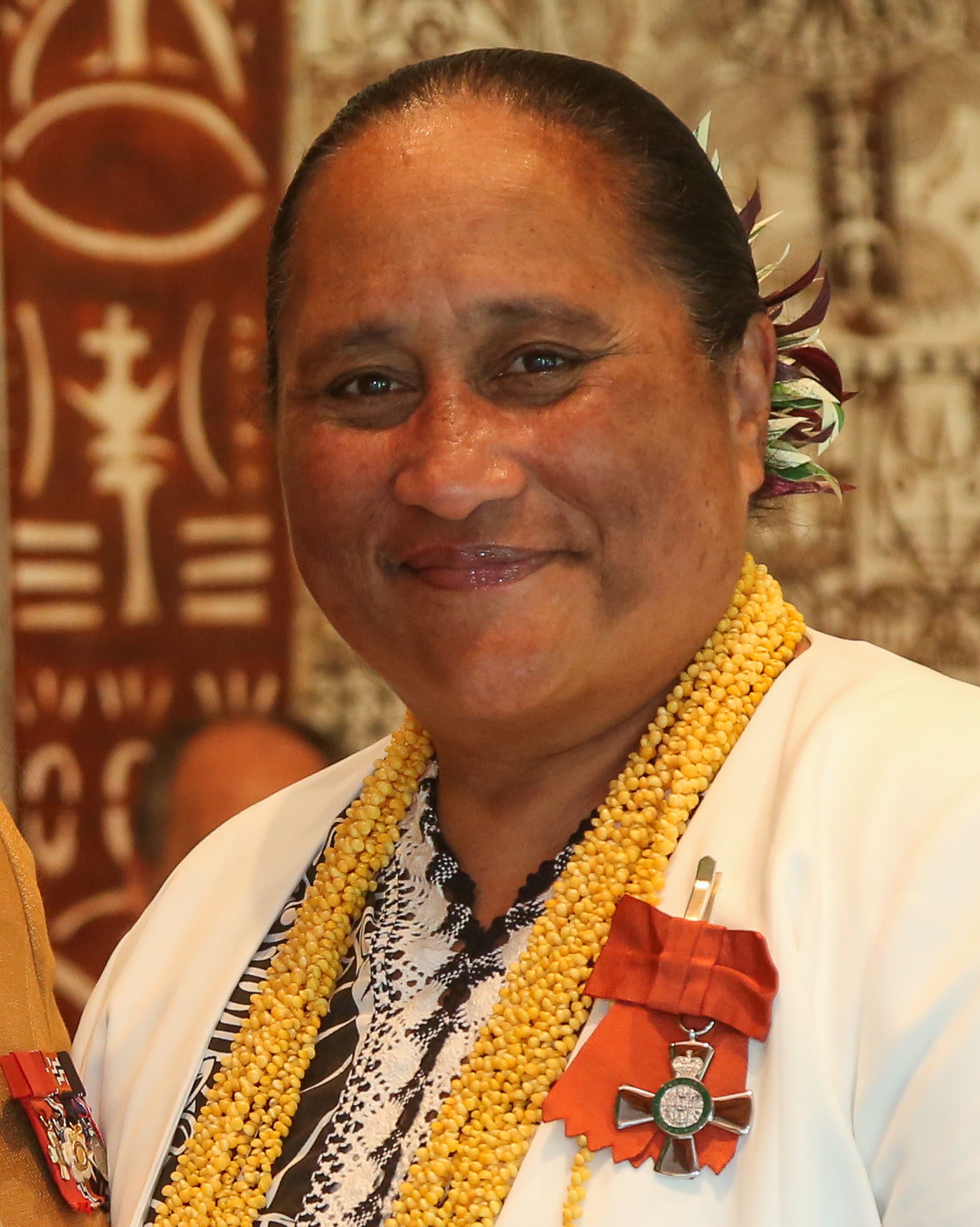
Meleua Ikiua

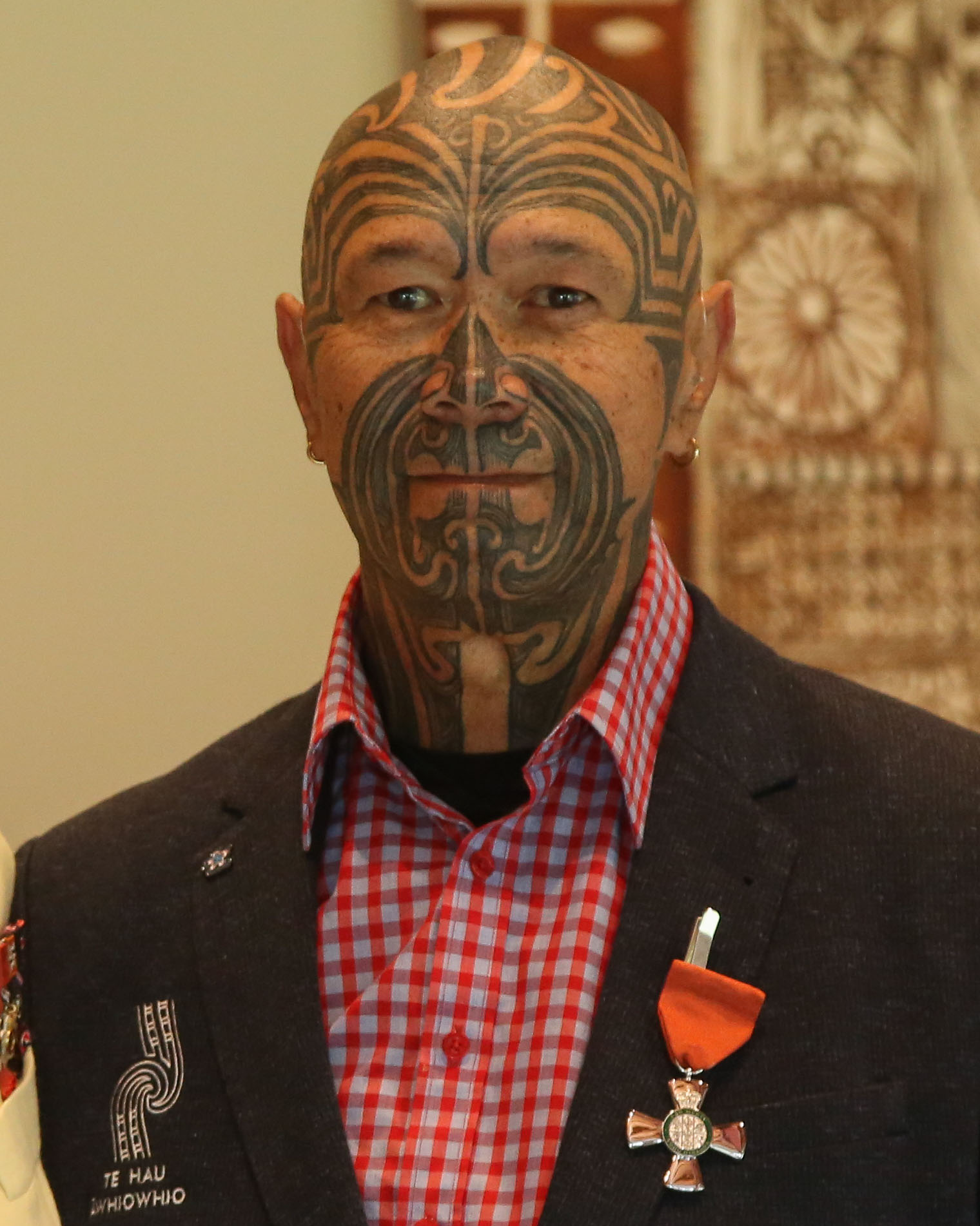
Martin Kaipo

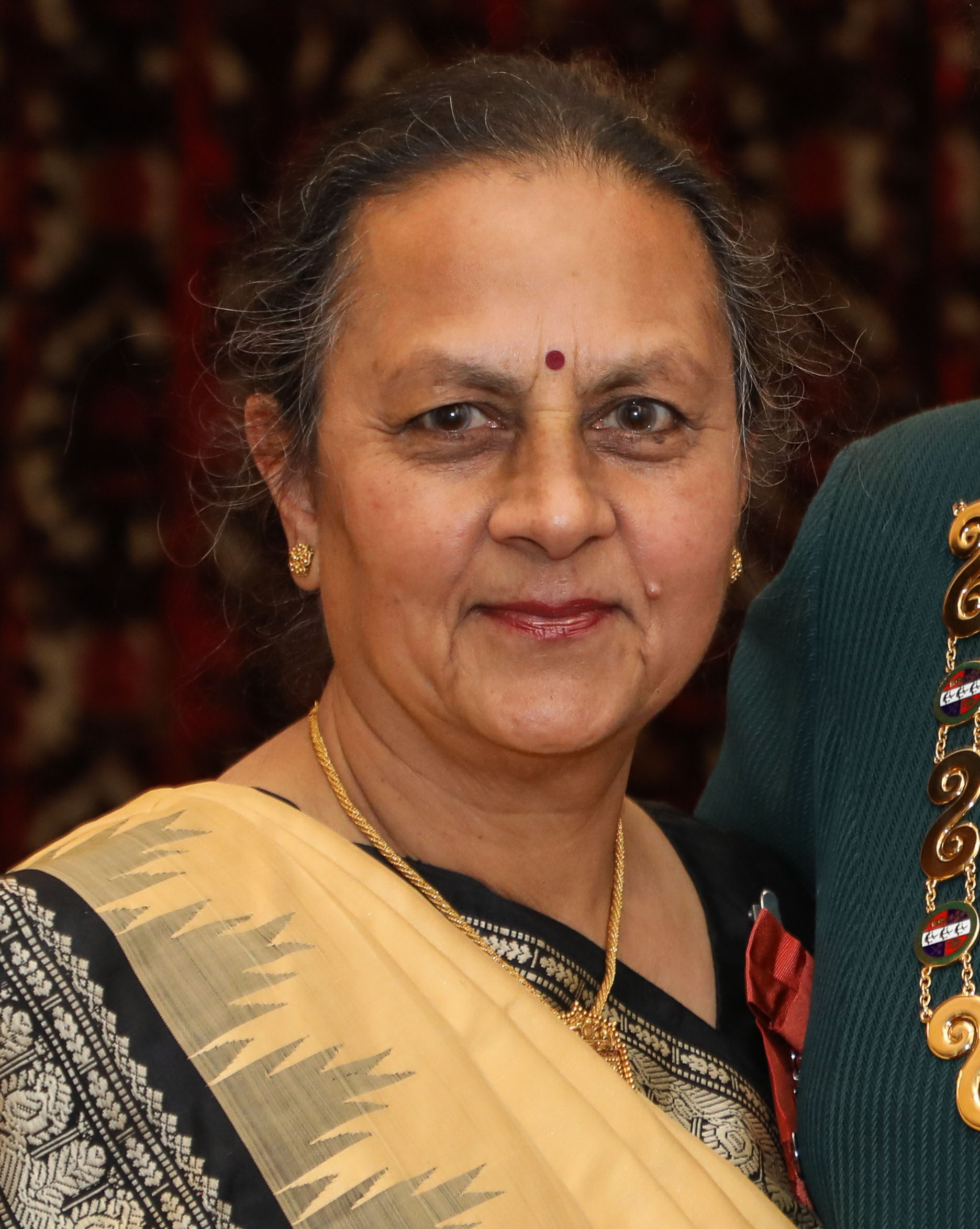
Lalita Kasanji

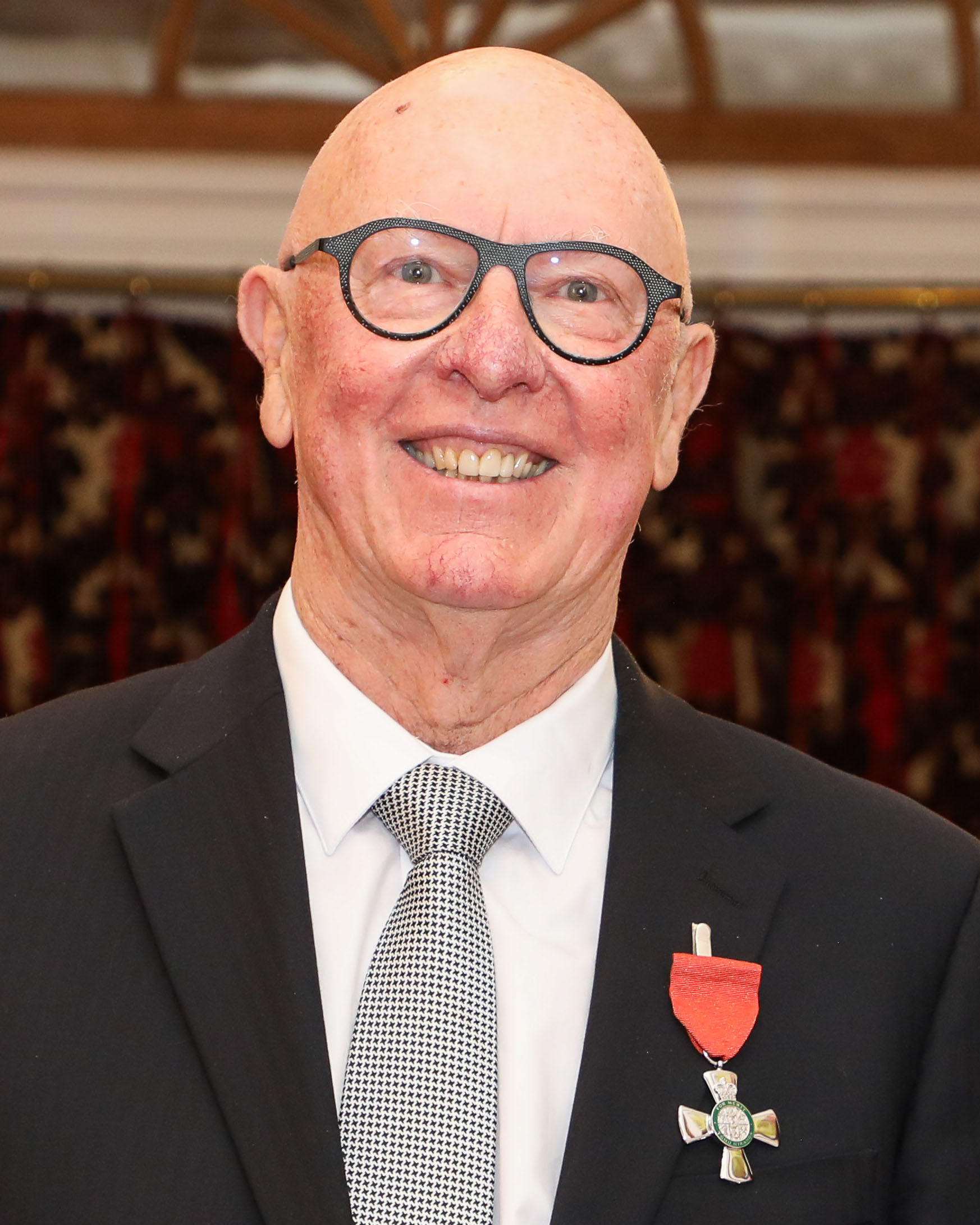
Brian Kelly

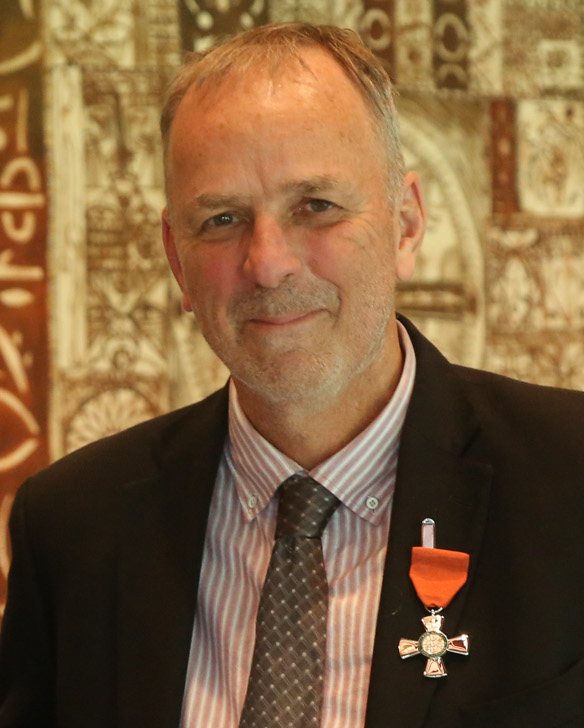
Bill Kermode

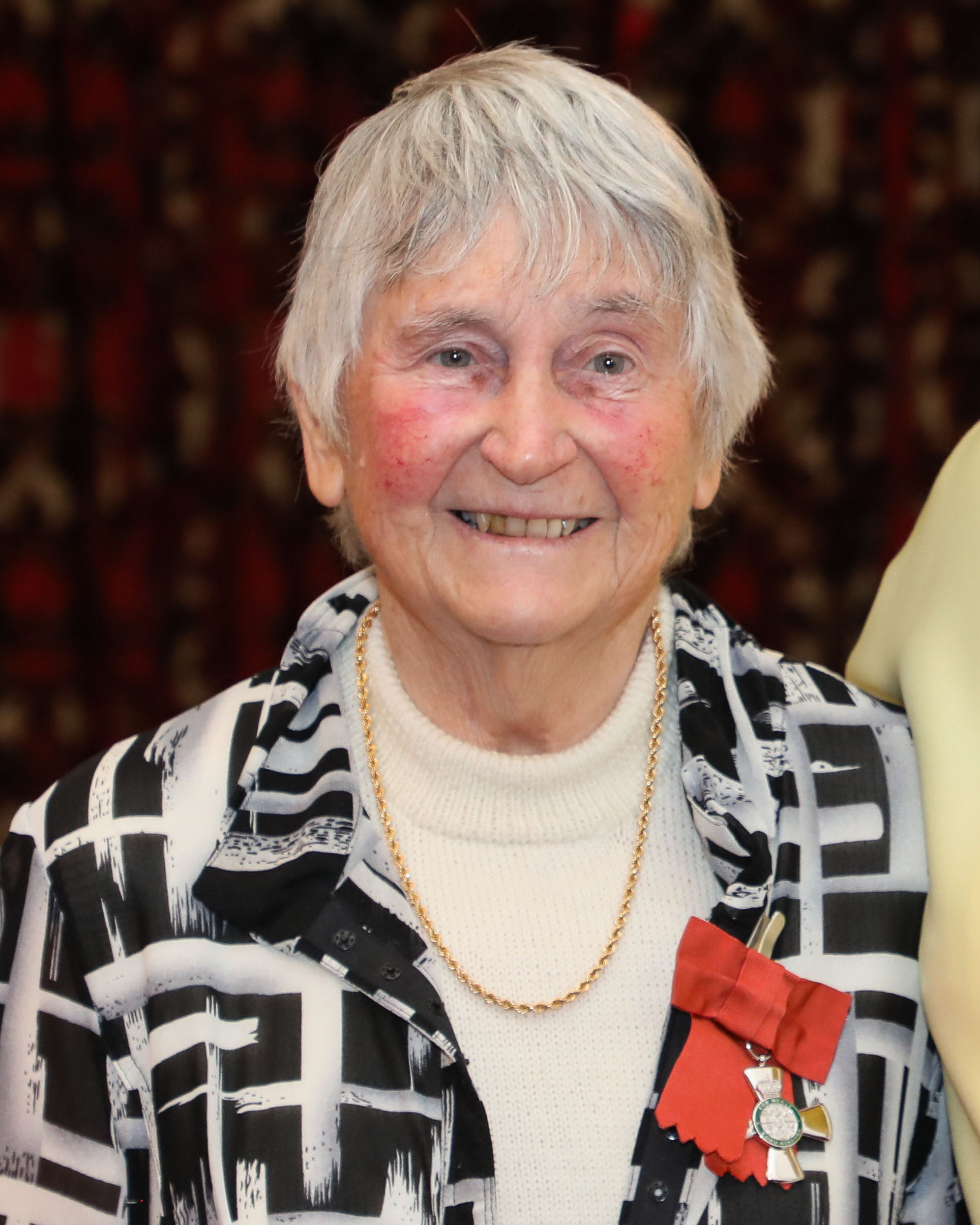
Pamela Kilmartin

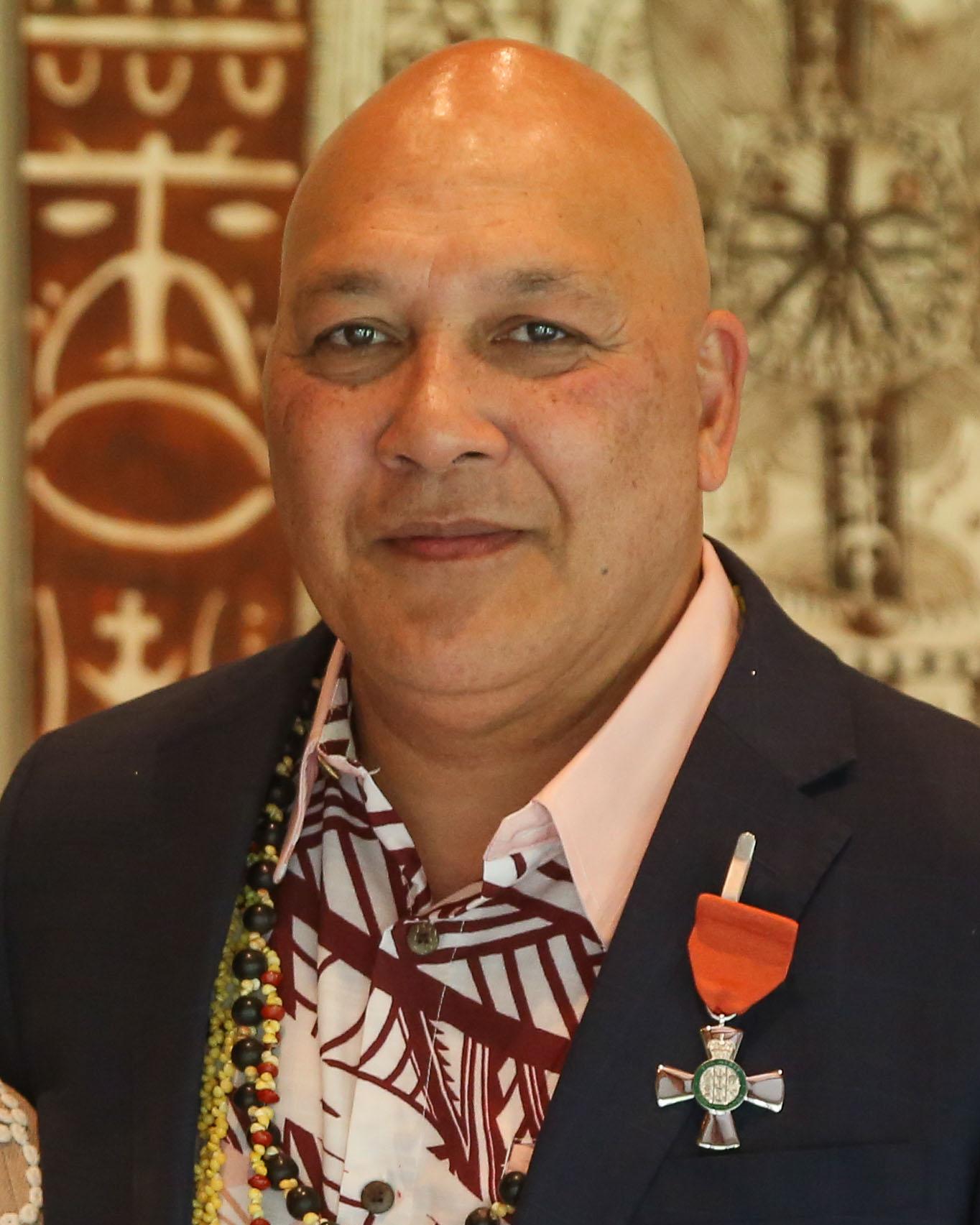
Johnny Kumitau

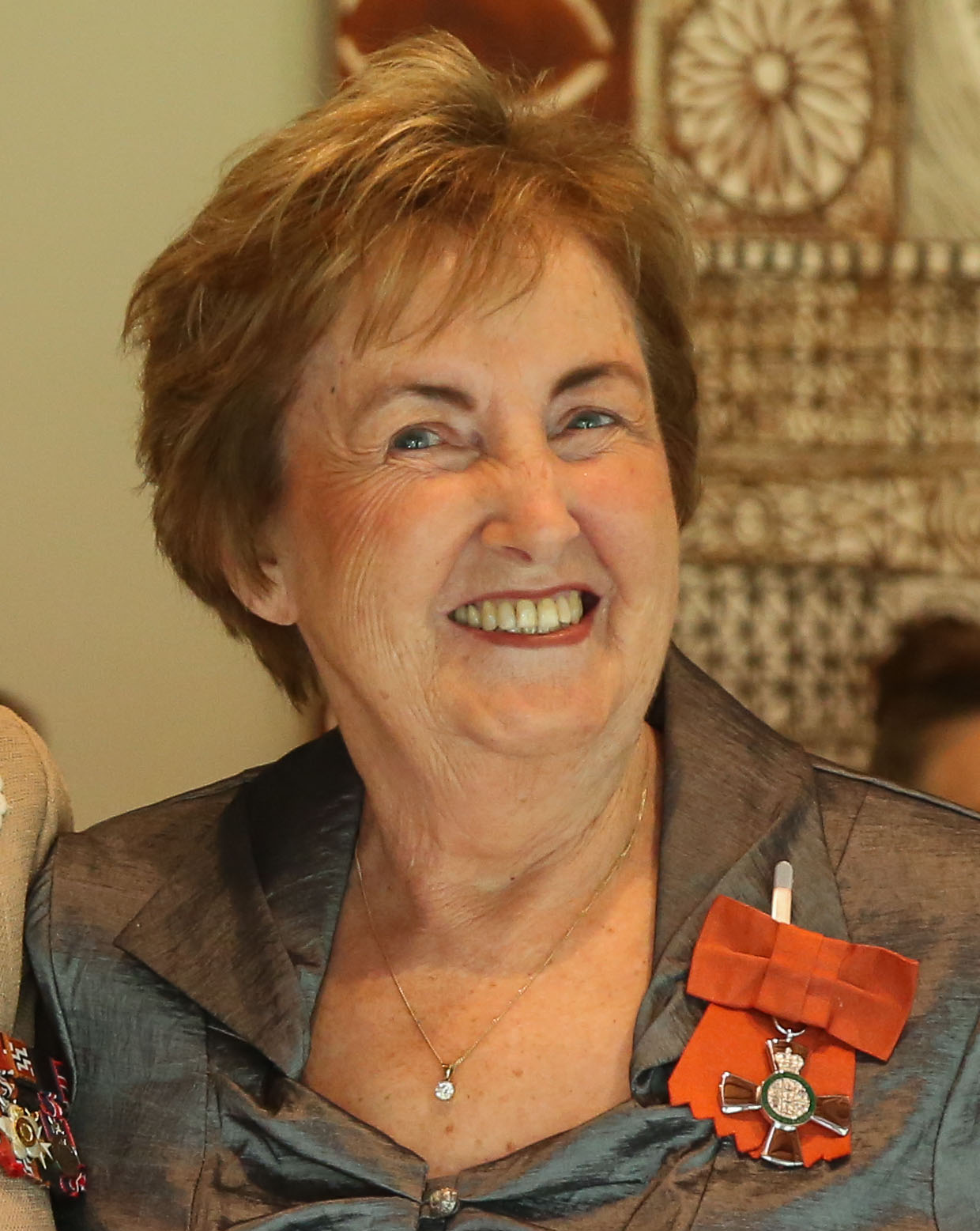
Laurinne Laing

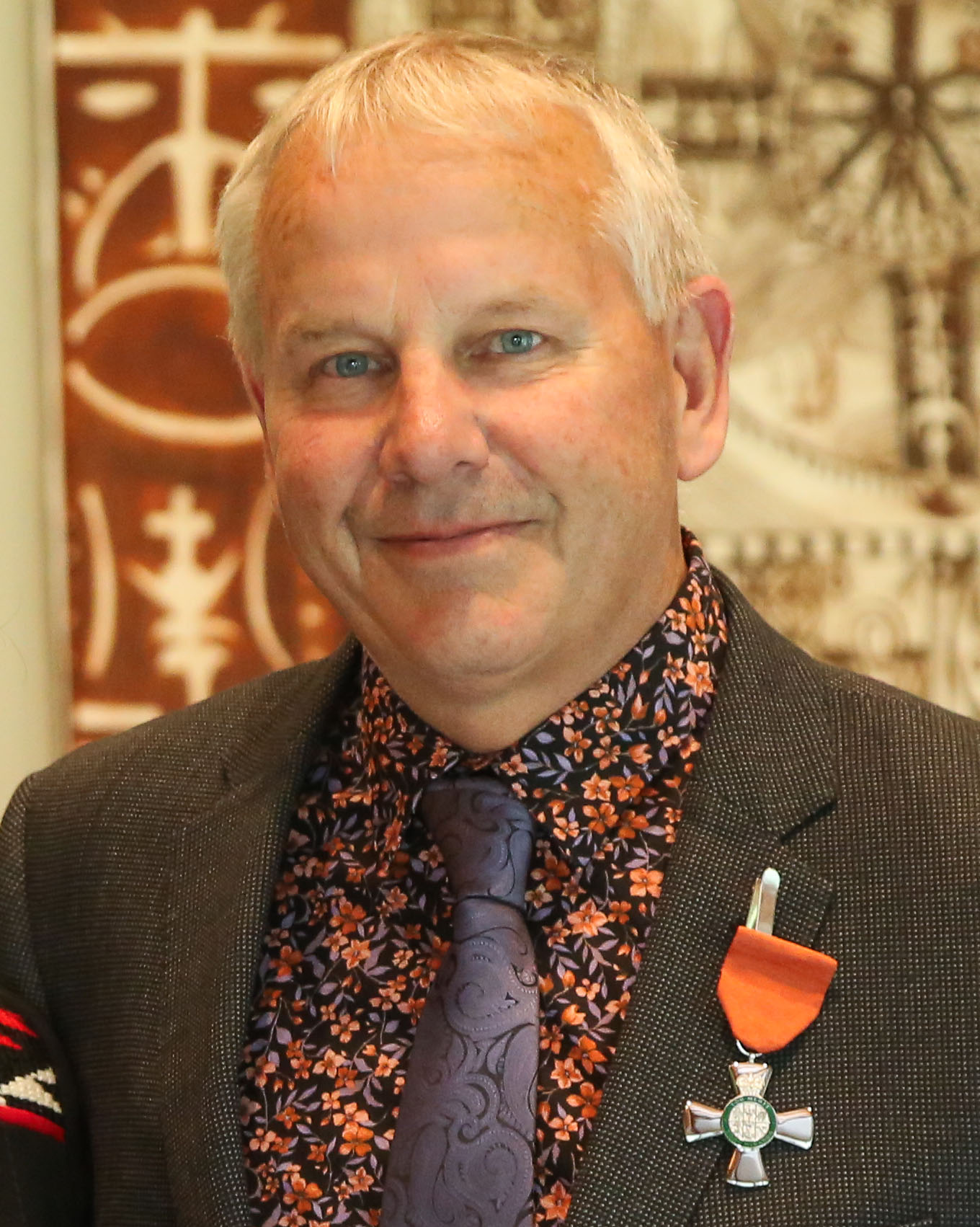
Ross Lawrence

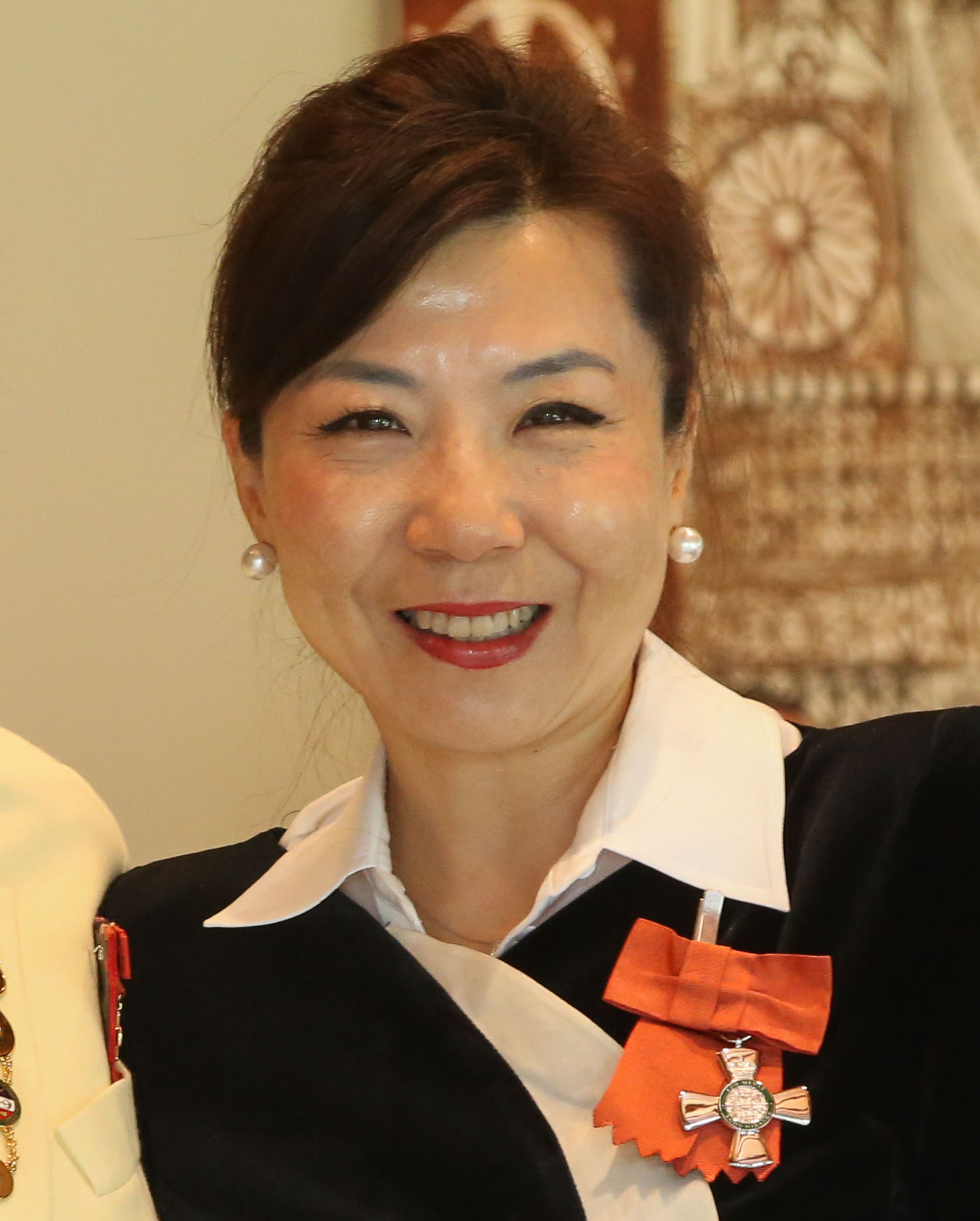
Lisa Li

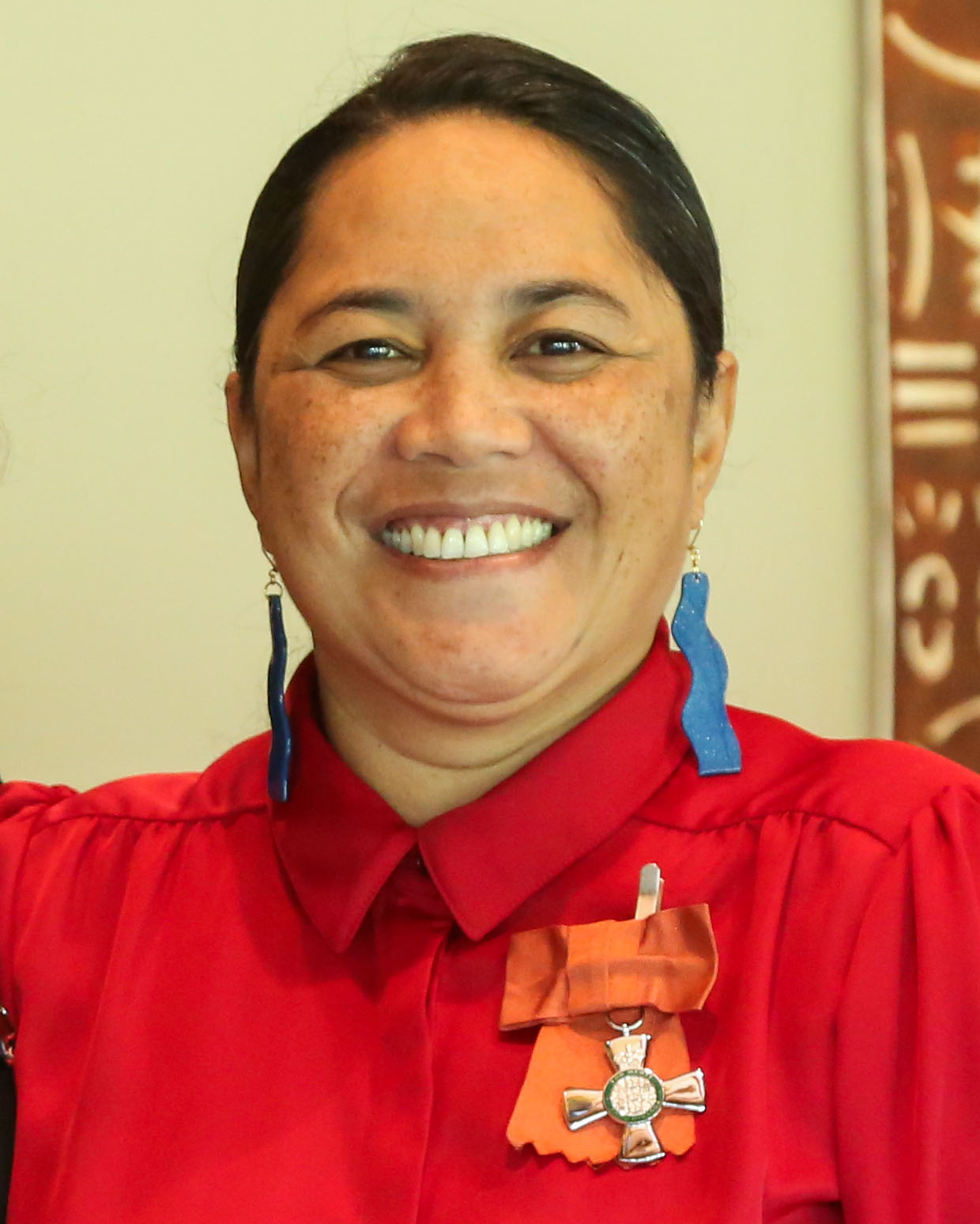
Janet Lilo

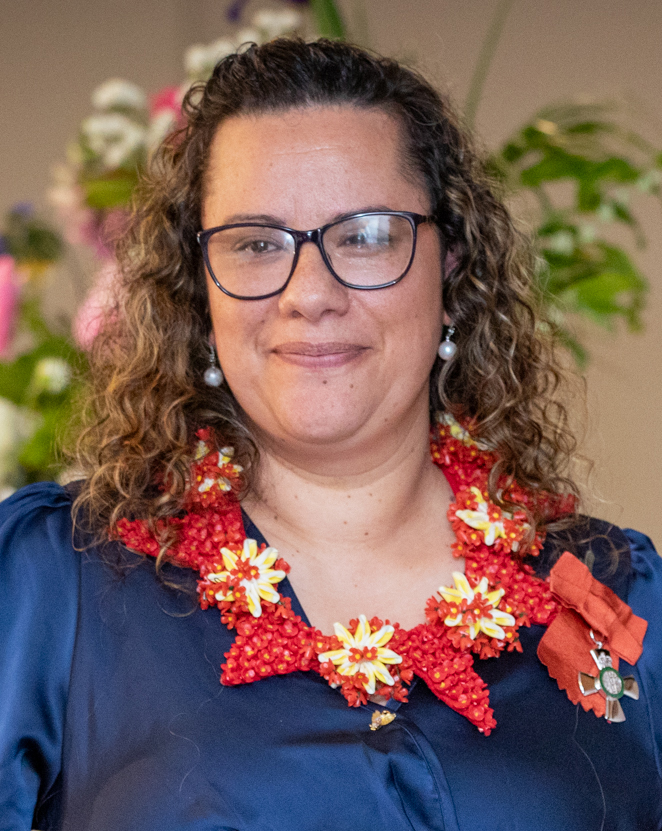
Pauline Luyten

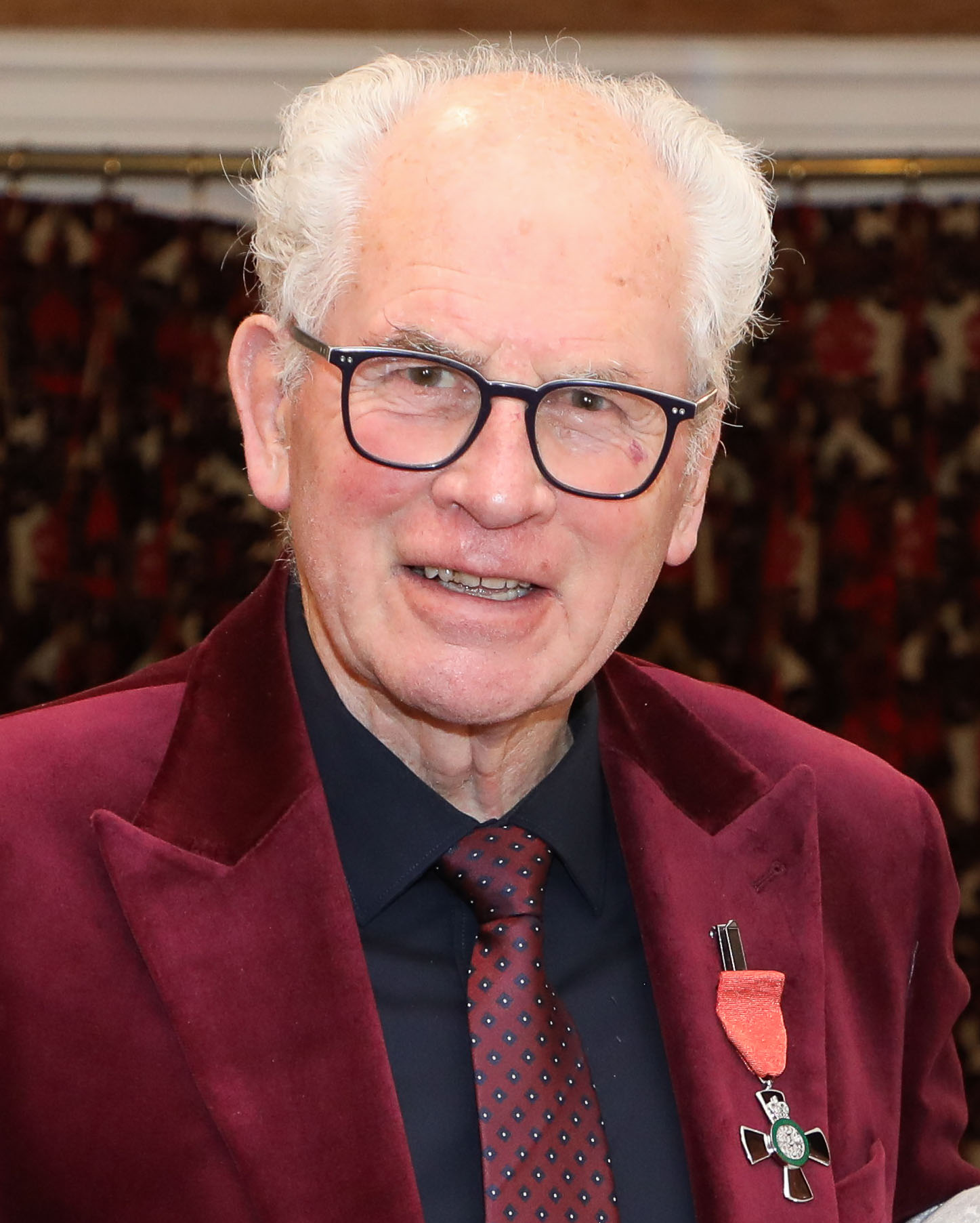
David Major

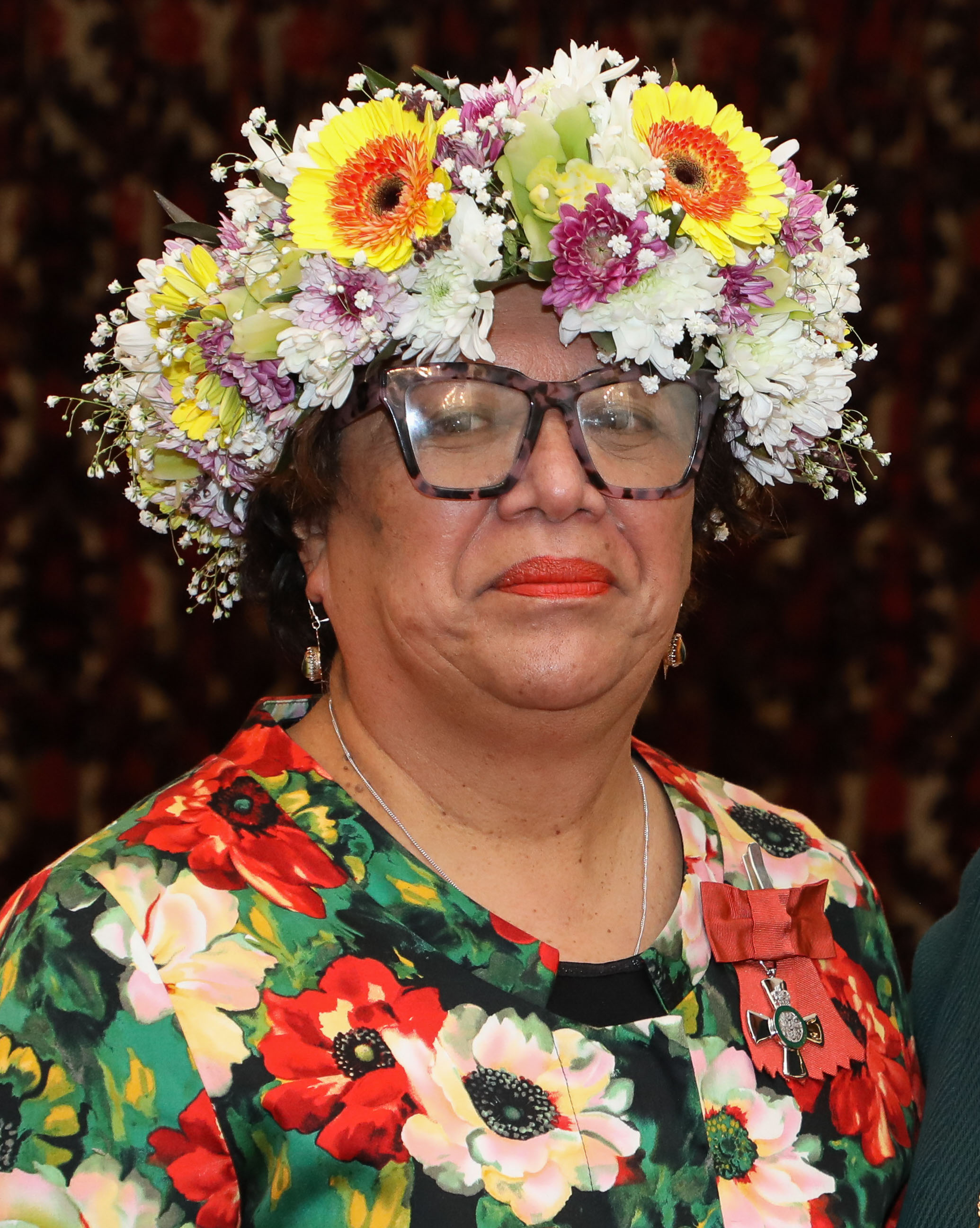
Ngatepaeru Marsters

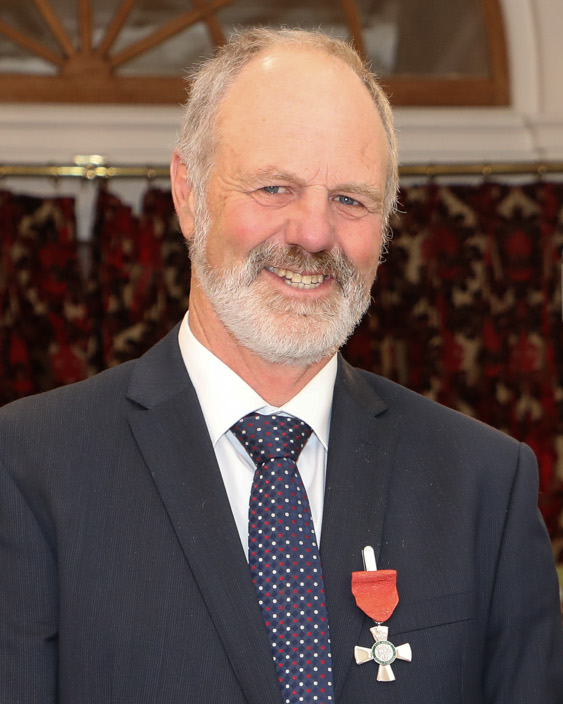
Lloyd McCallum

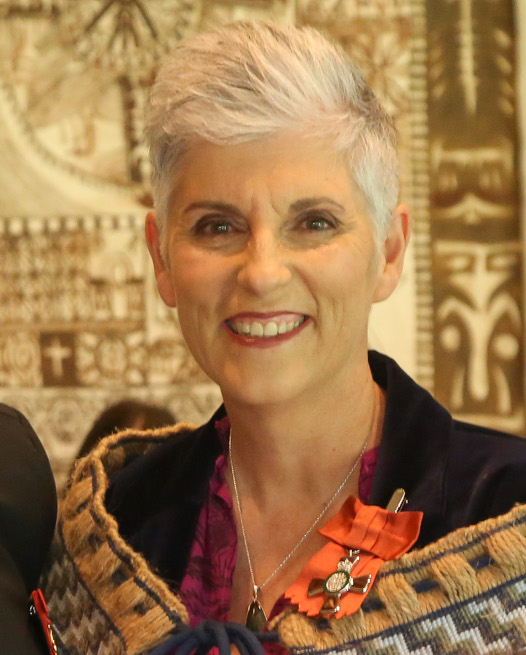
Suzanne McFadden

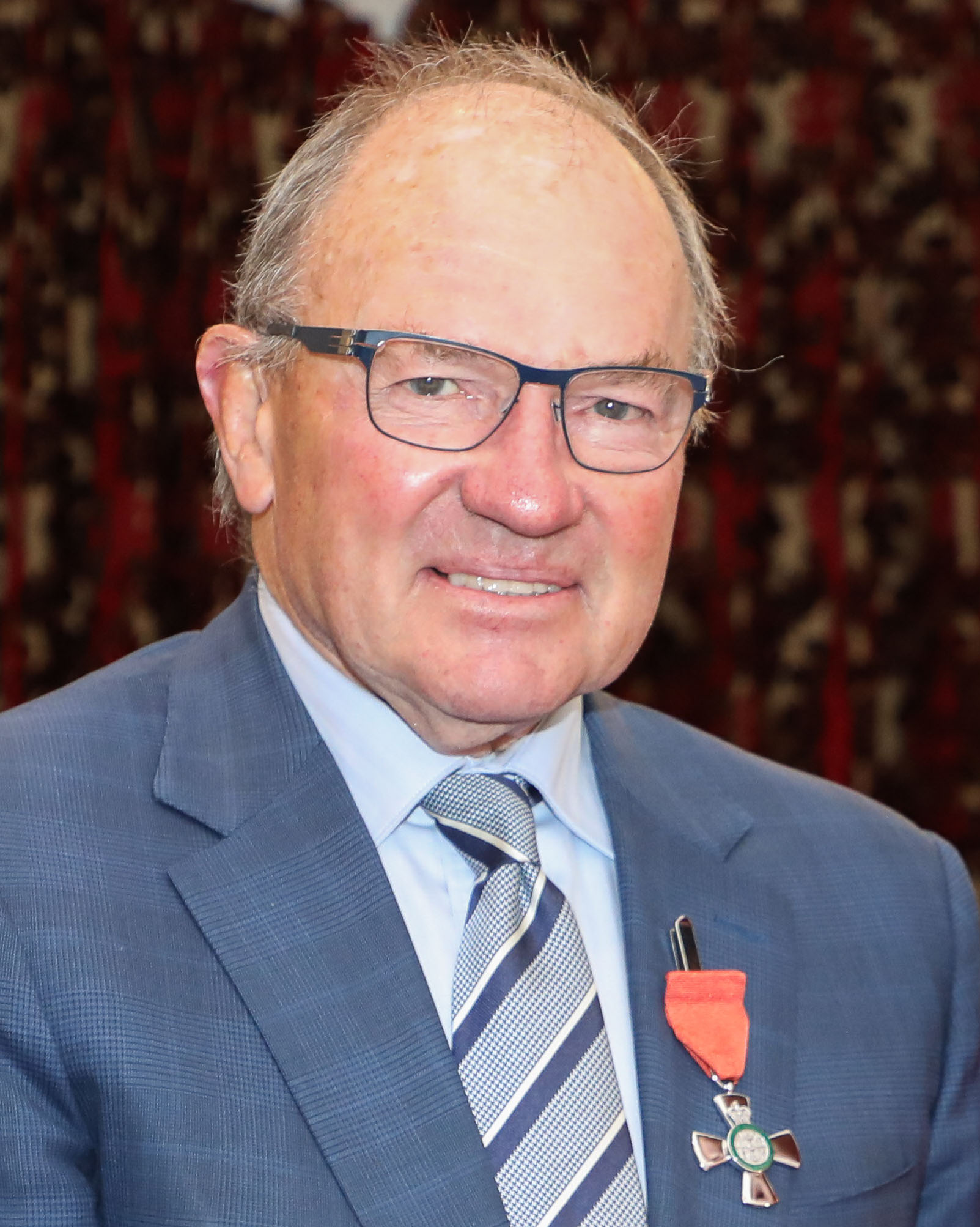
Ian McKelvie

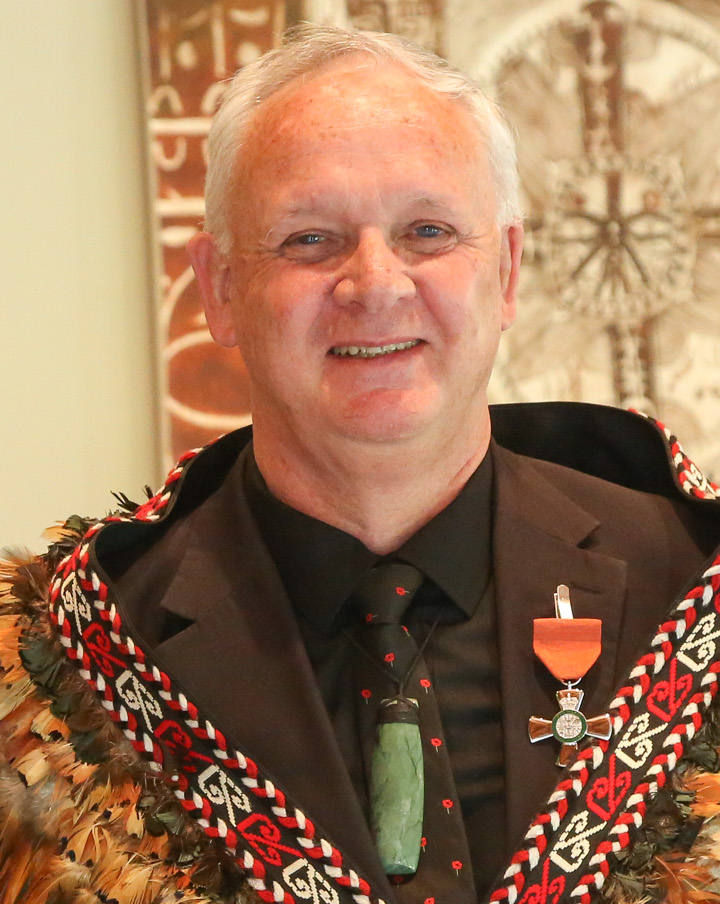
Grant McMillan

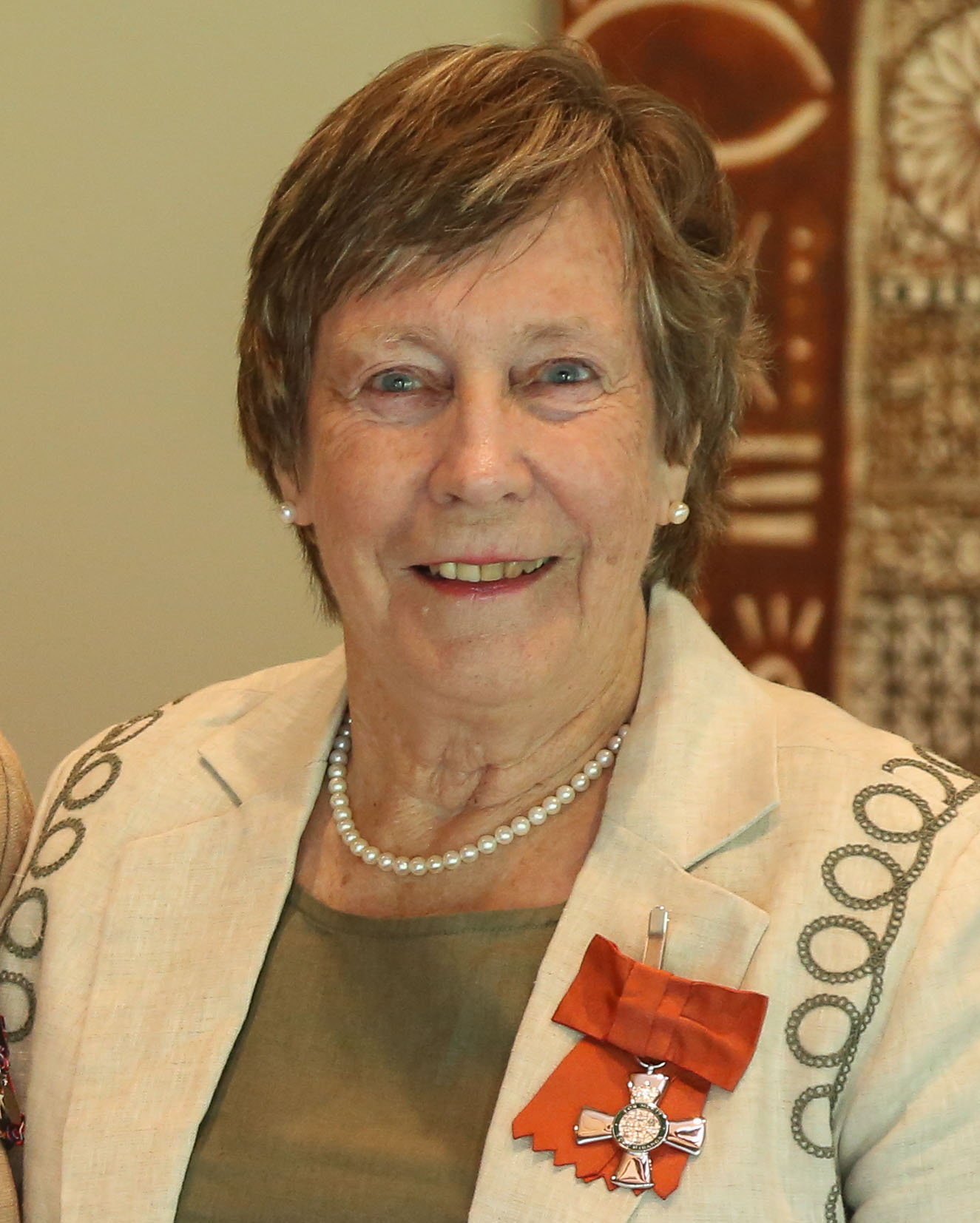
Vicky Mee

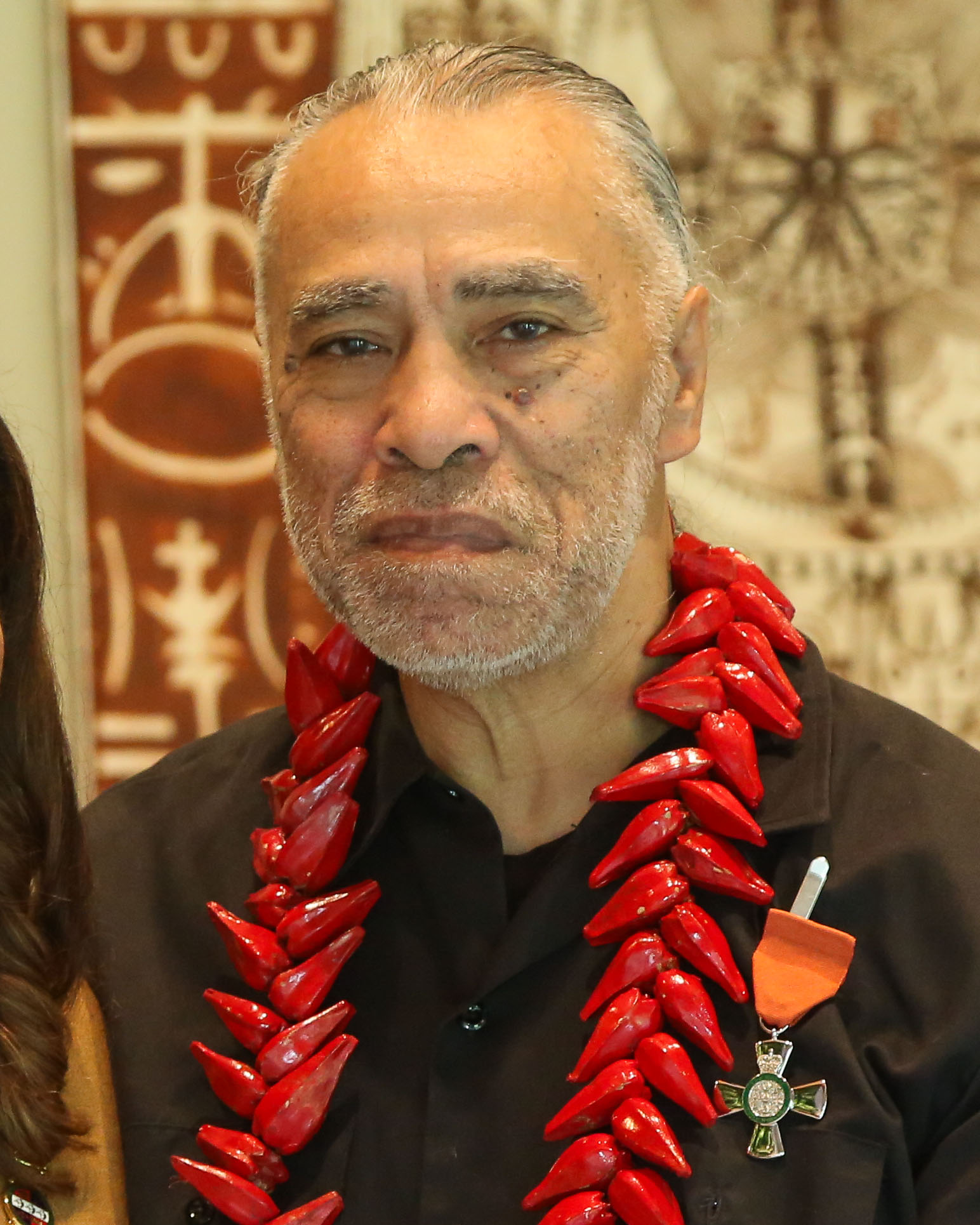
Eugene Meredith

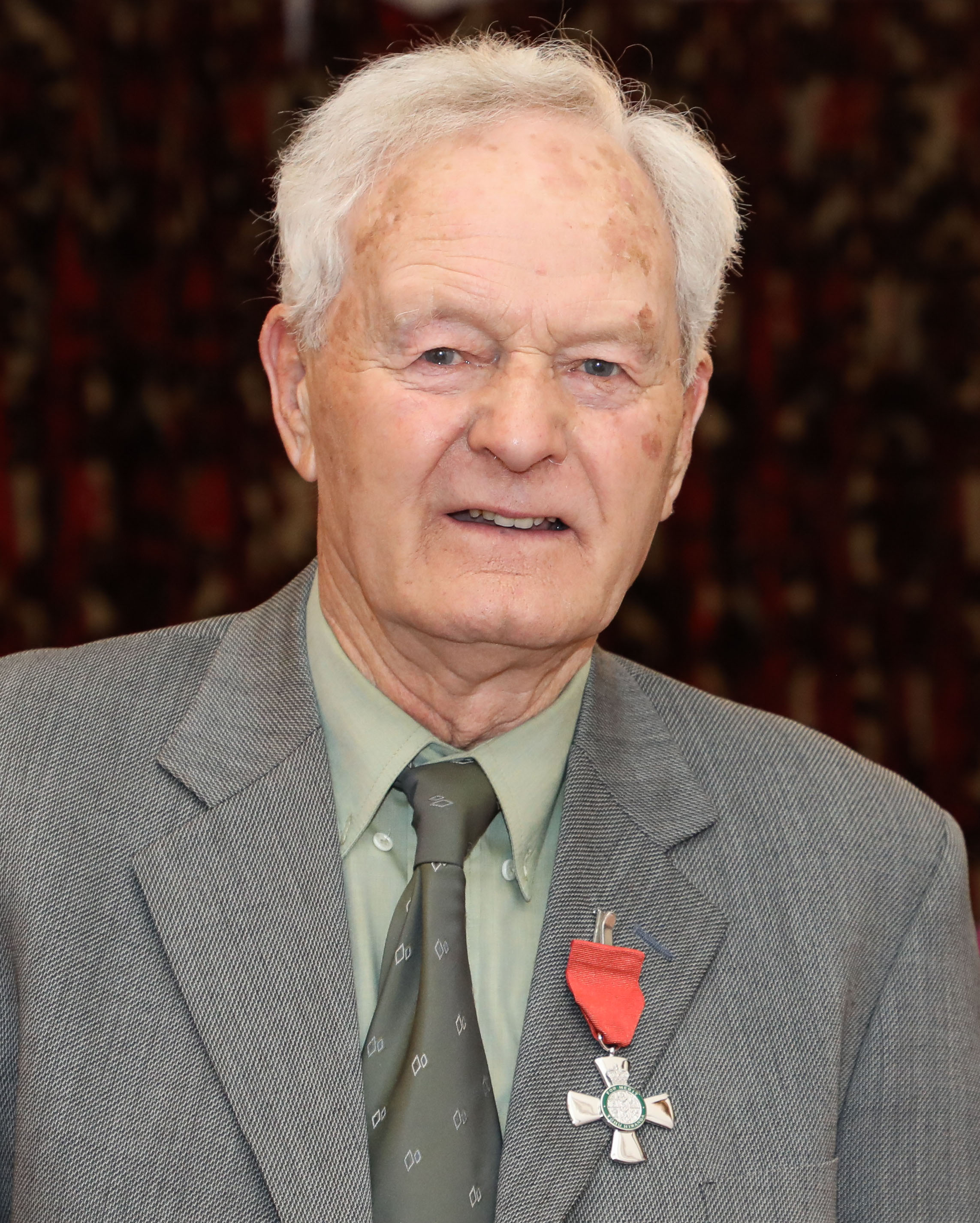
Allan Mincher

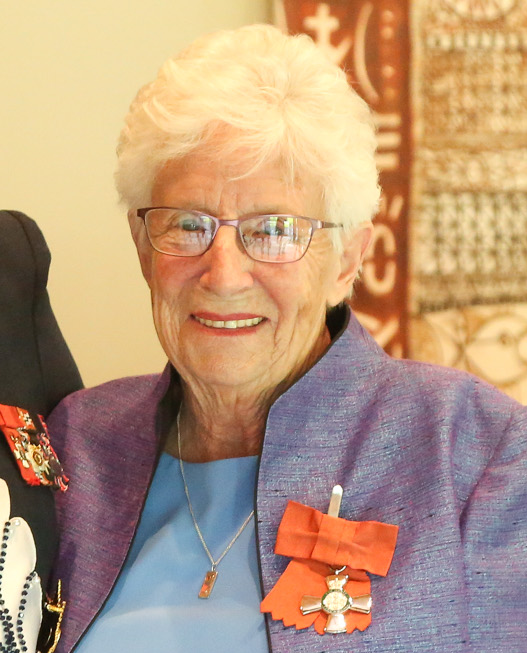
Margaret Mitchell

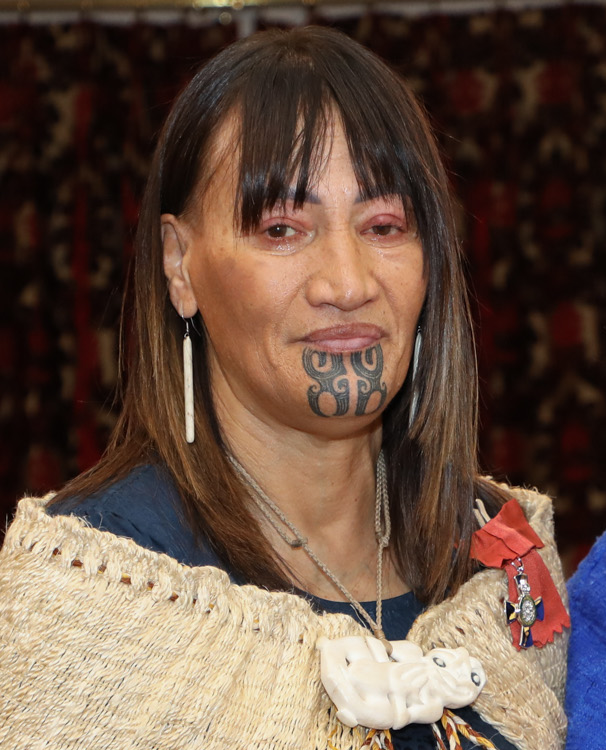
Alishia Moeahu

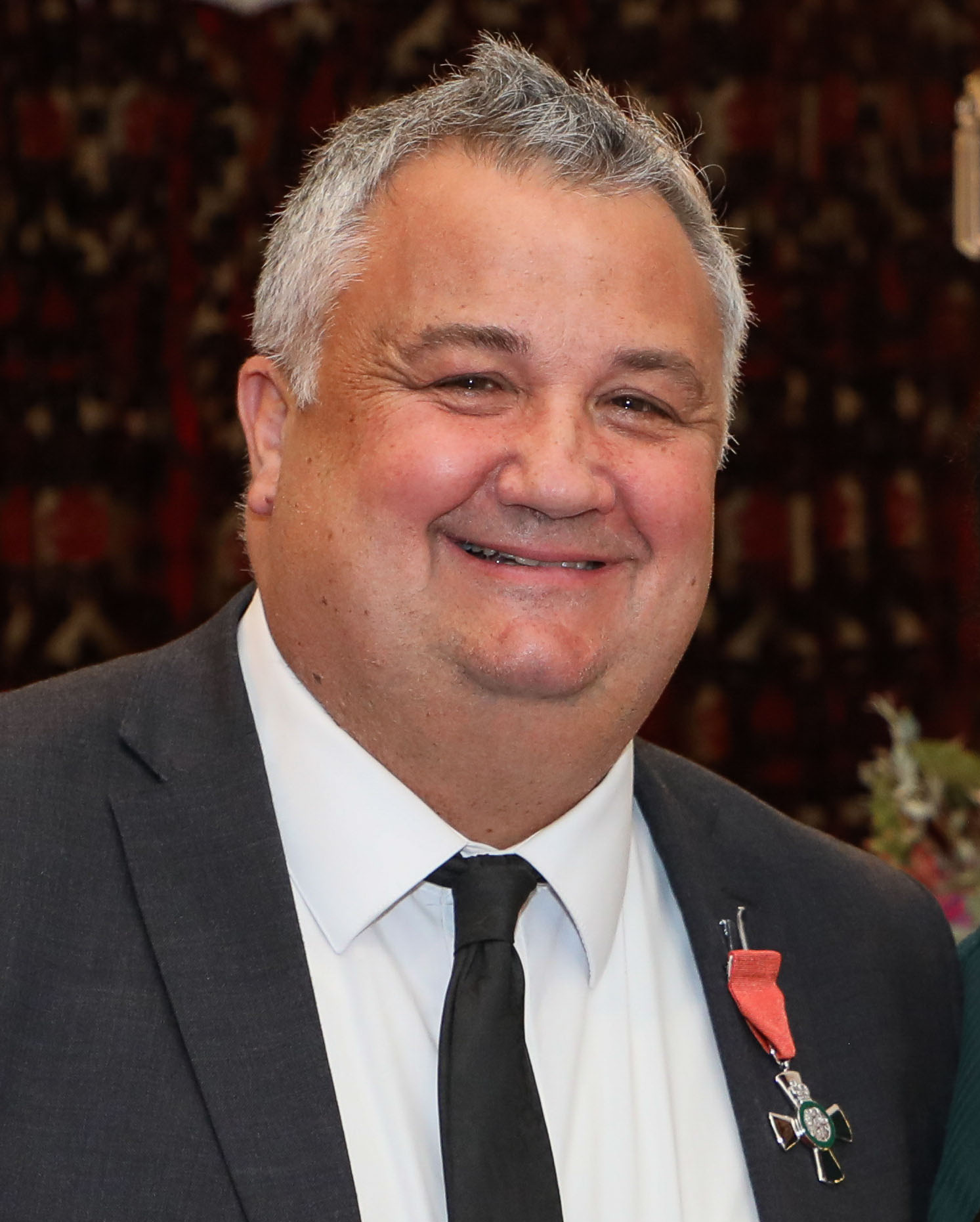
Malcolm Mulholland

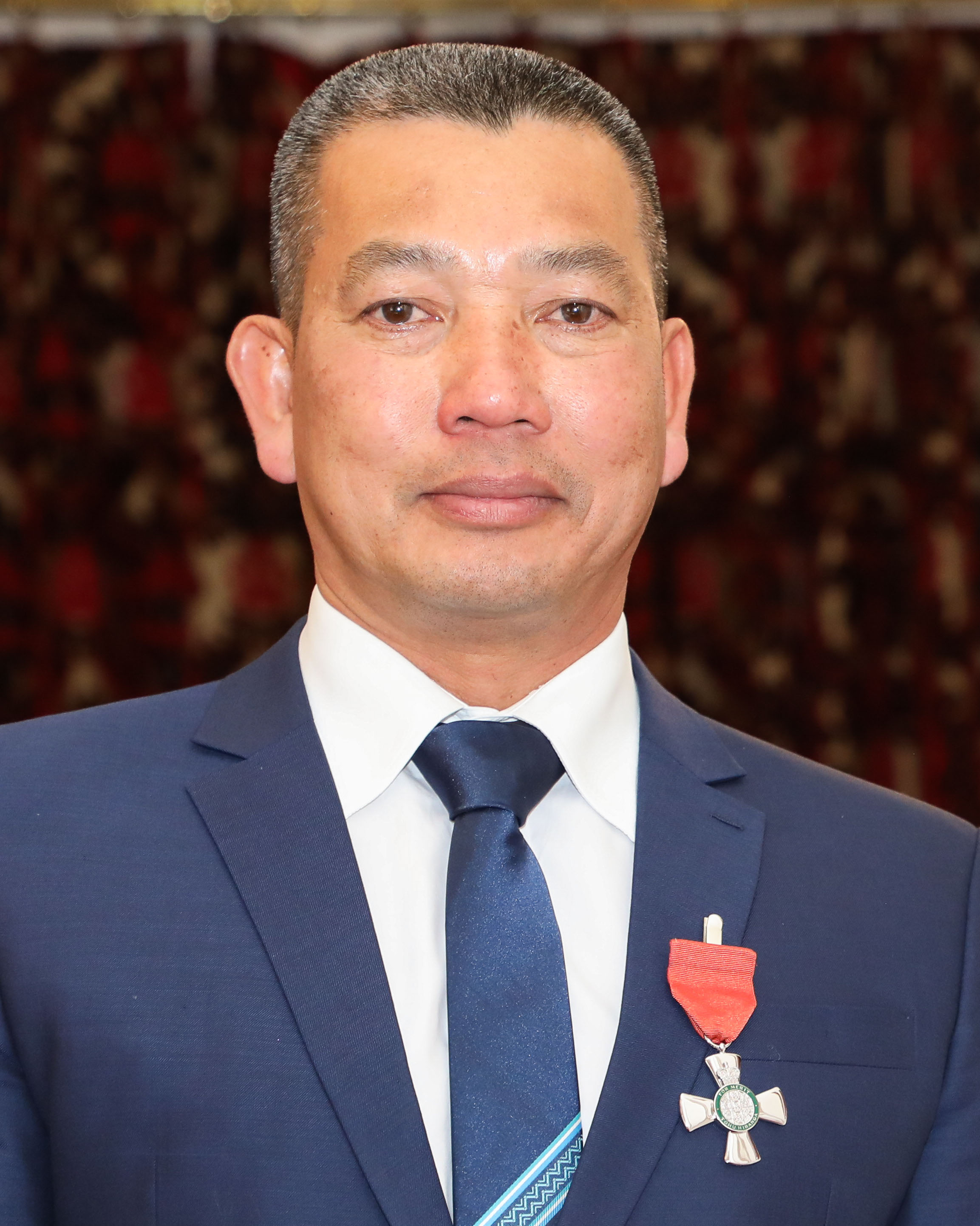
Khoa Nguyen

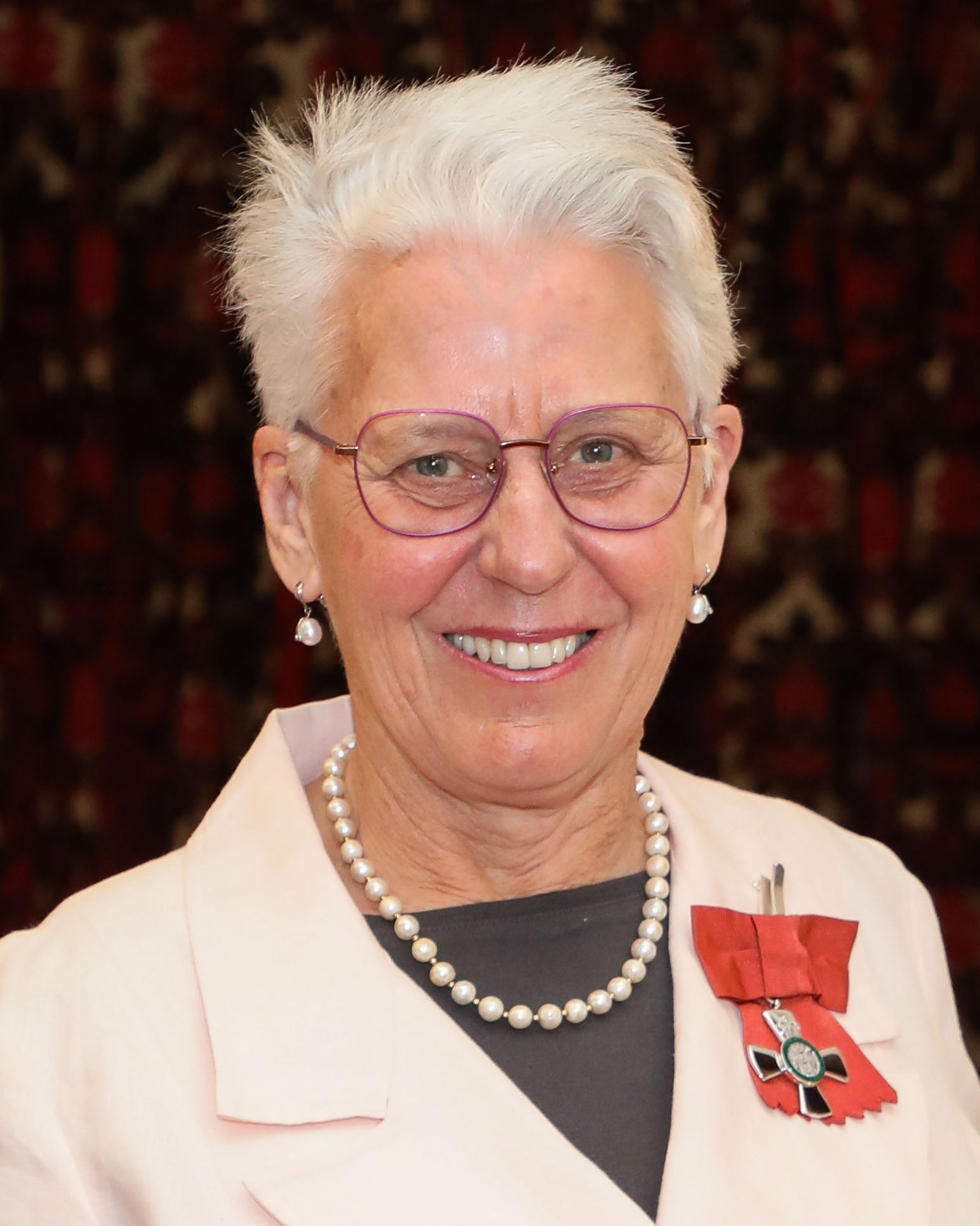
Julie Pearse

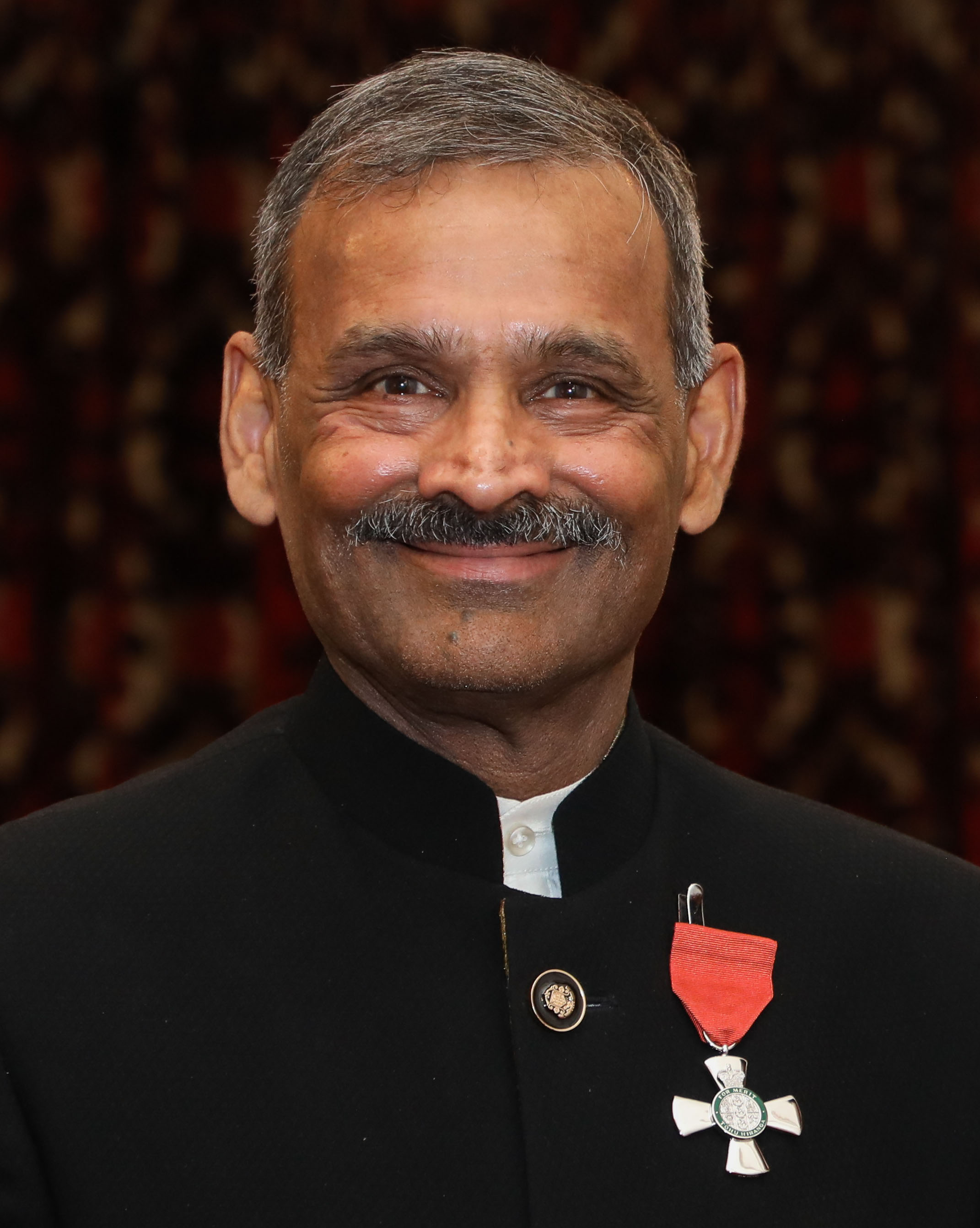
Sunit Prakash

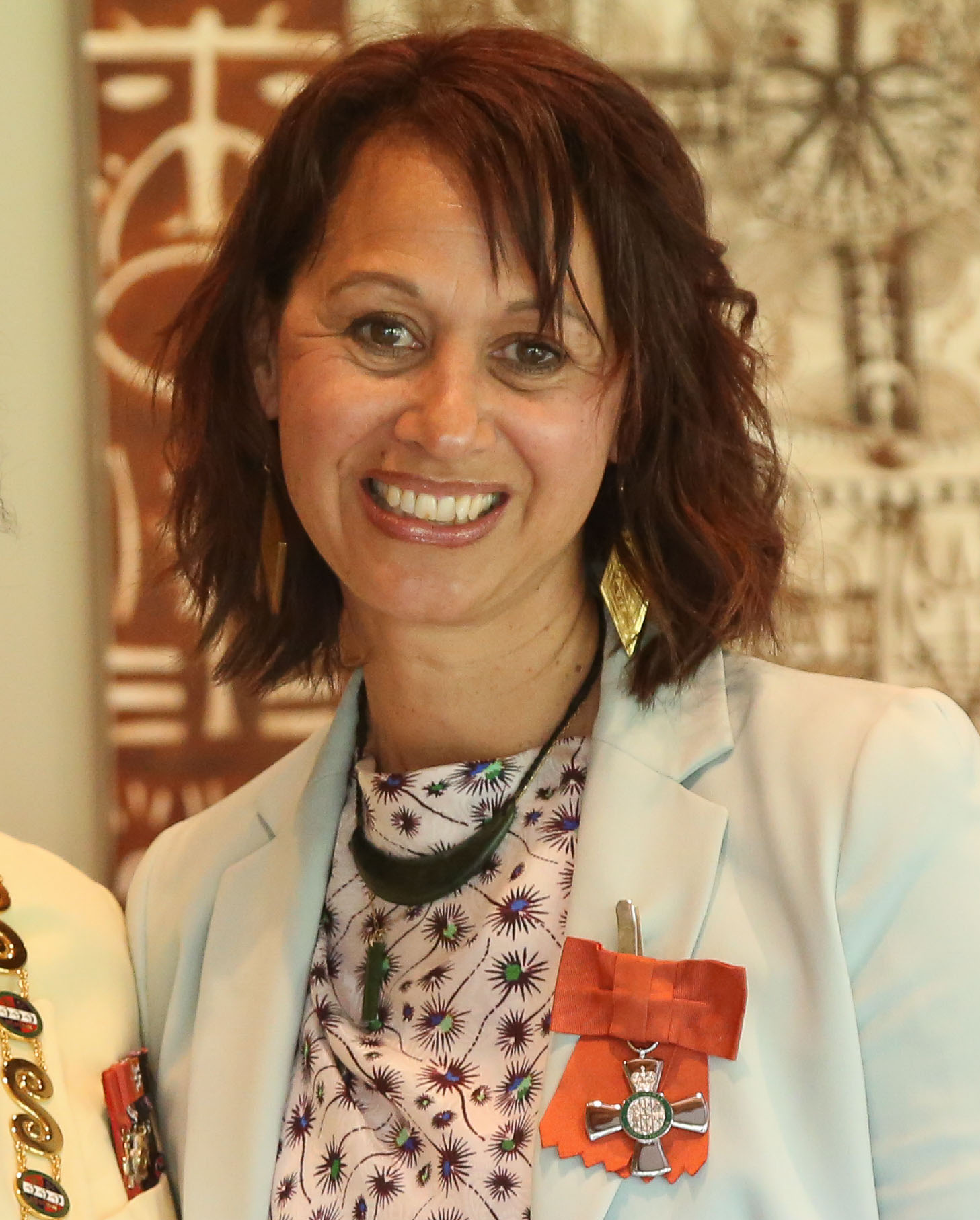
Max Ronald

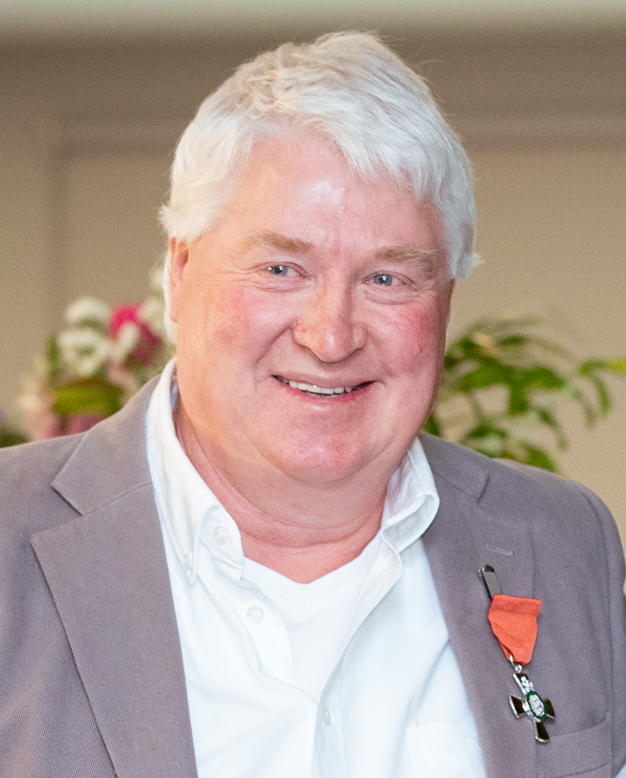
Gary Rooney

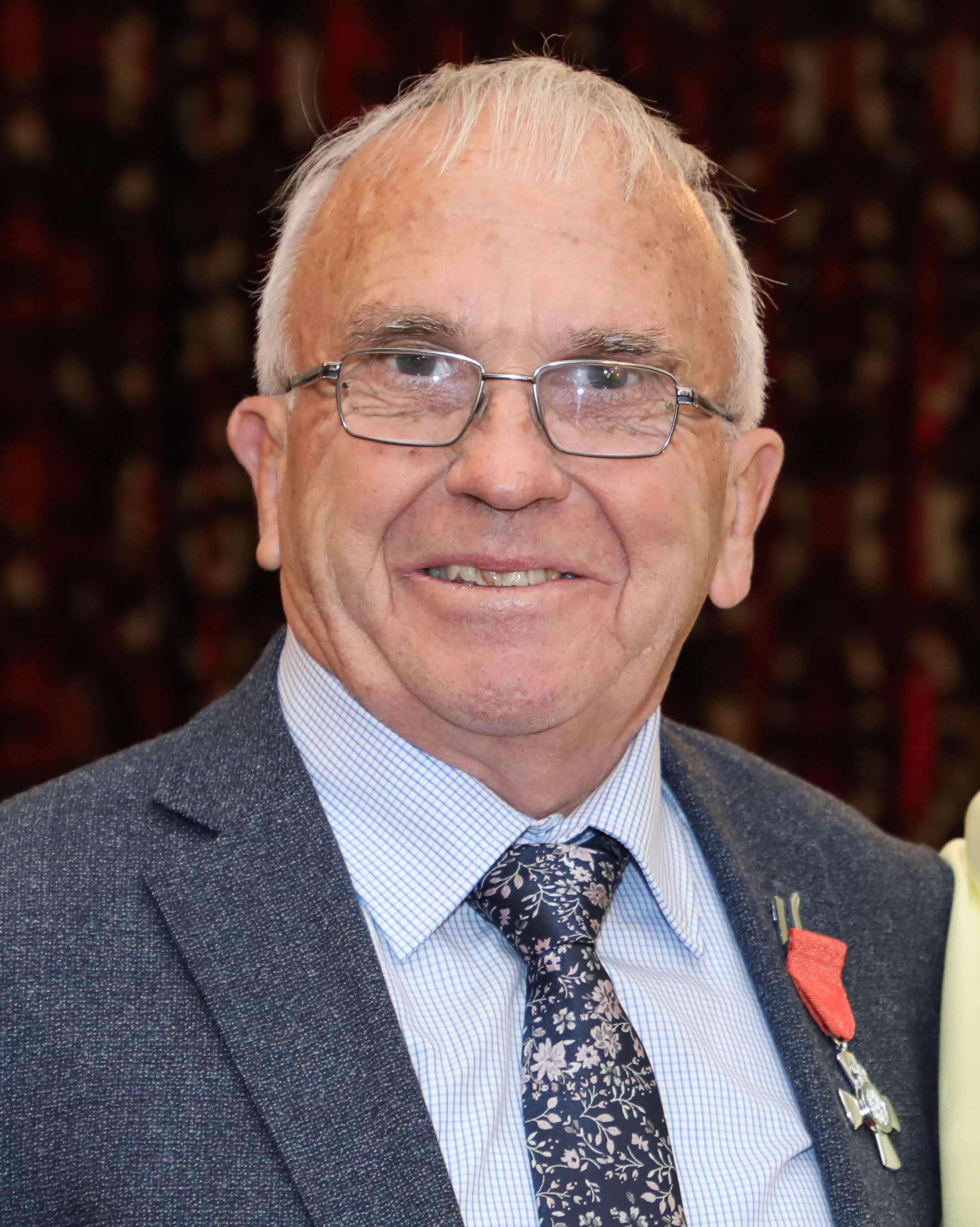
Bruce Ross

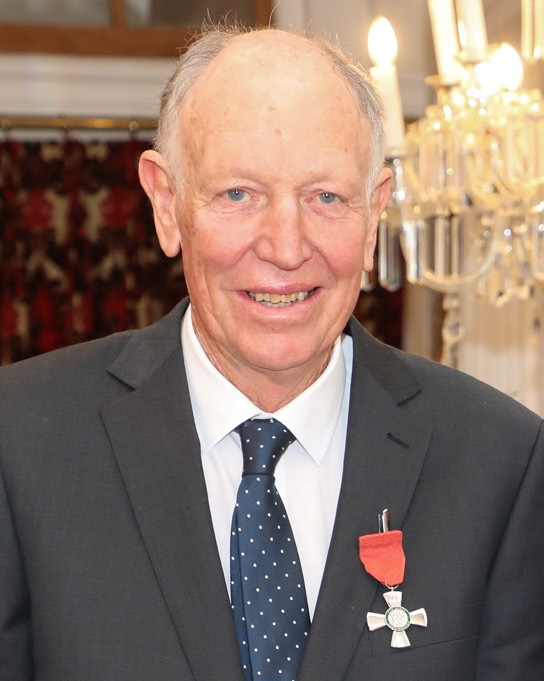
Charles Ross

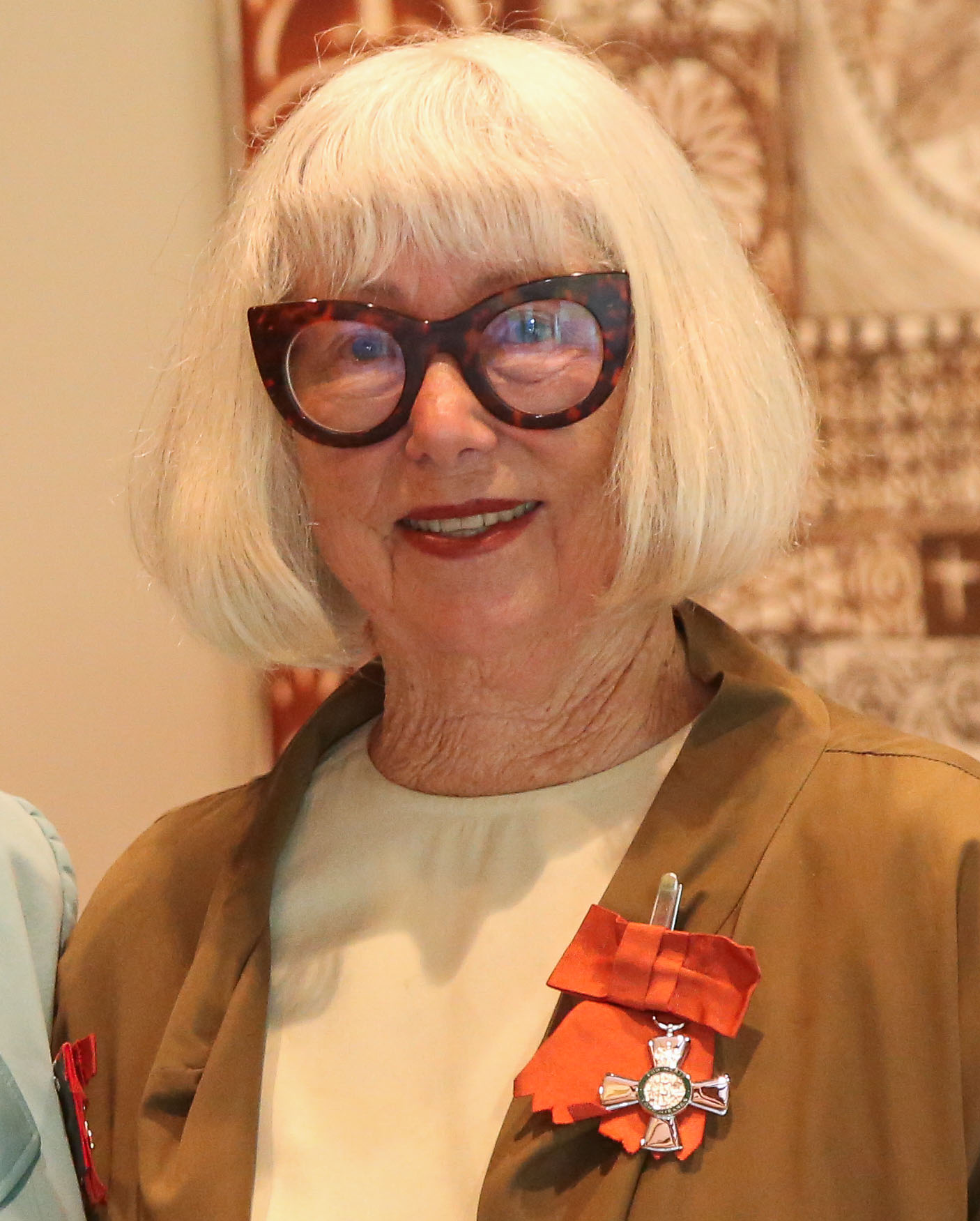
Morrin Rout

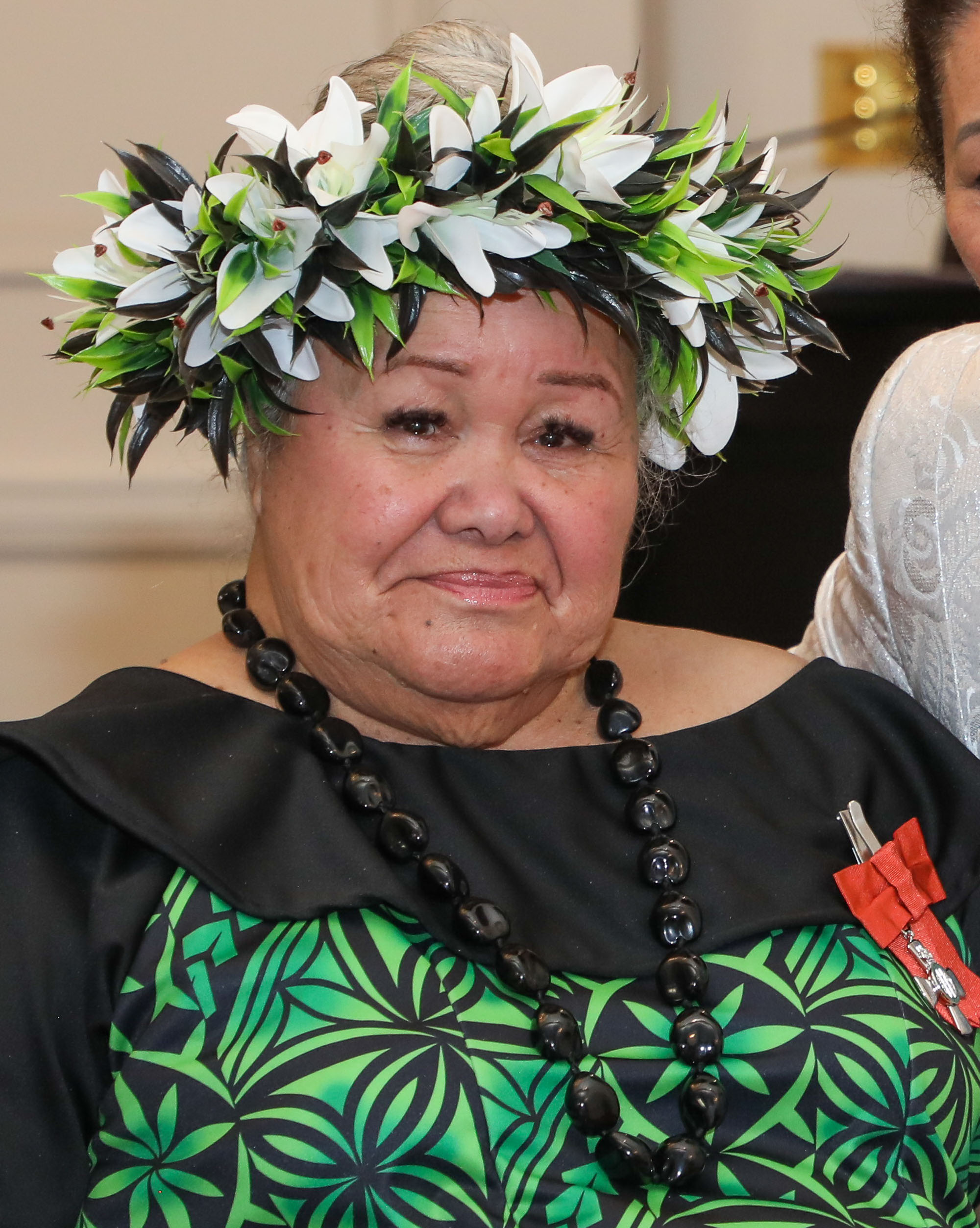
Annie Scoon

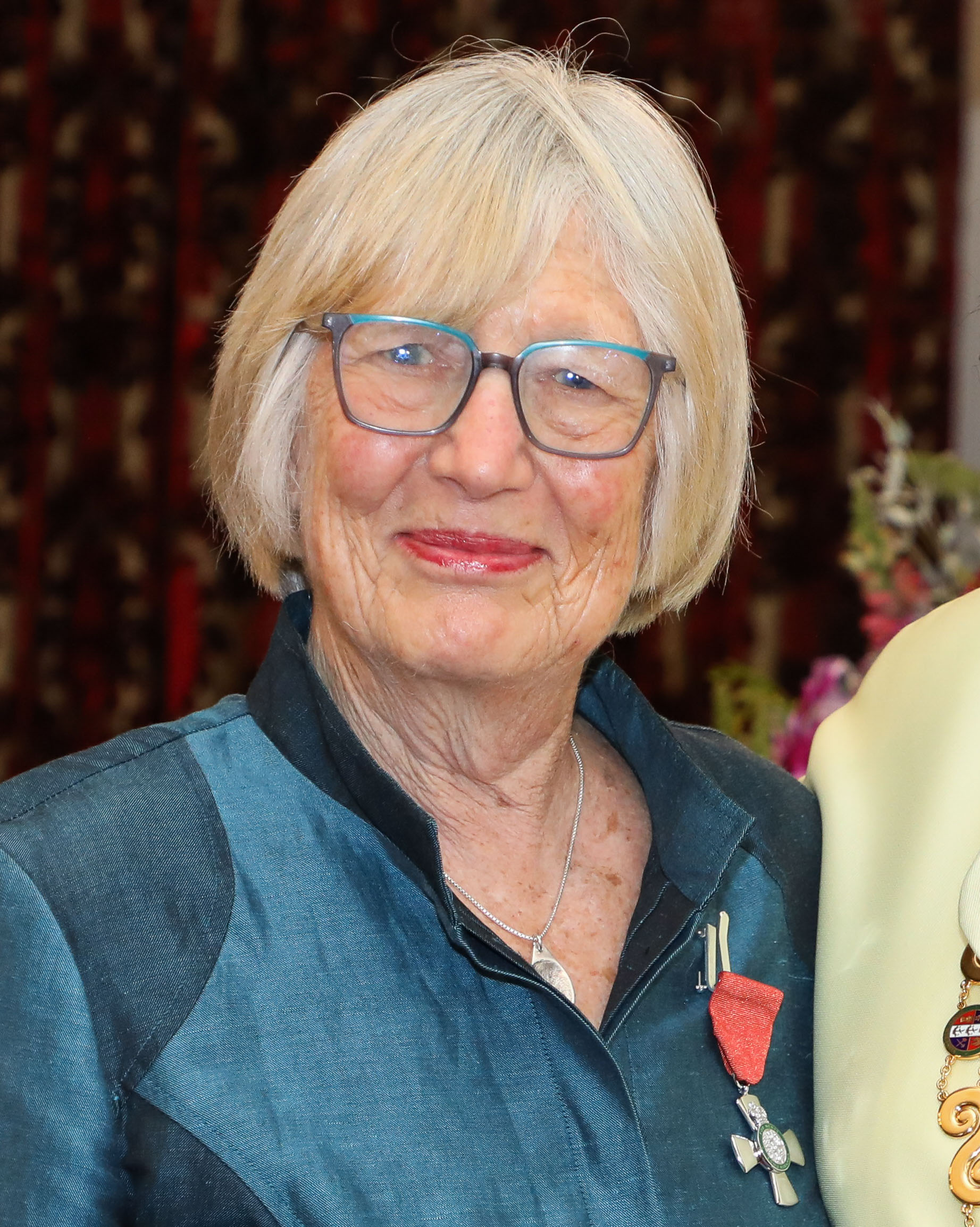
Diana Shand

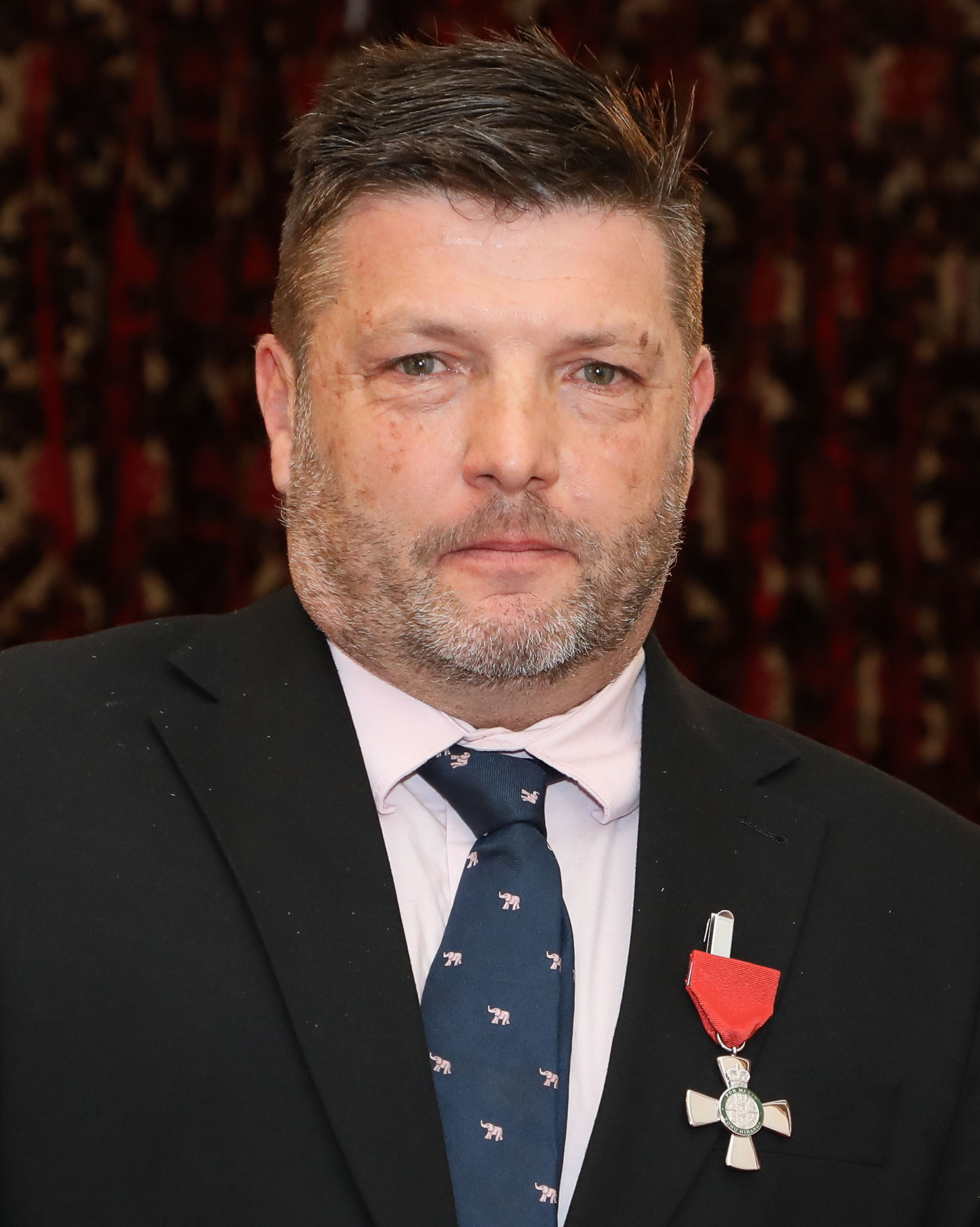
Simon Strombom

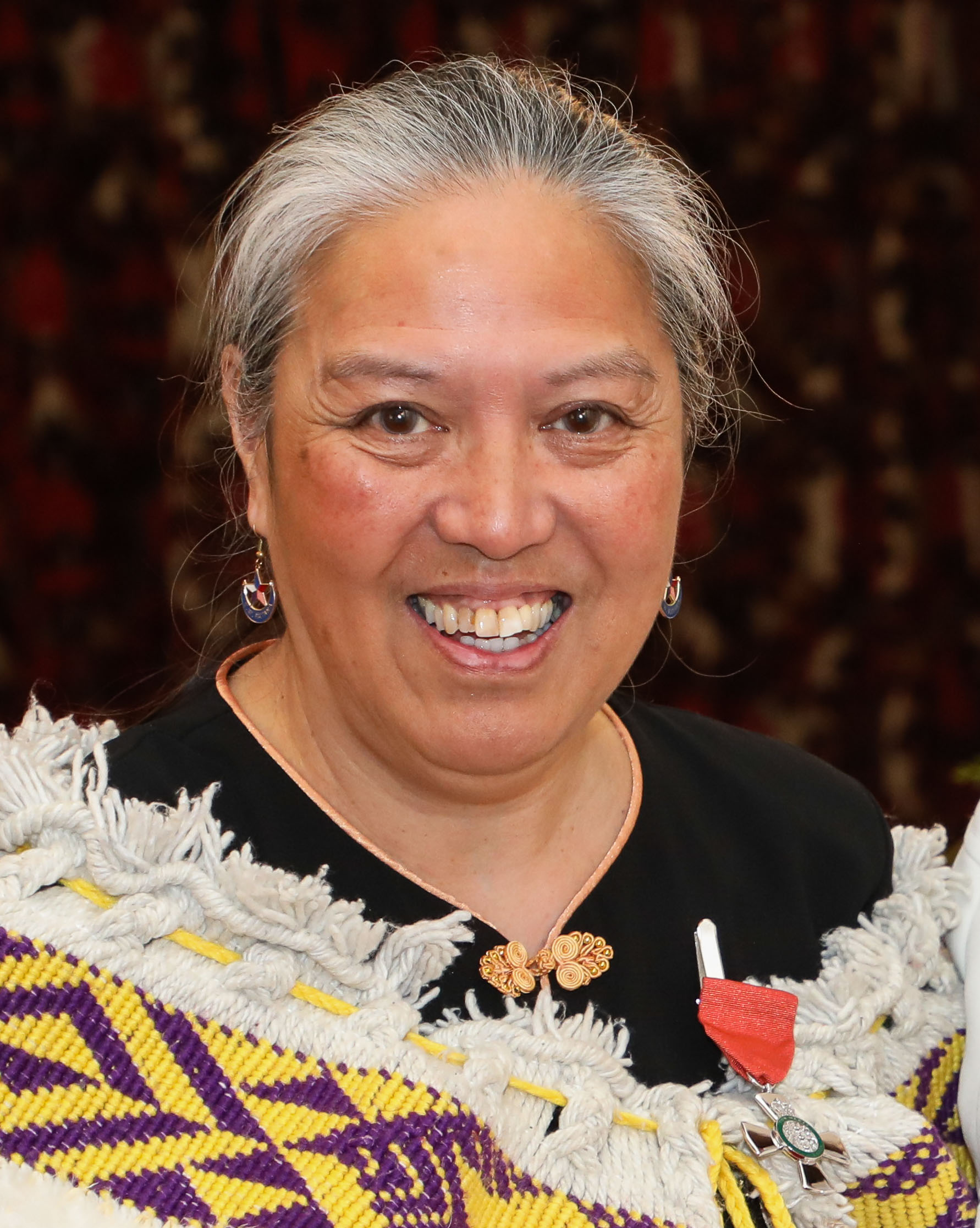
Ronnie Thompson

Diane Turner

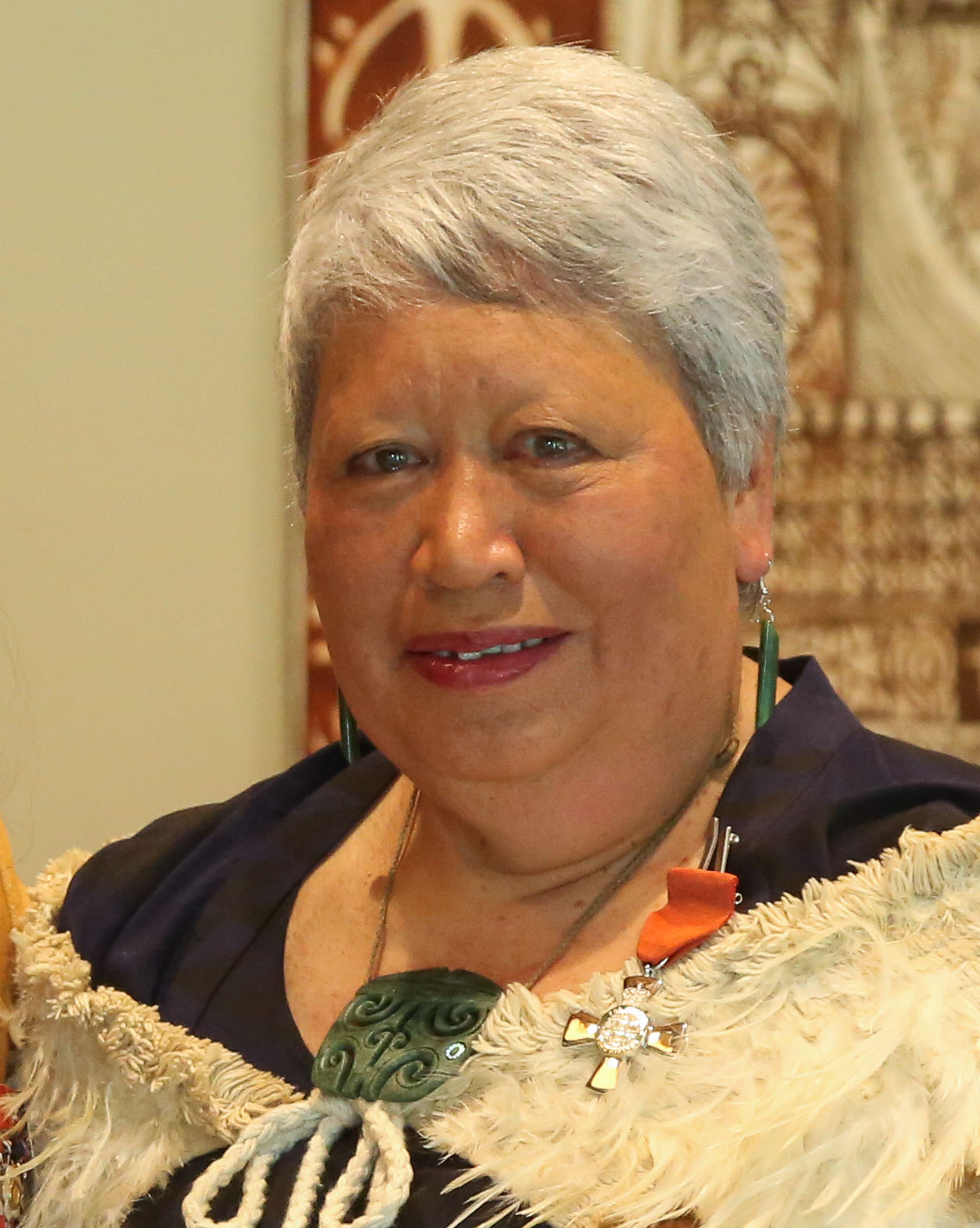
Hariata Vercoe

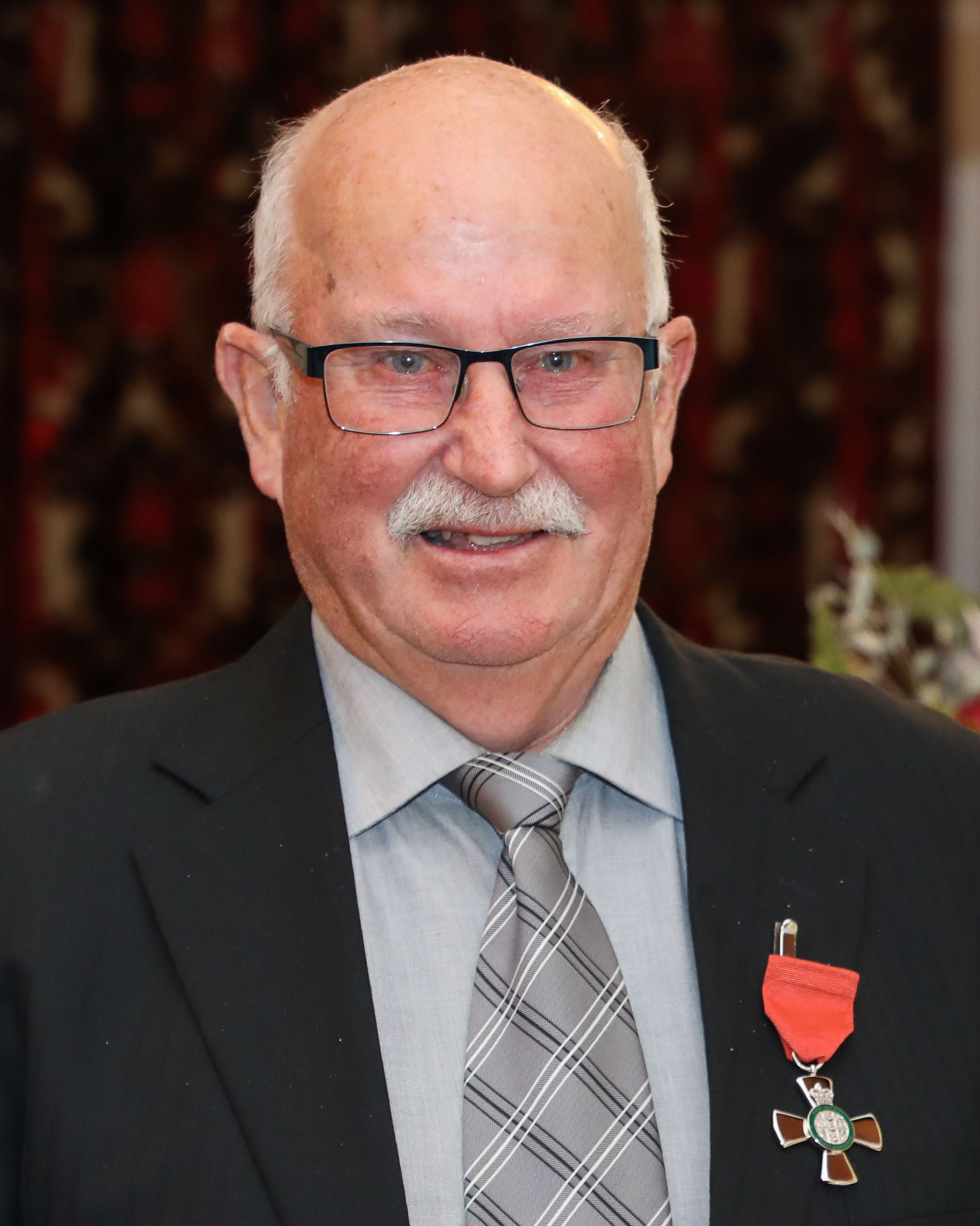
Norm Williamson

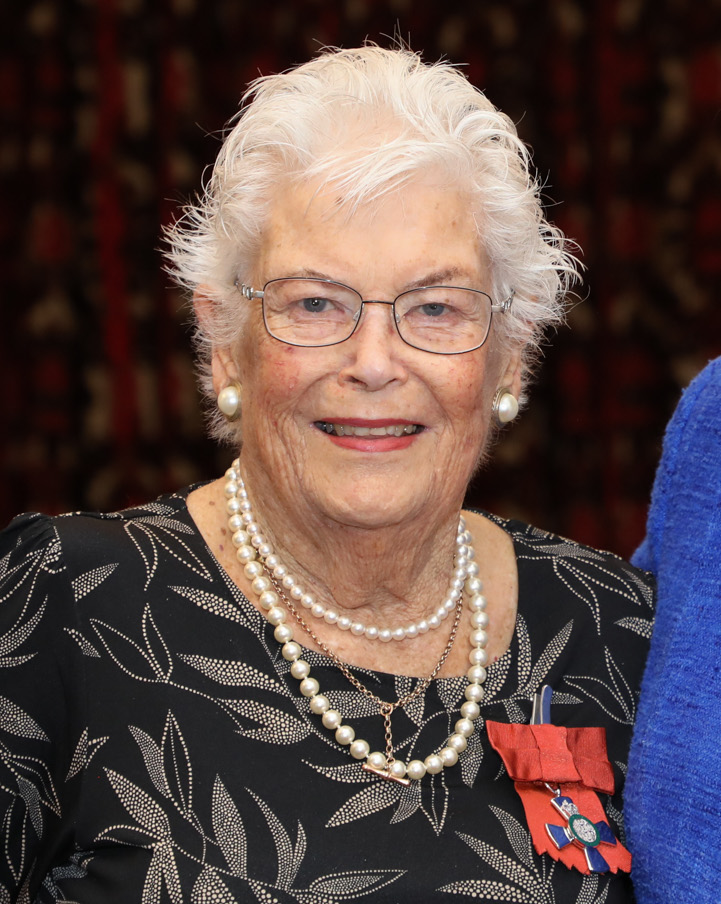
Marilyn Yeoman

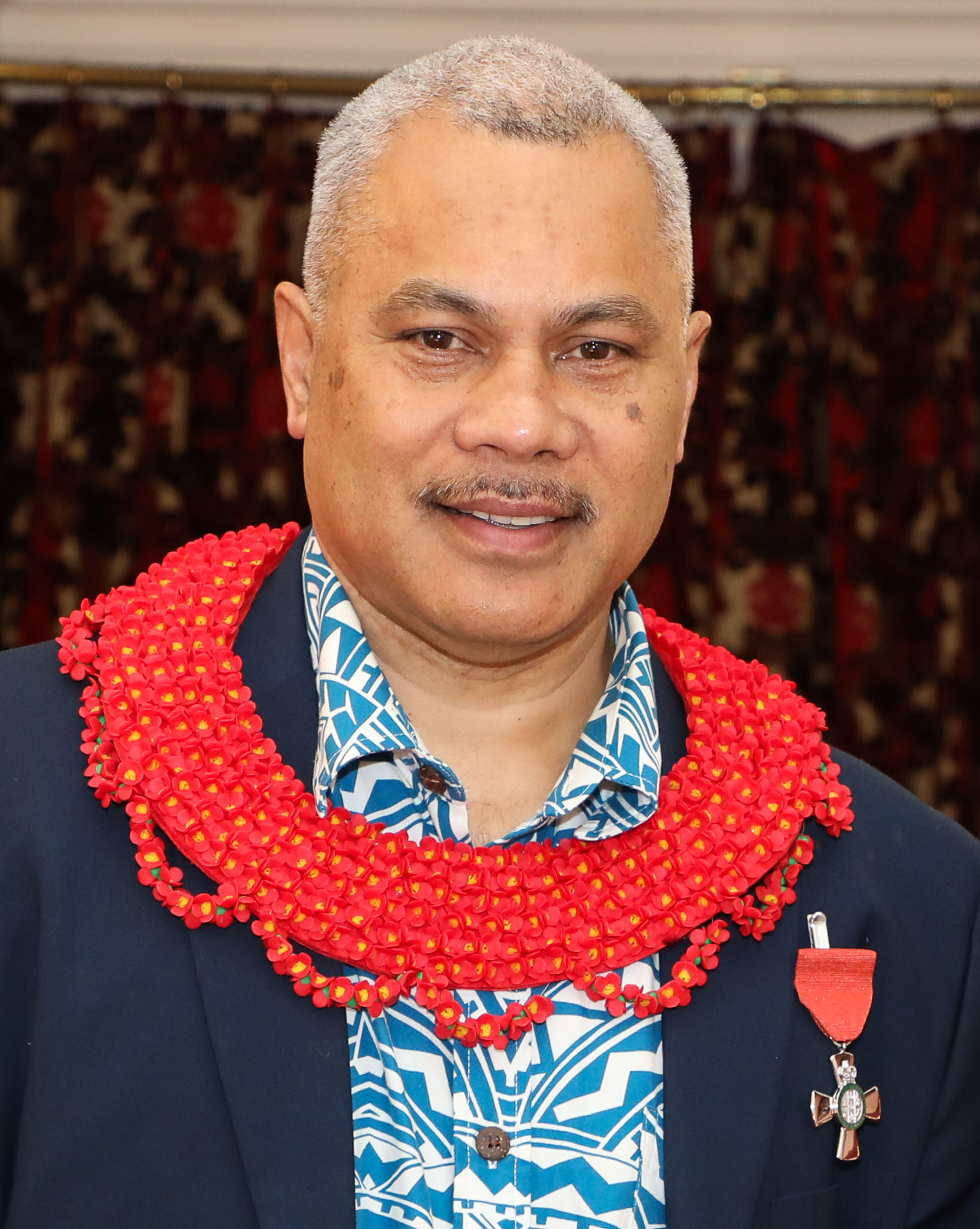
Viliami Teumohenga

== Companion of the King's Service Order (KSO) ==
- Dr Christopher Evan Longhurst – of Napier. For services to survivors of abuse in care.
- Tyrone Marks – of Hamilton. For services to survivors of abuse in care.
- Phillip Wayne Paikea – of Ruakākā. For services to the prevention of family violence and the community.
- The Honourable Dover Spencer Samuels – of Kerikeri. For services as a Member of Parliament.
- Peter William Tipene – of Kawakawa. For services to Māori.
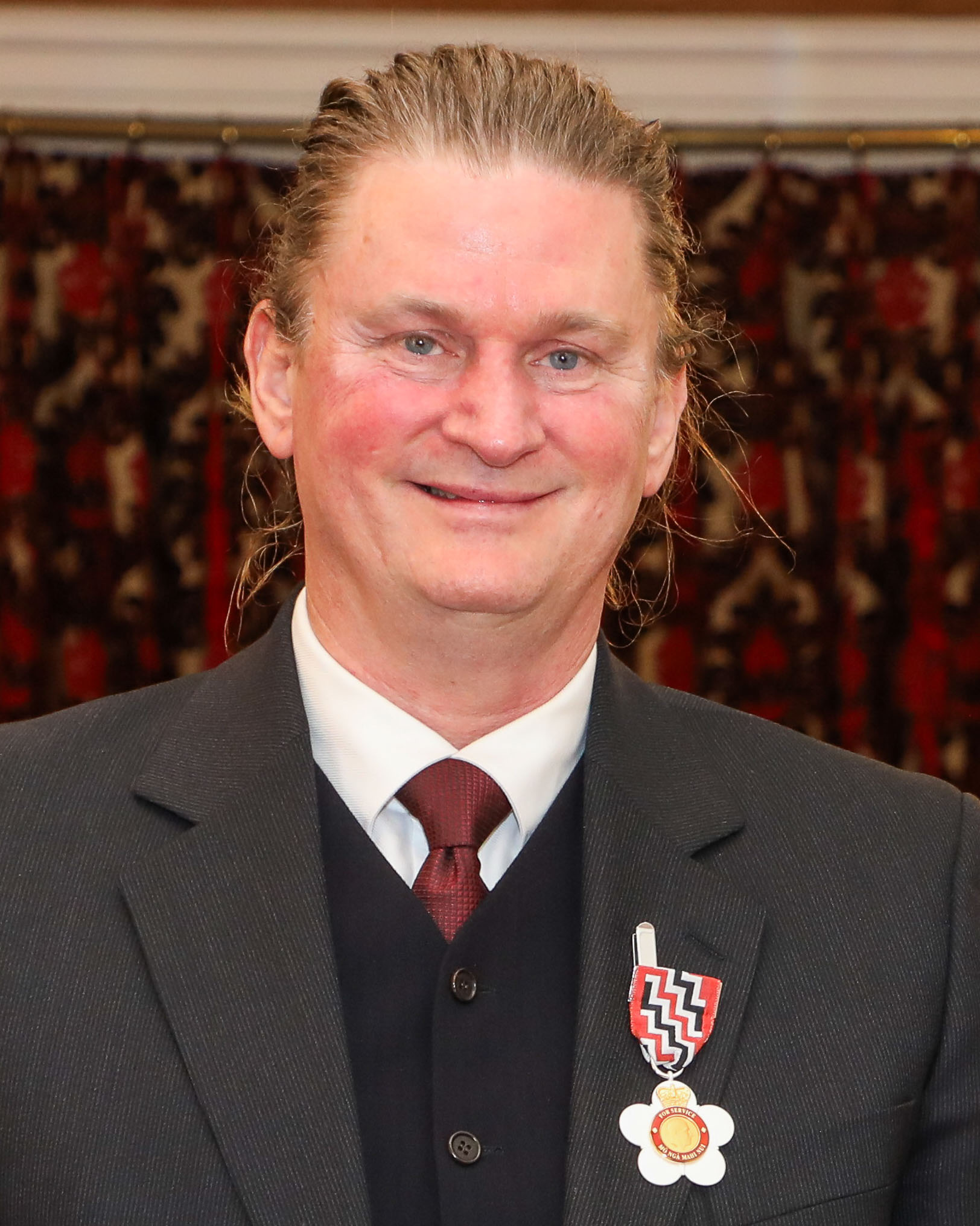
Christopher Longhurst

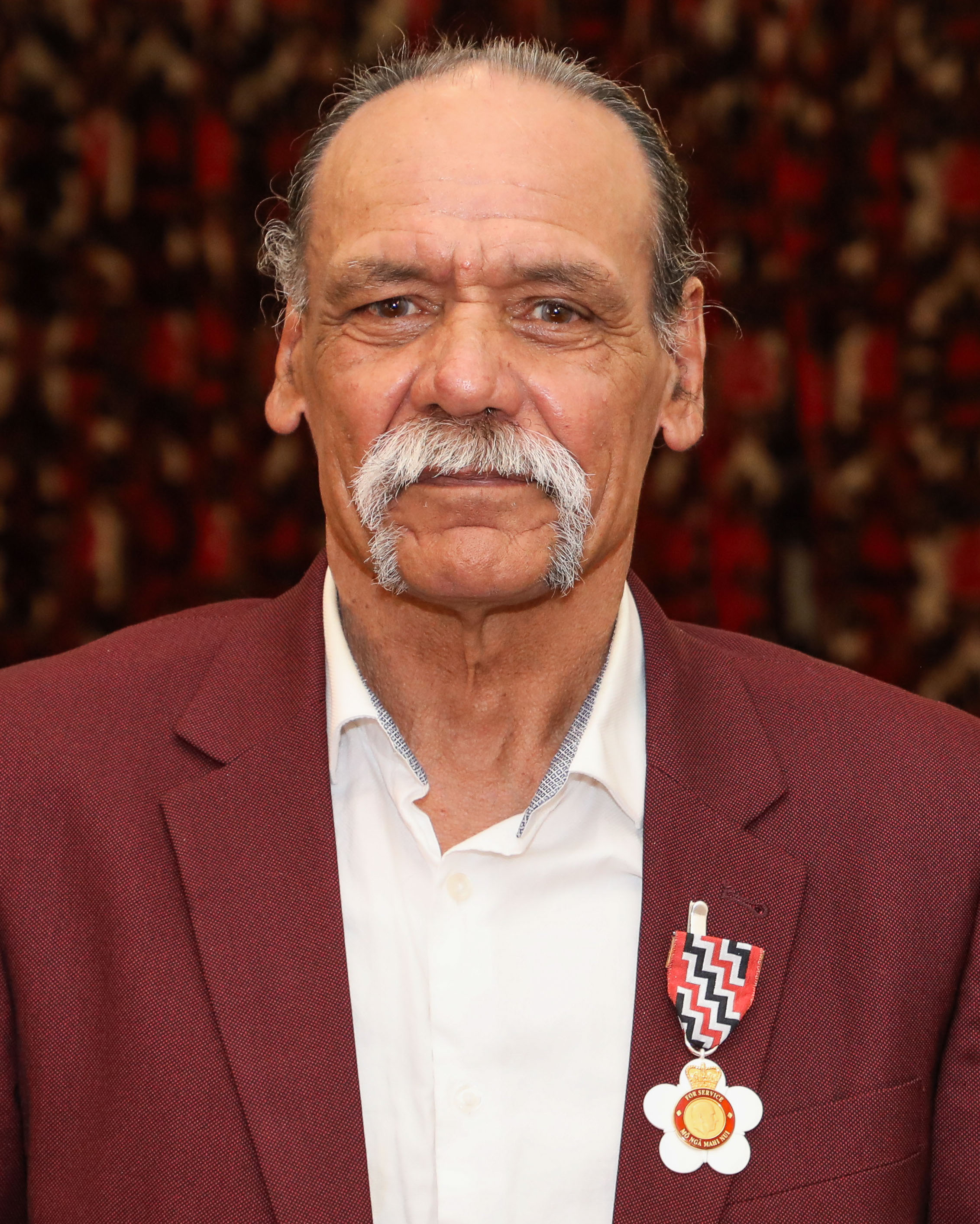
Tyrone Marks

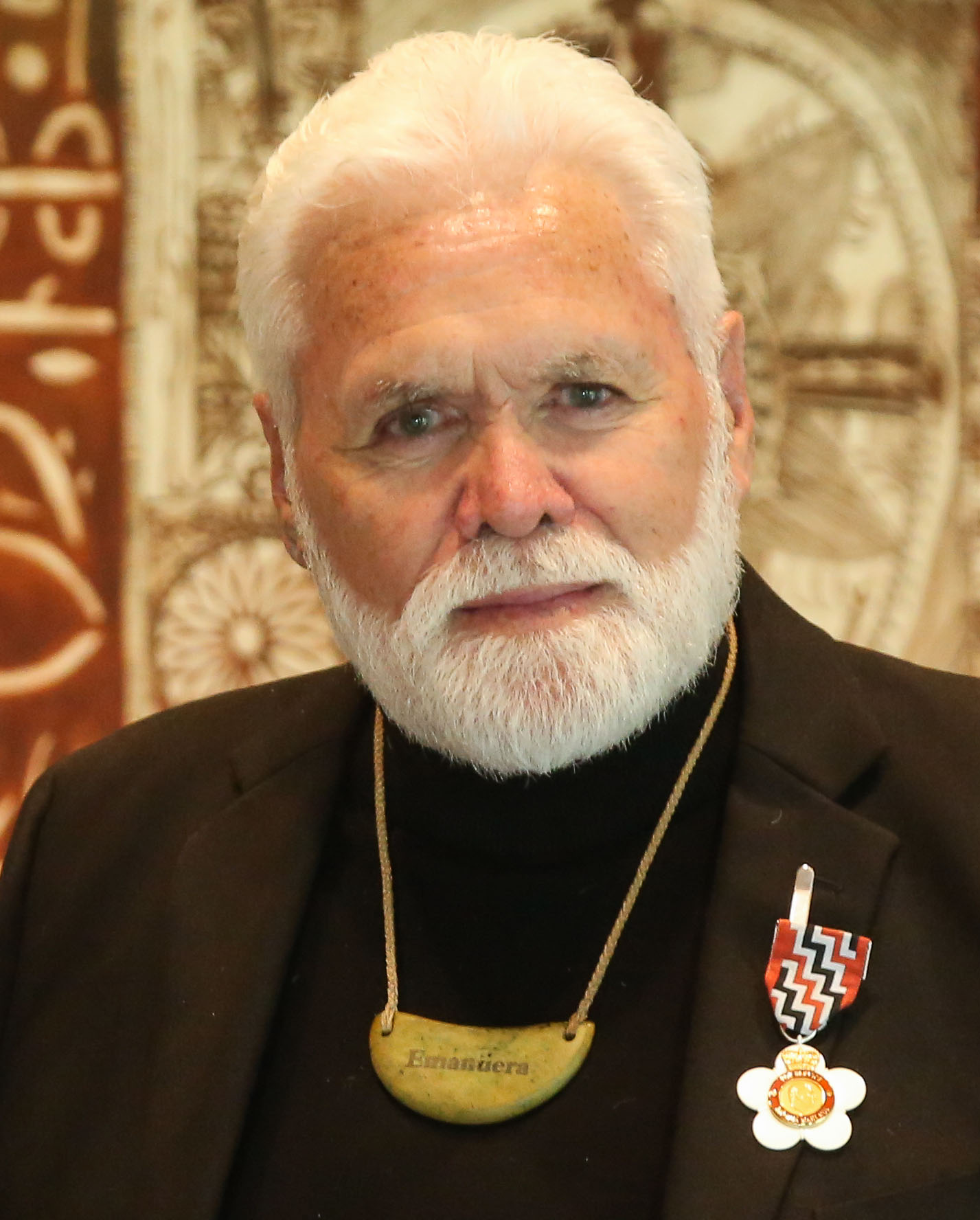
Phil Paikea

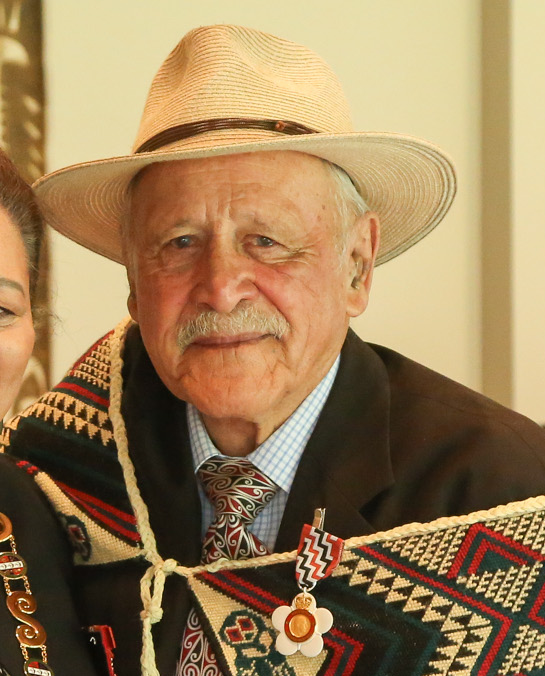
Dover Samuels

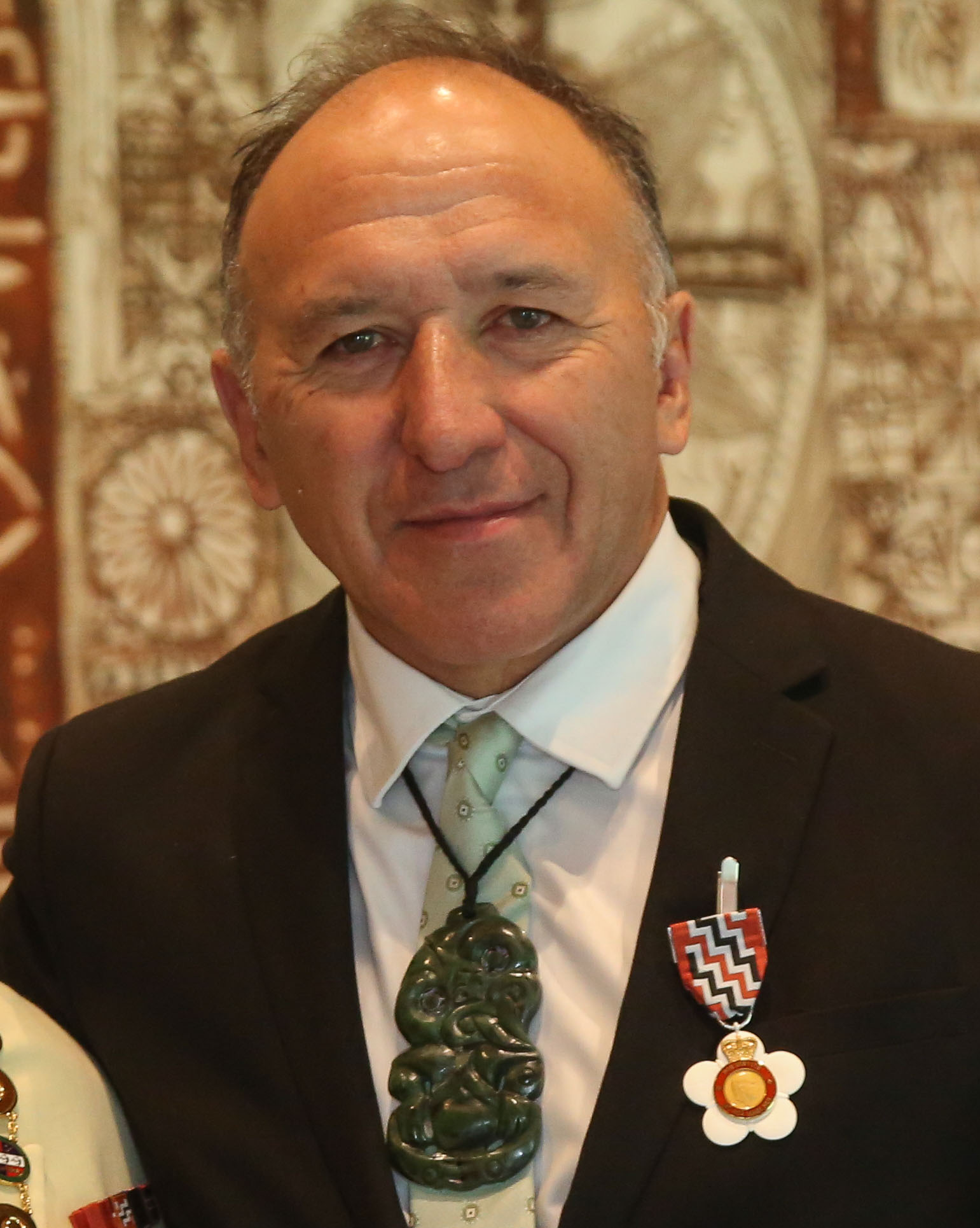
Pita Tipene

== King's Service Medal (KSM) ==
- Heather Jayne Baldwin – of Wellington. For services to the community.
- Tina May Barrett JP – of Rotorua. For services to the community.
- Debra Ann Bell – of Rotorua. For services to the community.
- Narendra Bhana – of Auckland. For services to the Indian community.
- Marius Jean Bron – of Fox Glacier. For services to Search and Rescue and the community.
- Judith Marion Browne JP – of Whanganui. For services to the community.
- Julia Mary Castles – of Auckland. For services to language education and migrant communities.
- John Albert Coleman – of Kaikohe. For services to the community and sport.
- Lily Coleman – of Kaikohe. For services to the community and sport.
- Ross Melville Cooper – of Waihi. For services to rugby.
- Margaret Jean Cousins – of Lower Hutt. For services to local government and the community.
- Glenda Gaye Davies – of Havelock. For services to the community.
- Aperira Ngahau Davis – of Moerewa. For services to the community.
- Deborah Grace Davis – of Moerewa. For services to the community.
- Gavin Lloyd Dennis JP – of Matatā. For services to Fire and Emergency New Zealand and the community.
- Edwin John Eeles JP – of Auckland. For services to pipe bands.
- Anthony William Norman Enderby – of Cambridge. For services to conservation.
- Jennifer Fay Enderby – of Cambridge. For services to conservation.
- Zora Estelle Feilo-Makapa – of Auckland. For services to the Niue community and the arts.
- Penelope-Jane Frost – of Auckland. For services to children and social work.
- Christine Ada Gilbertson – of Alexandra. For services to midwifery.
- Kaiaho (Butch) Kereama Green – of Rangiora. For services to music.
- Heidi Elizabeth Griffin – of New Plymouth. For services to the arts and the community.
- Allyson Teresa Hamblett – of Auckland. For services to people with disabilities and the transgender community.
- The Venerable Sohim Hay – of Auckland. For services to the Cambodian community.
- Katerina Hauhaua Hepi – of Kawakawa. For services to Māori language education.
- Nicola Linda Hickey (Nicky Rawlings) – of Napier. For services to Victim Support.
- Luen Nanette Hoani – of Auckland. For services to Māori language education.
- Parminder Kaur JP – of Auckland. For services to multicultural communities.
- Kevin Francis Loe JP – of Blenheim. For services to the community and agriculture.
- Timothy Peter Marshall – of Gisborne. For services to the community and waka ama.
- Audrey Myra Mattinson – of Rangiora. For services to Scottish country dancing and the community.
- Annie Elizabeth McCracken – of Invercargill. For services to the community.
- The Reverend Rosemary McMillan – of Woodville. For services to the community.
- Clem Burnard Mellish – of Havelock. For services to Māori art and music.
- Graham Frederick Charles Milligan – of Tauranga. For services to the Royal New Zealand Returned and Services Association.
- Fergus Charles Denis More – of Invercargill. For services to the community and the law.
- Graham (Kereama) Douglas Nathan – of Silverdale. For services to Māori.
- Terence John O'Regan – of Moana. For services to nursing and the community.
- Alison Isabel Perrin JP – of Rotorua. For services to the community and music.
- Narayanan Kutty Pulloothpadath – of New Plymouth. For services to ethnic communities.
- Berry Jane Rangi – of Napier. For services to the community, particularly Pacific peoples.
- Karen Elizabeth Richards – of Richmond. For services to textiles history and conservation.
- Papali'i Seiuli Johnny Siaosi – of Auckland. For services to health and the Pacific community.
- Rosemary Jan Sloman JP – of Whakatāne. For services to the community.
- Roberta Jane Smallfield JP – of Dunedin. For services to historical research and the community.
- Alan (Curly) Rex Troon – of Taihape. For services to Fire and Emergency New Zealand.
- Jacqueline June Watson – of Kaiapoi. For services to the community and the arts.
- Dr Glenys Margaret Weir – of Gore. For services to health.
- Merrilyn Joy Withers – of Lower Hutt. For services to youth and the Baptist movement.
- Yuanyong Yang – of Auckland. For services to bonsai and the Chinese community.

Honorary

- Eteuati Fa'avae – of Nelson. For services to the Pacific community.
- Siesina Ofahelotu Latu – of Timaru. For services to the Pacific community.
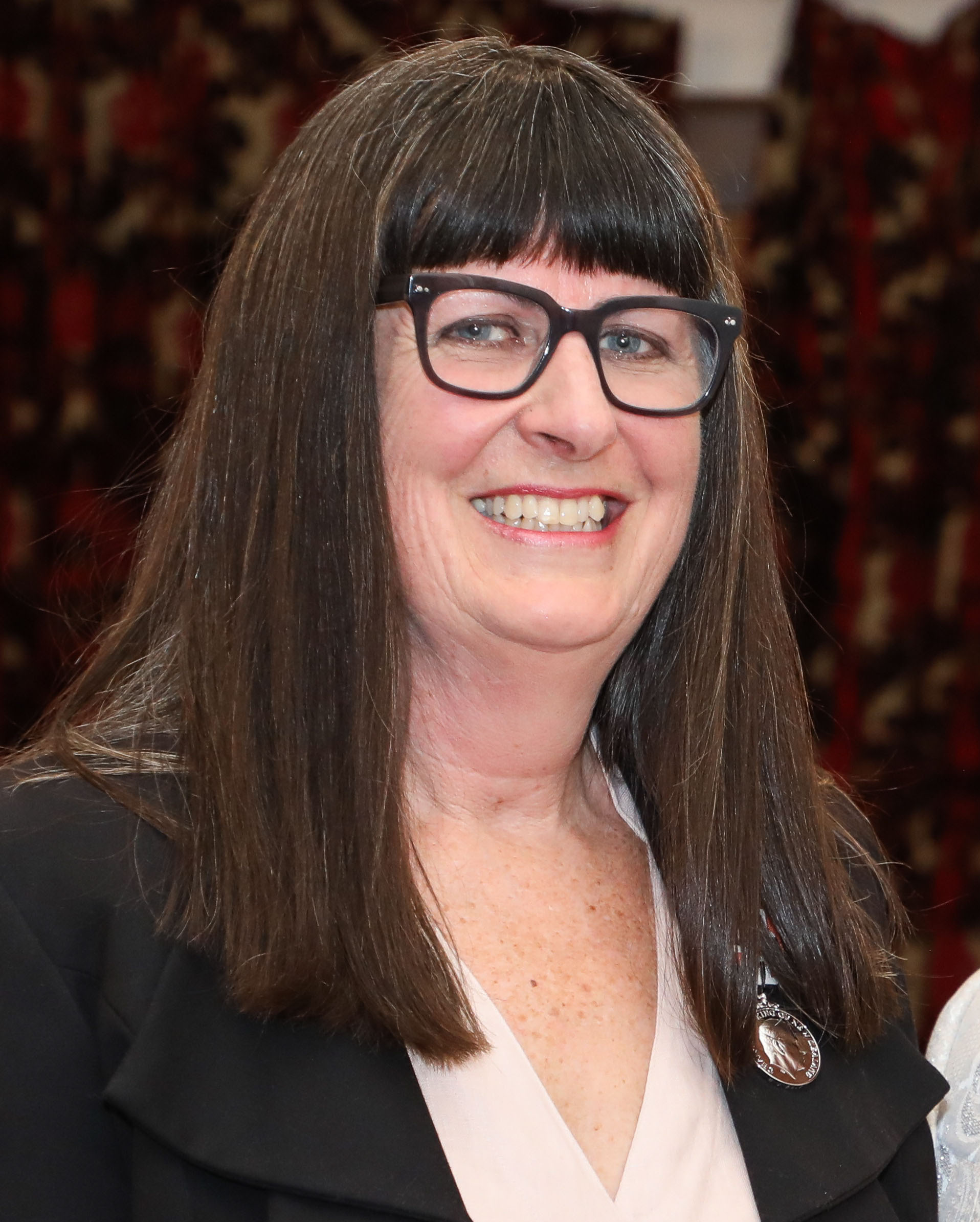
Heather Baldwin

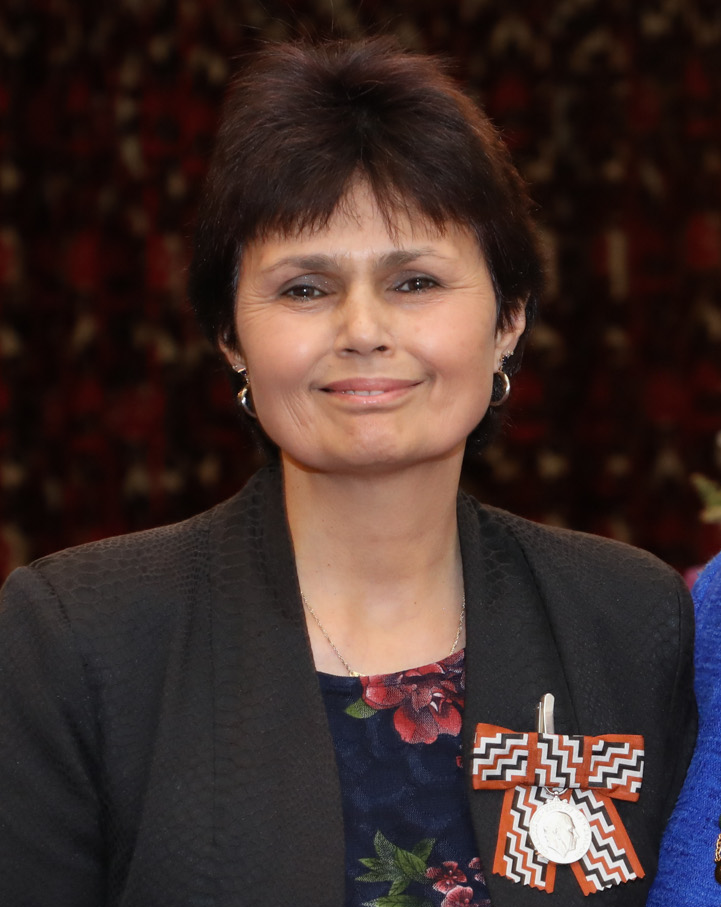
Tina Barrett

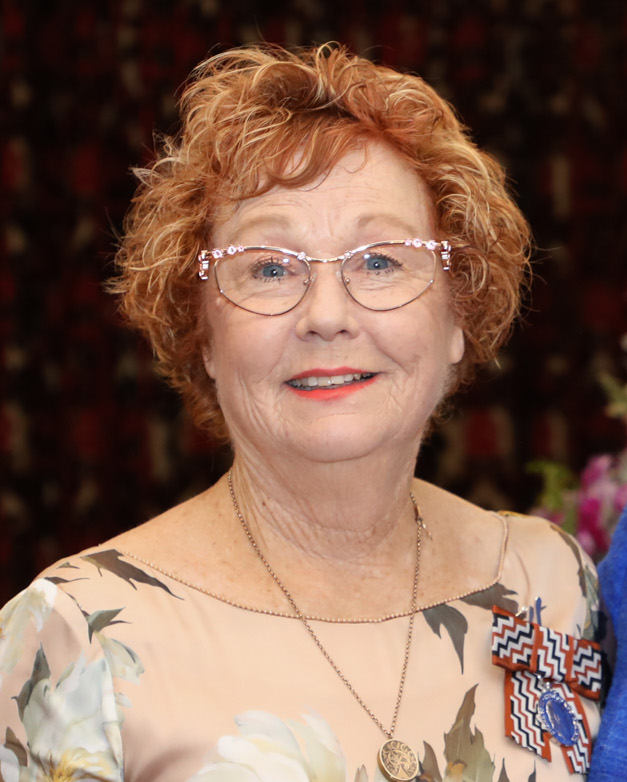
Deb Bell

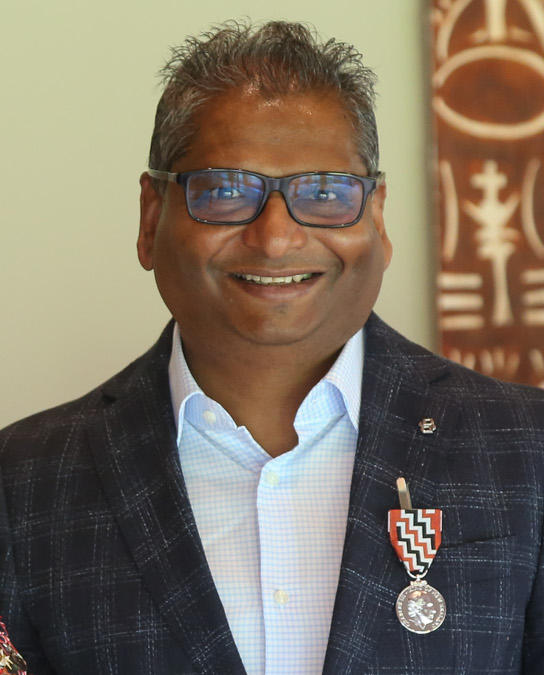
Narendra Bhana

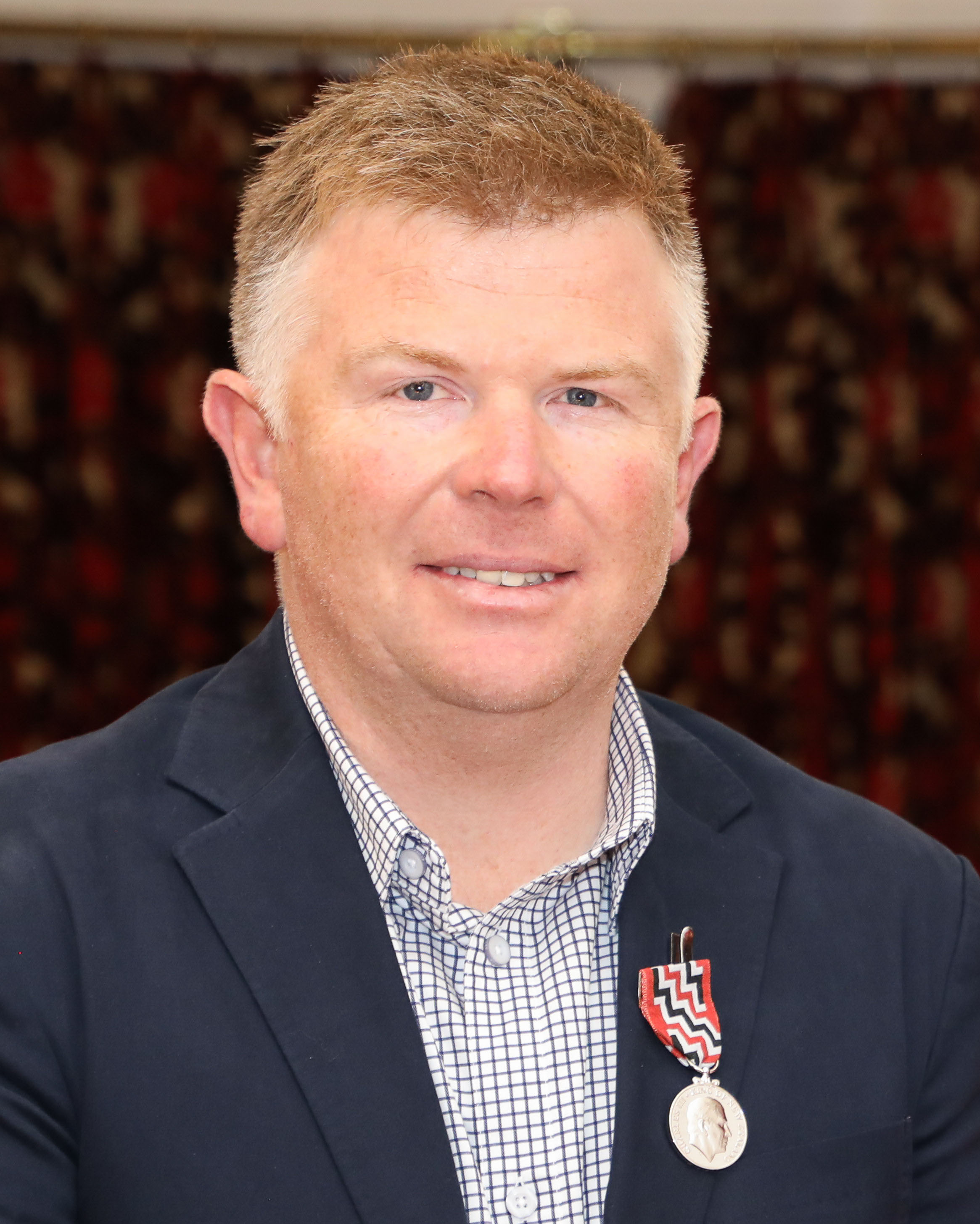
Marius Bron

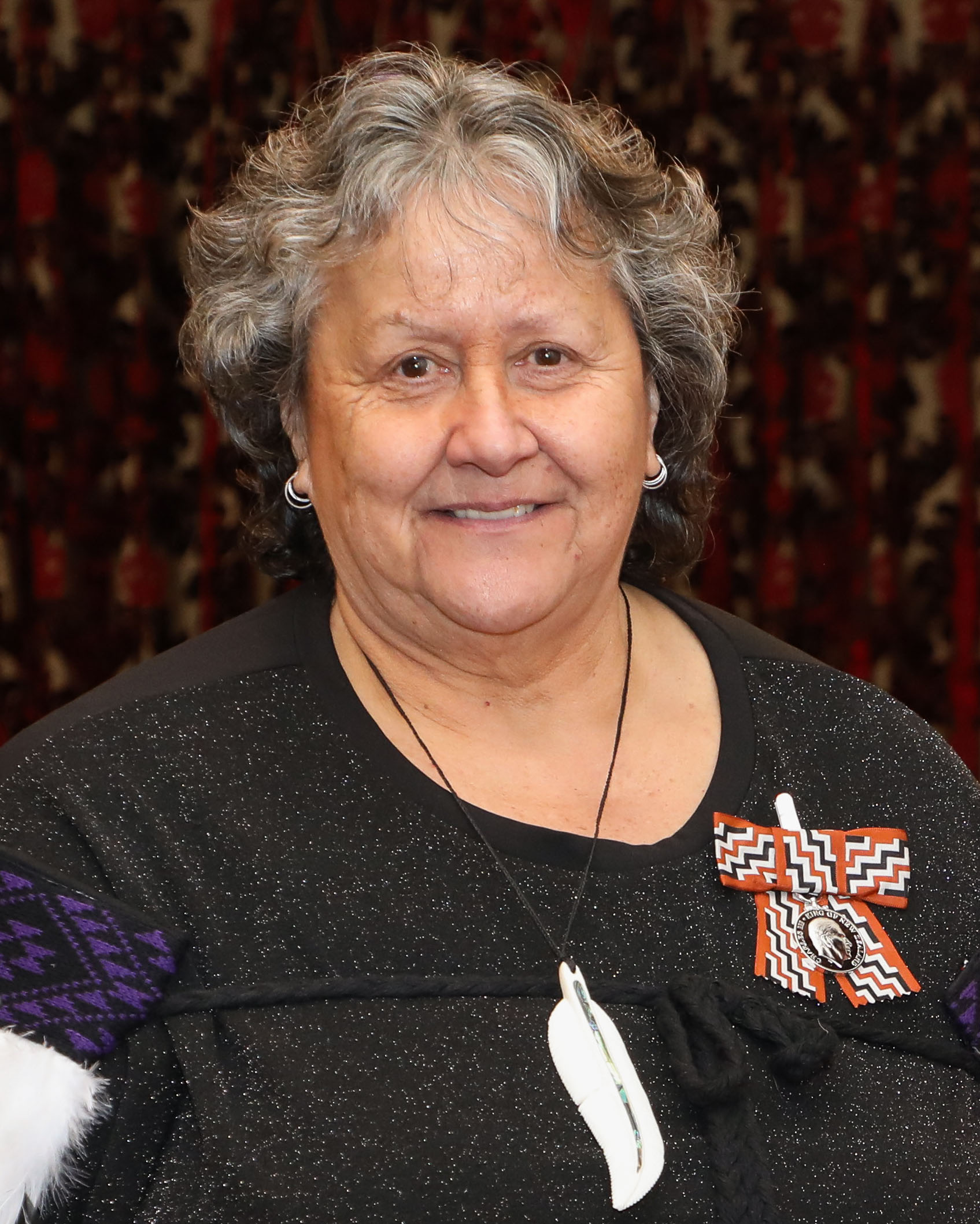
Judith Browne

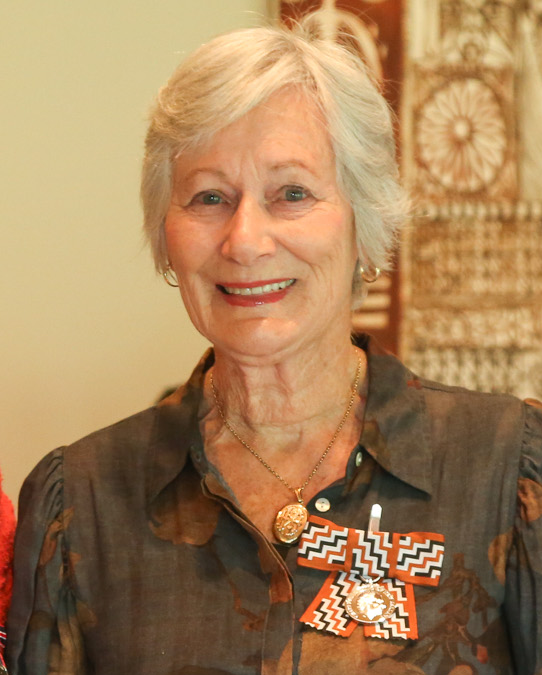
Julia Castles

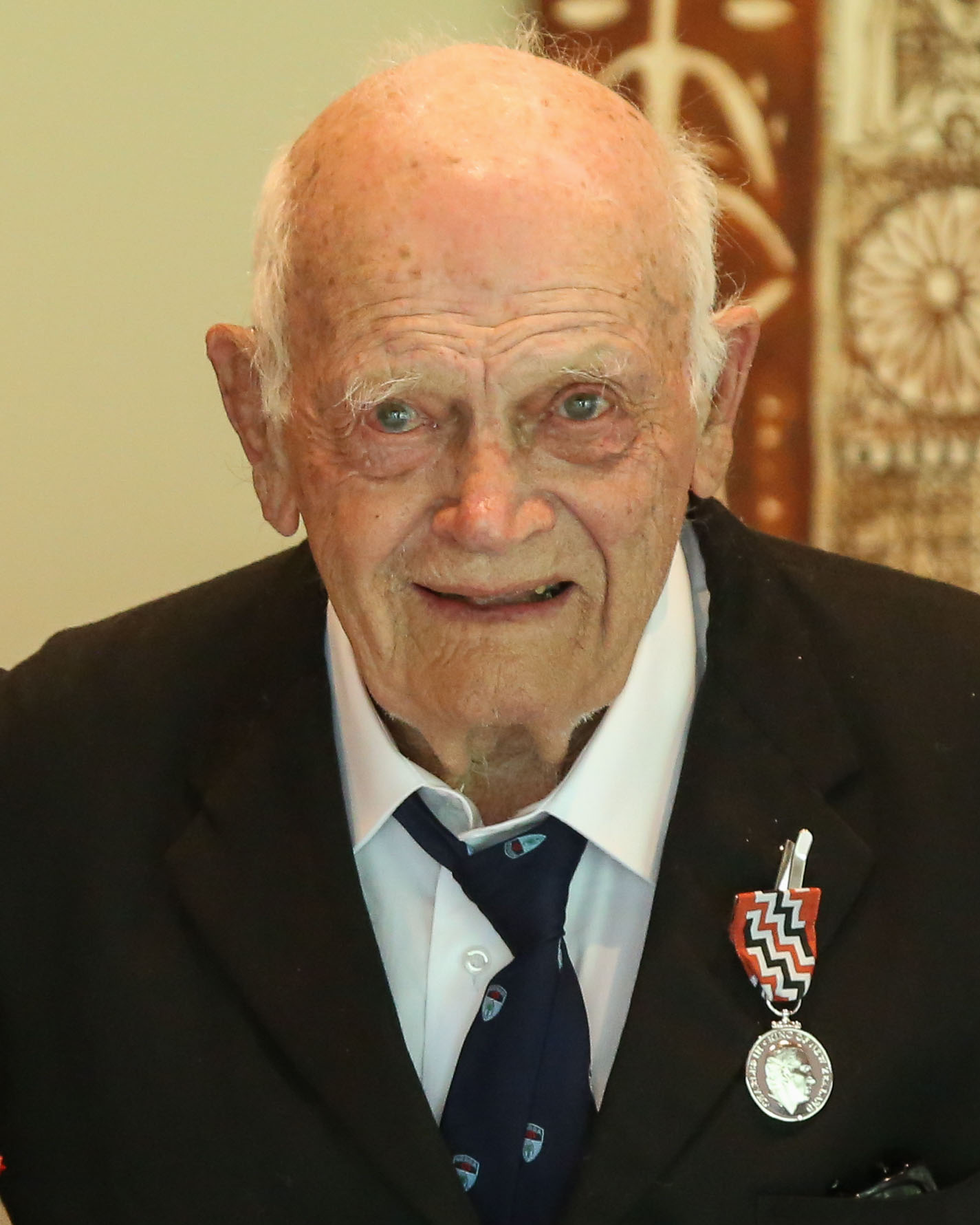
John Coleman

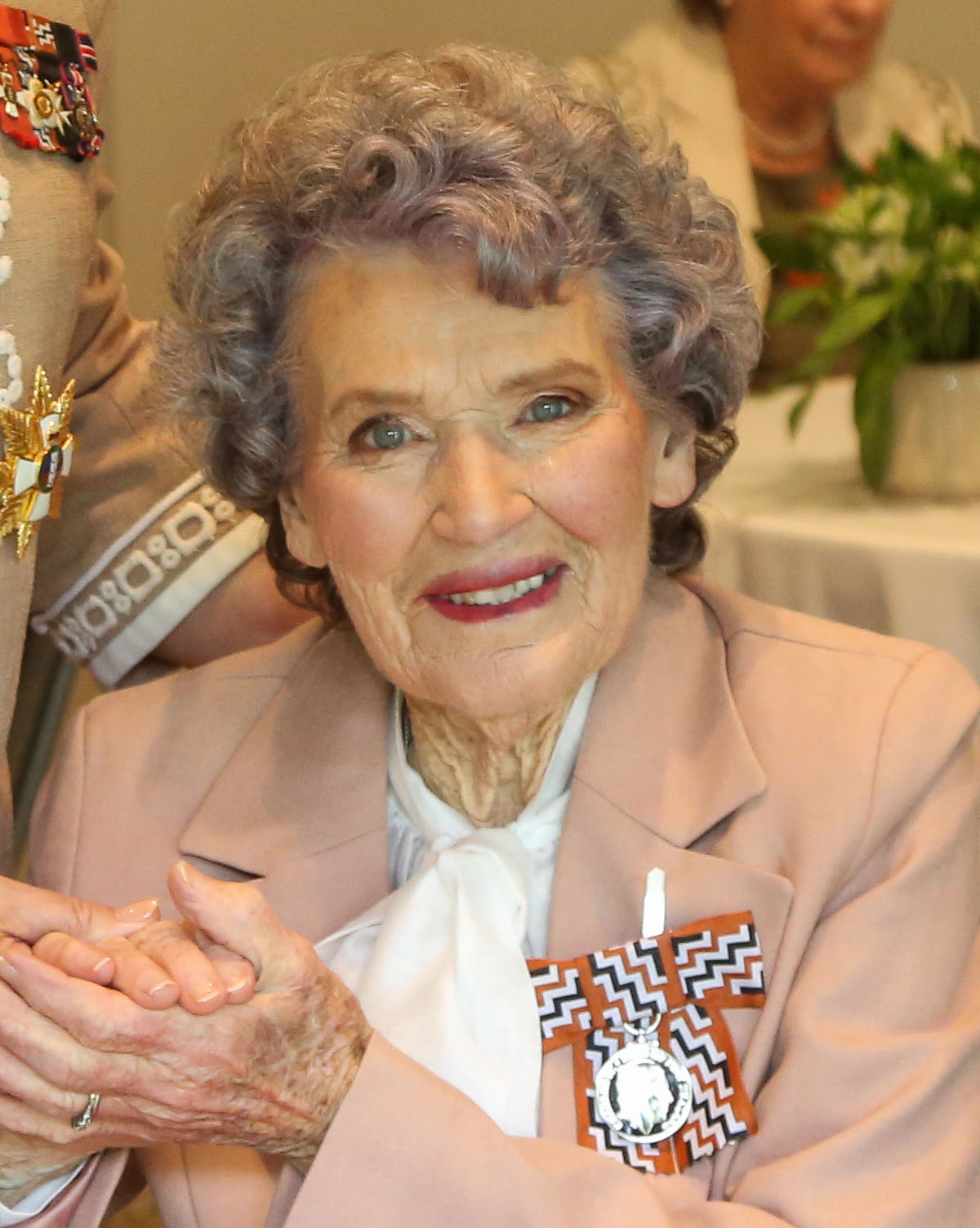
Lily Coleman

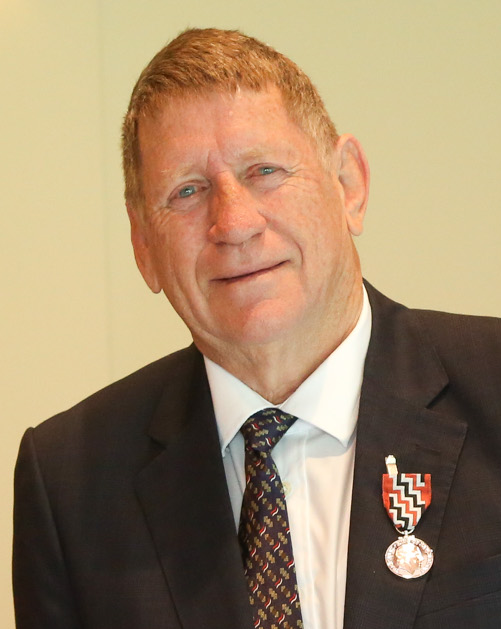
Ross Cooper

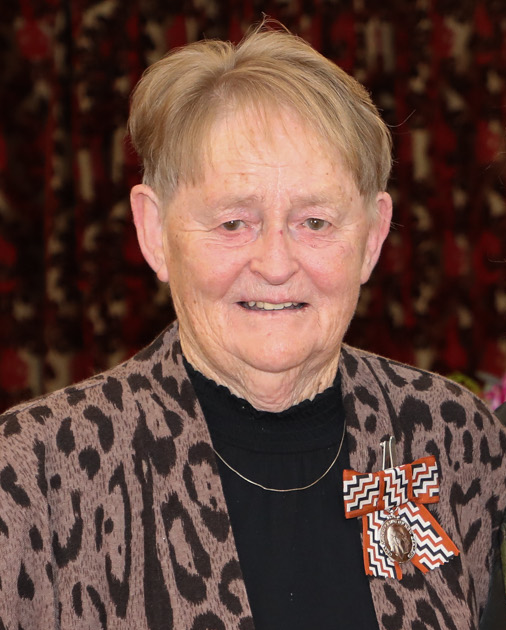
Margaret Cousins

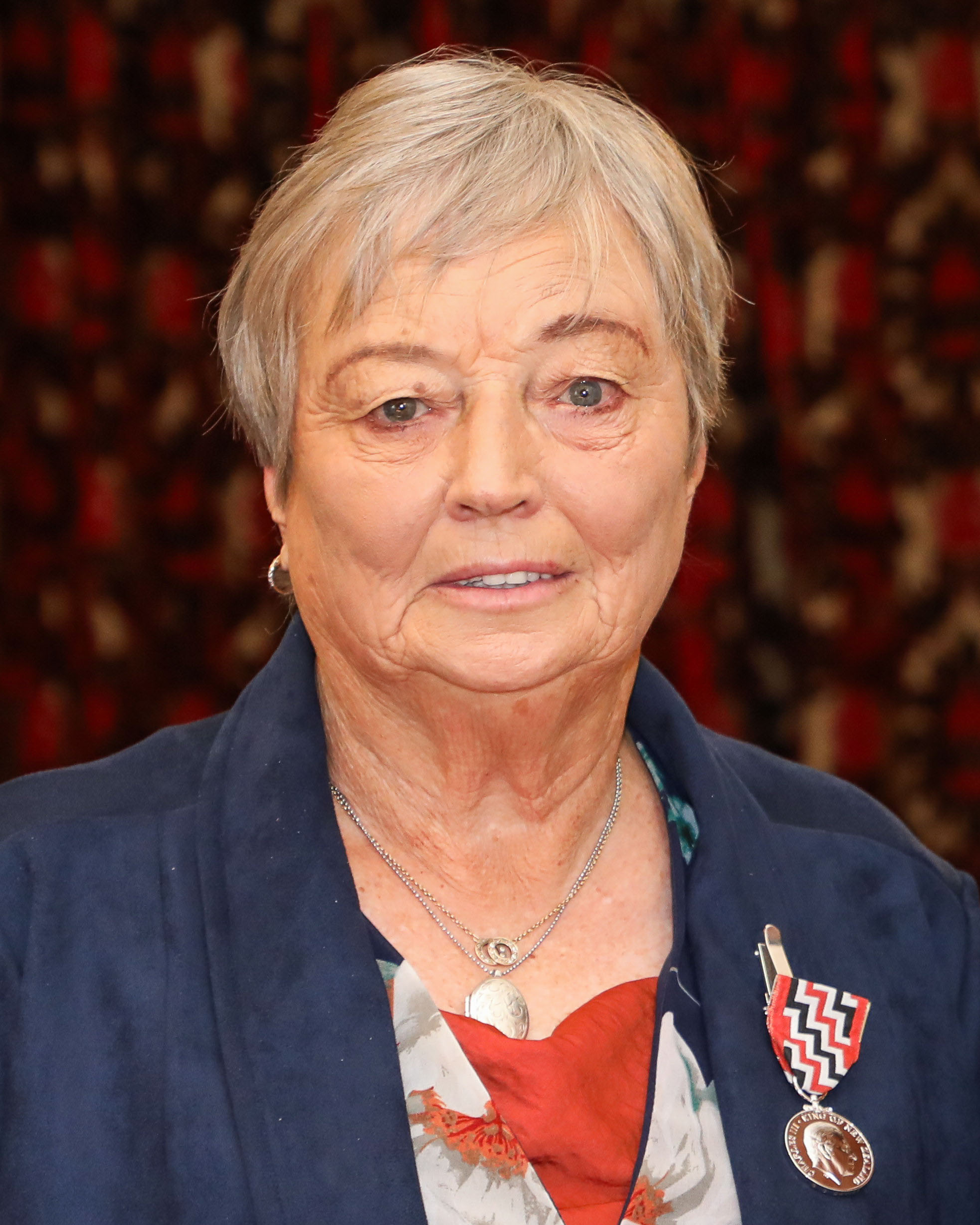
Glenda Davies

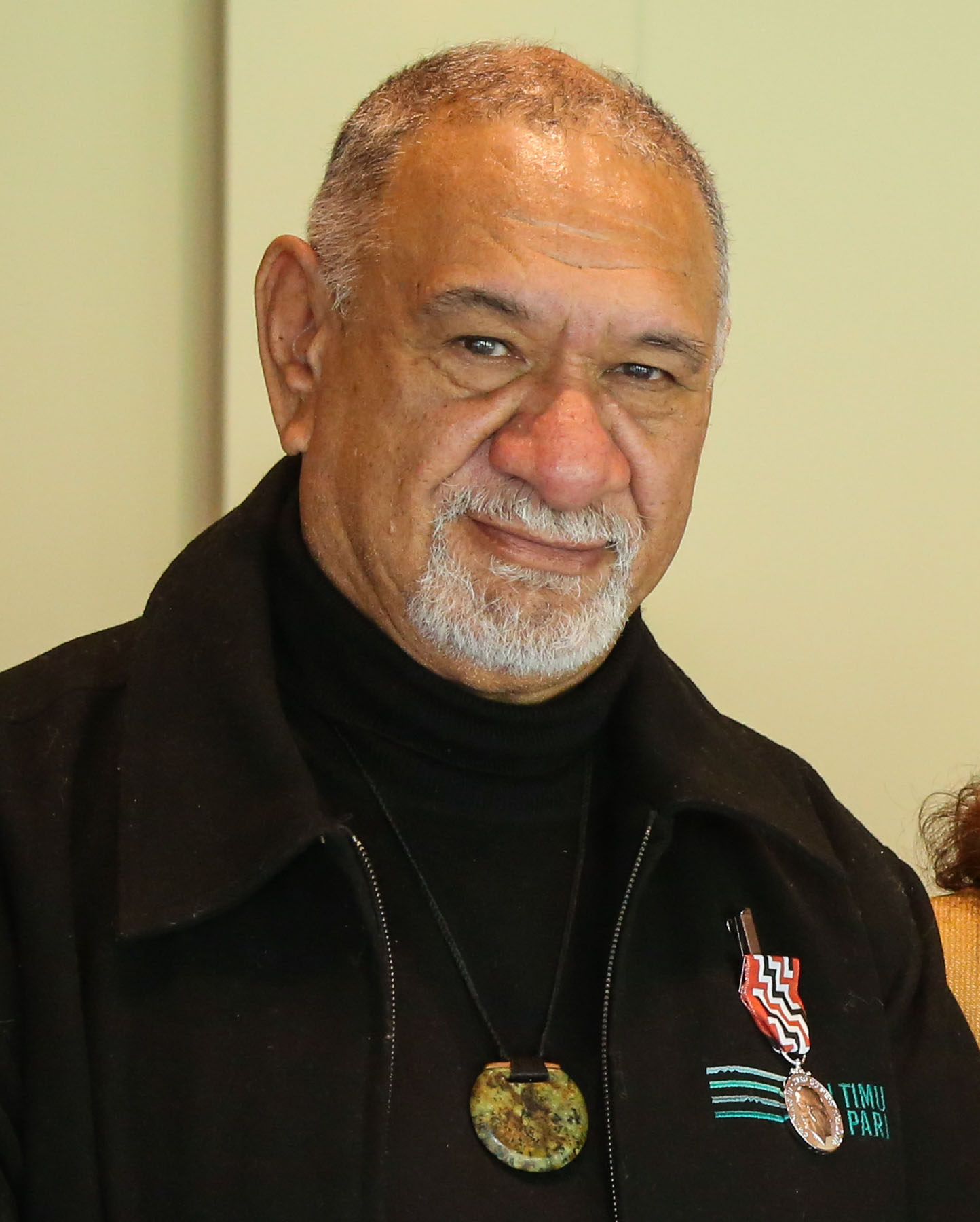
Ngahau Davis

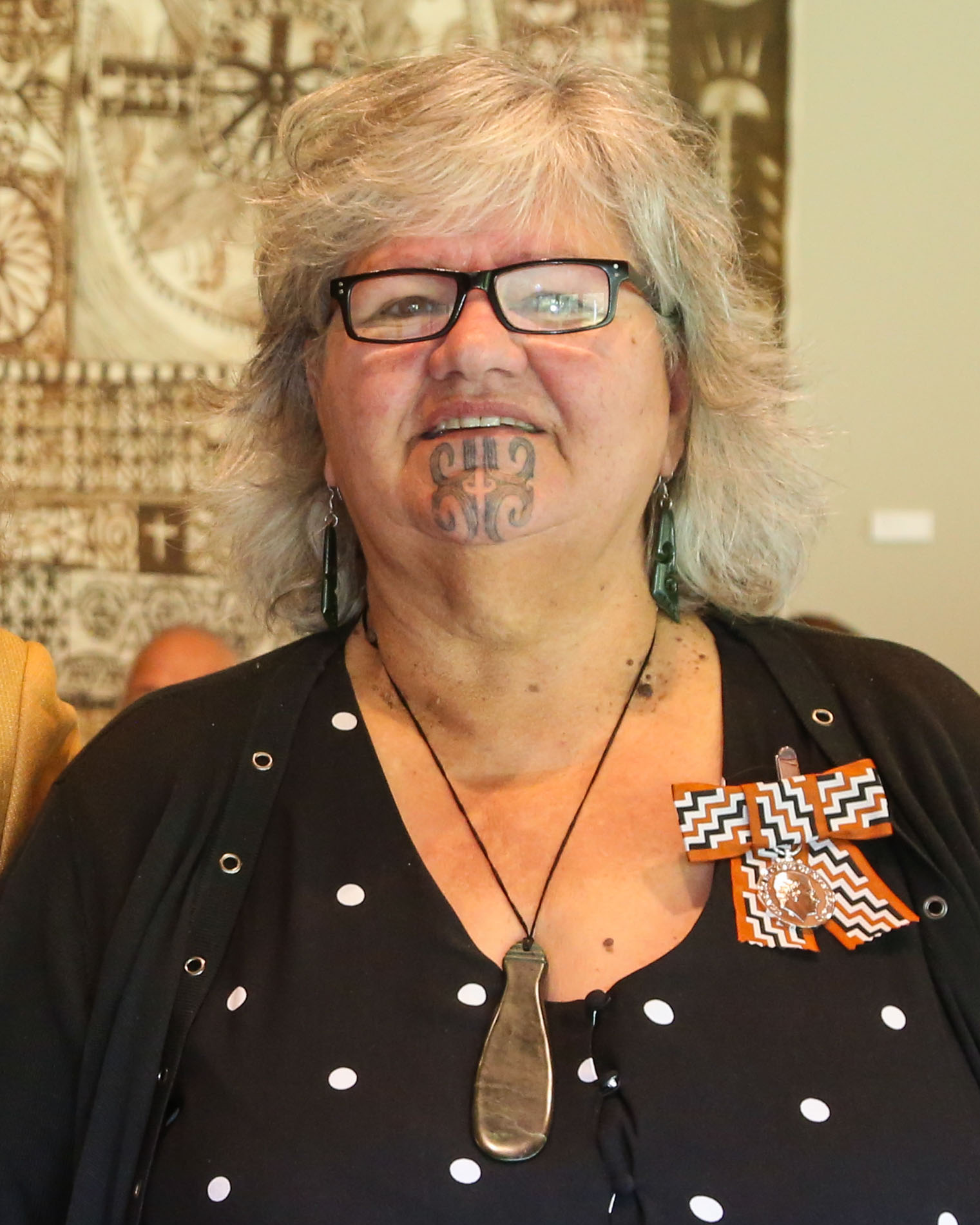
Debbie Davis

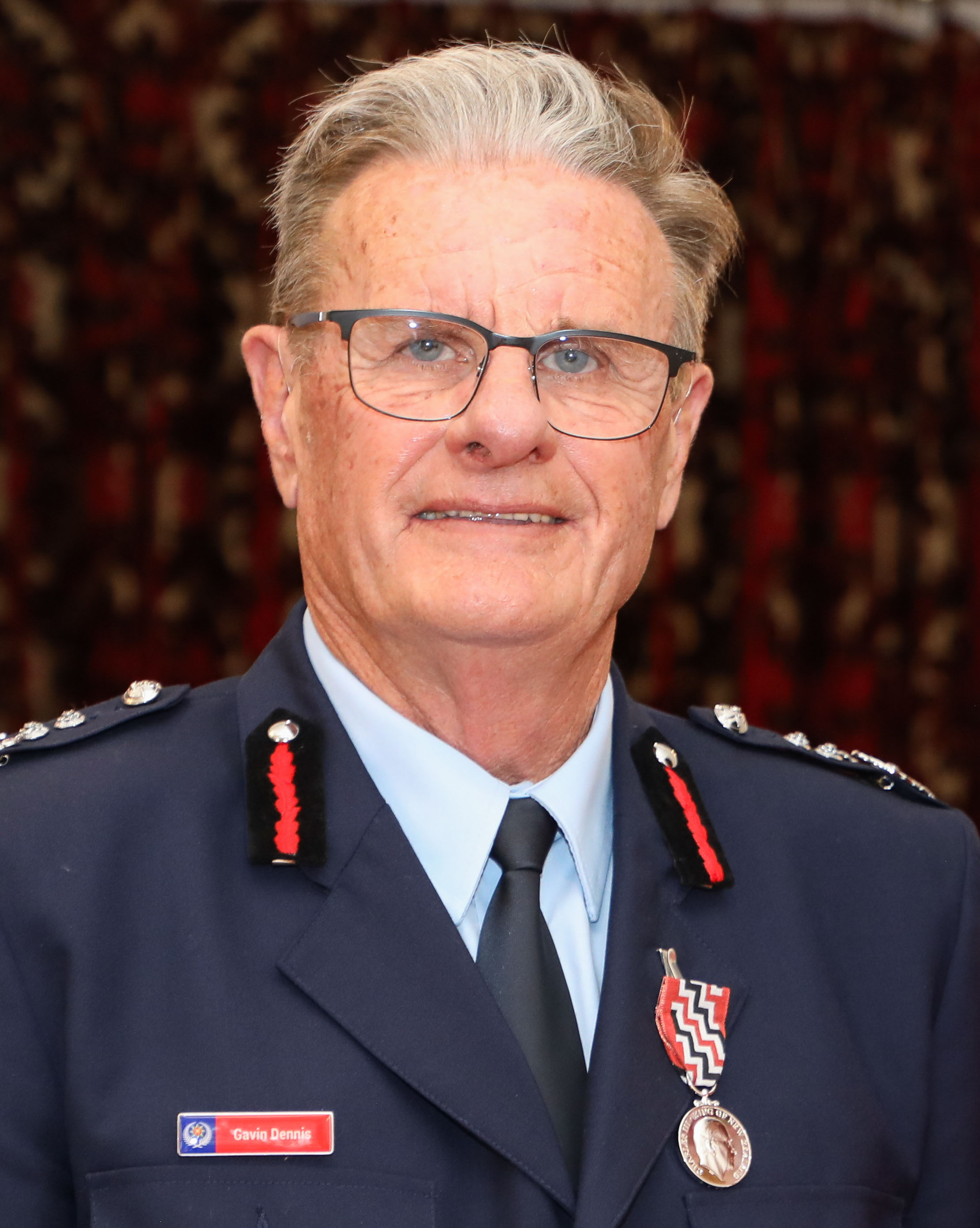
Gavin Dennis

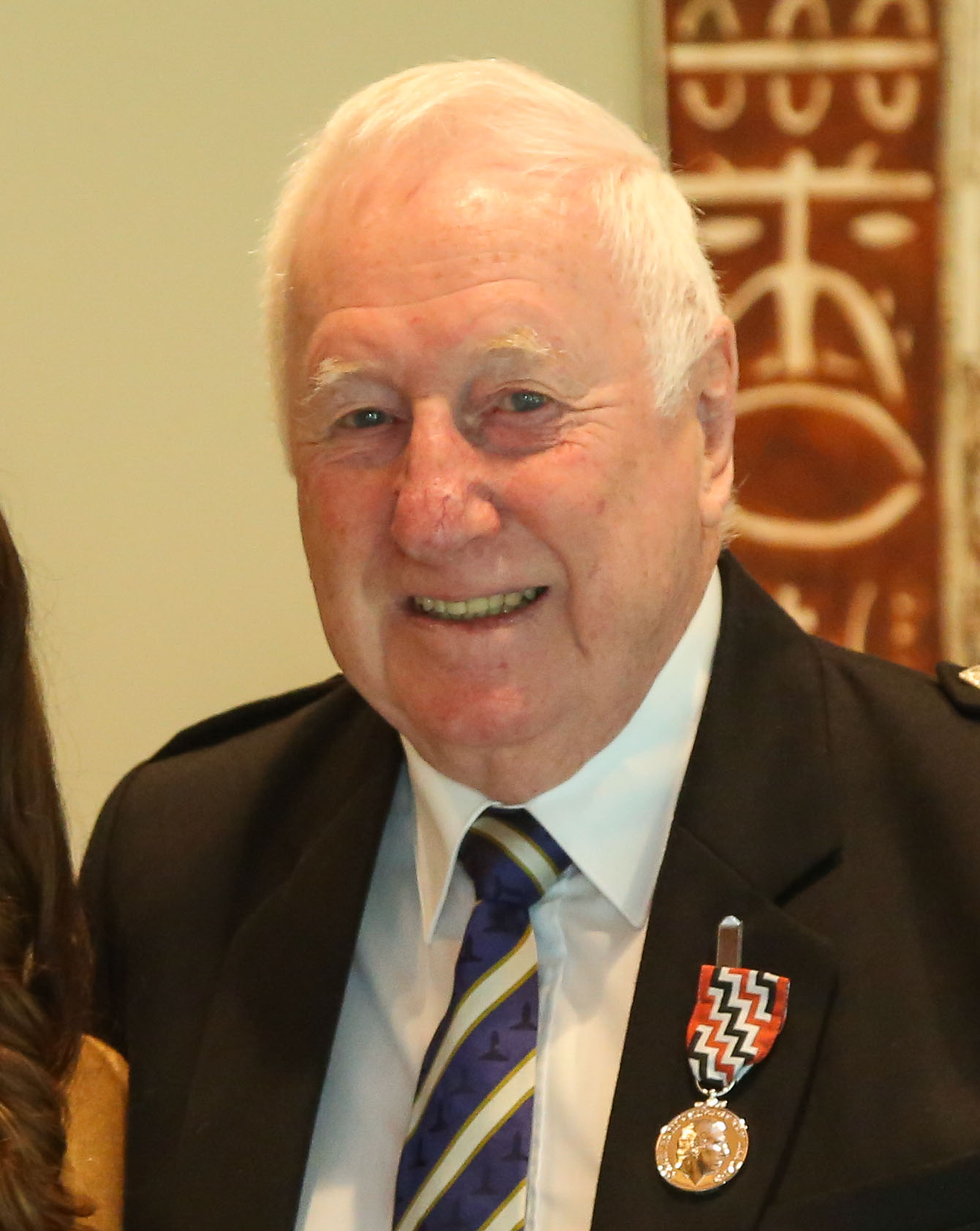
Eddie Eeles

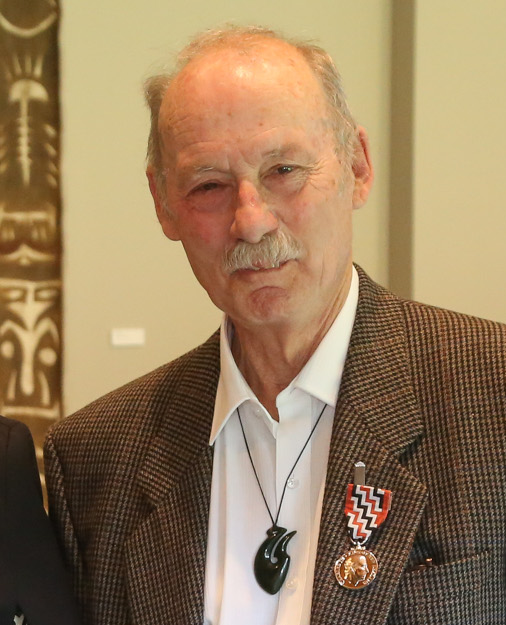
Tony Enderby

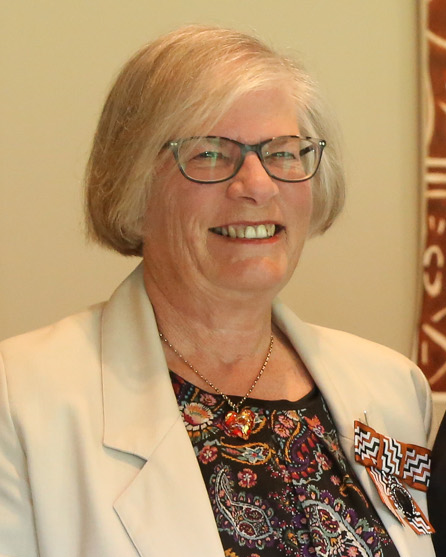
Jenny Enderby

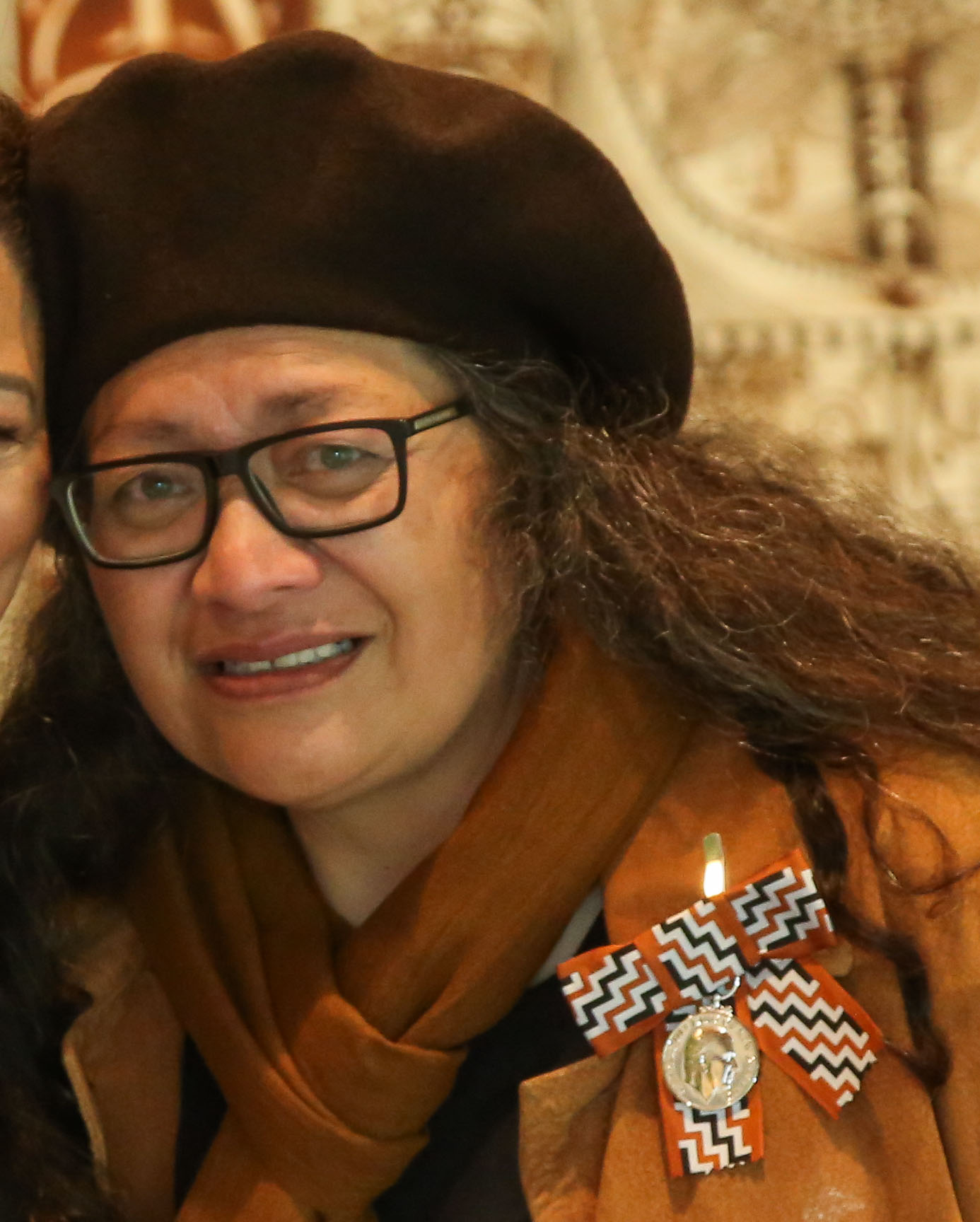
Zora Feilo

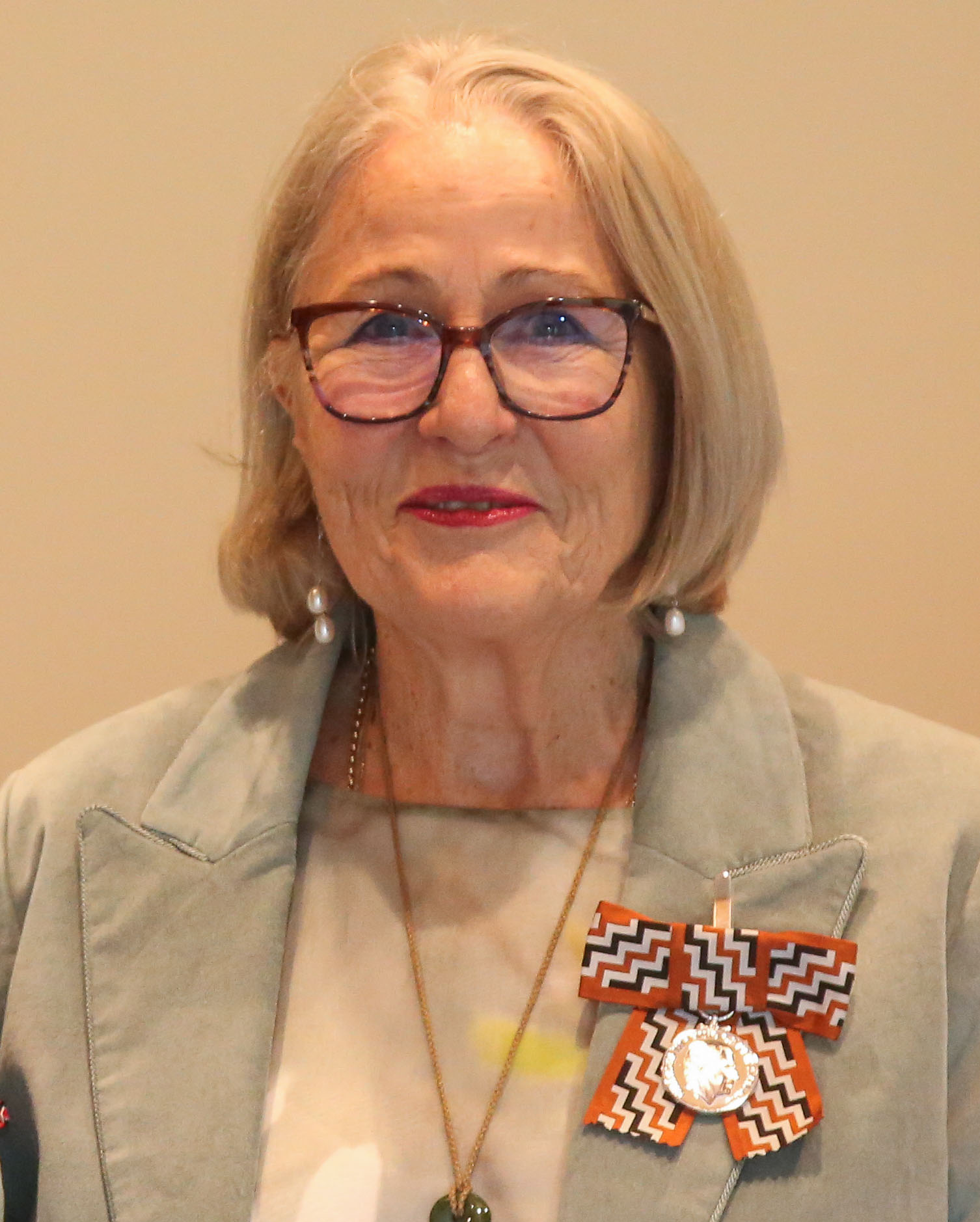
Pene Frost

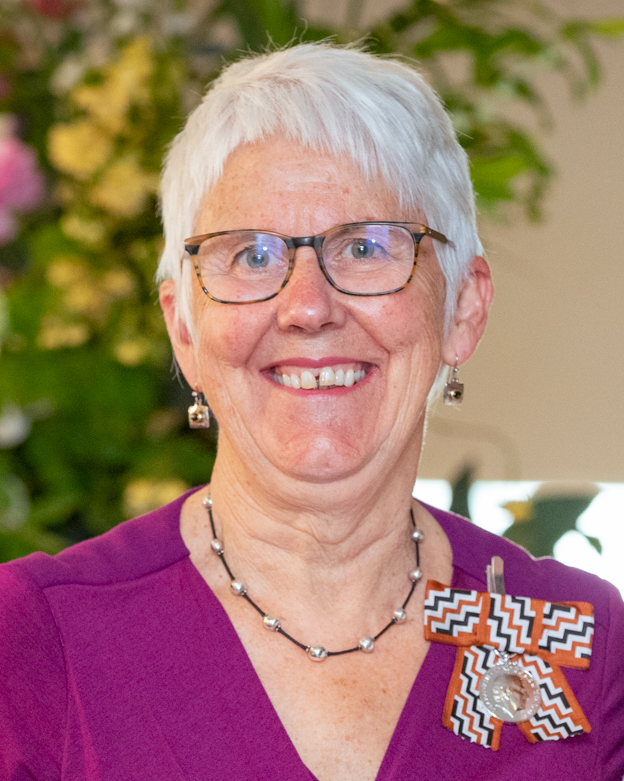
Tina Gilbertson

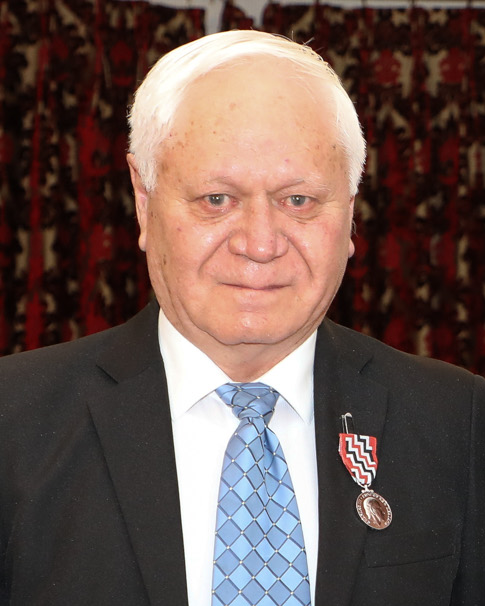
Butch Green

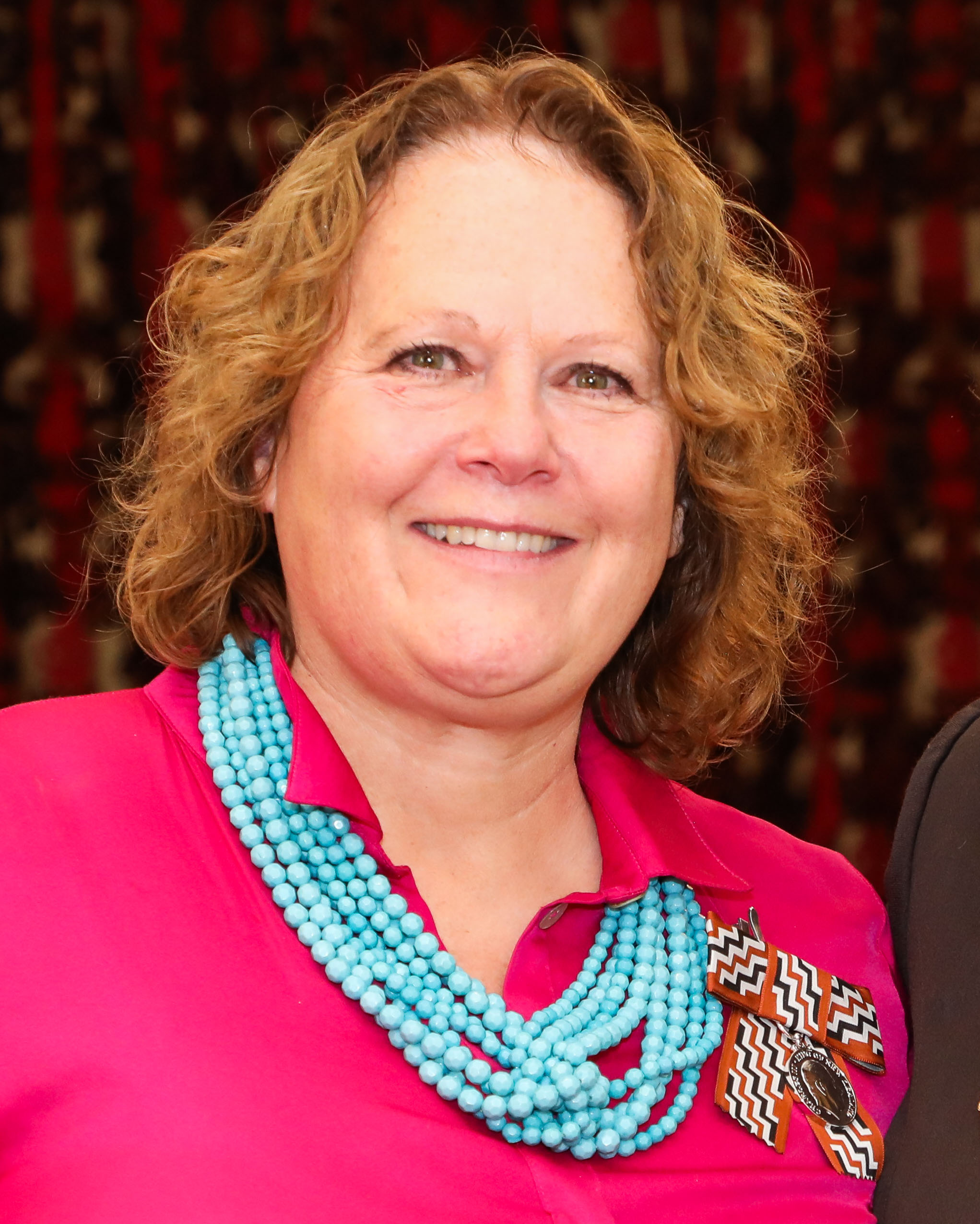
Heidi Griffin

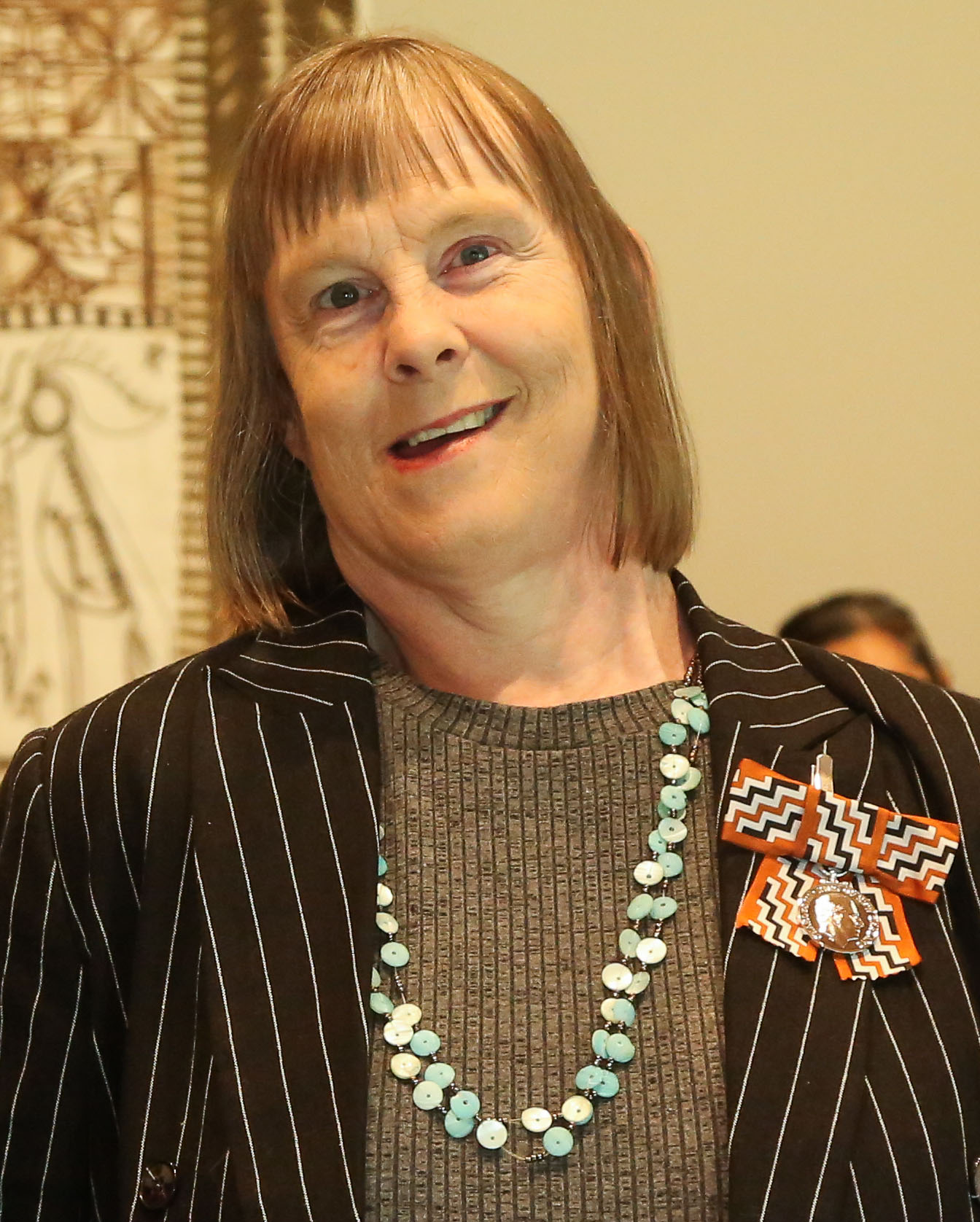
Allyson Hamblett

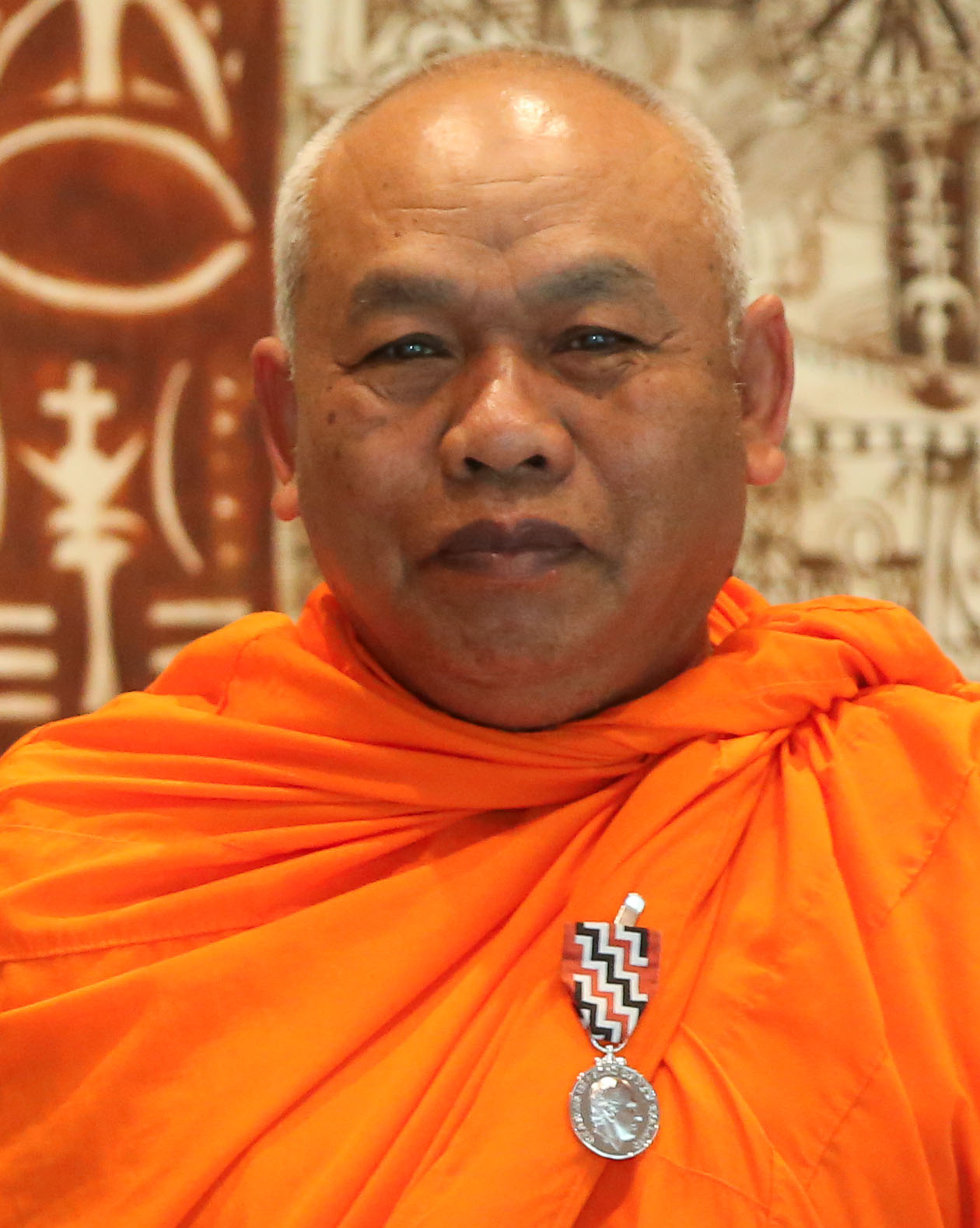
Sohim Hay

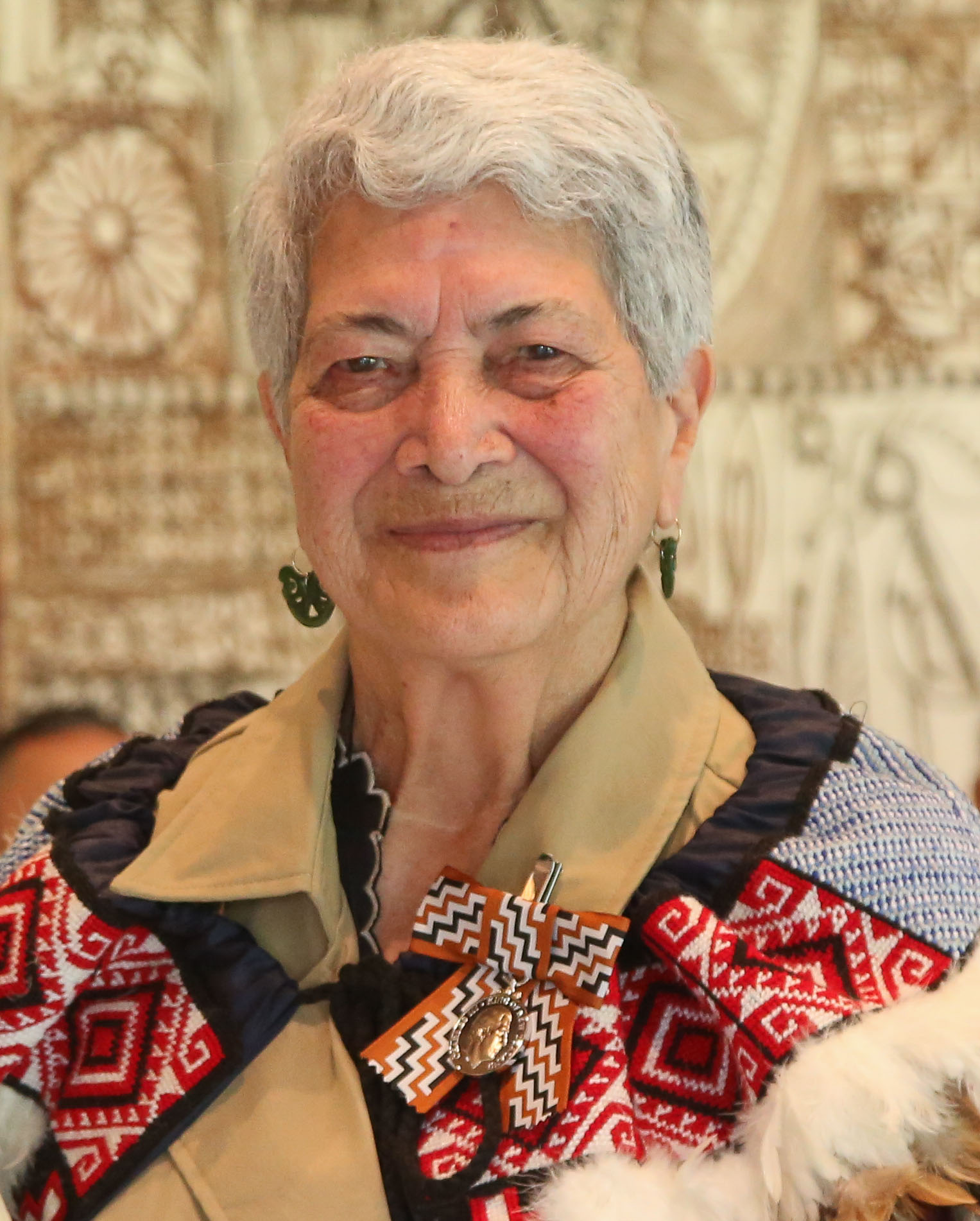
Bina Hepi

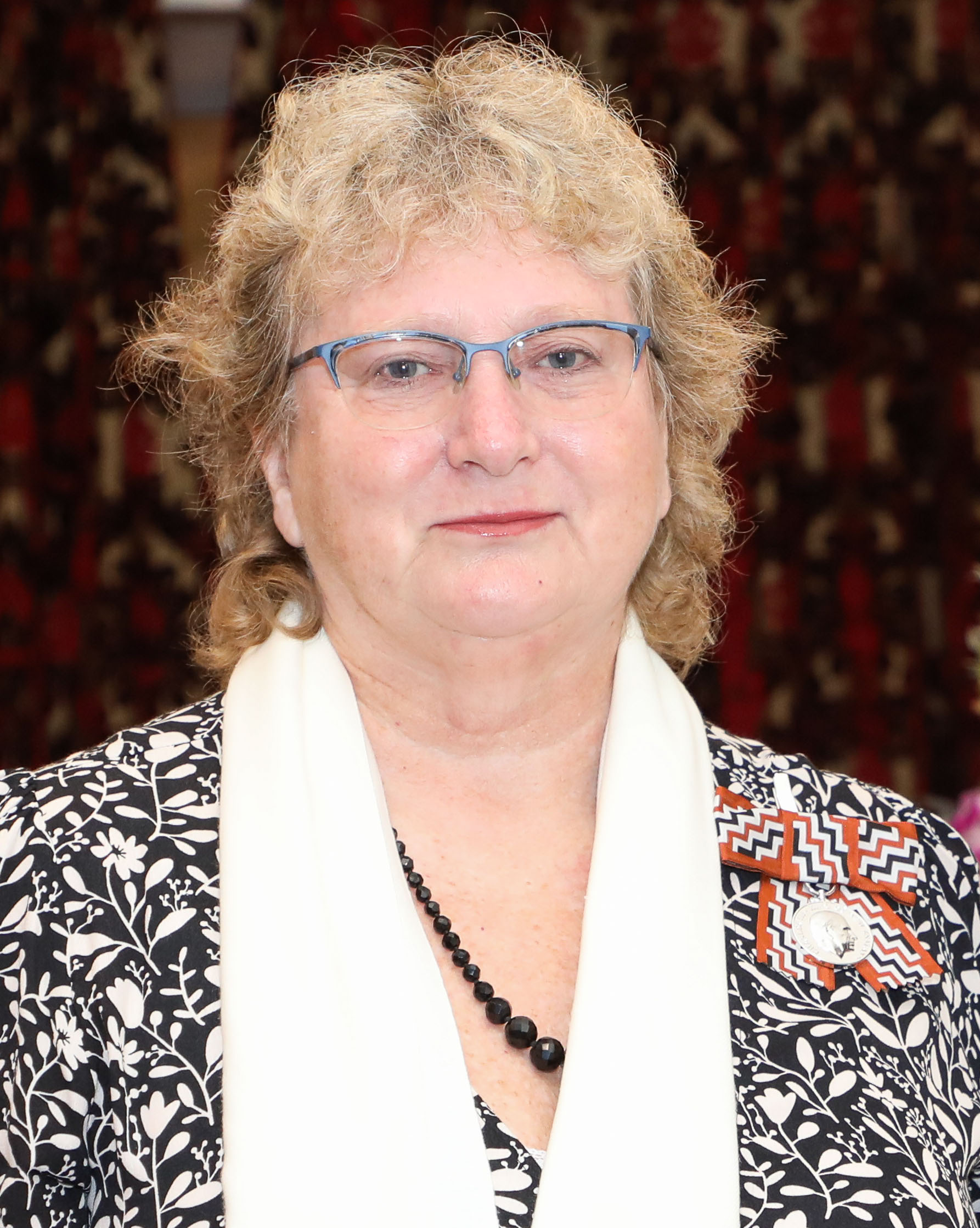
Nicky Rawlings

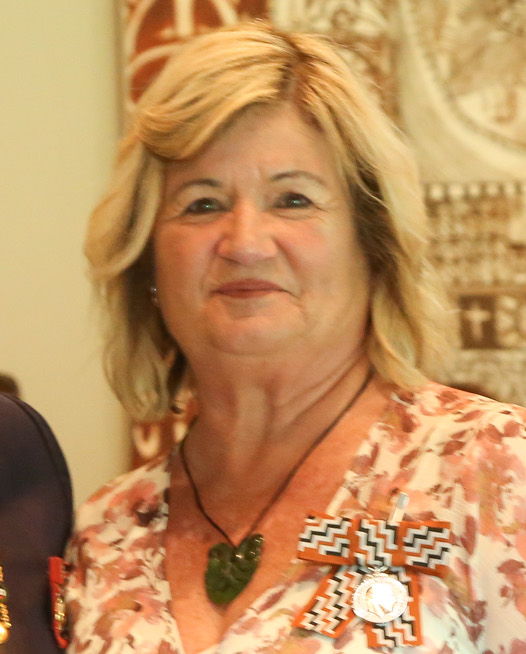
Luen Hoani

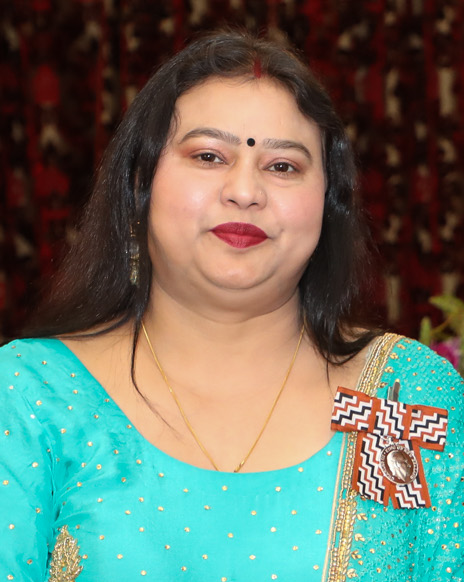
Parminder Kaur

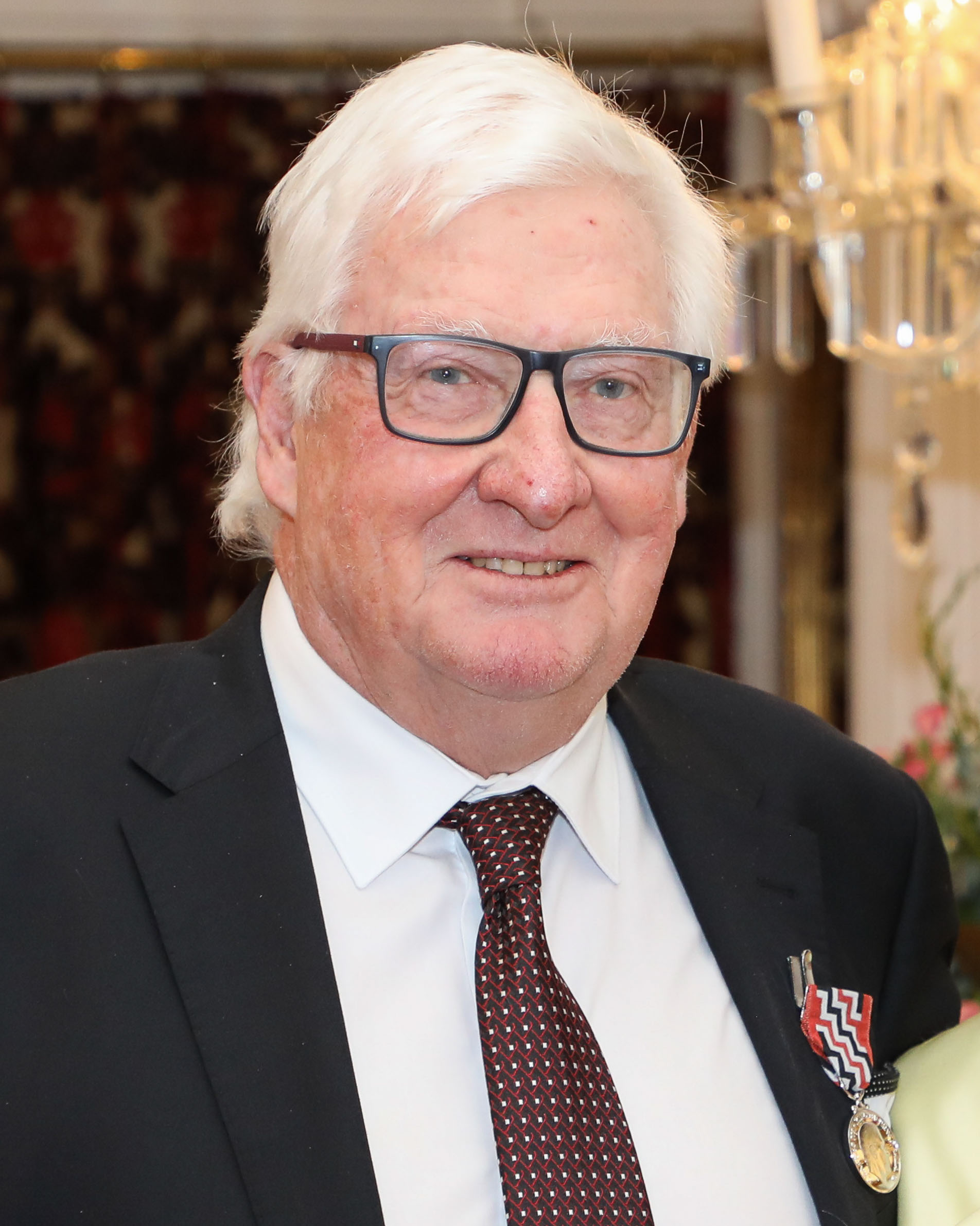
Kevin Loe

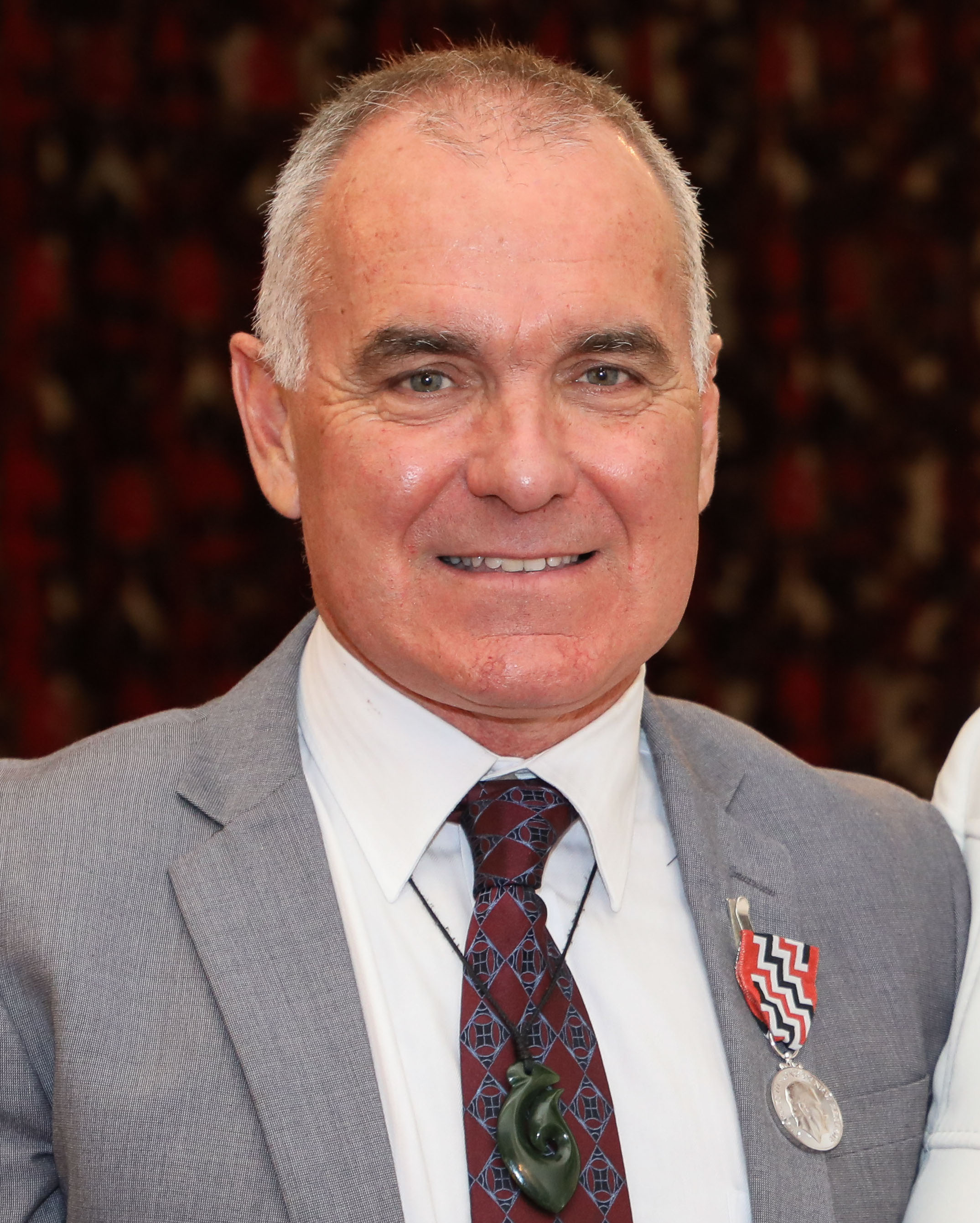
Tim Marshall

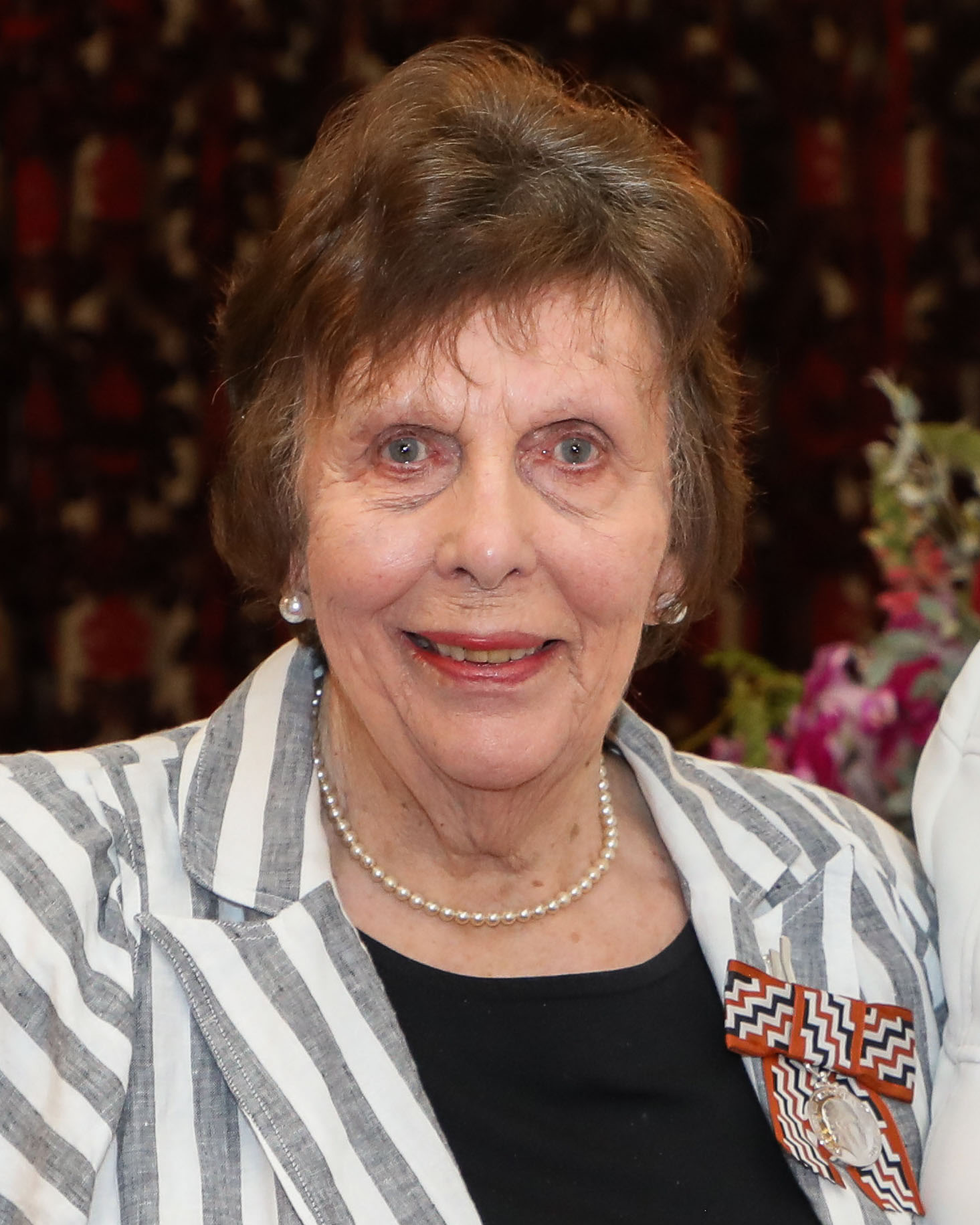
Anne McCracken

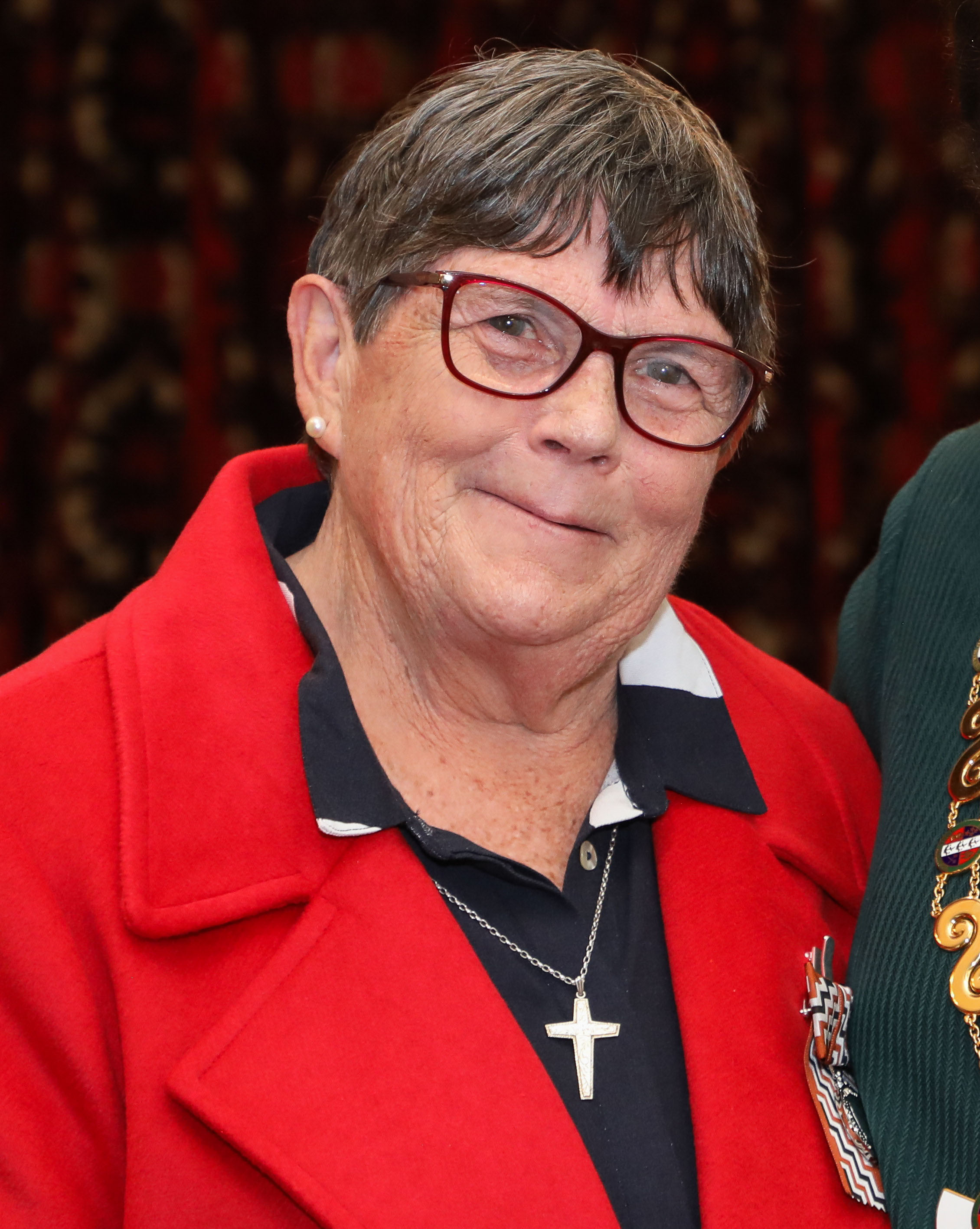
Rosie McMillan

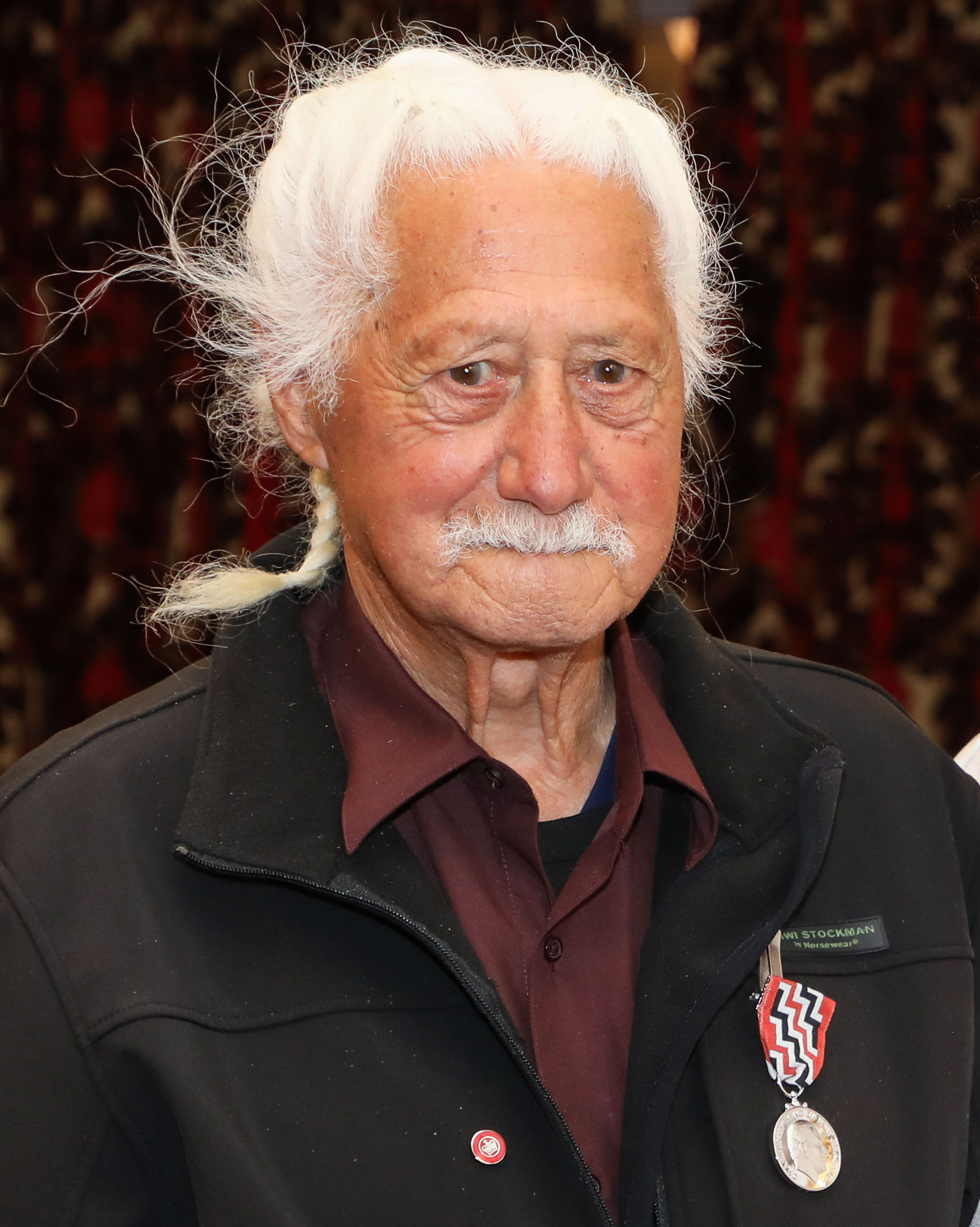
Clem Mellish

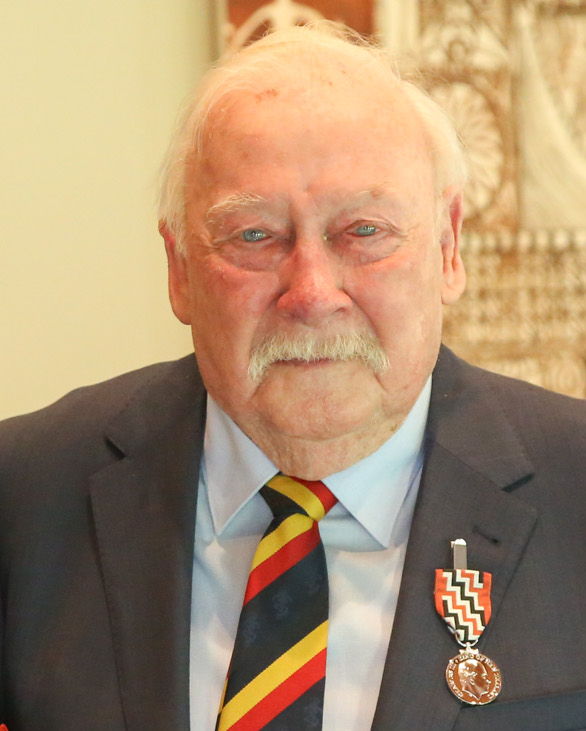
Fred Milligan

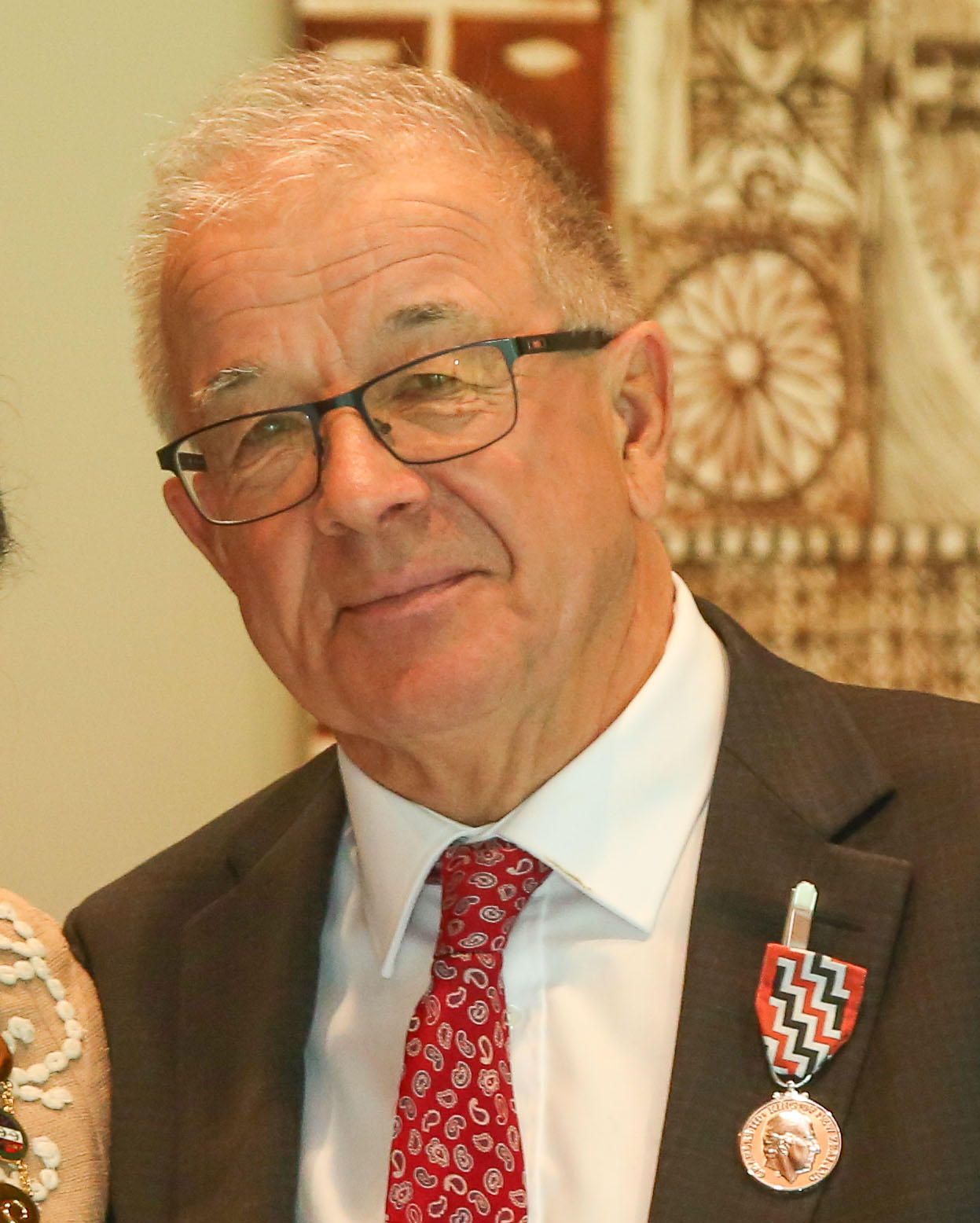
Fergus More

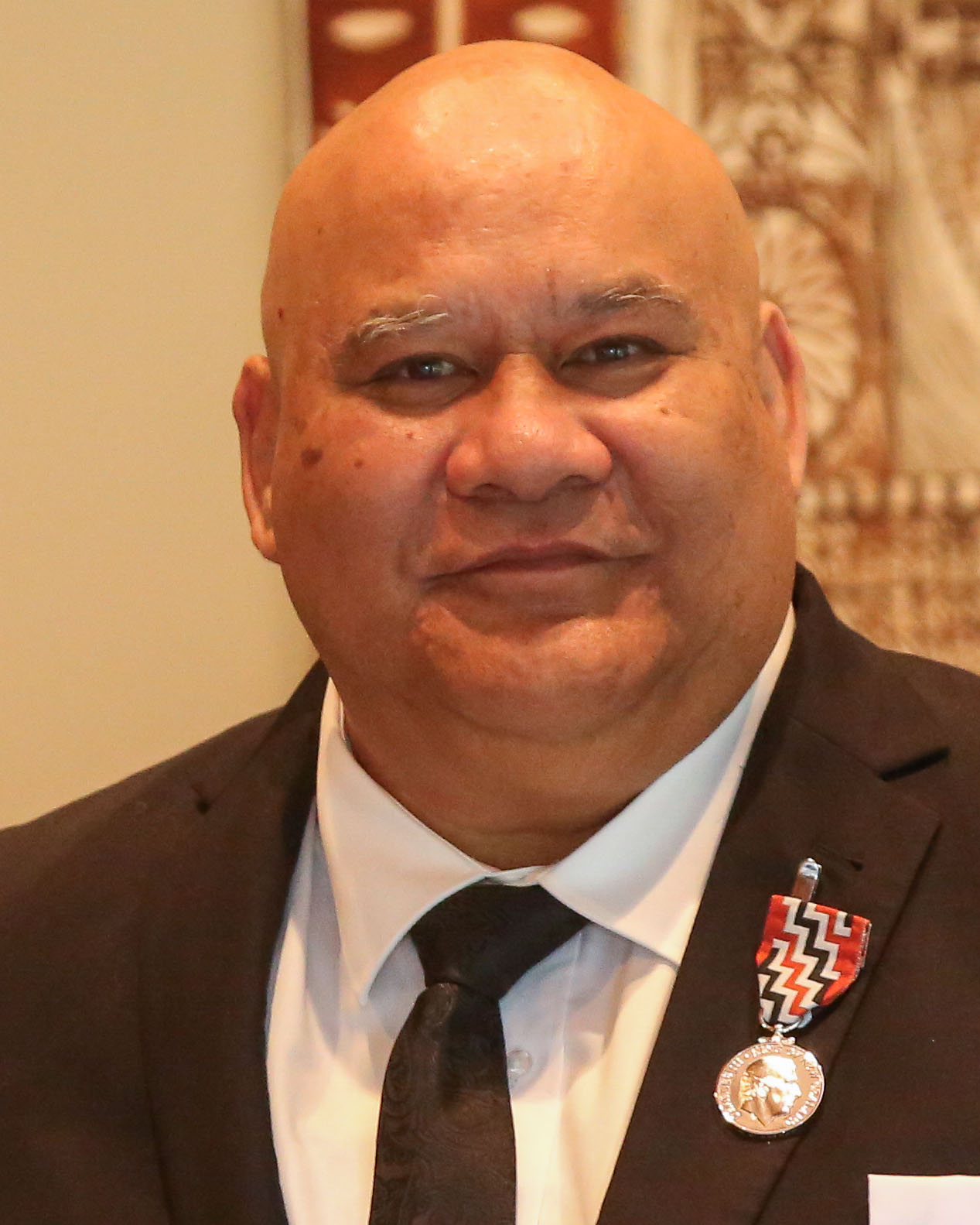
Kereama Nathan

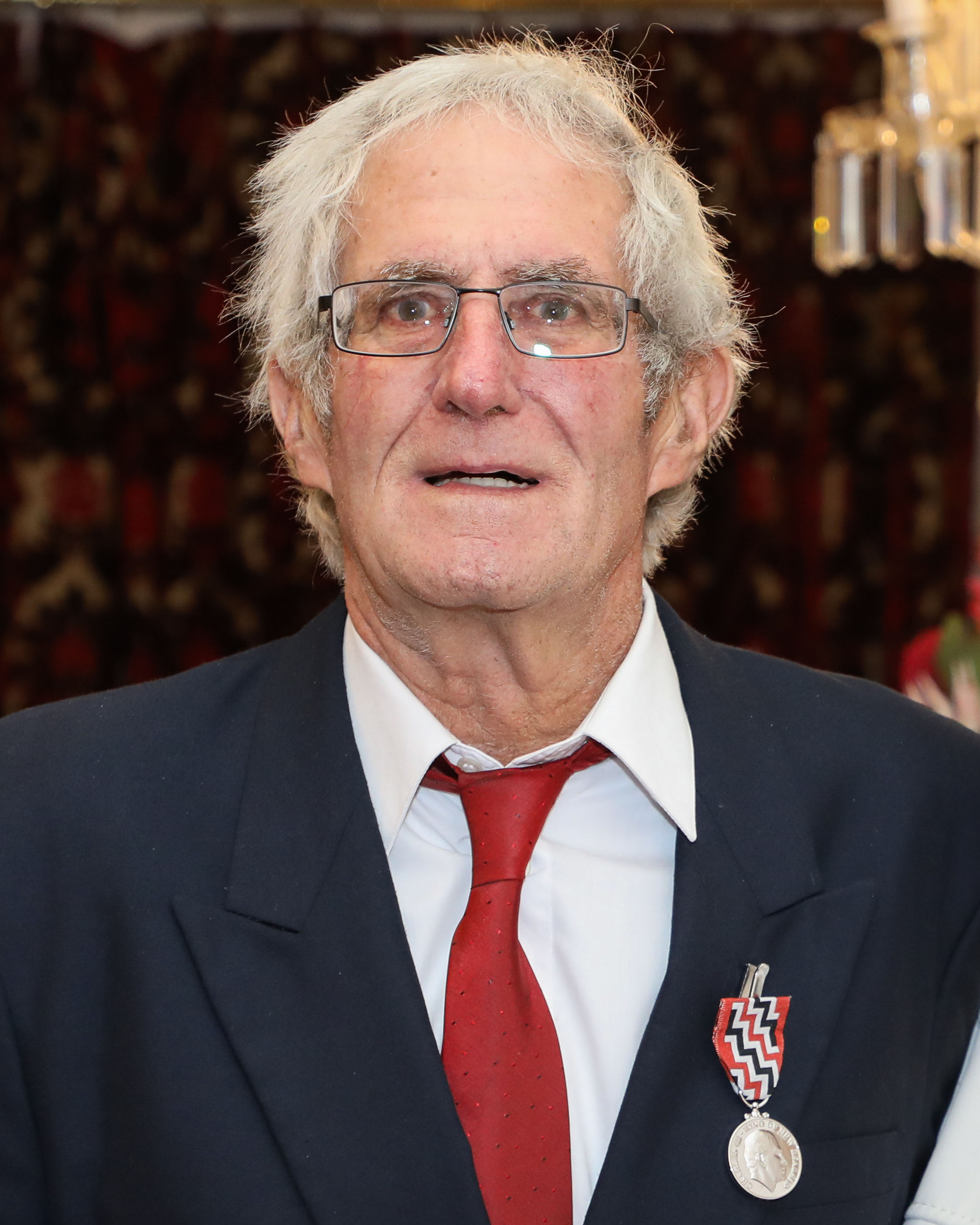
Terry O'Regan

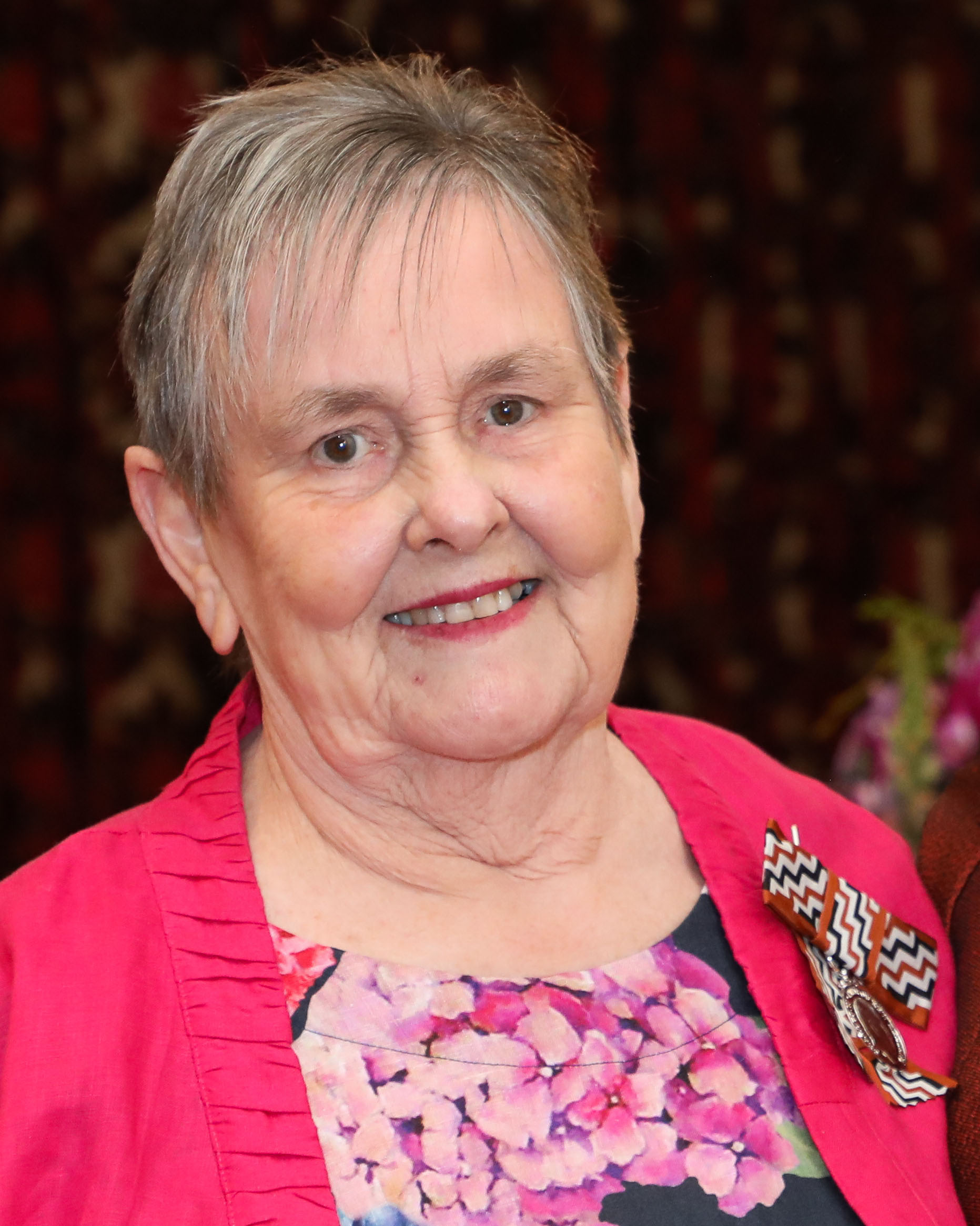
Alison Perrin

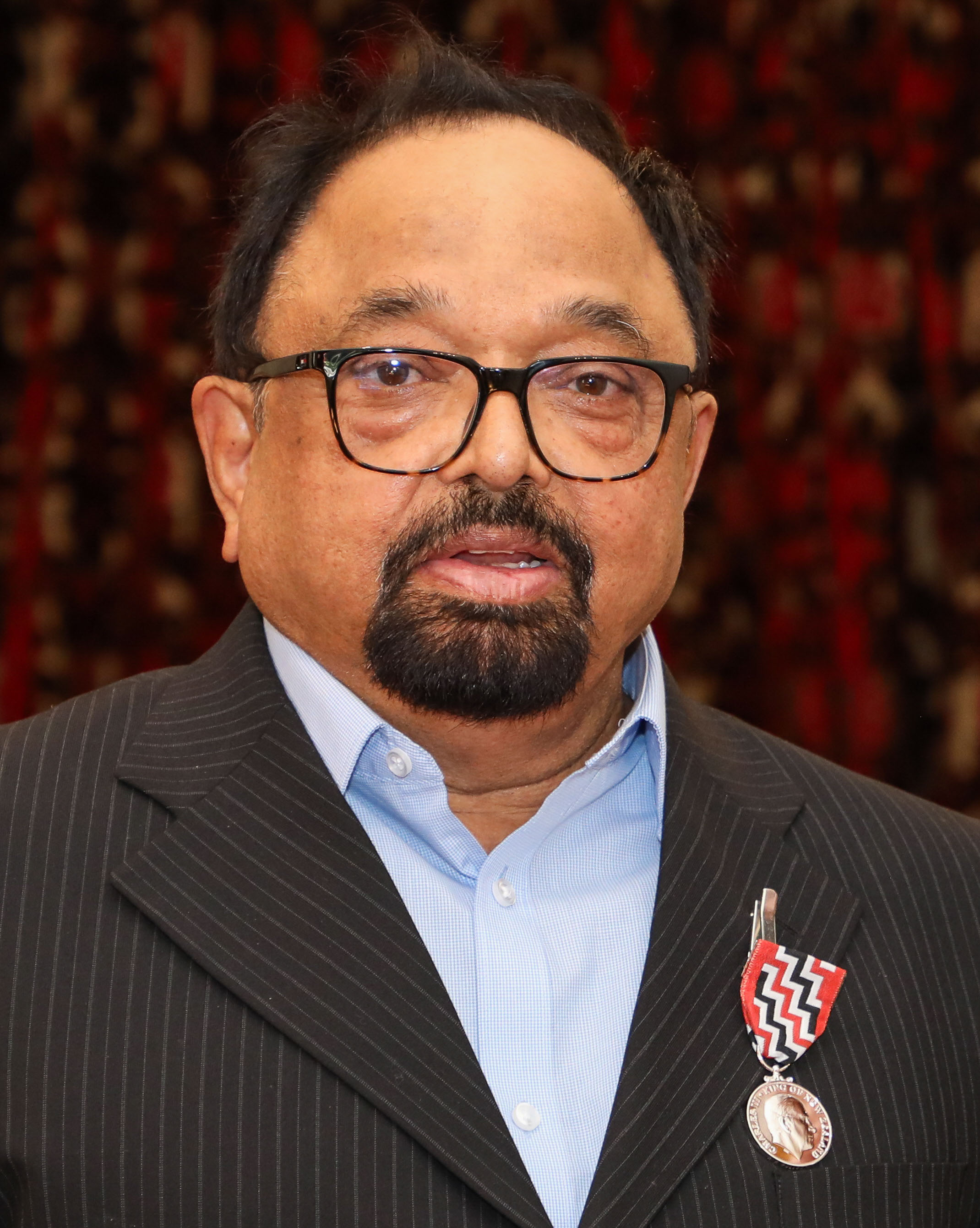
Narayanan Pulloothpadath

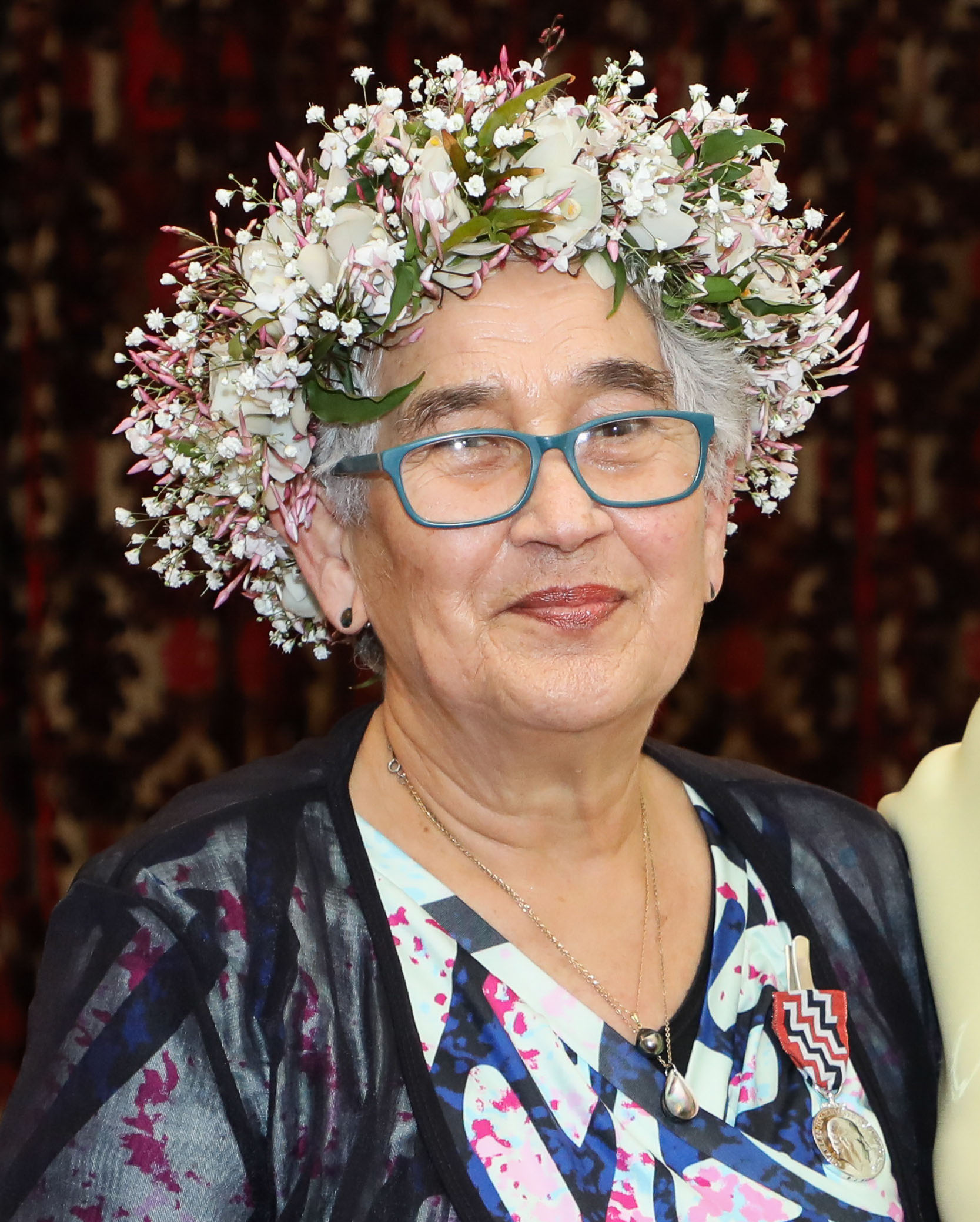
Berry Rangi

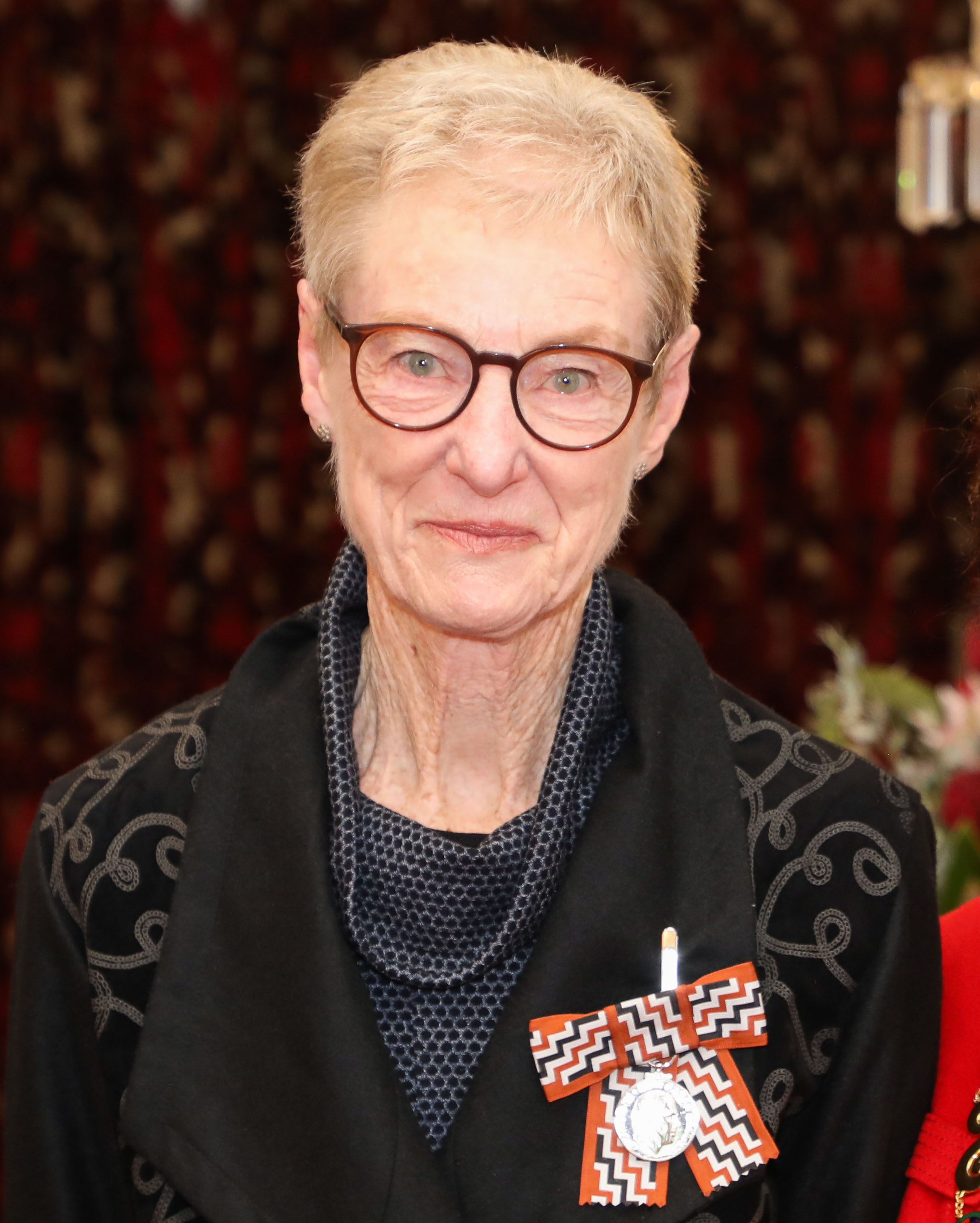
Karen Richards

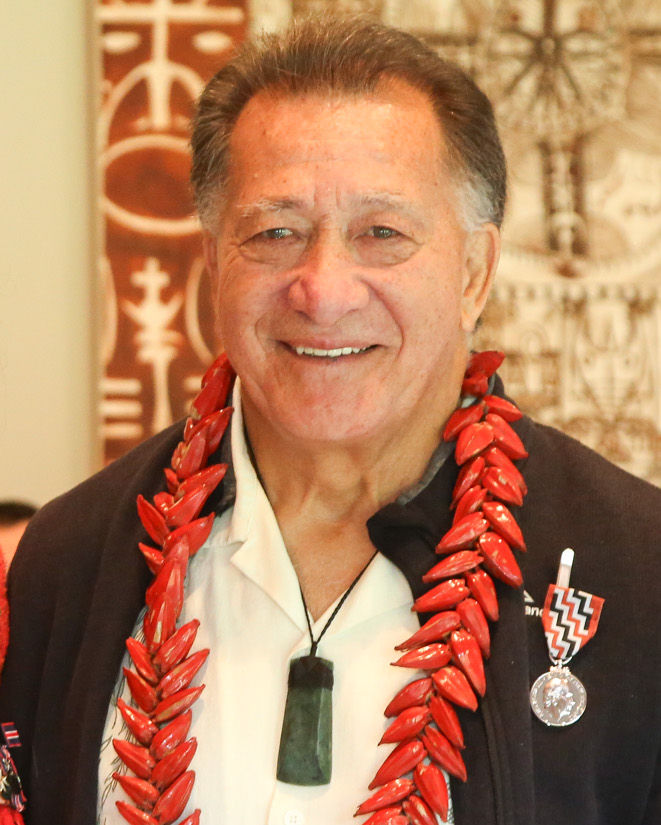
Johnny Siaosi

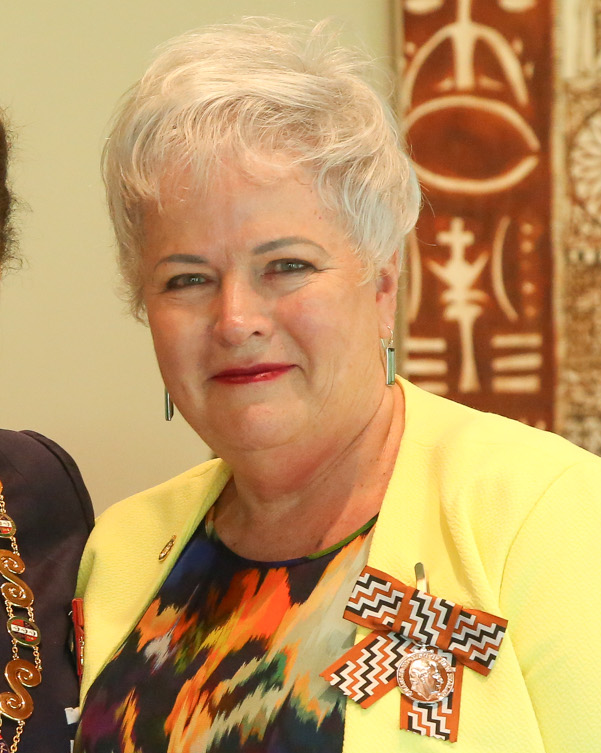
Rosemary Sloman

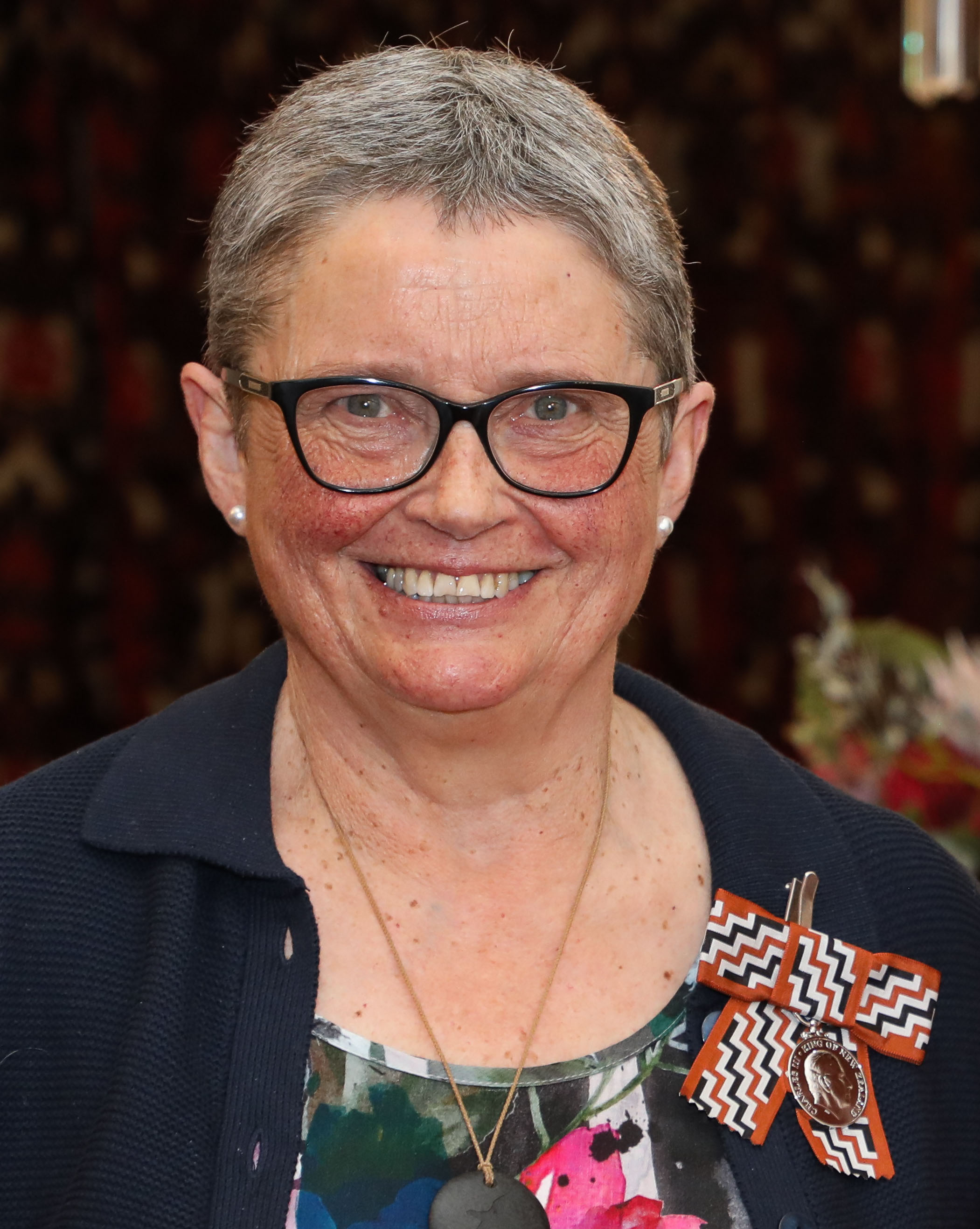
Jane Smallfield

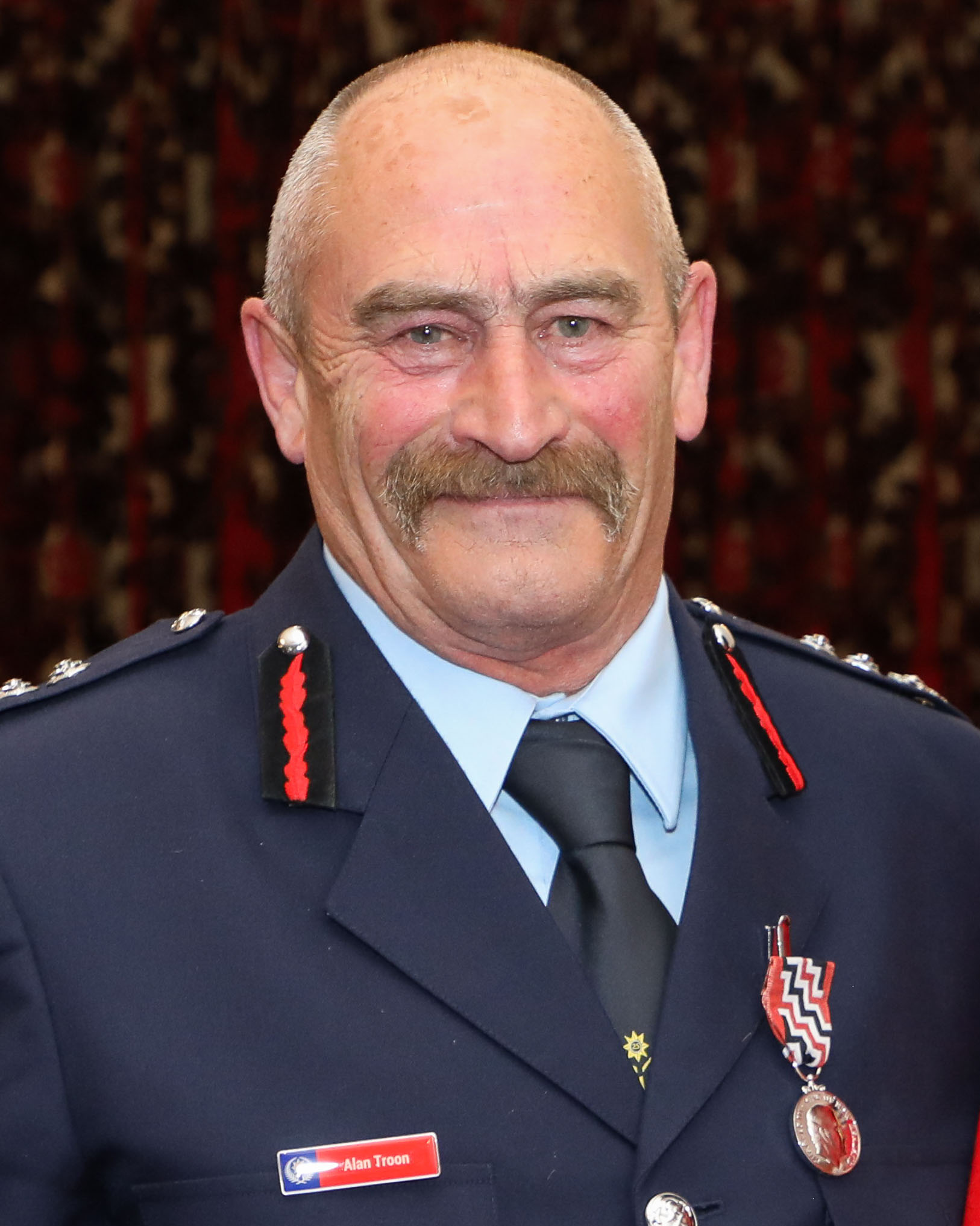
Alan Troon

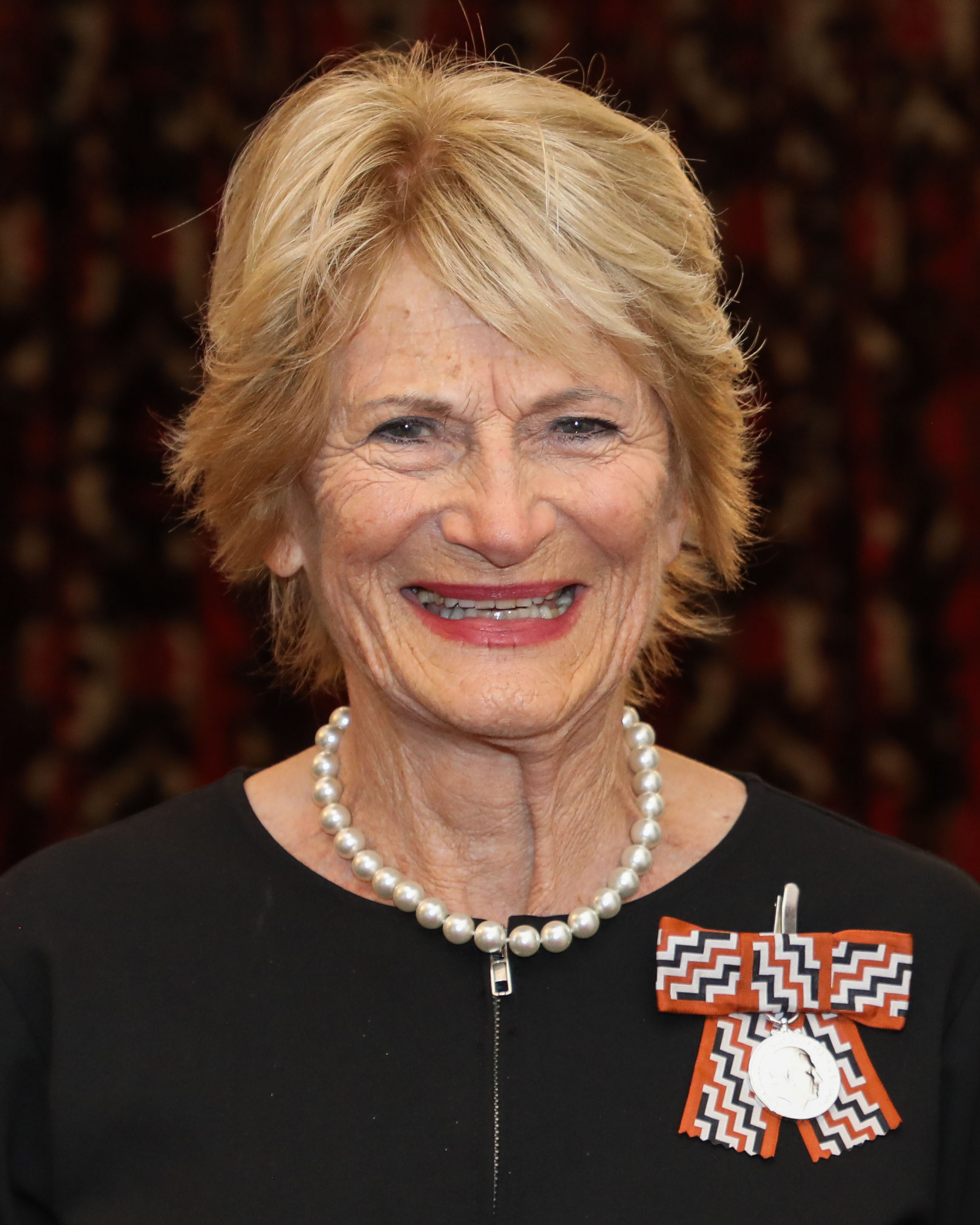
Jackie Watson

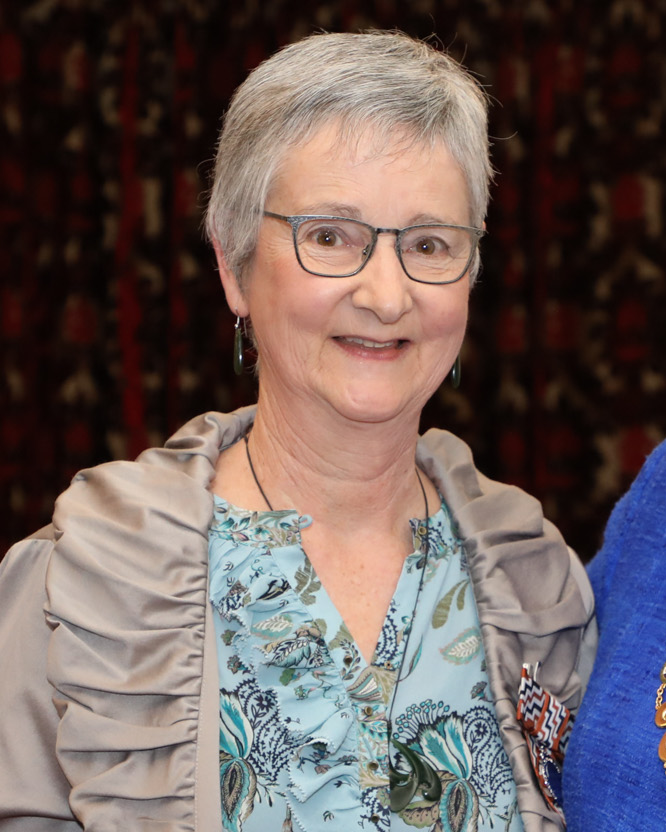
Glenys Weir

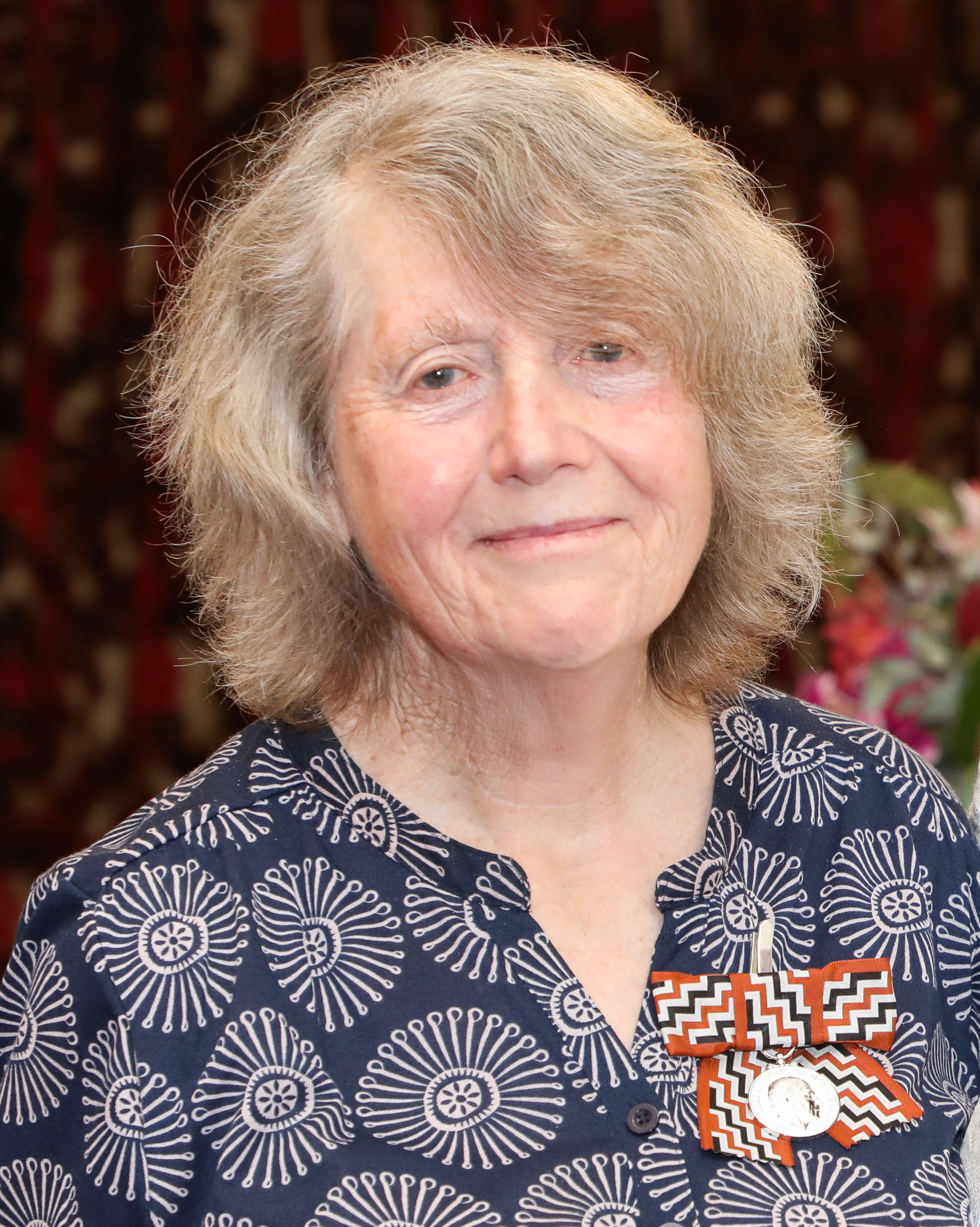
Merrilyn Withers

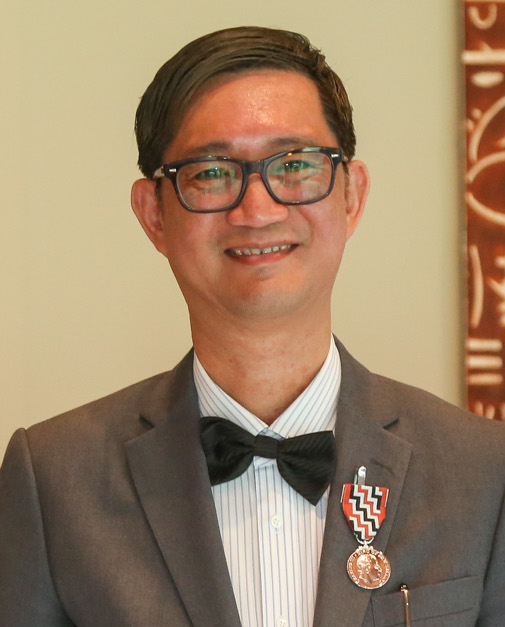
Yuanyong Yang

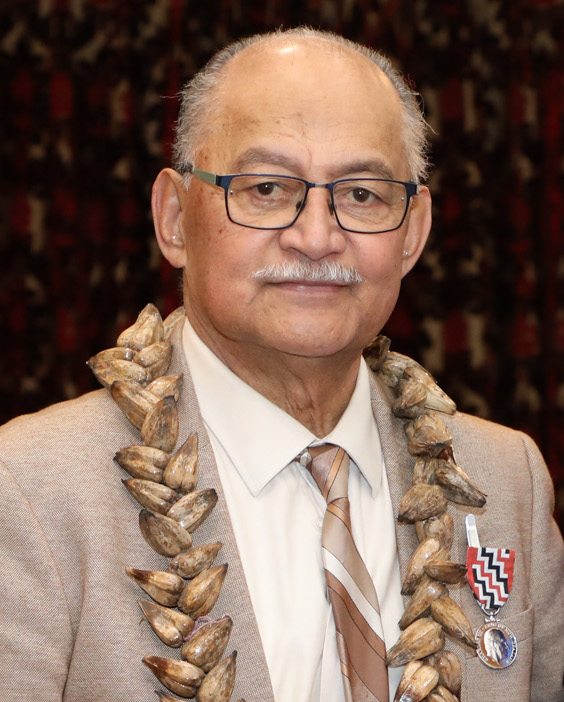
Eddie Fa'avae

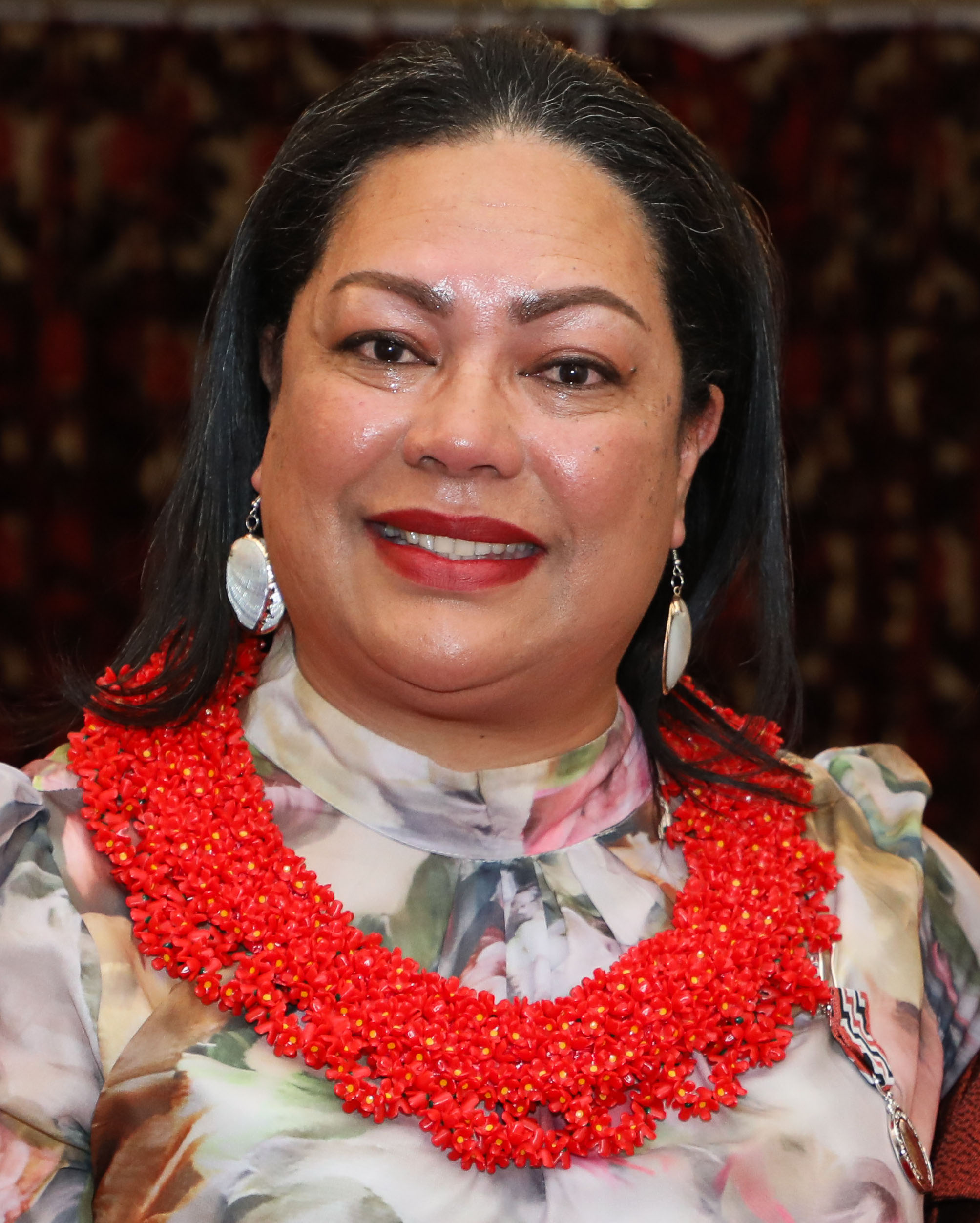
Sina Latu
