= Corn-Cob (livery) =

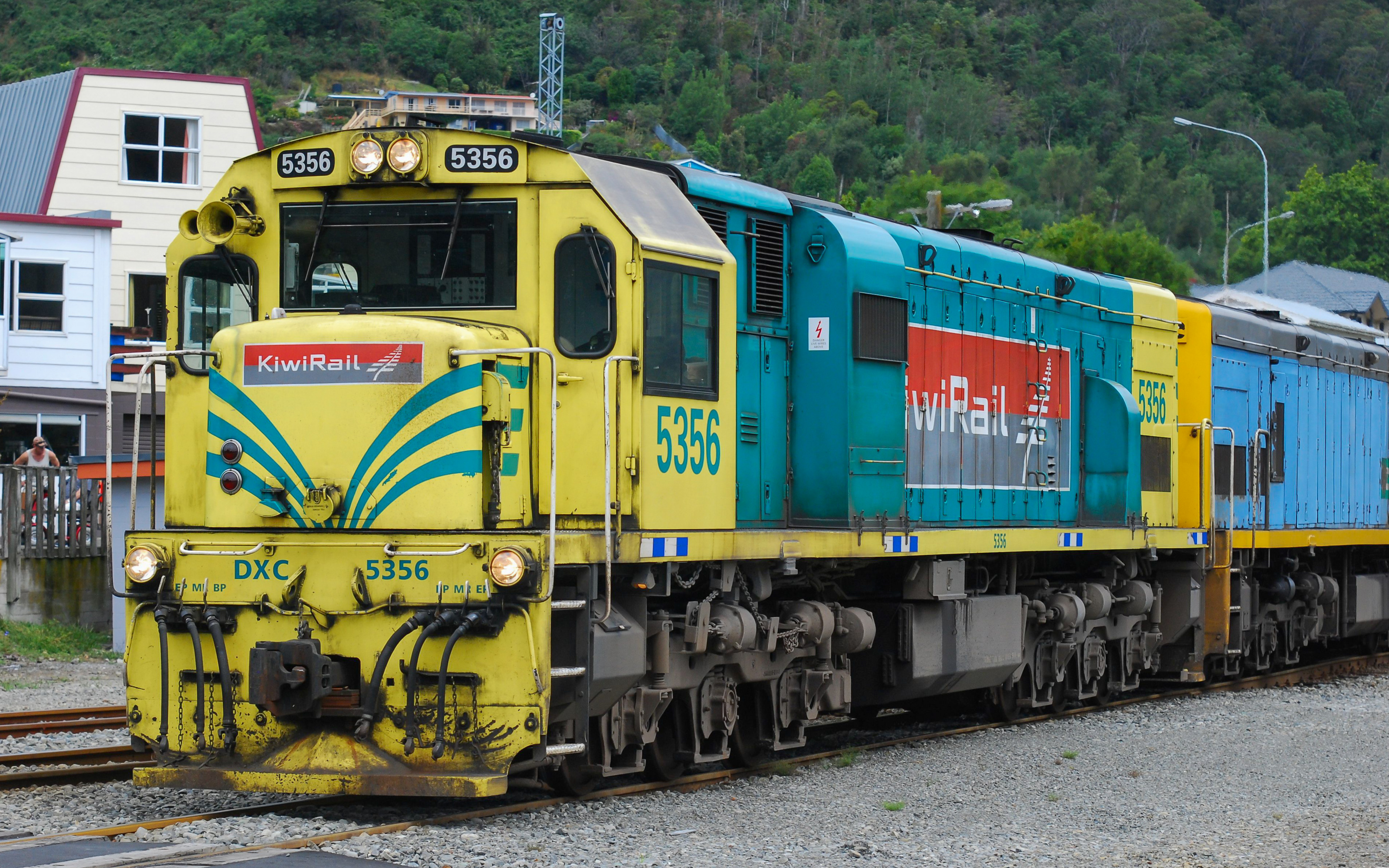
DXC 5356 in Picton, along with DX 5483 (in the Cato Blue livery). The Toll logo has been "patched" over with a KiwiRail logo.

Corn-Cob was an informal term, promoted by the editors of NZ Railfan magazine, describing a New Zealand railway locomotive livery (resulting from the combination of green and yellow in the colour scheme) found in common usage amongst the railfan community. The livery was introduced on 5 May 2004 when Toll Rail took over the rail system from Tranz Rail and replaced the Bumble-Bee livery. The livery was replaced by the KiwiRail Phase One livery in July 2008. DX 5379 was the first locomotive to wear the livery. The livery represents the colours of Toll Rail and the colours of Australia. When KiwiRail took over the rail system from Toll, the Toll logos on the locomotives were covered or "patched" with the KiwiRail logo.

As of January 2020, one DHs, two DSCs, two DSJs and one TR still operate in this livery.

== Variations ==
Since the introduction of the livery in May 2004, there has only been one variation:

- DXB 5143 received the livery in June 2008, had been repainted with a deeper yellow on the front of the cab, running boards and at each end of the loco, however the cab-sides were repainted in lighter shade of yellow. It also lacked the green stripes and Toll Rail insignia on the nose. This was only short-lived and the loco never operated in the livery.
- Although not an official variation, DBR 1295 wore the livery without the Toll Rail branding on the short-hood.

== Lists of locomotives that wore/wear the Corn-Cob livery ==
DAR class:

- 517 - now scrapped

DBR class:

- 1295 - now preserved by the Glenbrook Vintage Railway

DC class:

- 4093 - repainted in the MAXX blue livery and now scrapped
- 4605 - now in the KiwiRail Bold livery
- 4801 - now in the KiwiRail Bold livery
- 4818 - repainted in the KiwiRail Bold livery and now preserved by the Glenbrook Vintage Railway
- 4830 - now scrapped

DFB class:

- 7023 - now in the KiwiRail Bold livery
- 7186 - now in the KiwiRail Bold livery
- 7307 - now in the KiwiRail Bold livery
- 7348 - now in the KiwiRail Bold livery

DH class:

- 2839
- 2851 - now in the KiwiRail Bold livery

DQ class:

- 6324 - shipped overseas
- 6347 - shipped overseas

DSC class:

- 2216 - now scrapped
- 2379 - now in the KiwiRail livery
- 2462
- 2720

DSG class:

- 3046 - now in the KiwiRail livery

DSJ class:

- 4004 - now in the KiwiRail livery
- 4032
- 4060

DX class:

- 5074 - now in the KiwiRail Bold livery
- 5114 - now in the KiwiRail Bold livery
- 5143 - now in the KiwiFruit livery
- 5172 - now in the KiwiRail Bold livery
- 5206 - now in the KiwiRail Bold livery
- 5212 - repainted in the KiwiRail Bold livery and is now under overhaul at Hutt Workshops
- 5241 - now in the KiwiRail Bold livery
- 5258 - now in the KiwiRail Bold livery
- 5264 - now in the KiwiRail Bold livery
- 5270 - now in the KiwiRail Bold livery
- 5287 - now in the KiwiRail Bold livery
- 5356 - now in the KiwiRail Bold livery
- 5379 - now in the KiwiRail Bold livery
- 5385 - now in the KiwiRail Bold livery
- 5402 - now in the KiwiRail Bold livery
- 5425 - now in the KiwiRail Bold livery
- 5431 - now in the KiwiRail Bold livery
- 5477 - now in the KiwiRail Bold livery
- 5500 - repainted in the KiwiRail Bold livery and is now stored as a chassis
- 8007 - now in the KiwiRail Bold livery
- 8022 - now in the KiwiRail Bold livery

TR class:

- 845
- 897 - now in the KiwiRail livery
- 914 - now in the KiwiRail livery

== Gallery ==
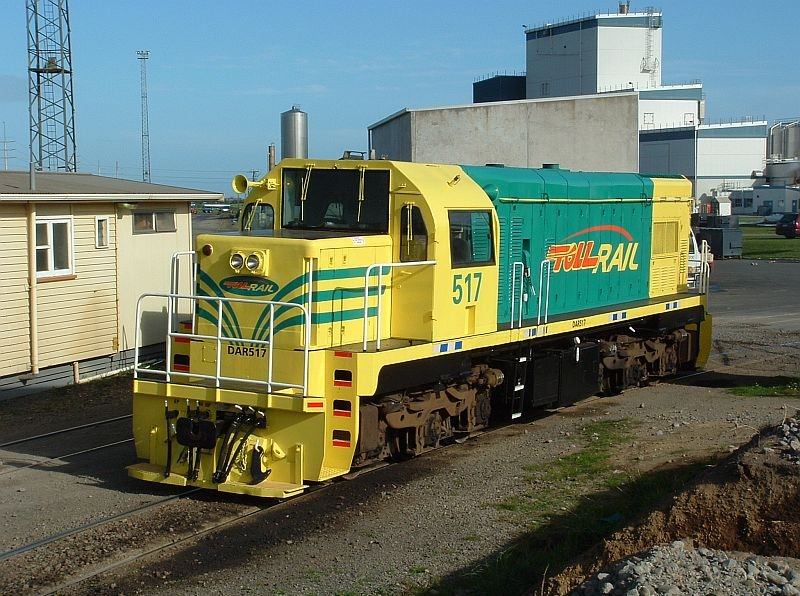
DAR 517 in Whareroa, near Hāwera.

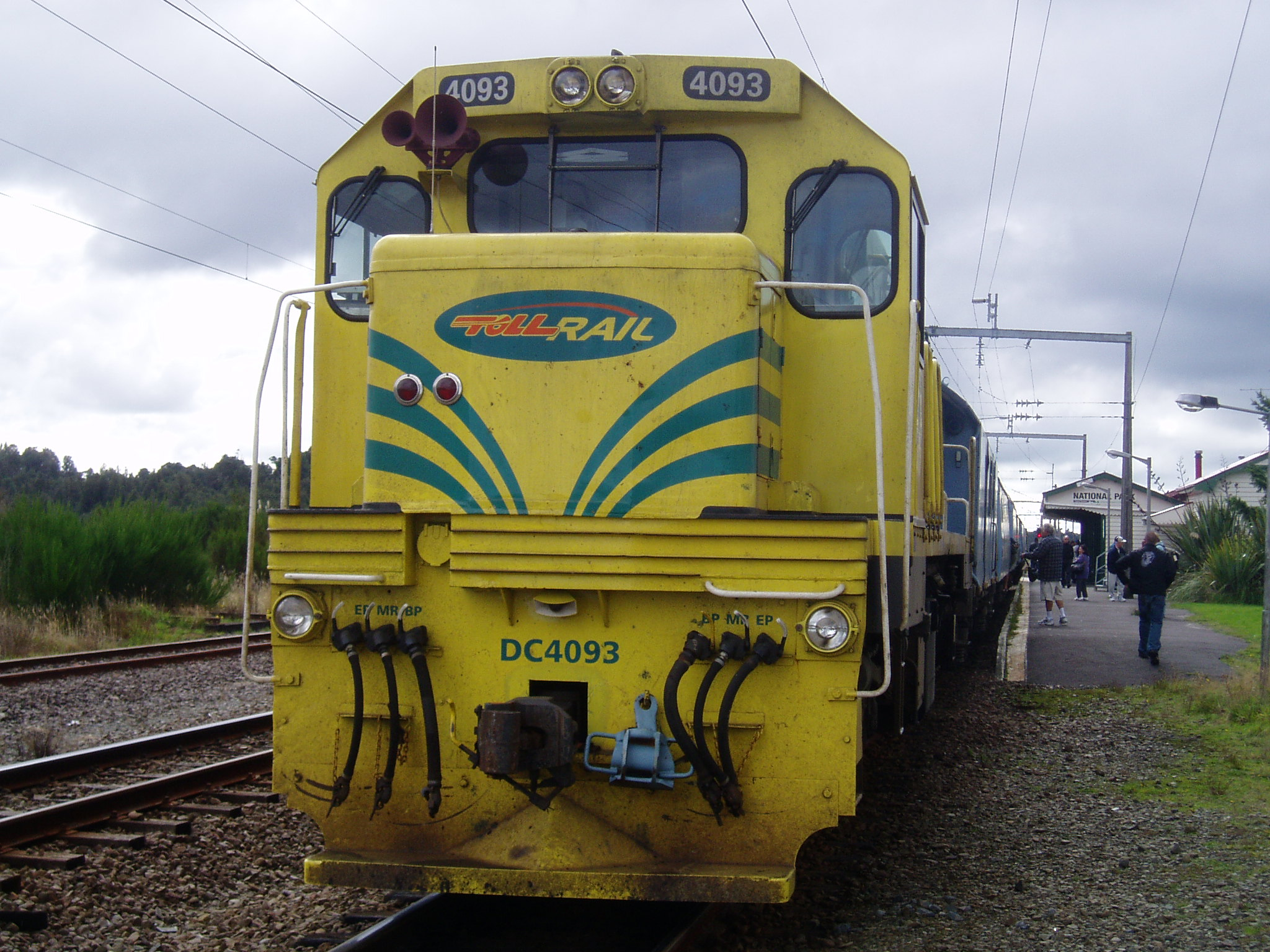
DC 4093 at National Park with the Overlander.

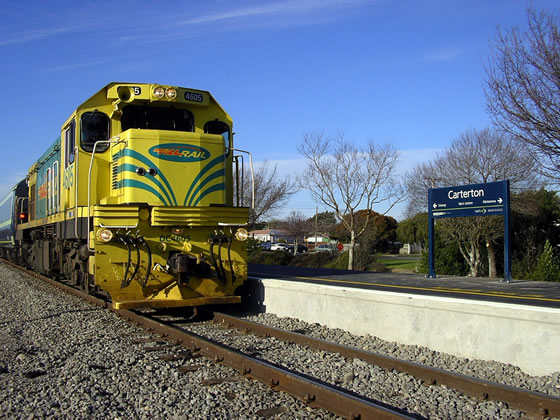
DCP 4605 at the Carterton railway station with Wairarapa Connection.

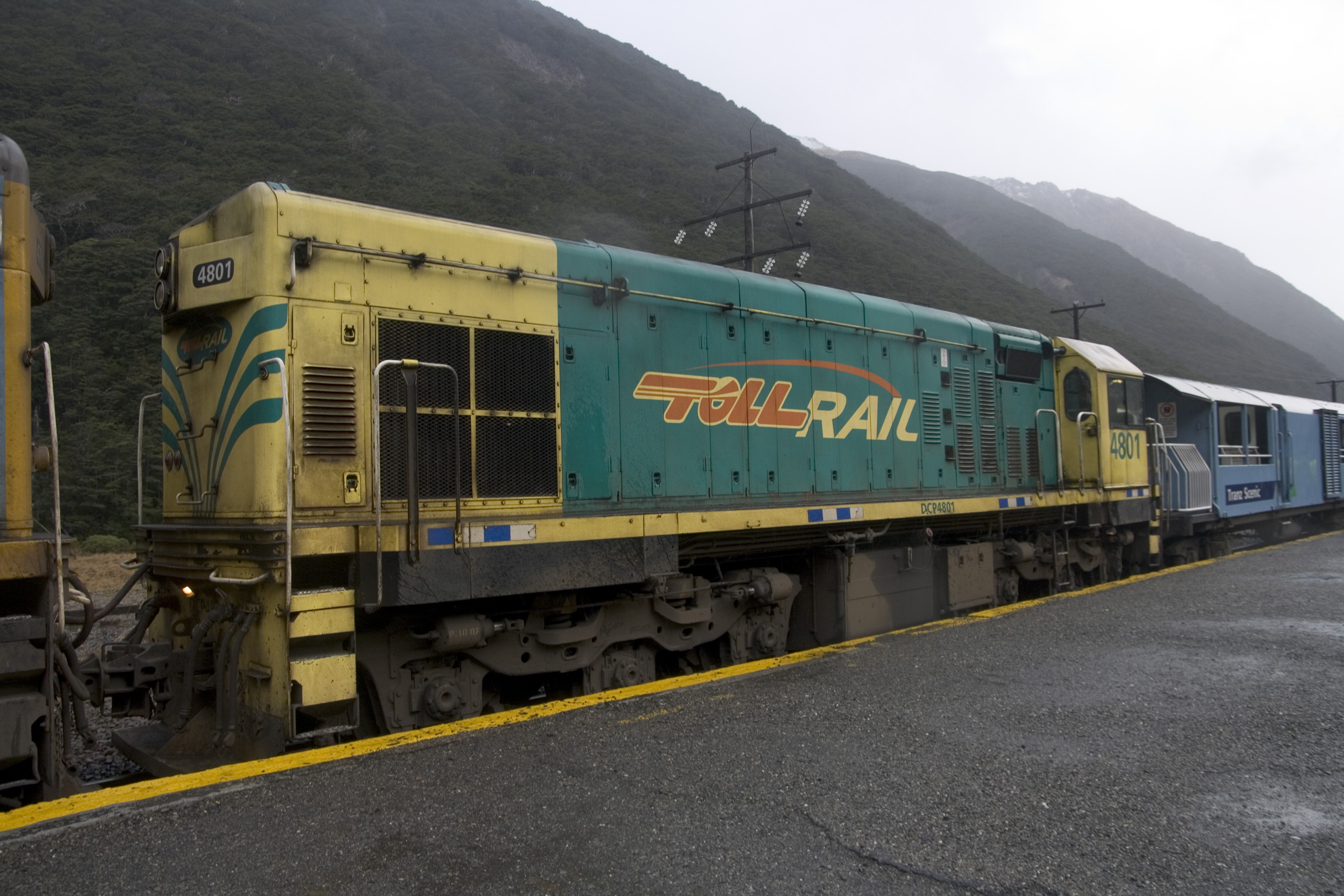
DCP 4801 in Arthur's Pass with the TranzAlpine.

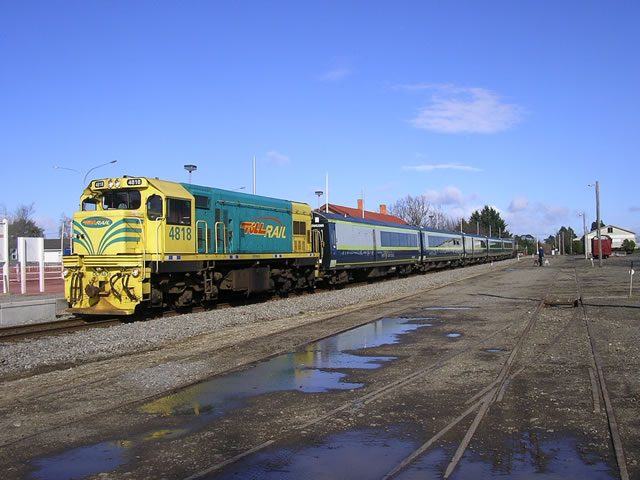
DCP 4818 at the Carterton Railway Station with Waiararapa Connection.

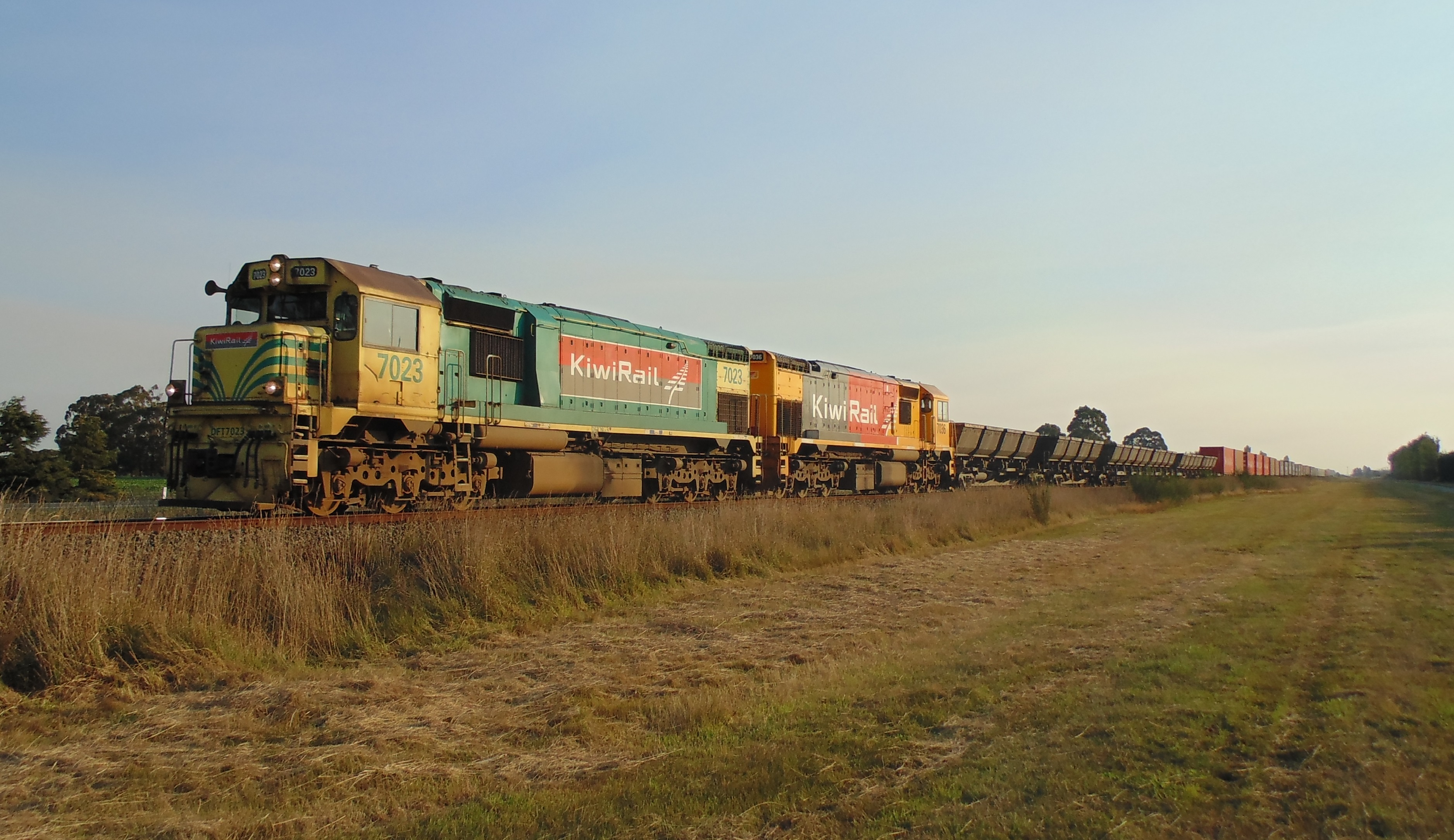
DFTs 7023 and 7036 (in the KiwiRail Phase 2 livery) with a freight train approaching Tinwald.

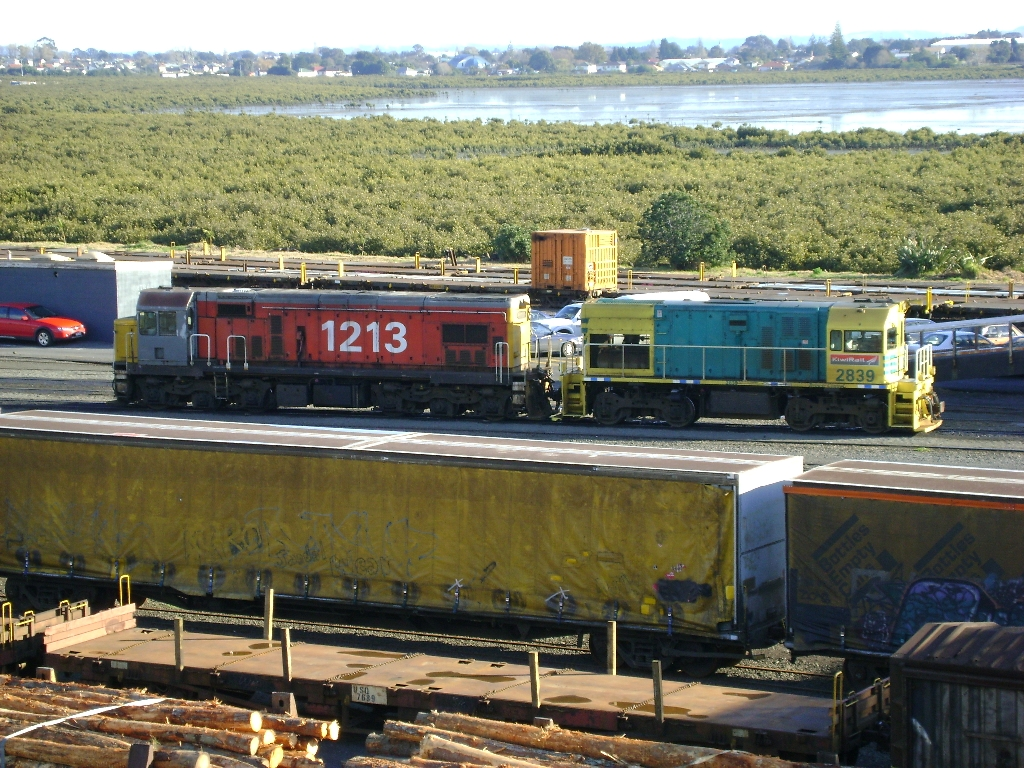
DH 2839 and DBR 1213 (in the International Orange livery) in the Westfield Marshalling Yard.

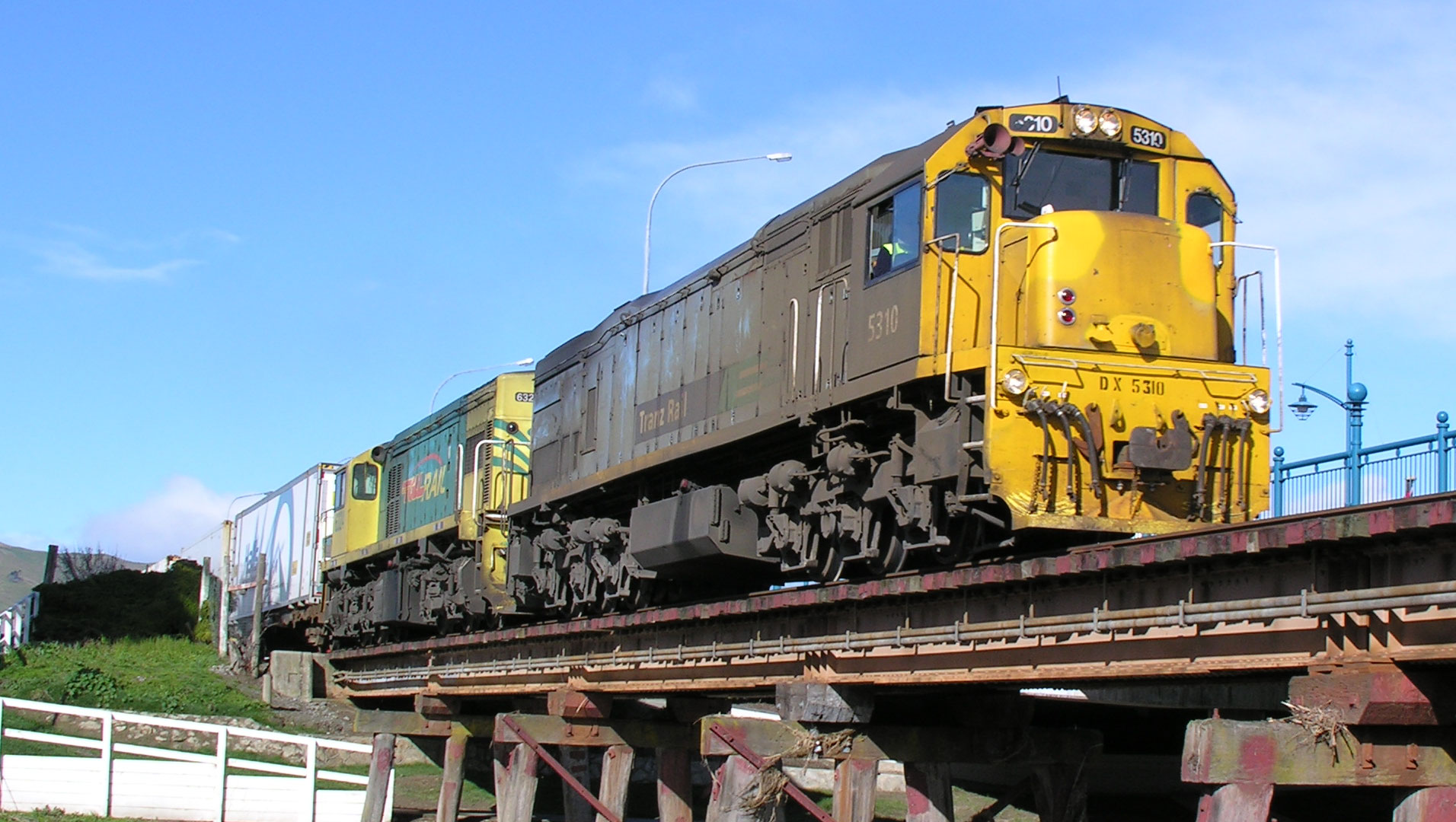
DQ 6324, along with DX 5310 (in the Cato Blue livery), passes over Taylor Bridge in Blenheim.

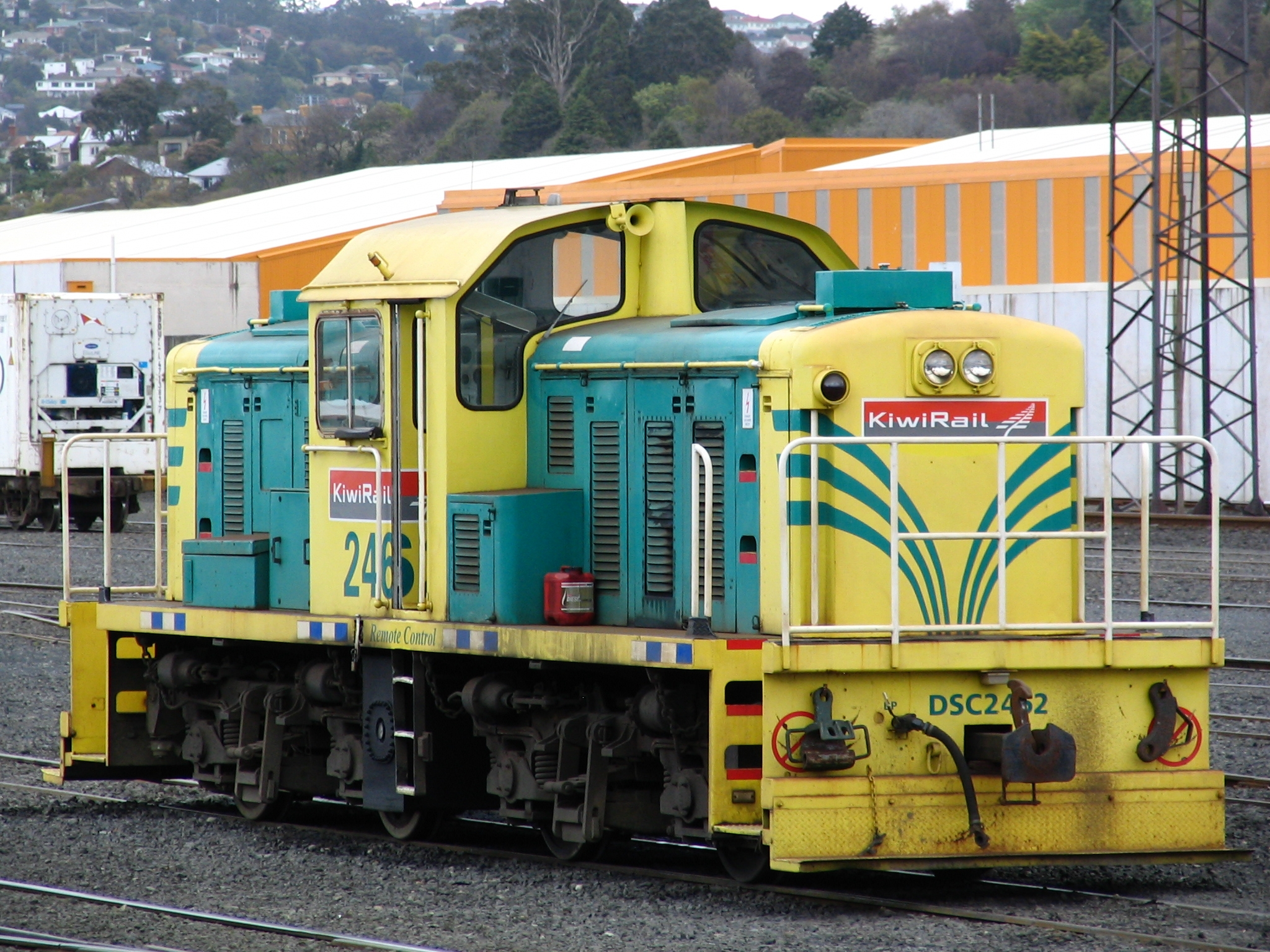
DSC 2462 in Dunedin.

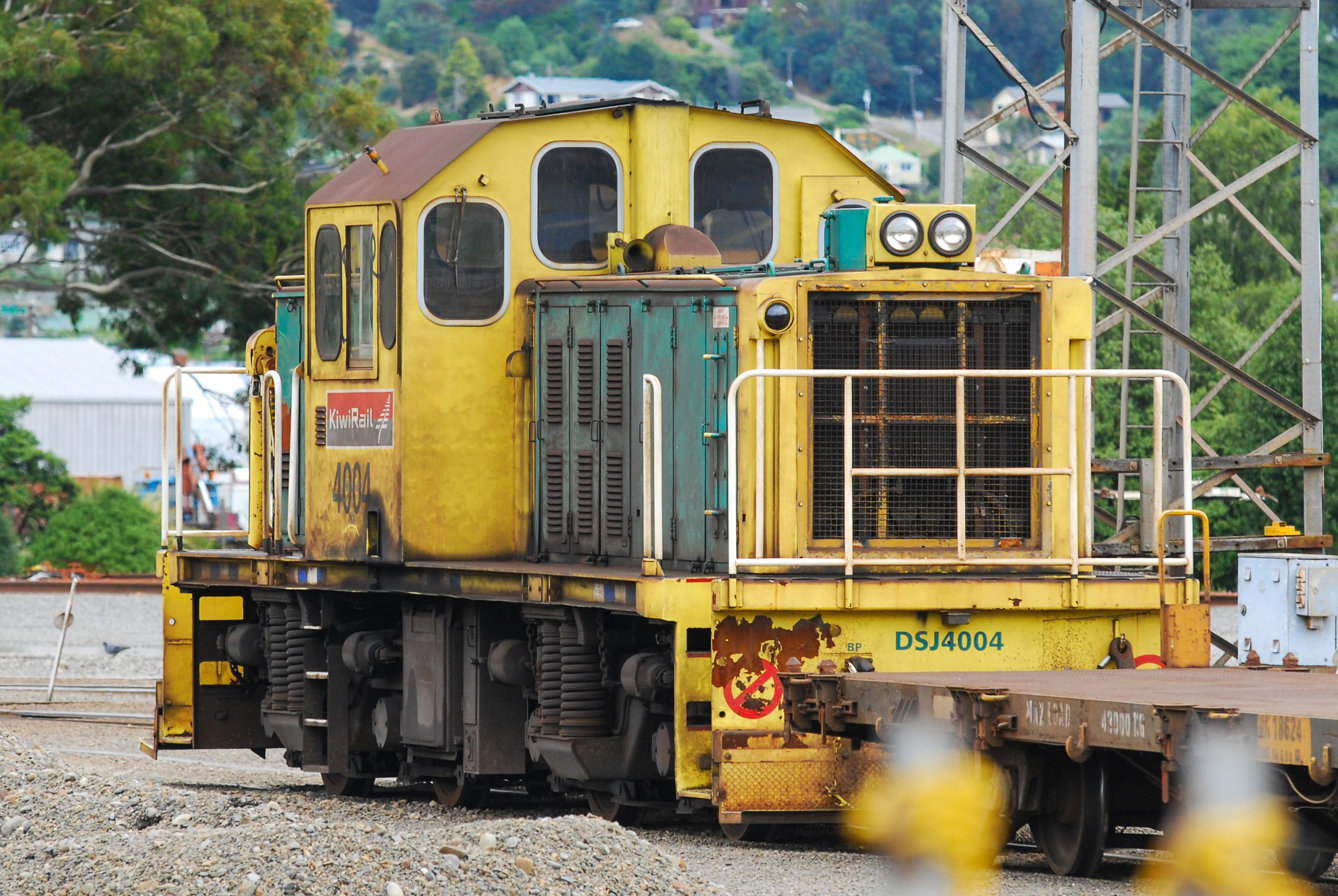
DSJ 4004 shunting in Picton.

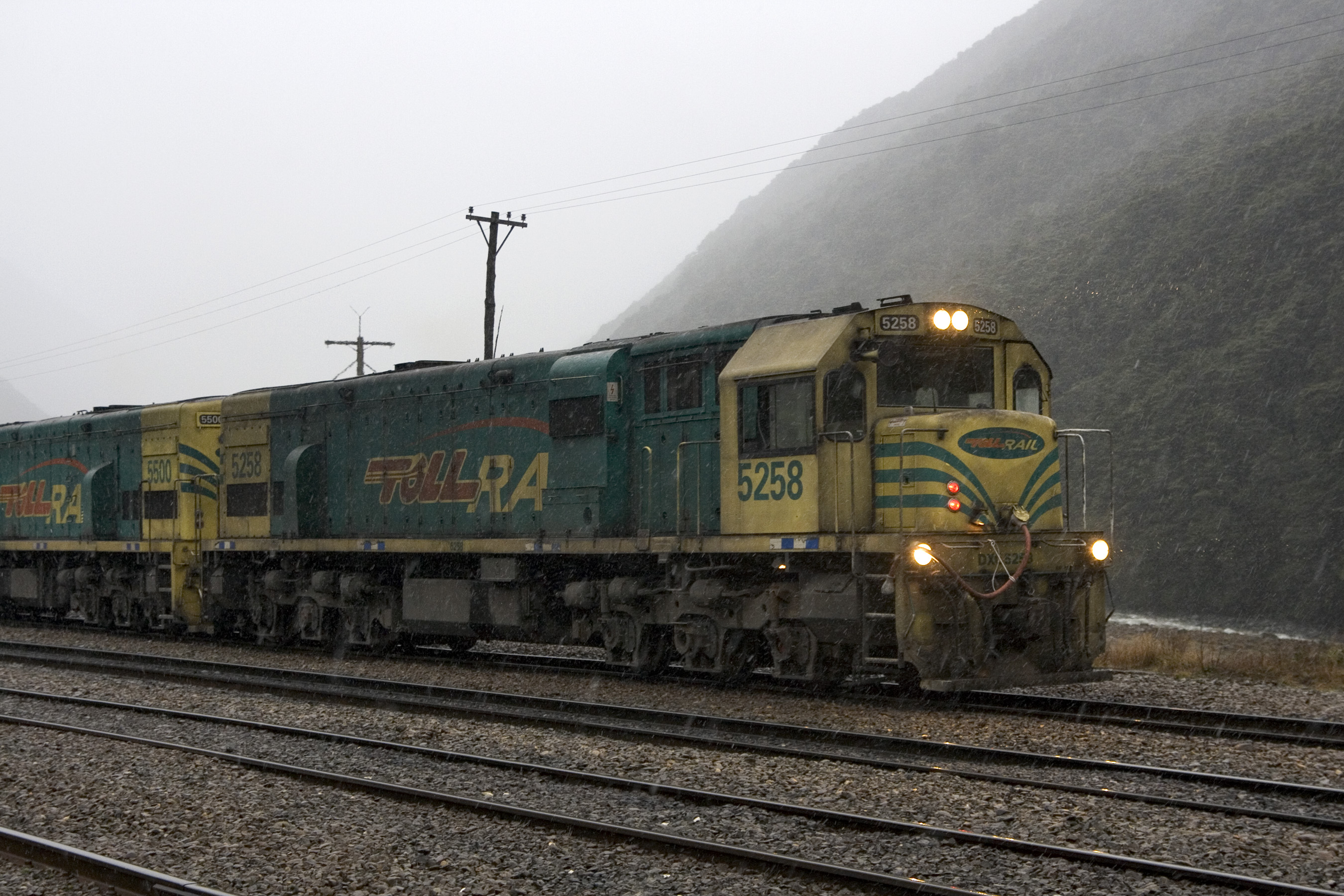
DXC 5258 in Arthur's Pass.

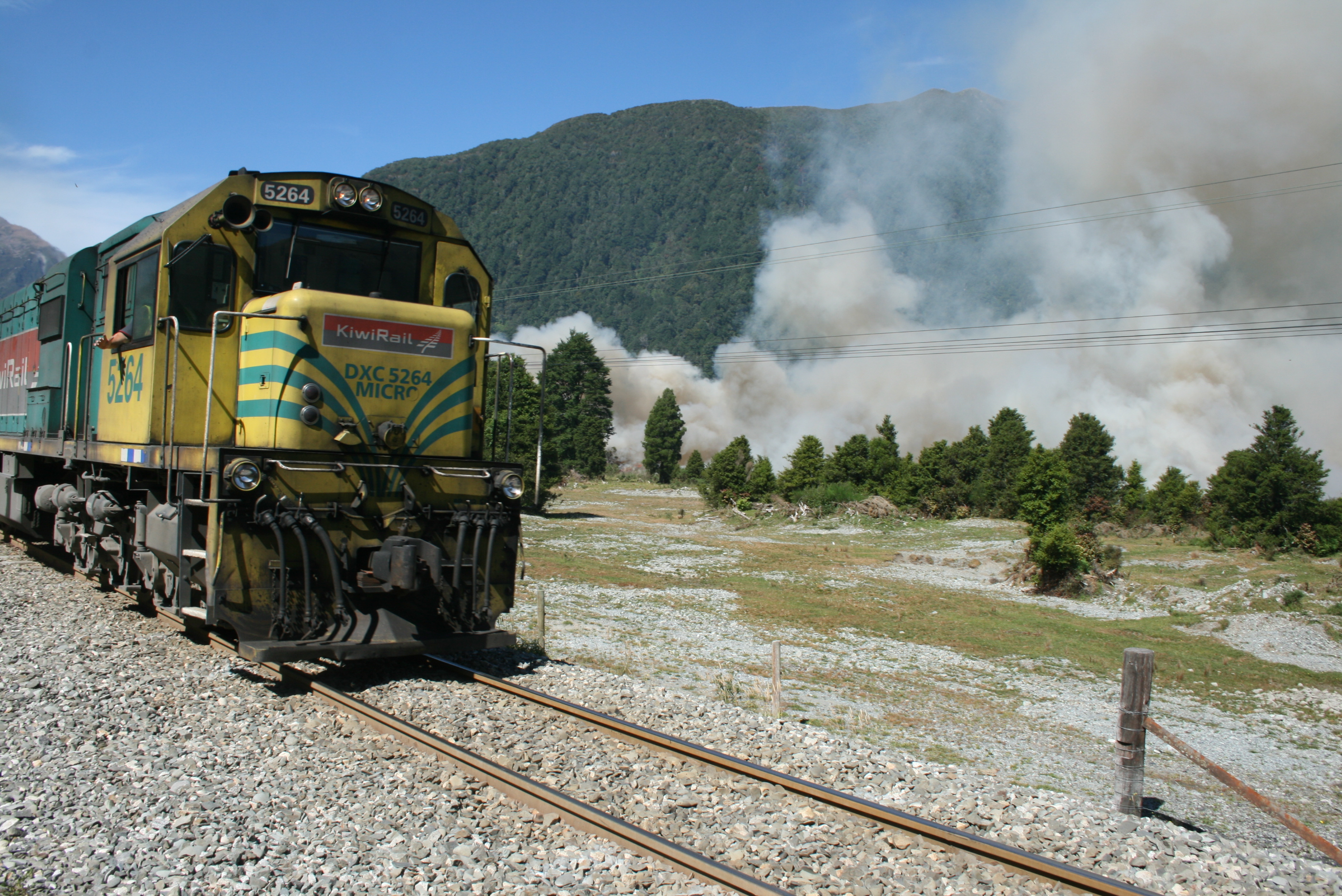
DXC 5264 passing a controlled burn-off.

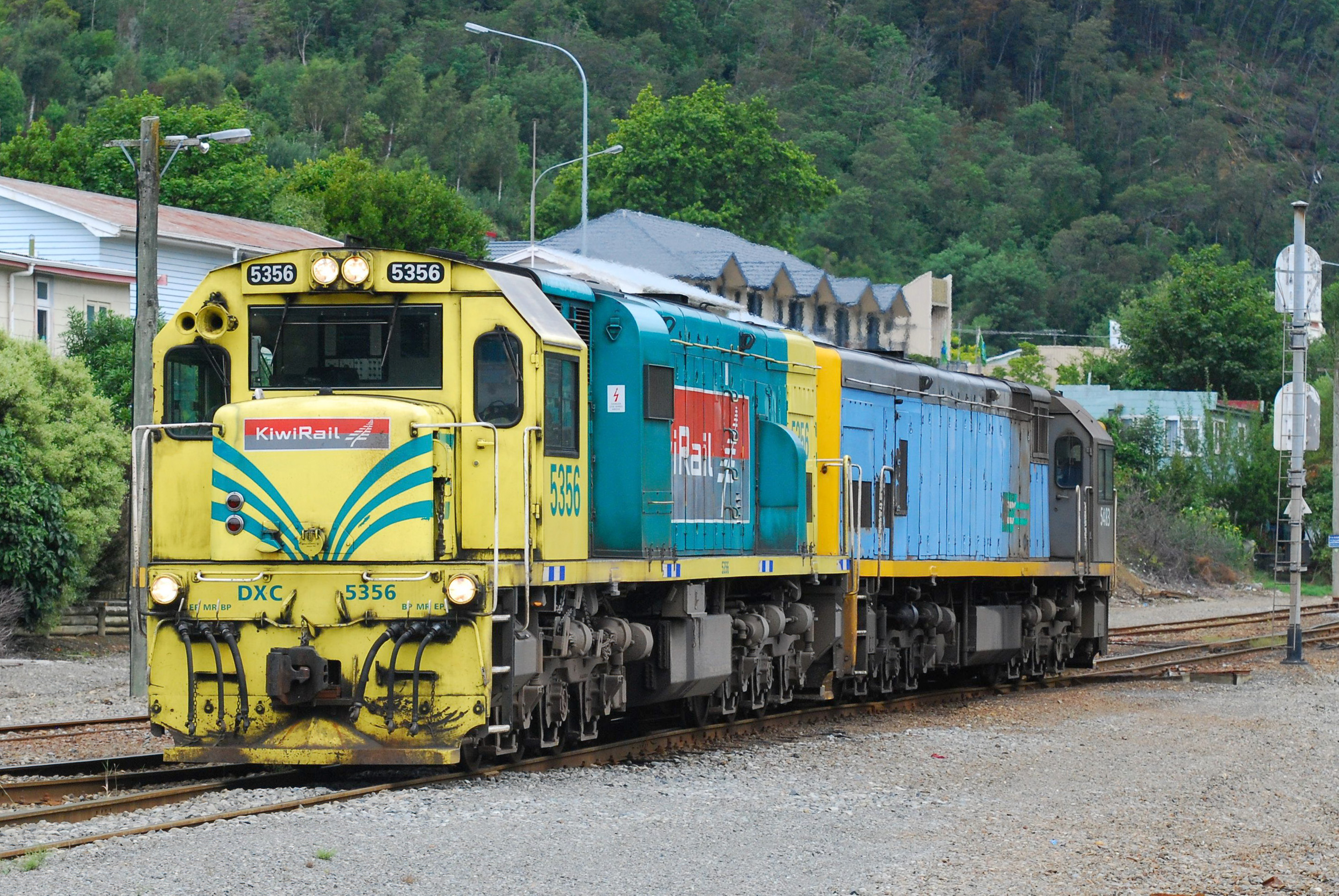
DXC 5356 and DX 5483 (in the Cato Blue livery) in Picton.

DXR 8007 with a freight train south of Morrinsville.
