= Bumble-Bee (livery) =

Livery used on New Zealand railway locomotives

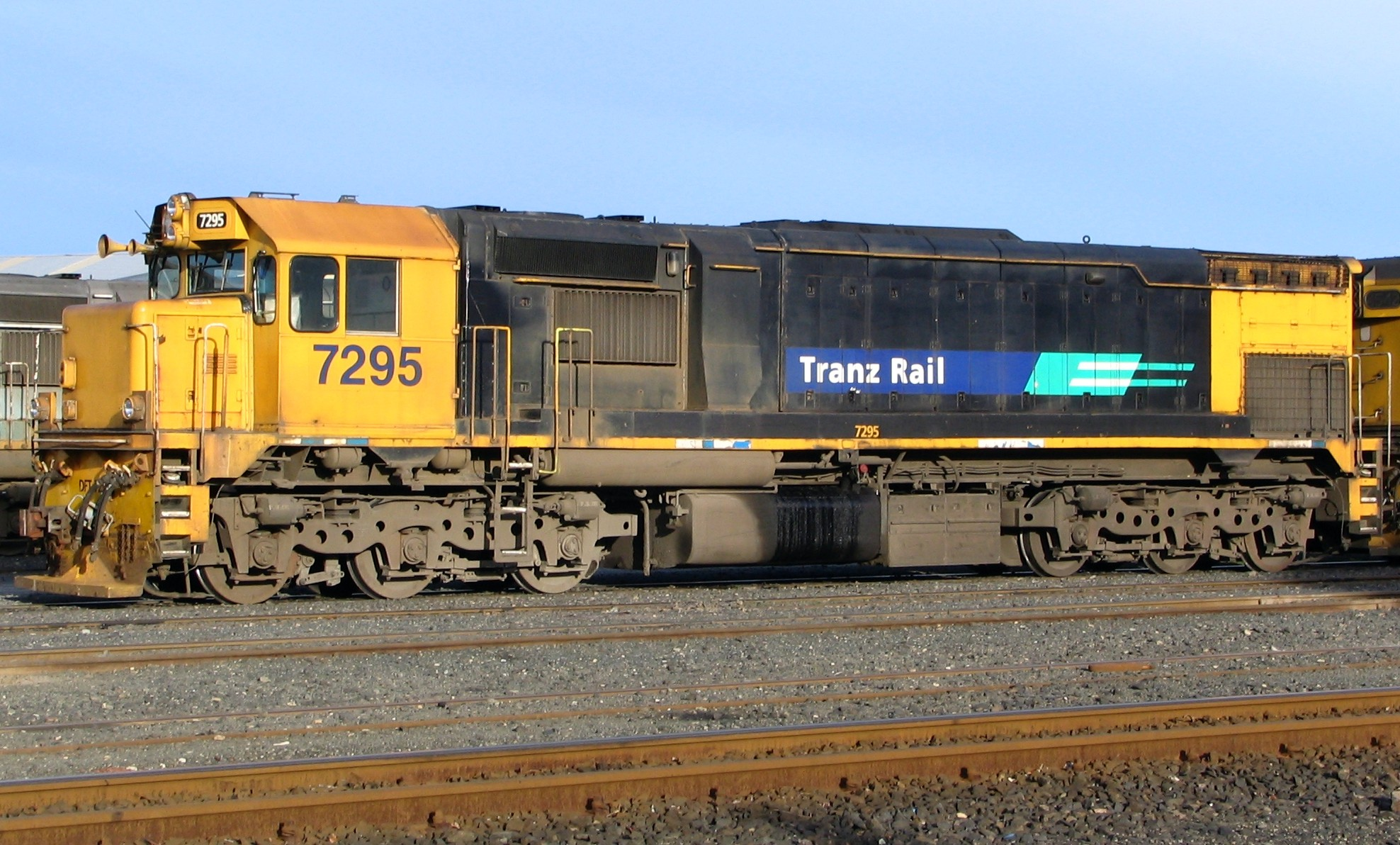
DFT 7295 in Dunedin while wearing the Tranz Rail winged logo.

Bumble-Bee was an informal term, promoted by the editors of NZ Railfan magazine, describing a New Zealand railway locomotive livery (resulting from the combination of black and yellow in the colour scheme) found in common usage amongst the railfan community.

The livery, first introduced on 31 May 2001 to promote level crossing safety to replace the Cato Blue livery and was initially trialed on Tranz Rail locomotive DC4323, and over time was applied to numerous other locomotive classes up until 5 May 2004, when Toll NZ took over Tranz Rail, and introduced the Corn-Cob livery.

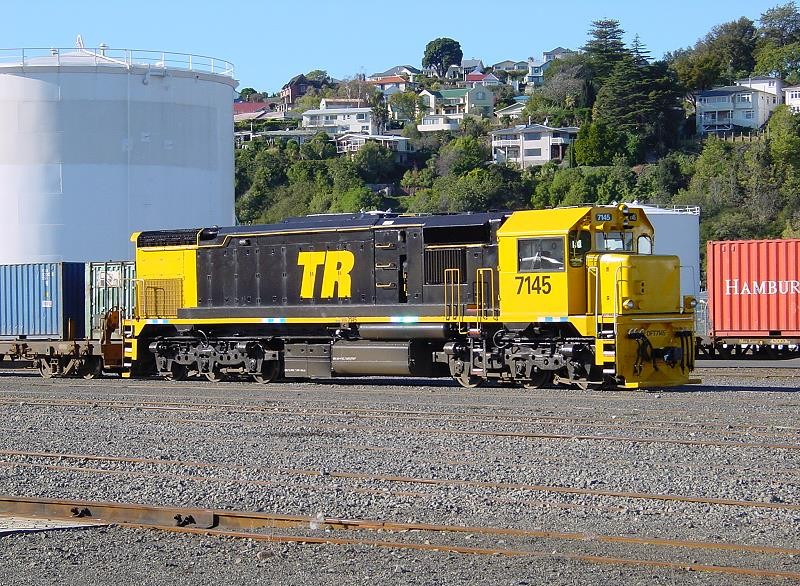
DFT7145 in Napier while wearing the "TR" slopping blocks.

The first four locomotives that were painted in the livery, including DC4323 and DFT7160, received the livery with the Tranz Rail "winged" logo. DC4185, DX5166 and EF30071 never received branding when they were repainted in the livery. DC4185 did not receive branding either when it was repainted, but the sloping block letters were later applied to the loco.

== Variations ==
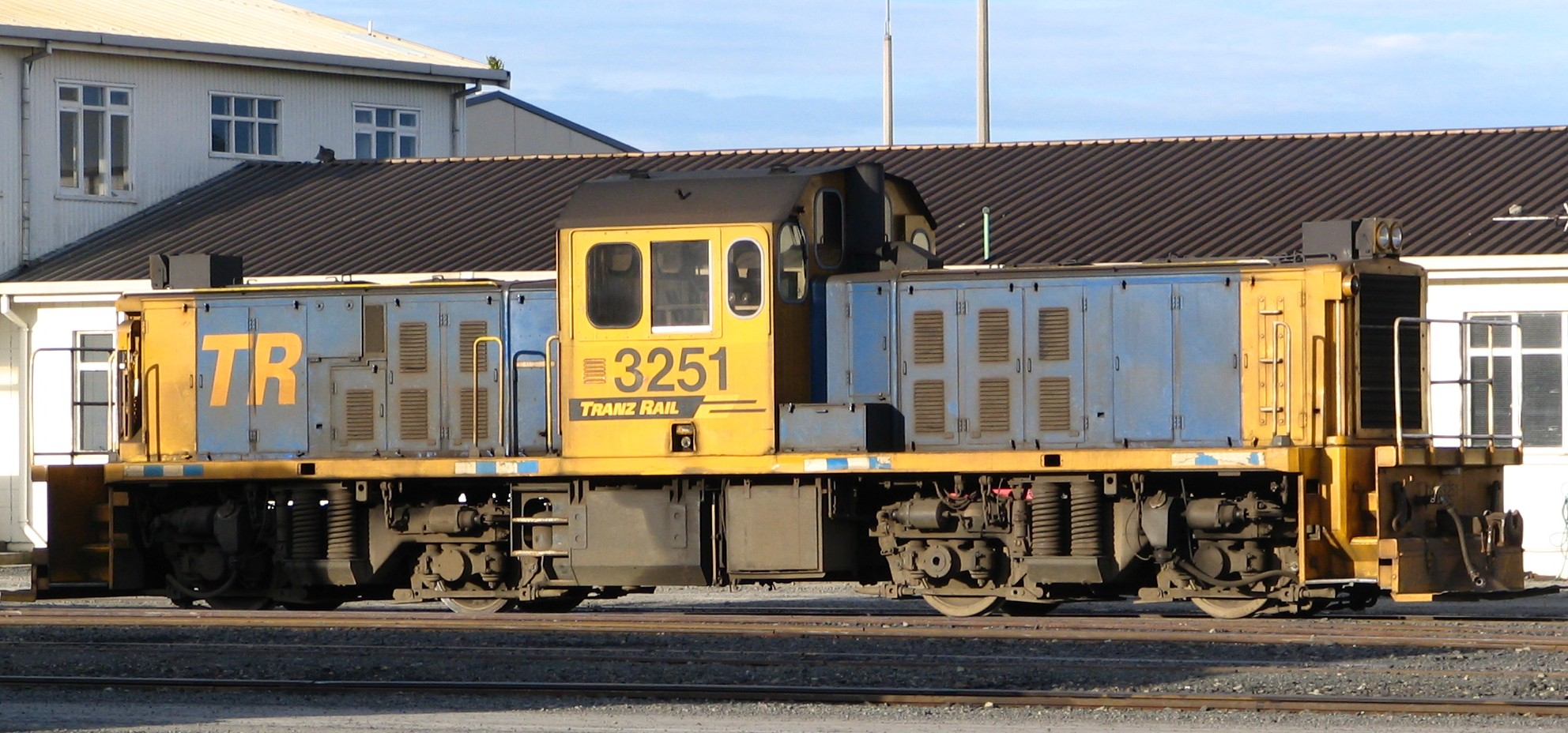
DSG3251 in Dunedin.

A few locomotives had been repainted in variations of this livery:

- DSC2678 was repainted in the livery, but with a red stripe running down the sides of its hoods, which are the colours of Canterbury.
- DSG3251 was repainted in the Otago colours of blue and yellow instead of black and yellow, with "TR" block letters on the logo hood, and a bumble-bee version of the Tranz Rail winged logo on the cab.
- TR874 was repainted in this livery, but in reverse with a black cab and yellow hoods, with a bumble-bee version of the Tranz Rail winged logo also painted on the long hood. This variation was called by many rail enthusiasts as the "Wasp" livery.
- Although not an official variation, DC4421 and DC4853 have received KiwiRail stickers on the front of the short-hood, and on the back of the long-hood.

== Locomotives that wore/wear the Bumble Bee livery ==
DC class:

- 4012 - now in the KiwiRail Bold livery
- 4058 - now in the KiwiRail Bold livery
- 4185 - now stored at Hutt Workshops
- 4300 - now scrapped
- 4317 - now scrapped
- 4323 - now in the KiwiRail Bold livery
- 4398 - now scrapped
- 4421 - now stored at Hutt Workshops, Lower Hutt
- 4438 - now stored at Hillside Workshops
- 4450 - repainted in the KiwiRail Bold livery and now scrapped
- 4473 - now stored at Hillside Workshops
- 4565 - now scrapped
- 4726 - now in the KiwiRail Bold livery
- 4847 - now stored in Middleton Yard, Christchurch
- 4853

DF class:

- 7008 - now in the KiwiFruit livery
- 7049 - now in the KiwiRail Bold livery
- 7077 - now in the KiwiRail Bold livery
- 7145 - repainted in the KiwiRail Bold livery and is now under overhaul
- 7158 - now in the KiwiRail Bold livery
- 7160 - now in the KiwiRail Bold livery
- 7200 - now in the KiwiRail Bold livery
- 7226 - now in the KiwiRail Bold livery
- 7282 - now in the KiwiRail Bold livery
- 7295 - now in the KiwiRail Bold livery

DH class:

- 2822 - now in the KiwiRail Bold livery

DSC class:

- 2419 - now in the KiwiRail livery
- 2678
- 2746 - now in the KiwiRail livery

DSG class:

- 3020 - repainted in the KiwiRail livery and is now under overhaul
- 3114 - now in the KiwiRail livery
- 3236 - now in the KiwiRail livery
- 3251 - now in the KiwiRail livery

DSJ class:

- 4017 - now in the KiwiRail livery
- 4045 - now in the KiwiRail livery

DX class:

- 5039 - now in the KiwiFruit livery
- 5166 - now in the KiwiRail Bold livery
- 5195 - now in the KiwiRail Bold livery
- 5229 - now in the KiwiRail Bold livery
- 5327 - now in the KiwiRail Bold livery
- 5402 - now in the KiwiRail Bold livery
- 5419 - now in the KiwiRail Bold livery
- 5425 - now in theKiwiRail Bold livery
- 5500 - repainted in the KiwiRail Bold livery and now stored at Hutt Workshops as a chassis
- 5517 - now in the KiwiRail Bold livery
- 5520 (and as 5045) - now in the KiwiRail Bold livery

EF class:

- 30013
- 30042
- 30071

TR class:

- 724 - now preserved by the Wairarapa Railway Restoration Society
- 874 - now in the KiwiRail livery
- 908 - now in the KiwiRail livery

== Gallery ==
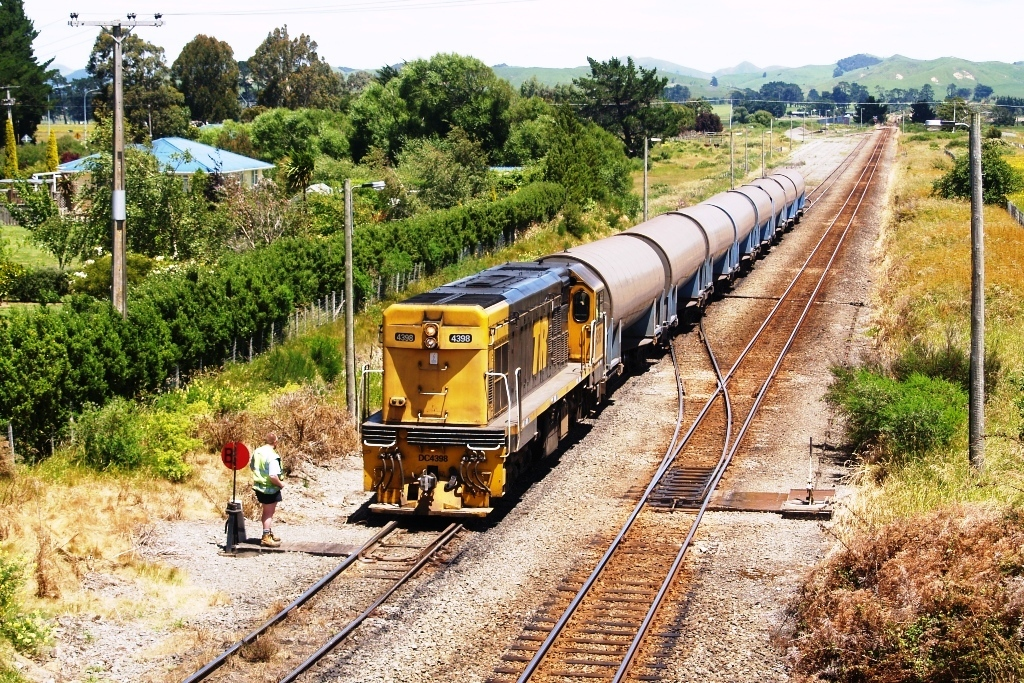
DC 4398 shunting milk wagons at Oringi.

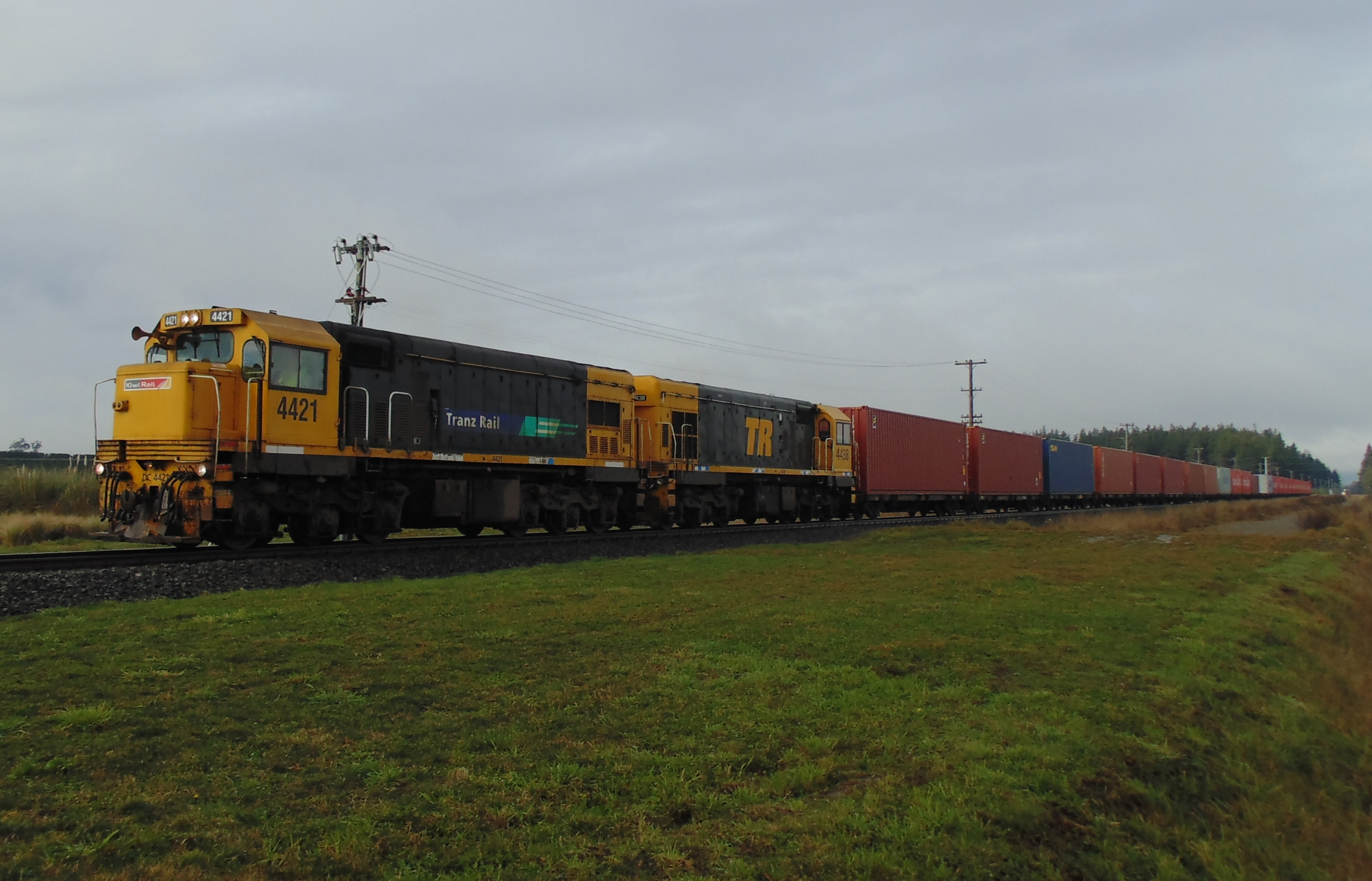
DCs 4421 and 4438 with a shunt near Darfield.

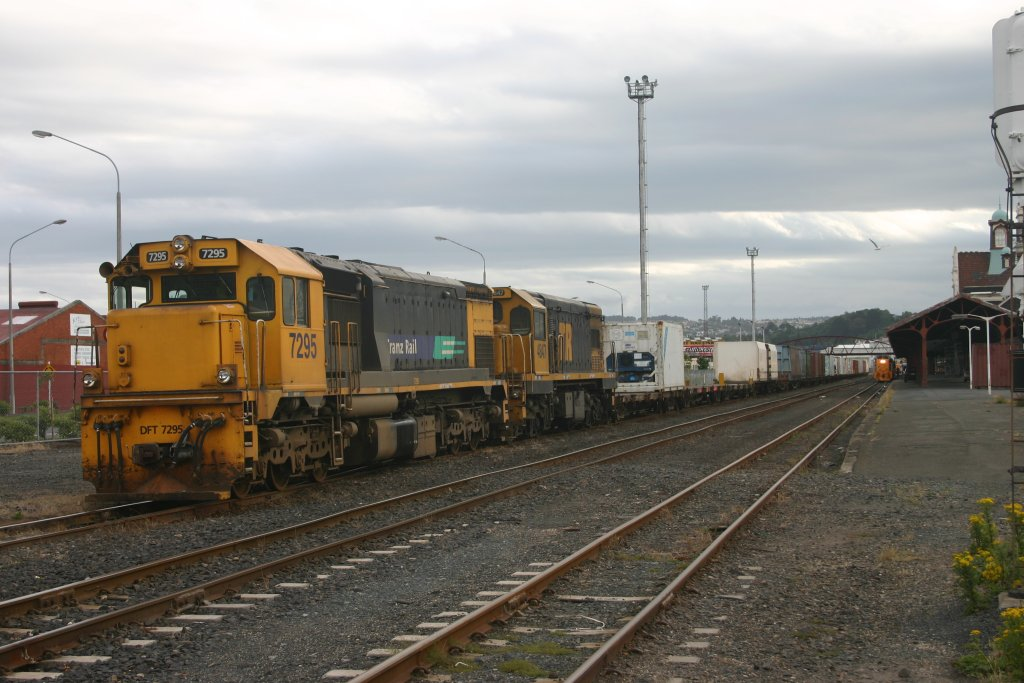
DFT 7295 and DC 4847 departing Dunedin with a freight train.

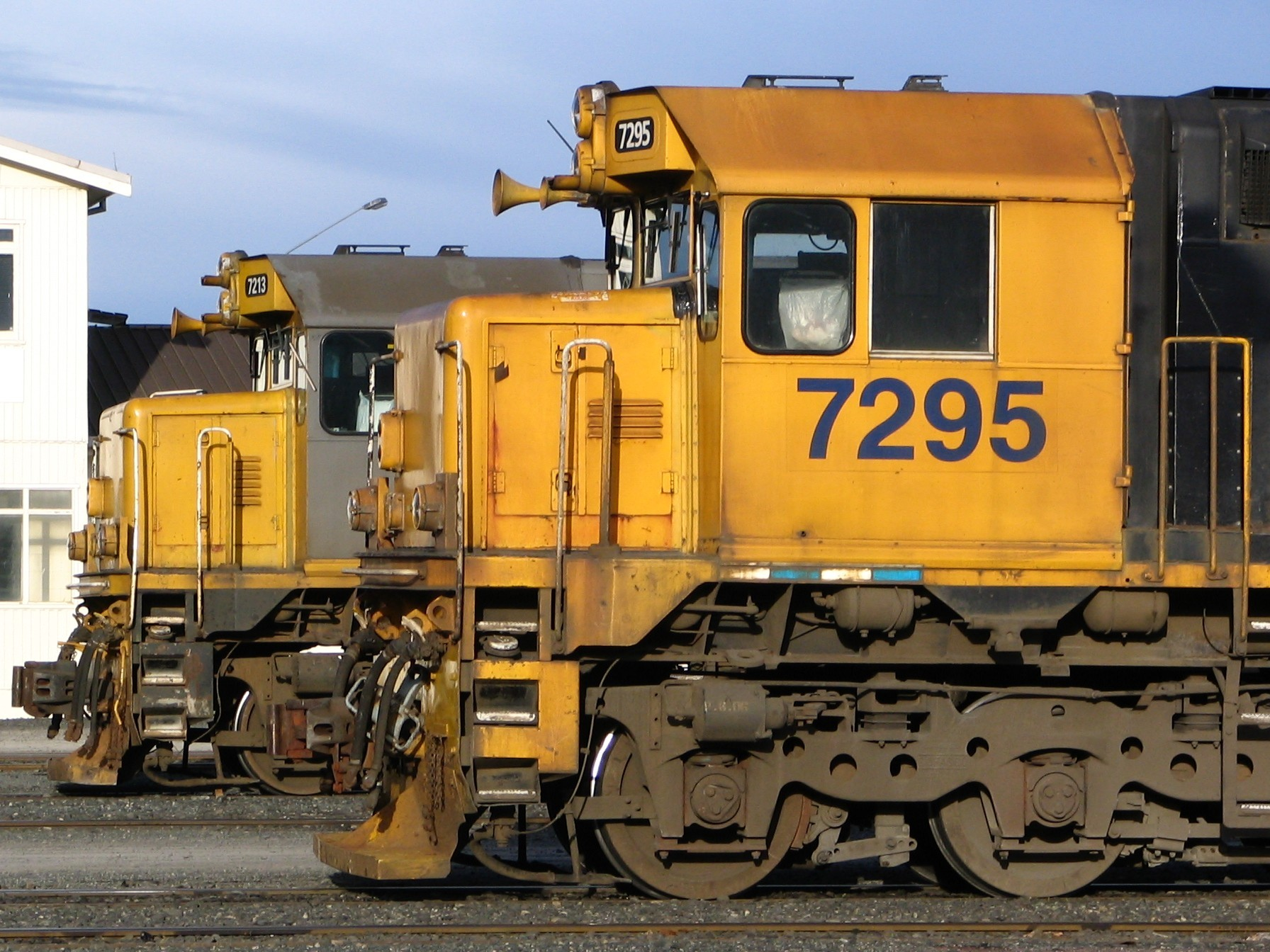
DFT 7295 and DFB 7213 (in the Cato Blue livery) in Dunedin.

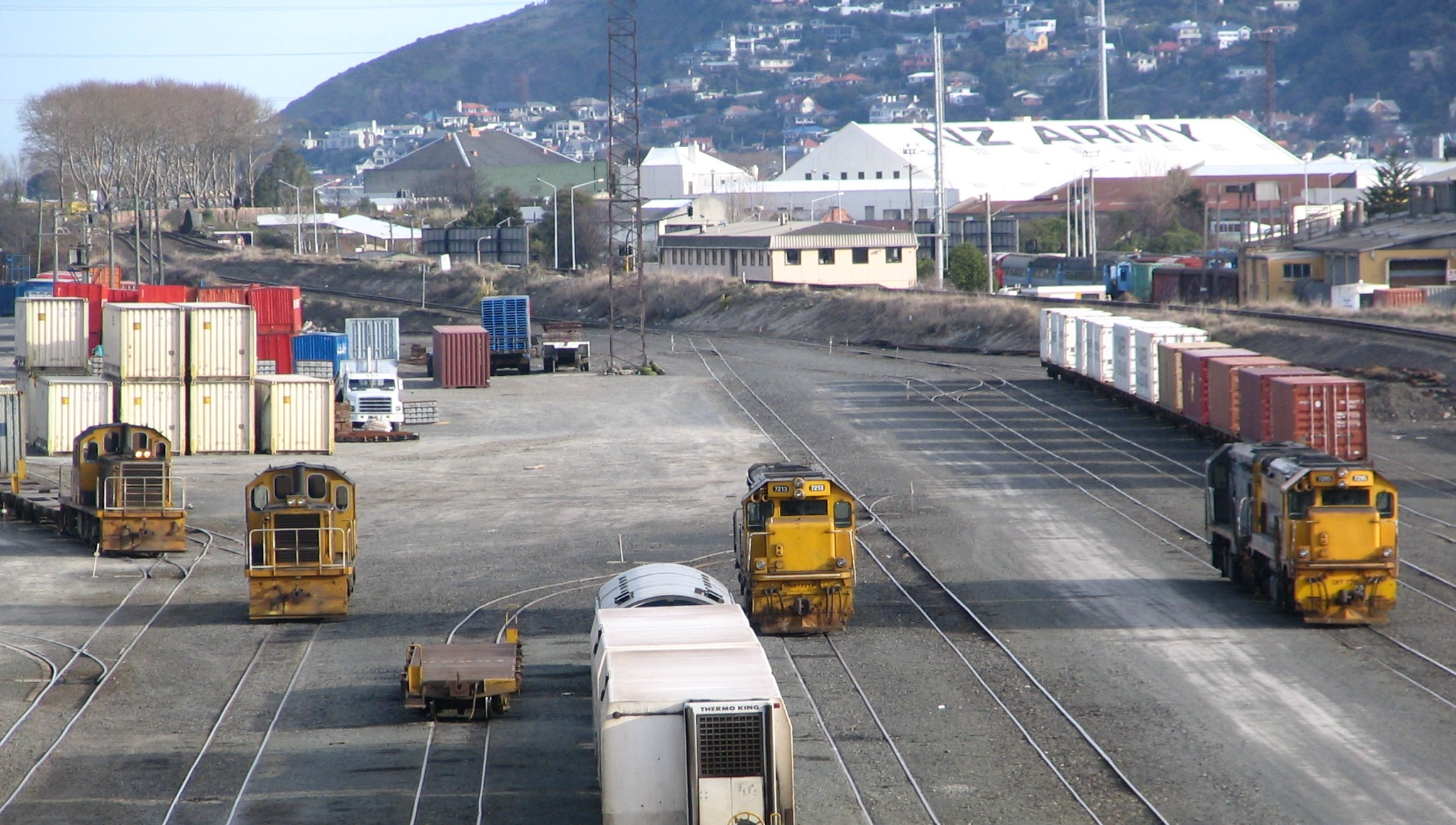
DFT 7295, DSGs 3236 and 3251 (all three in the Bumble-Bee livery), and DFB 7213 and DC 4542 (in the Cato Blue livery) in the Dunedin Rail Yard.

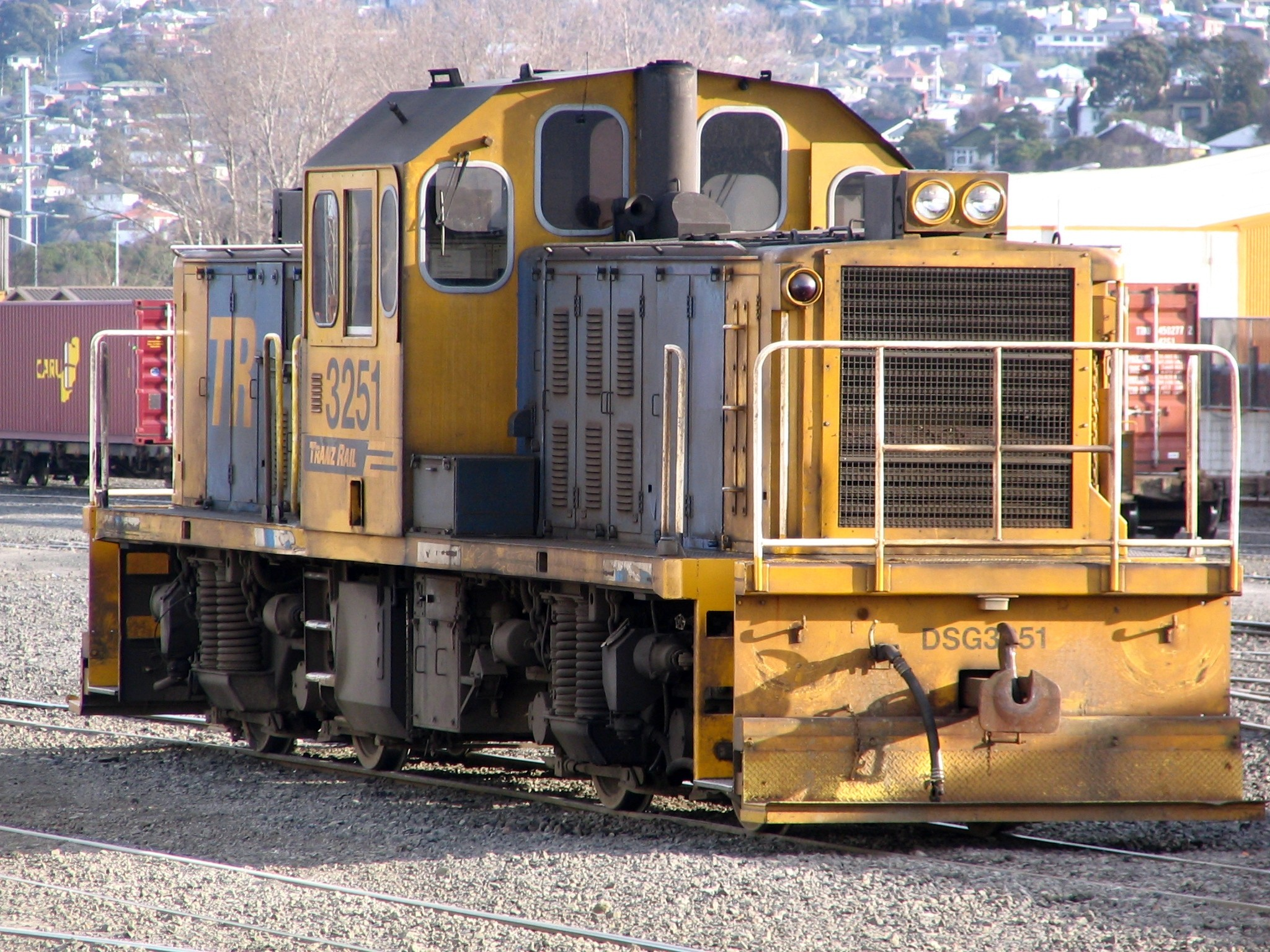
DSG 3251 in Dunedin.

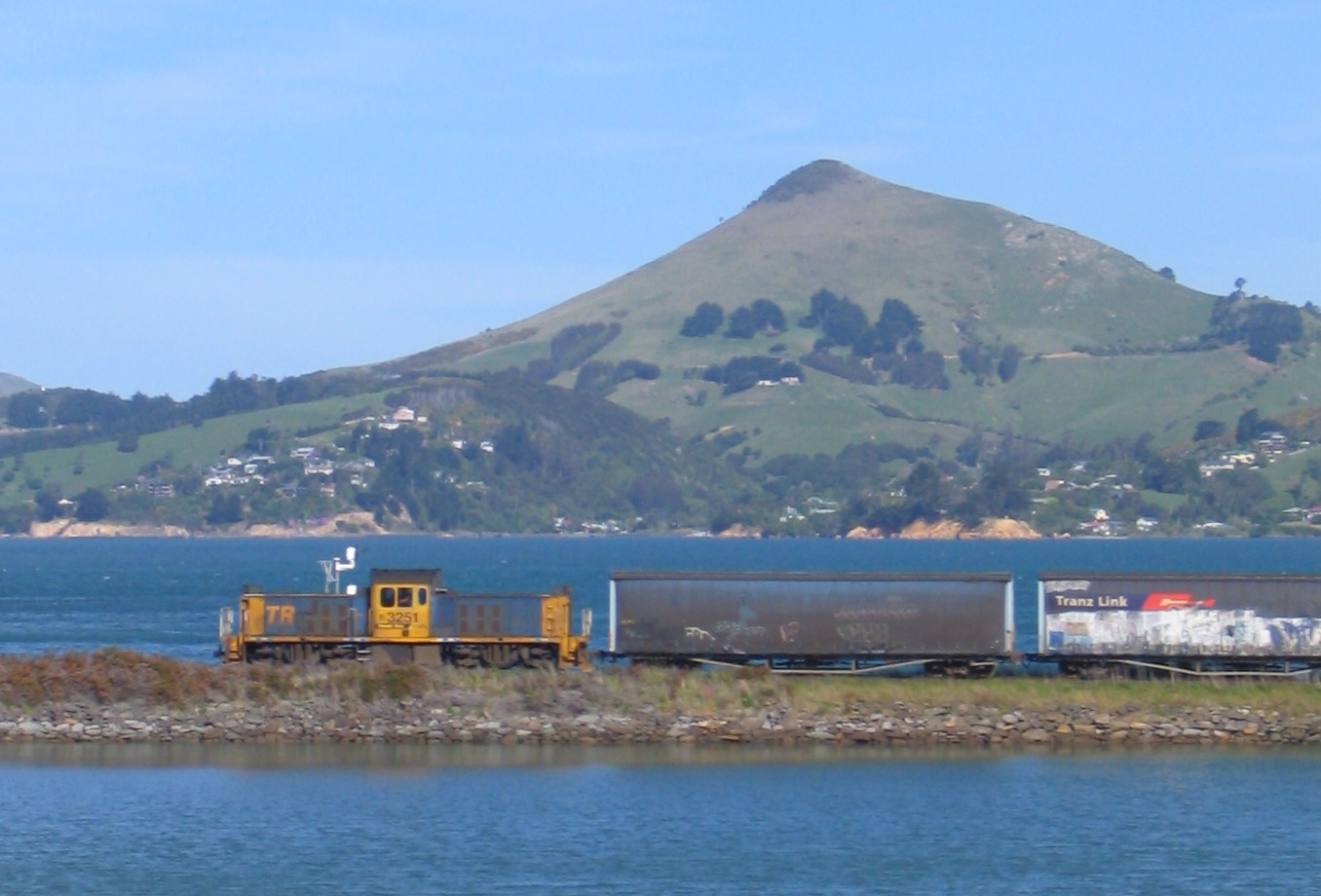
DSG 3251 passing Blanket Bay with a shunt to Port Chalmers.

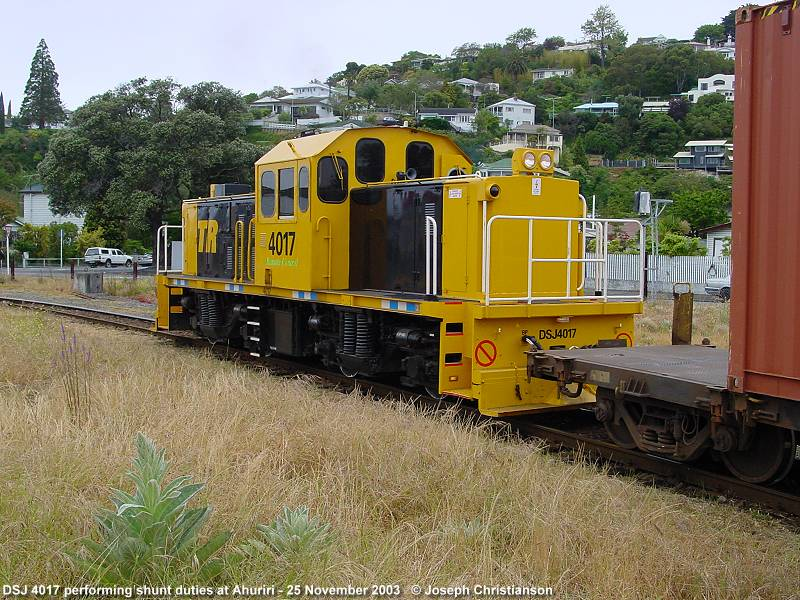
DSJ 4017 shunting in Ahuriri.

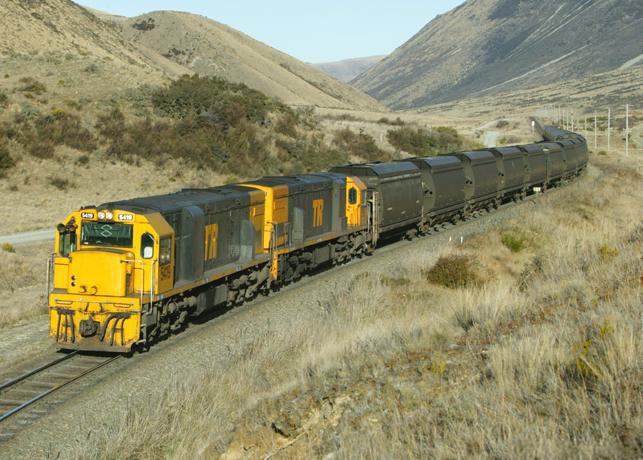
DXs 5419 and 5195 descending Cass Bank with a west-bound coal trains.

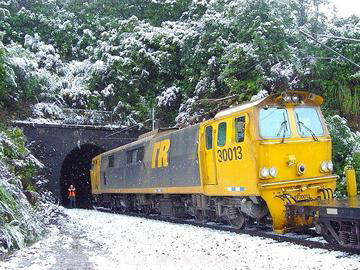
EF 30013 with a freight train on the North Island Main Trunk

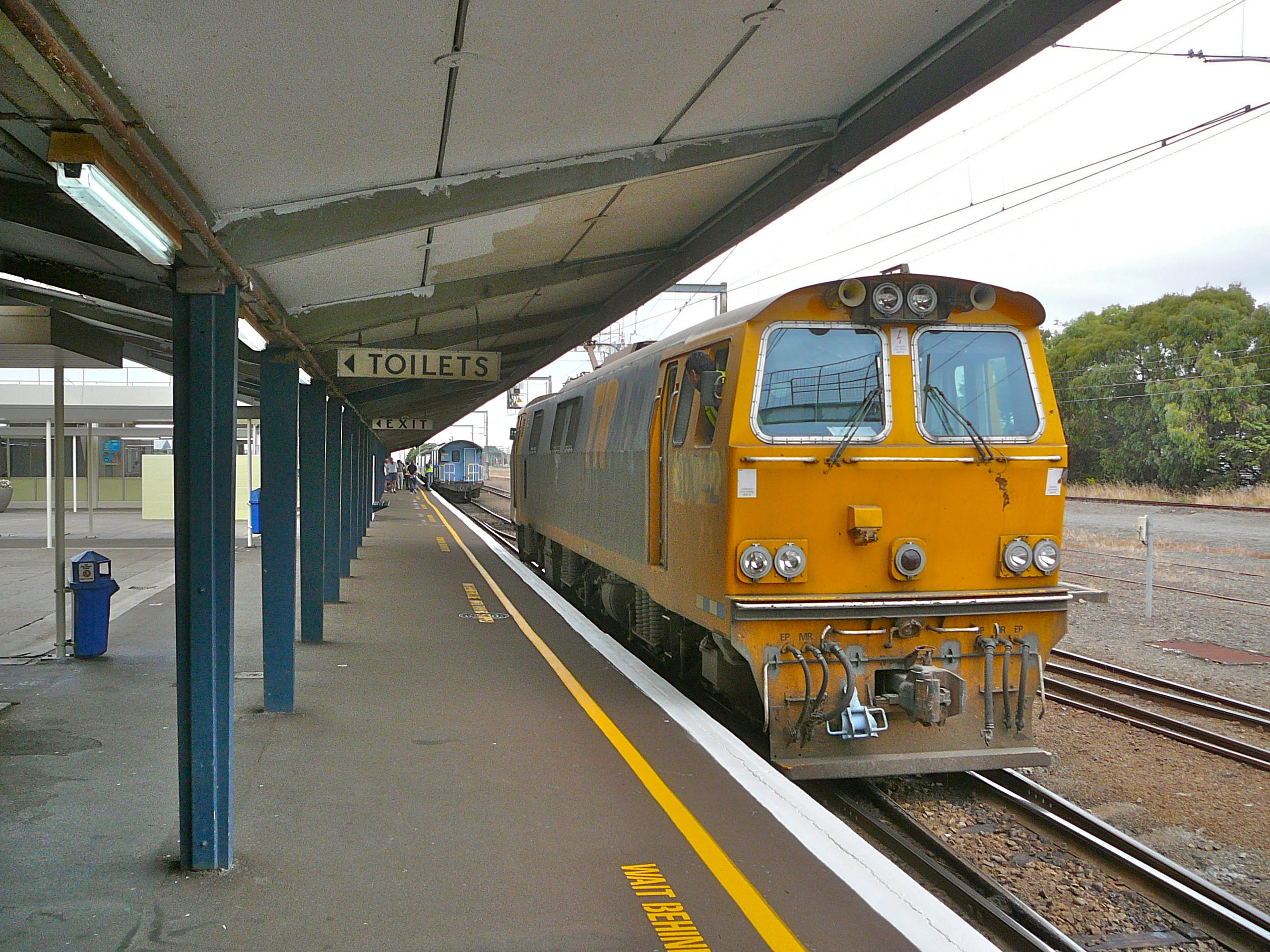
EF 30042 heading to couple with the Overlander at the Palmerston North railway station.

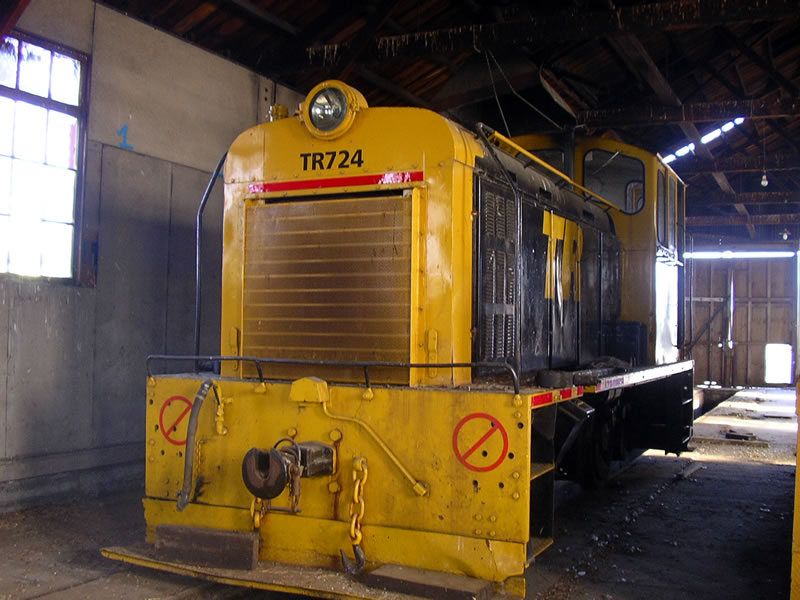
TR 724 in storage in Carterton, while preserved by the Wairarapa Railway Restoration Society.

== See also ==
- List of NZ railfan jargon
