= New Zealand DB class locomotive =

Class of diesel-electric locomotive

New Zealand DB/DBR class
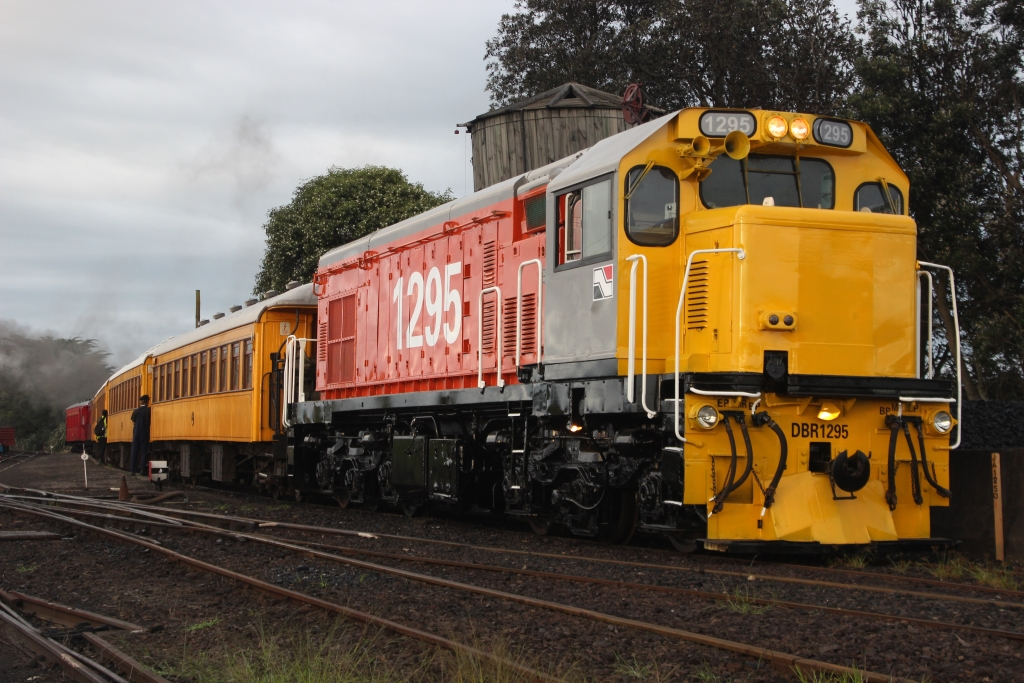
- GVR No.12 (DBR 1295) at Pukeoware Depot on the Glenbrook Vintage Railway
Type and origin
- Power type: Diesel-electric
- Builder: General Motors Diesel Canada (builder); Clyde Engineering, Australia (rebuilder)
- Model: EMD G8
- Build date: 1965–1966 (built); 1980–1982 (rebuilt)
- Total produced: 17
- Number rebuilt: 10
Specifications
- Configuration
  - UIC: A1A-A1A
- Gauge: 3 ft 6 in (1,067 mm)
- Length: 14.0 m (45 ft 11 in)
- Adhesive weight: DB 47.0 t (46.3 long tons; 51.8 short tons); DBR 46.0 t (45.3 long tons; 50.7 short tons)
- Loco weight: DB 69.0 t (67.9 long tons; 76.1 short tons); DBR 68.0 t (66.9 long tons; 75.0 short tons)
- Prime mover: DB GM 8-567C; DBR GM 8-645C
- Engine type: V8 Diesel engine
- Aspiration: Roots-type supercharger
- Displacement: DB 74.33 litres (4,536 cu in); DBR 84.56 litres (5,160 cu in)
- Traction motors: Four EMD D29
- Cylinders: 8
- Cylinder size: 230 mm (9 1/16 in) x 250 mm (9.8 in)
Performance figures
- Maximum speed: 100 km/h (62 mph)
- Power output: DBR 709 kW (951 hp)
- Tractive effort: 100 kN (22,000 lb_{f})
Career
- Number in class: 17
- Numbers: DB 1000–1016 (original); DB 1001–1180 (TMS); DBR 1199–1295
- First run: DB 1965 – 1966; DBR October 1980 – October 1982
- Last run: DB 1986 – 1989; DBR 2002 - 28 October 2017
- Disposition: 7 DBs and 2 DBRs scrapped 2 DBRs preserved 6 DBRs in industrial use

The New Zealand DB class and DBR class (Note: Following the introduction of Traffic Monitoring System (TMS) in 1979, the class classification was capitalised, whereas previously the second letter was a smaller capital letter, that is D^{B}) locomotive is a type of diesel-electric locomotive built for service on New Zealand's rail network. They were built by General Motors Diesel (GMD) of Canada as a narrow-gauge version of the EMD G8 model, with seventeen locomotives constructed. Ten of these were later rebuilt into the DBR class.

== Introduction ==
The D^{B} class was introduced to the rail network in 1965-1966 as a result of a requirement for a modern locomotive that could operate on the North Island lines that the D^{A} class was excluded from due to their weight and axle load. They were ordered at the same time as the final D^{A} order was placed. While these were mainly branch lines, it also applied to the East Coast Main Trunk line, particularly the section beyond Paeroa through the Karangahake and Athenree gorges until the opening of the Kaimai Tunnel on 12 September 1978.

The class was virtually indistinguishable externally from the D^{A} class, being of the same basic design and dimensions, and wearing the same livery. They were some 13 tonnes lighter with a V8 prime mover as opposed to a V12 in the D^{A} class, though the classes shared the same A1A-A1A wheel configuration and traction motors for commonality. The locomotives were supplied with cast-steel bogies manufactured by Dofasco, but these were swapped with phase I D^{A} class locomotives, which were delivered with fabricated bogies, once the D^{B} class entered service.

=== Numbering ===
The class was initially numbered D^{B} 1000 to D^{B} 1016, this being in common with NZR practice of the time to number locomotive classes with reference to the power output.

Upon the introduction of the computerised Traffic Monitoring System (TMS) in 1979 the class was renumbered and the designation capitalised. The class received new four-digit numbers beginning with 1, in which the last number is a check digit for the whole number. Under the new system, D^{B} 1001 retained its number, becoming DB1001, with D^{B} 1000 becoming DB1018. The rest of the class was renumbered in sequence, with D^{B} 1016 becoming DB1180.

The units being rebuilt to DBR received a new TMS number in the 12XX range when they entered the rebuilding cycle.

== Rebuild to DBR ==
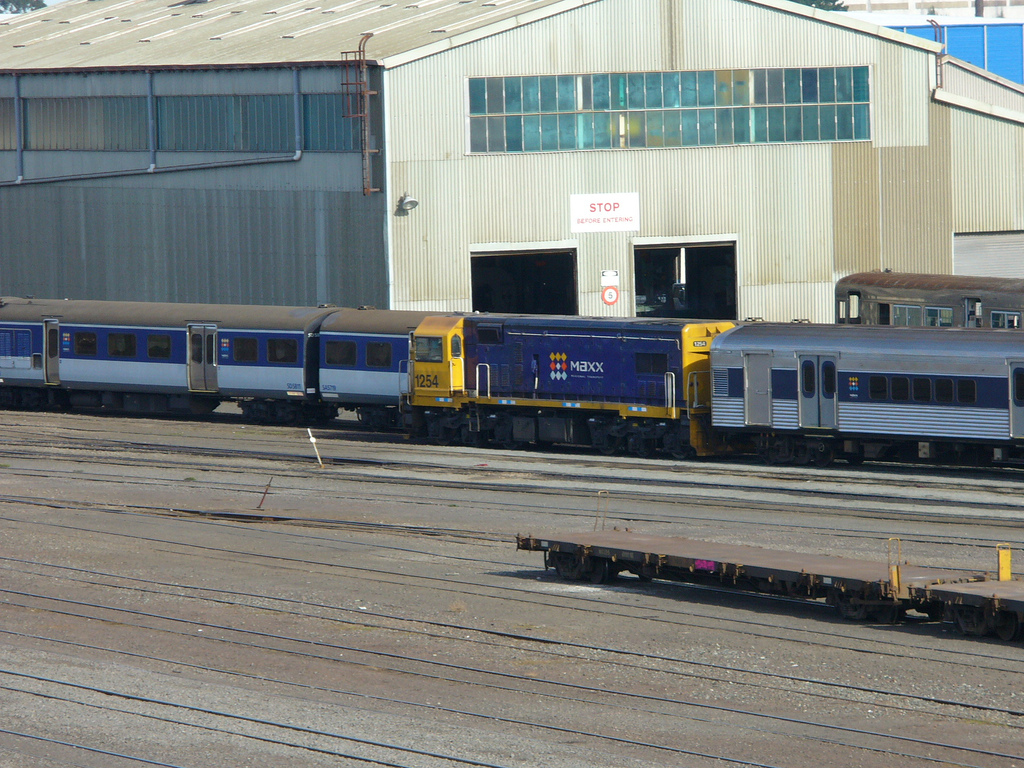
DBR 1254 at Westfield, Auckland, 13 August 2007

In the late 1970s the decision was made to rebuild the D^{B} class along similar lines to that being undertaken for the D^{A} class into the DC class. The rebuilt D^{B} units were designated as DBR (R = rebuild). The rebuilds were done by Clyde Engineering in Australia and involved the lowering of the short hood to improve visibility for the driver, new cabs similar to the DC class, and the installation of a new EMD 8-645 engine. Ten units were rebuilt between 1980 and 1982.

== In service ==
The D^{B} class was employed primarily freight duties, though they did also see occasional service hauling passenger trains. As lines and bridges were upgraded, and in the case of the ECMT the Kaimai Tunnel opening, the weight advantage the locomotives had over other classes used in the North Island became less of a factor and the locomotives were operated as part of a general pool.

Initially, all DBR class locomotives were allocated to the North Island. The lightweight nature of the DBR locomotives meant they were well suited to operate some South Island lines following the withdrawal of the DI and DJ class locomotives in the early 1990s. The last DBR returned north from the South Island around 2007.

=== Auckland Transport ===
From June 2003 to 17 April 2014 two locomotives were leased to the Auckland Regional Transport Authority and then its successor, Auckland Transport, with the services operated under contract by Transdev. The two locomotives, DBR1199 and DBR1254 were operated in a top and tail configuration with the five-car SX carriages set and wore the MAXX Blue livery. A third unit, DBR1226, was also painted in MAXX Blue but without the MAXX logo. DBR1226 was used for freight services or work trains by KiwiRail, but was used as backup for DBR1199 or DBR1254 as it had the necessary modifications to work with the suburban carriages. The leases expired in 2014, and the locomotives returned to freight service.

=== Wellington bankers ===
For many years two DBR class locomotives formed the basis of a banker set out of Wellington, primarily assisting trains between Wellington and Paekakariki but also performing multiple other jobs including the Hutt Workshops shunt, work trains around the region and any unusual movements. DBRs 1199 and 1200 were the initial pair, becoming known as the "Bobsy Twins" (sp), likely a reference to the Bobbsey Twins due mainly to their consecutive numbers (a rarity under the TMS numbering system). In the early 2000s DBR1199 suffered a failure and was withdrawn from service and laid up, replaced on the banker set by DBR1267. DBR1199 was later sent to Hillside for repair and use on the Auckland SX set commuter trains, by which time the pairing of DBRs 1200 and 1267 had become known simply as "The Twins". DBR1267 was later transferred to Auckland to replace DBR1282, with the Wellington banking role taken over by other locomotives.

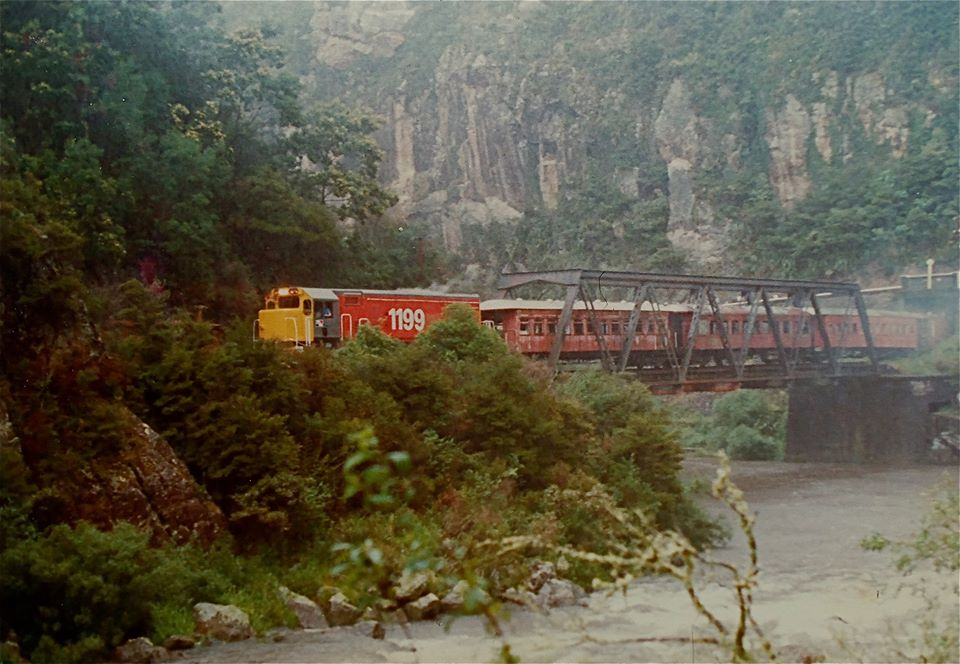
DBR1199, Karangahake Gorge, 8 November 1980, on the former East Coast Main Trunk route

=== Livery ===
The locomotives were delivered in the same overall deep red livery as the D^{A} class, with the same white stripes along the sides and "wings" on the ends. With the introduction of TMS the locomotives road numbers were applied in large white numbers to the long hoods.

This livery was worn by many of the original DBs until their retirement, while the DBRs were returned to service in the International Orange or "Fruit Salad" scheme (red and grey with yellow safety ends) being applied to most NZR locomotive classes at the time. DBs 1082 and 1099 also received this livery in the 1980s.

DBR 1295 was repainted into the Toll Rail "Corn Cob" scheme (yellow and green), and the three units used on Auckland services have received the MAXX Blue livery (deep blue and yellow). More recently DBR 1267 has received the KiwiRail grey, red and yellow scheme.

== Withdrawal and disposal ==
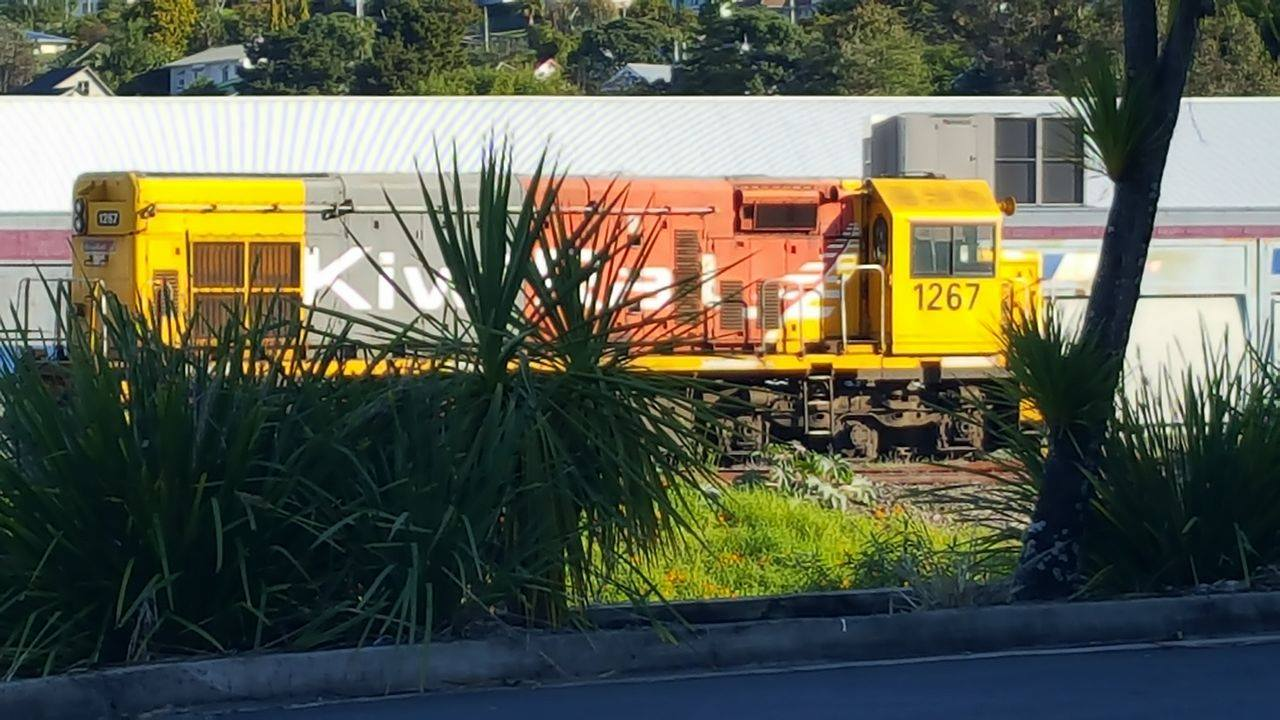
DBR 1267 at Whangarei on 29 April 2016

All locomotives have been withdrawn from service. The locomotives were withdrawn on account of being either surplus to requirements or in poor mechanical condition. All of the DB locomotives were withdrawn by February 1989. In the early 2000s, DBRs 1199, 1239 and 1241 were withdrawn and placed into storage at Hutt Workshops. DBR1199 was reinstated a year later for suburban trains in Auckland, and 1239 and 1241 were scrapped at Hutt Workshops in February 2008.

More withdrawals commenced in July 2013, with 1200 being the first. A few more were laid-up over the next few months. In February 2014, 1267, 1282 and 1295 were reinstated due to the DL class locomotives being taken out of service after samples from one locomotive tested positive for asbestos. Withdrawals began again in May of that year when 1282 was laid up. The rest have been withdrawn, with 1226 being the last.

In June 2017, KiwiRail issued a Request for Quotation (RFQ) via the Government Electronic Tendering Service (GETS). In August 2017, it was announced that DBRs 1254 and 1295 have been purchased by the Glenbrook Vintage Railway. The remaining DBRs were originally sold to a locomotive/rolling stock dealer in South Africa, but have now been sold to DBM Contracting.

== Preservation ==
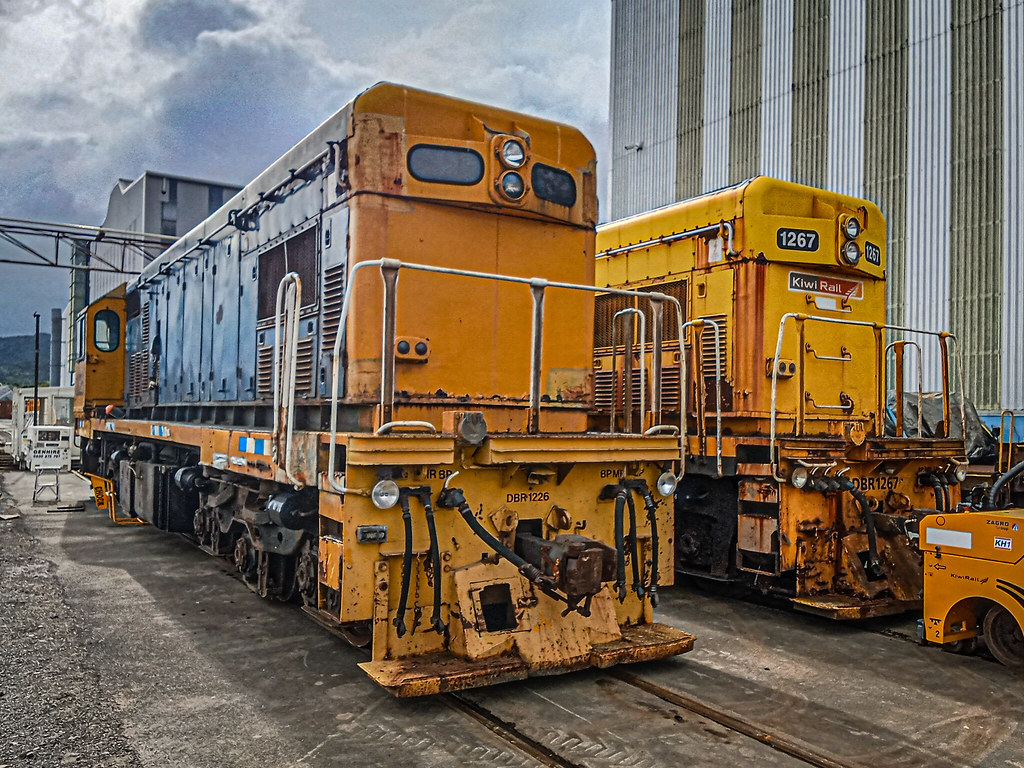
DBR1226 & DBR1267 at Hutt Workshops, 13th October 2025

Preserved by DBM Contracting:

- DBR1199 - At Goldfields Railway, Operational
- DBR1200 - Stored at Taumarunui
- DBR1213 - Stored at Taumarunui
- DBR1226 - Stored at Mission Bush Steel Mill
- DBR1267 - Stored at Mission Bush Steel Mill
- DBR1282 - At Goldfields Railway, Operational

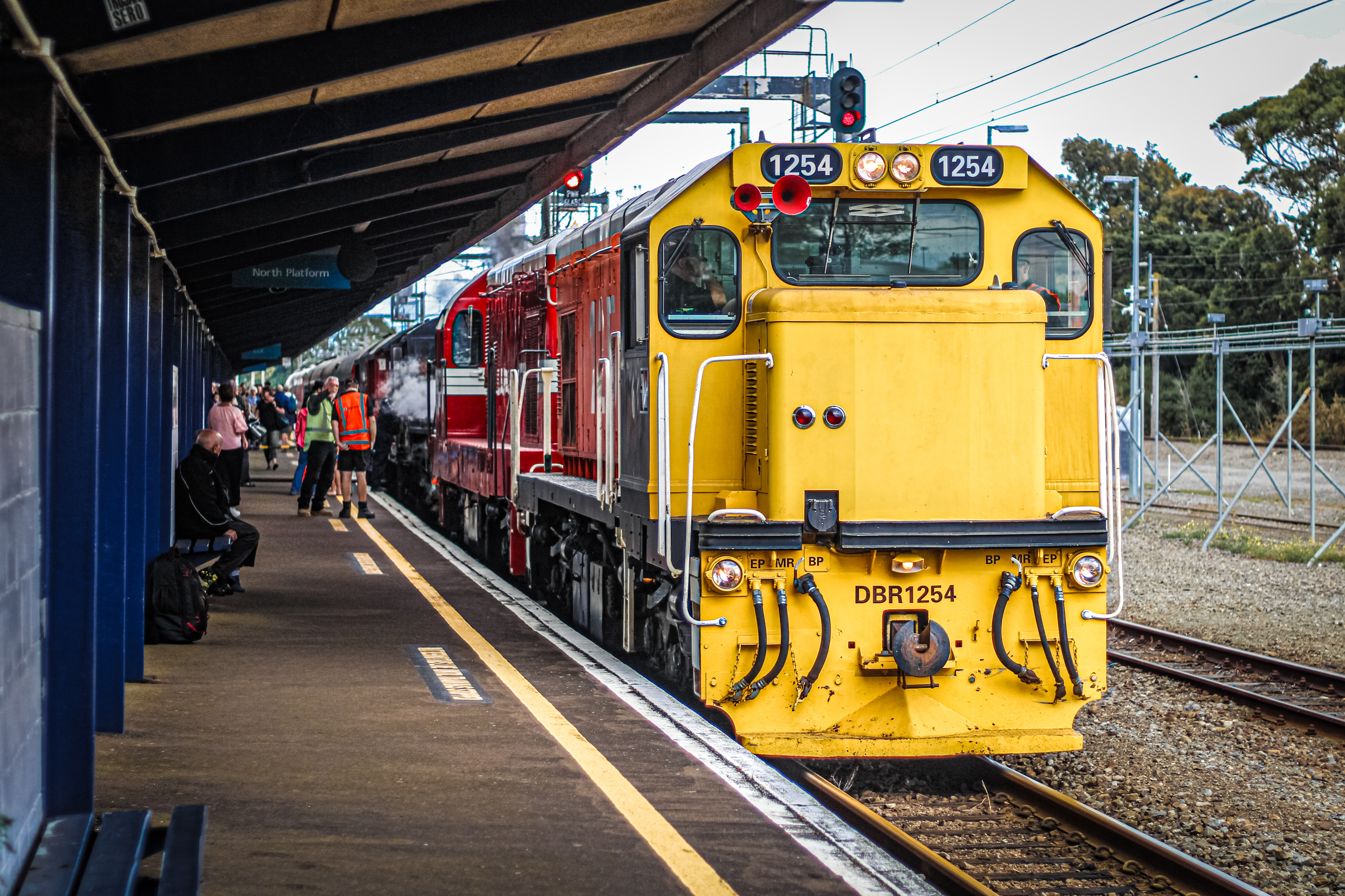
DBR1254 at Palmerston North Railway Station, 11th of January 2026

Preserved by Glenbrook Vintage Railway:

- DBR1254 - Mainline certified
- DBR1295 - GVR only

In August 2017, it was announced by the Glenbrook Vintage Railway that they had purchased DBRs 1254 and 1295 for eventually hauling mainline excursions. After being stored at Hutt Workshops, the pair arrived on-site on 3 November 2017. In March 2018, 1295 was repainted in the "International Orange" livery. In May 2018, work started on overhauling 1254 for mainline certification. Both have been given GVR numbers, which are No.11 and No.12 respectively. DBR 1254's restoration was completed in September 2019, and is now mainline certified.
