= Cato Blue (livery) =

New Zealand railway locomotive livery

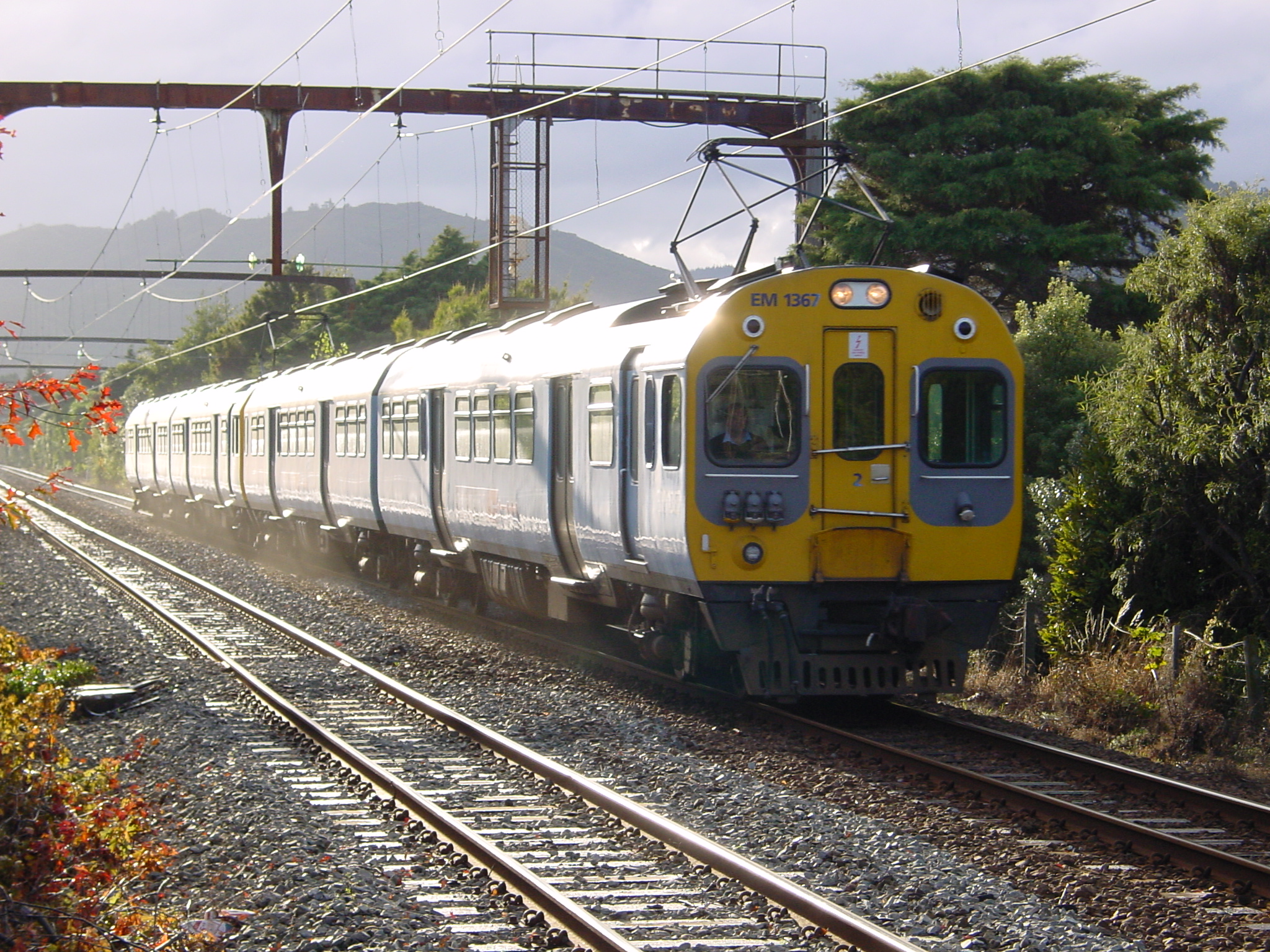
EM1367/ET3367 leading another Ganz-Mavag EMU set while passing through Epuni, in the Cato Blue livery

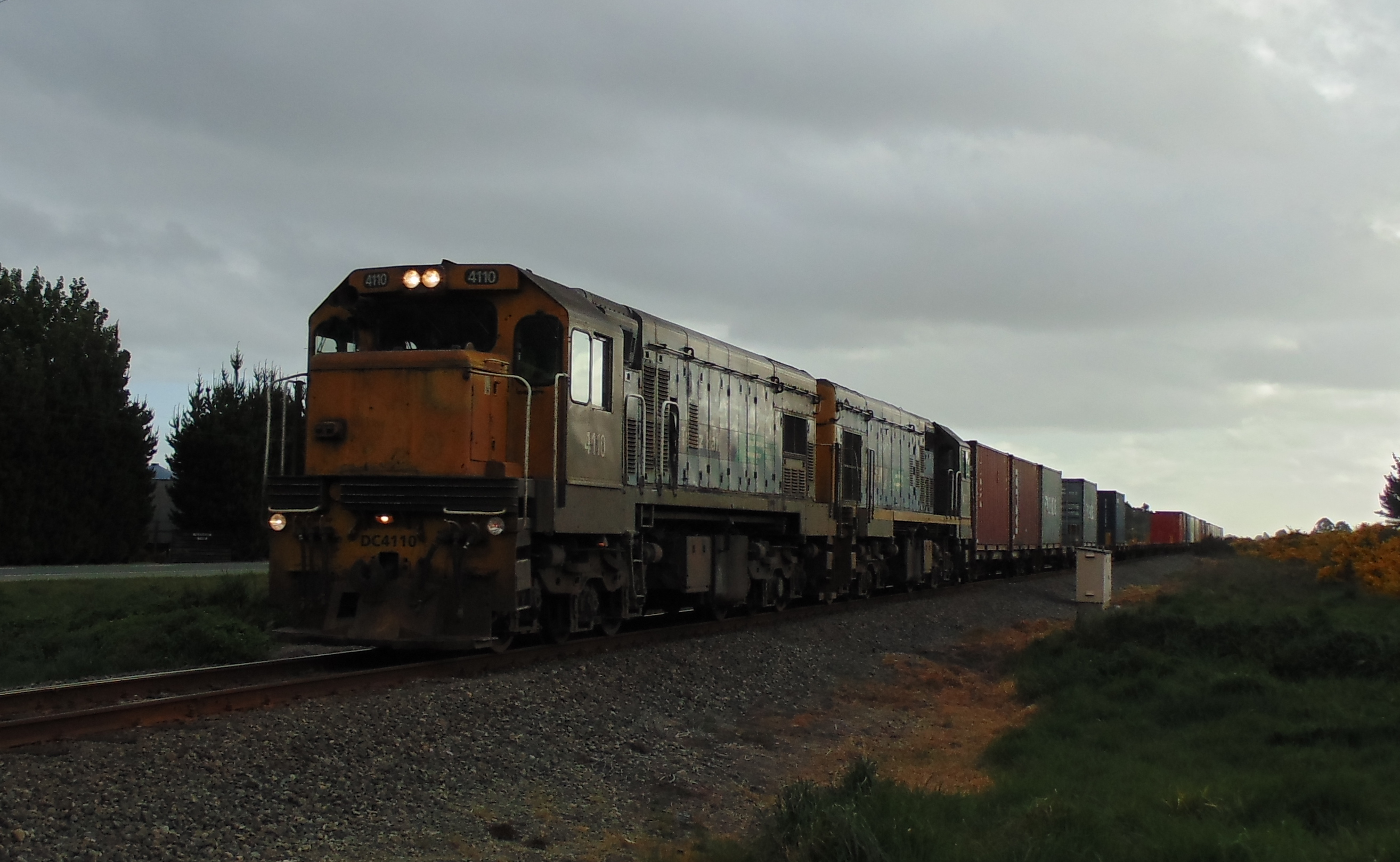
DC4110 and DCP4755 with a freight train approaching Tinwald

Cato Blue is the name used for the initial Tranz Rail corporate colour scheme that was applied across the business, and in particular is used as the name of the livery applied to locomotives, carriages and other rolling stock in this era. The livery was introduced by Tranz Rail, formerly New Zealand Rail Limited, as part of a rebrand in 1995 with the listing of Tranz Rail on the New Zealand Exchange and NASDAQ stock exchanges on 18 October 1995. The scheme was known as Cato Blue after its creator, Cato Partners.

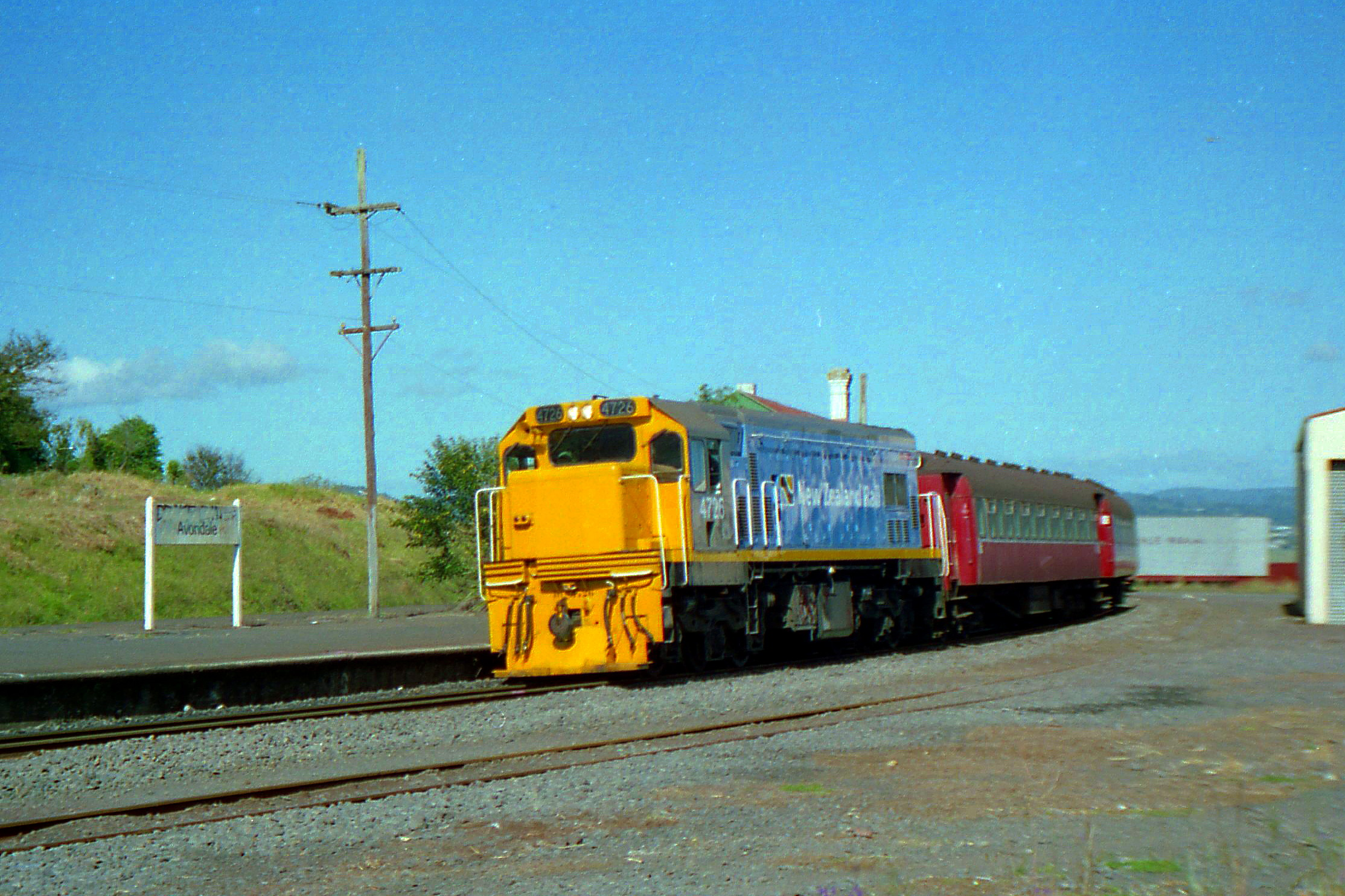
DC4726 in NZ Rail Blue at Avondale

As applied to locomotives, the livery was very similar to the preceding NZ Rail Blue livery, which was introduced in 1991. The main changes were a lighter blue than the mid-blue previously used, and the Tranz Rail branding applied to the long hood instead of the previous New Zealand Rail branding. In most other respects, the new Cato Blue was broadly similar. The new colour was first applied to DFT7160 but retained the New Zealand Railway branding. 4 other locomotives followed in the same colour but without the branding ahead of the Tranz Rail corporate image launch, and carriage A2028 also received a repaint in this colour. A slightly darker shade of blue was used following the brand launch, but was overall a much lighter shade than the previous NZ Rail Blue.

Additionally, all of the 44 Ganz-Mavag built EM/ET electric multiple units, along with one of the English Electric built DM/D EMU units were also repainted in the Cato Blue livery, with the Tranz Metro logo on the side of each car. Tranz Scenics 56-foot, 60-foot carriages, and AG vans were also repainted in the livery. Long distance carriages had the Tranz Scenic logo applied, while short-and-medium distance cars used mainly for commuter services (such as the Capital Connection and Wairarapa suburban service cars) had the Tranz Metro logo. A number of cars used mainly for charter fleet services had the Tranz Rail logo applied instead. Also, track recording car EM80 was also repainted in Cato Blue.

It was then replaced on locomotives in May 2001 when Tranz Rail introduced the Bumble-Bee livery to promote level crossing safety.. The rights to the livery were sold to Tranz Scenic 2001 Ltd when the passenger business was sold in 2002, and remained in use as the primary livery on the long distance passenger train fleet until the arrival of the AK Class carriages in 2011.

== Variations ==
Since the introduction of the livery in October 1995, there have been a couple of variations on several locomotives:

- Several locomotives that were repainted in the NZ Rail Blue livery, had a large Cato Blue patch applied over the New Zealand Rail logo on the long hood, and the Tranz Rail logo then applied over that. Some of these locomotives received the livery with blue cab stripes. The long hood patch tended to fade towards white over time.
- DX5431 and DX5517 had been repainted into the livery, but yellow cabs instead of grey. Both locos were painted in the original version before being repainted in this variation, and later they had black chutes fitted on the right side of the long-hood.
- DC4110 did not get a yellow stripe along the top of the running board side, instead retaining the all black style of the previous International Orange livery.
- DC4559, DC4761 and DC4513 received repaints after purchase by Tranz Scenic 2001 where the Tranz Scenic logo was used instead of the previous Tranz Rail logo. DC4761 also had the whole sides of the running board painted yellow, instead of just the top band.
- All QR Class locomotives received a simplified version of the Cato Blue livery where the grey was omitted and Cato Blue used instead. This variation did not have a name, but is analogous to the "Flying Tomato" variant of the International Orange livery.
- Although not an official variation, DCP4755 received KiwiRail stickers on the front of the short-hood, and on the back of the long-hood.
- DSC2624 was repainted by Tranz Scenic with the cab being repainted yellow, instead of grey.
