= New Zealand DH class locomotive =

Class of diesel-electric locomotive

New Zealand DH class (1978)
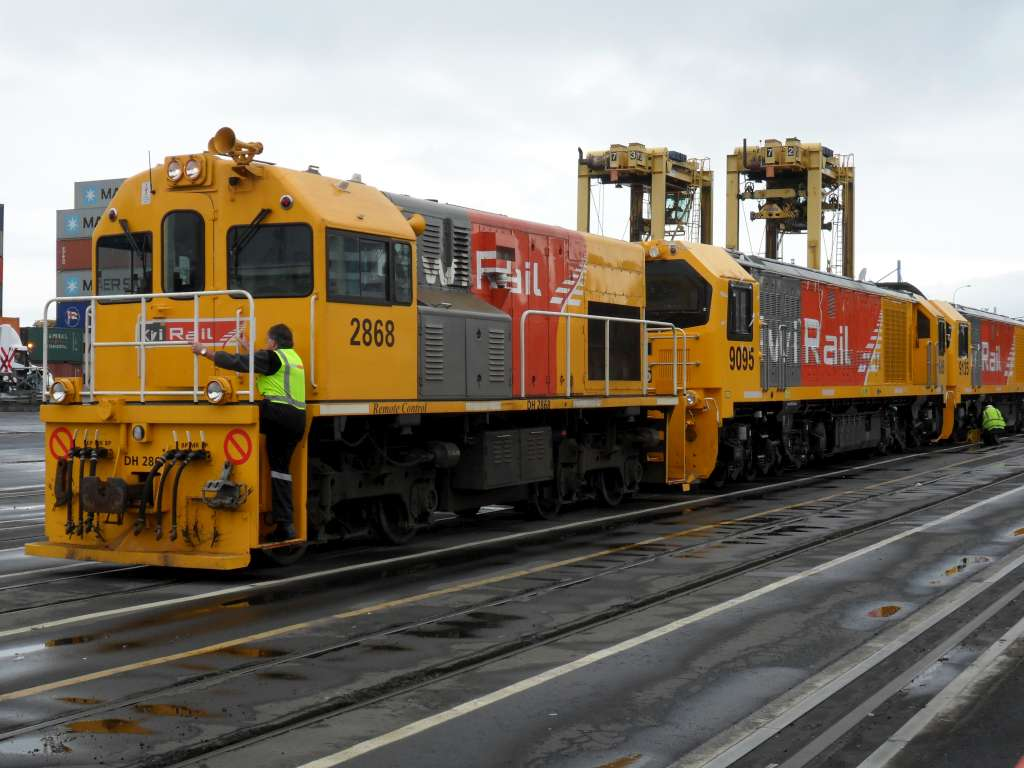
- DH 2868 shunting two new DLs at Port of Auckland, on 3 June 2011.
Type and origin
- Power type: Diesel-Electric Shunter
- Builder: General Electric, United States
- Model: U10B
- Build date: 1978
Specifications
- Configuration
  - UIC: Bo'Bo'
  - Commonwealth: Bo-Bo
- Length: 11.2 m (36 ft 9 in)
- Loco weight: 54 tonnes (53 long tons; 60 short tons)
- Prime mover: Caterpillar D398
- RPM range: 1300 rpm
- Engine type: V12 Diesel engine
- Aspiration: Turbocharged
- Generator: General Electric GT-601
- Traction motors: Four General Electric 761
- Cylinders: 12
- Cylinder size: 159 mm × 203 mm (6 in × 8 in)
Performance figures
- Maximum speed: 112 km/h (70 mph)
- Power output: 672 kW (901 hp)
- Tractive effort: 146 kN (33,000 lb_{f})
Career
- Number in class: 6
- Numbers: 900 - 905 (original); 2816 - 2868 (TMS)
- Locale: Upper North Island, mainly around Auckland
- First run: September 1978 - March 1979
- Disposition: All in service

The New Zealand DH class locomotive (Note: Following the introduction of TMS in 1979, the class classification was capitalised, whereas previously the second letter was a smaller capital letter, that is D^{H}) is a type of diesel-electric heavy transfer and shunting locomotive in New Zealand's national railway network. The class consists of six heavy shunt U10B type locomotives built by General Electric United States at their Erie, Pennsylvania plant in 1978. Five of the class are used in the Auckland area for heavy shunting duties, including services around Auckland and the Port of Auckland, while one is based at the Port of Tauranga in Mount Maunganui.

== Introduction ==
Originally an order for Philippine National Railways 2500 Class, the six locomotives were purchased as by coincidence NZR needed a heavy shunter for Auckland container port transfer work. At the time two DSC class shunters were linked in tandem to perform this task. The DH class are a light locomotive that is geared to run at 100 km/h (62 mph).

They saw occasional service on the then under-used Auckland suburban passenger network where they performed well, but NZR focused them on their intended purpose, heavy shunting. In the late 1980s, NZR provided a DH locomotive to the Tasman Pulp and Paper mill in Kawerau to trial for sale as a heavy shunter in the mill's rail yards. The mill turned down the offer, instead, they purchased a DA class locomotive to perform shunting duties. In July 1979 D^{H} 905 was trialled at the Te Rapa marshalling yards in Hamilton, but the trial was unsuccessful and the locomotive returned to Auckland later that year. All DH locomotives were allocated to Westfield (Auckland) in 1990.

== Classification ==
The class should not be confused with the English Electric DH class of 1956; as all of the old DHs had been reclassified as DG in 1968, the classification was re-used.

== Upgrades ==
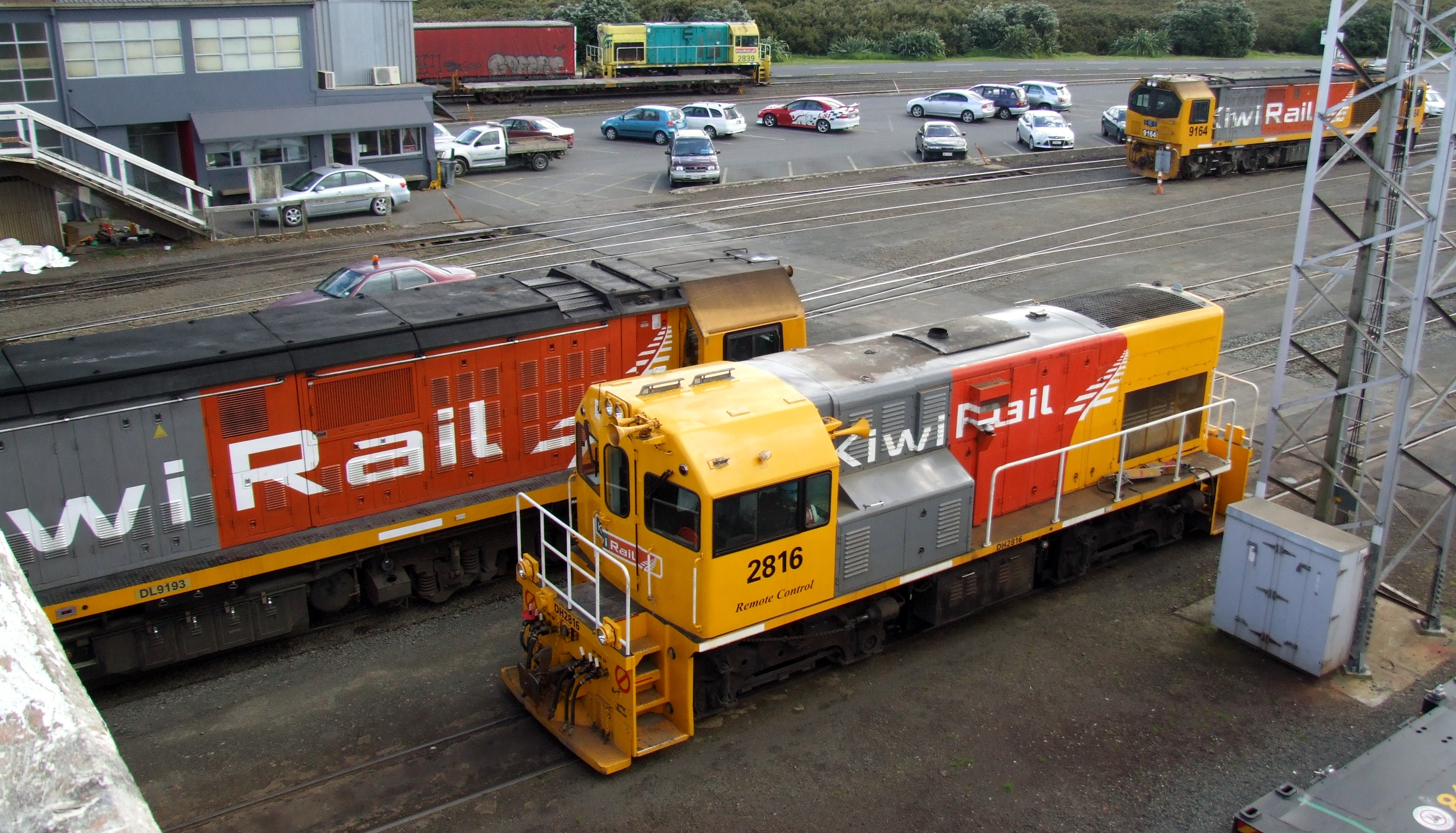
DH2816 at Westfield in Auckland, with DH2839 in the background, 21 January 2013

The locomotives were upgraded in the late 1990s with shunters refuges at the front and back of the locomotives, in line with other New Zealand shunting locomotives at the time. In the 2010s the class were upgraded again for multiple unit (MU) operation.

== Other users ==
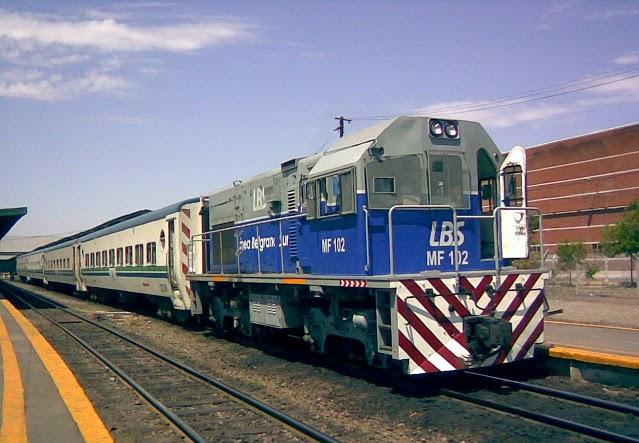
GE U10B of Ferrocarril Belgrano Sur, on 1 October 2008

The Hedjaz Jordan Railway has three GE U10B locomotives of 1,050 mm (3 ft 5 11/32 in) gauge. These are of A1A-A1A wheel arrangement. Another user is the Belgrano Sur Line (Buenos Aires), Argentina. The Bogotá Savannah Railway has two GE U10B locomotives
