= New Zealand DSG class locomotive =

New Zealand DSG class
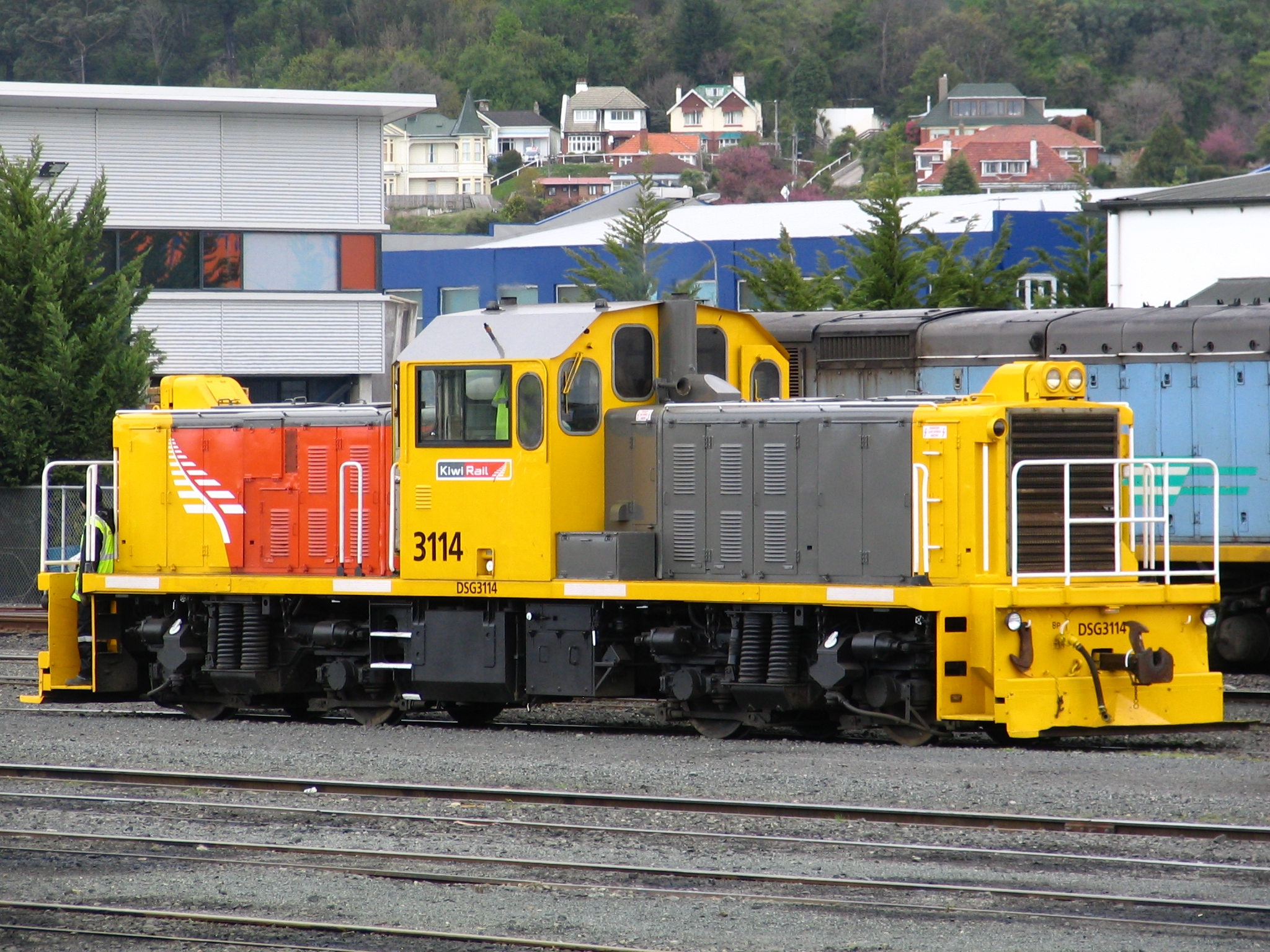
- DSG 3114 in Dunedin, 2009
Type and origin
- Power type: Diesel-Electric Shunter
- Builder: Toshiba Heavy Industries, Japan
- Build date: 1981–1983
Specifications
- Configuration
  - UIC: Bo-Bo
- Gauge: 3 ft 6 in (1,067 mm)
- Length: 13.5 metres (44 ft 3 in)
- Loco weight: 56 tonnes (55 long tons; 62 short tons)
- Prime mover: Two Cummins KTA-1150L
- RPM range: 1800 rpm
- Engine type: I6 Diesel engine
- Generator: Two Toshiba SDT 1144
- Traction motors: Four Toshiba SE 2314
- Cylinders: 16
- Cylinder size: 159 mm × 159 mm (6.3 in × 6.3 in)
Performance figures
- Maximum speed: 60 km/h (37 mph)
- Power output: 700 kW (940 hp)
- Tractive effort: 130 kN (29,000 lb_{f})
Career
- Number in class: 24
- Numbers: DSG 3005–3304
- First run: March 1981–1983
- Disposition: In service

The New Zealand DSG class is a type of diesel-electric shunting locomotive used in New Zealand. The class shares a central cab design with the smaller DSC class shunting locomotive, and is twin-engined. Meanwhile, the very similarly designed, single-engined DSJ class, has a cab that is offset from the centre.

== Introduction ==
The DSG class shunters were built in four batches from 1981 to 1983. The first batch of six locomotives was introduced in 1981, followed by batches in 1982 and 1983.

== In Service ==
The locomotives have seen widespread use throughout New Zealand, particularly in larger yards and for port traffic. They also see service on sections of mainline, performing regional shunt duties in a number of areas.

== Livery ==
All DSG class locomotives are in the KiwiRail Mark 2 colour scheme (Vertical separations of main colours on car body).
