= New Zealand DSJ class locomotive =

New Zealand DSJ class
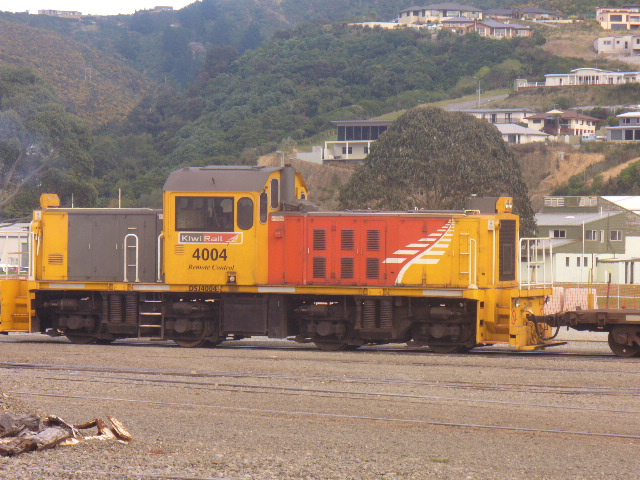
- DSJ4004 in Picton, April 2012
Type and origin
- Power type: Diesel-Electric
- Builder: Toshiba Heavy Industries, Japan (1) NZR Addington Workshops (4)
- Build date: 1984–1985
- Total produced: 5
Specifications
- Configuration
  - UIC: Bo'Bo'
- Gauge: 1,067 mm (3 ft 6 in)
- Prime mover: One: Cummins KTA-1150L
- Engine type: 6-cyl diesel engine
Career
- Operators: New Zealand Railways, Tranz Rail, Toll Rail, KiwiRail
- Numbers: TMS: 4004–4060
- Locale: All of New Zealand
- Disposition: Four in service, one written off

The New Zealand DSJ class is a class of diesel-electric shunting locomotive used on the New Zealand rail network. The class has a very similar overall design to the DSG class, but is instead single-engined, has a cab that is offset from the centre and is both shorter and lighter than its twin-engined counterpart.

== Introduction ==
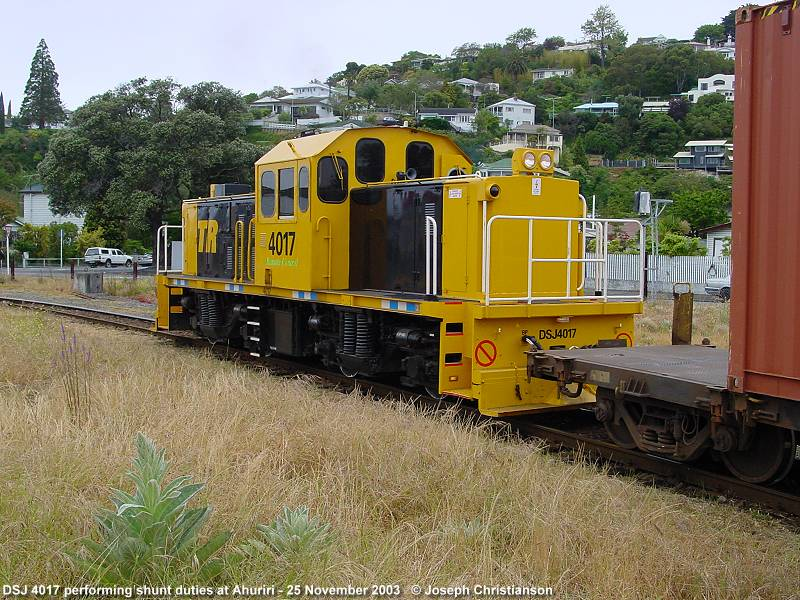
DSJ4017 performing shunt duties at Ahuriri, 2003

The first DSJ was assembled in Japan by Toshiba Heavy Industries in 1983 and arrived in New Zealand in 1984. Toshiba are the same company who built the EO class electric locomotives. The remaining four were assembled at the former Addington Workshops in Christchurch, and entered service from 1984 to 1985.

With only five members in this class, it represents one of the smallest contingents of shunting locomotives in current use.

== In service ==
The locomotives have spent most of their time in use at the Te Rapa Marshalling Yard and Picton, and have ventured elsewhere on the network from time to time, including Ahuriri in Napier.

== Accidents ==
On the afternoon of 1 September 2021, DSJ4004 and a wagon went off the end of the rail ferry linkspan at Picton and into the harbour. The wagon and locomotive were retrieved from the harbour on 2 and 3 September 2021 respectively. No one was injured during the incident. Due to the cost of repairing the flooded locomotive, DSJ4004 was written off and became a parts donor for the remainder of the fleet.
