= NZR JA class =

New Zealand steam locomotive class

NZR J^{A} class
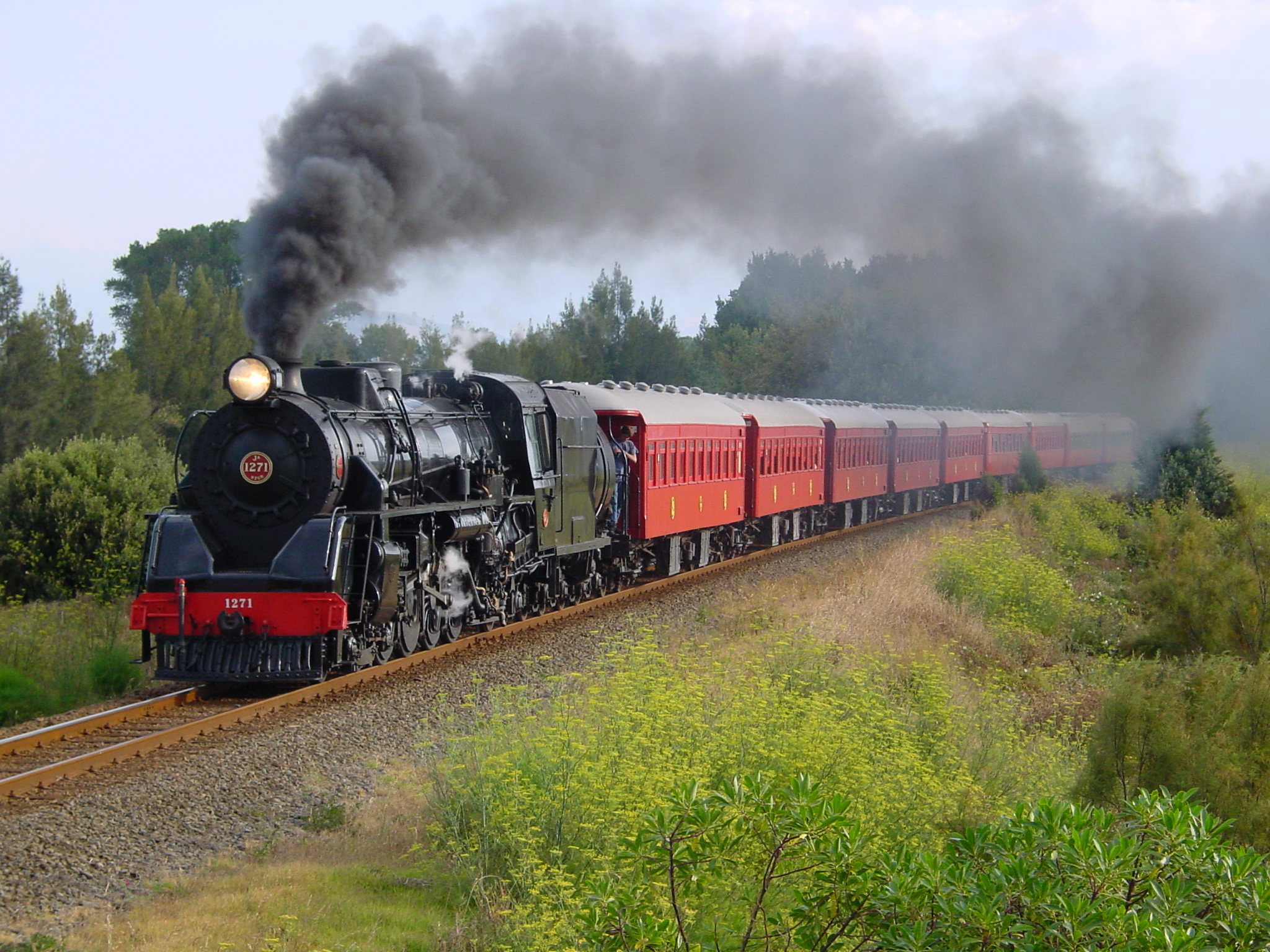
- J^{A} 1271 with excursion consist on approach to Ahuriri on 14 February 2003.
Type and origin
- Power type: Steam
- Builder: NZR Hillside Workshops (35); North British Locomotive Company (16)
- Build date: 1946–1956
Specifications
- Configuration
  - Whyte: 4-8-2
- Driver: 2nd coupled axle
- Gauge: 3 ft 6 in (1,067 mm)
- Leading dia.: 2 ft 6 1/2 in (0.77 m)
- Coupled dia.: 4 ft 6 in (1.37 m)
- Trailing dia.: 2 ft 9 in (0.84 m)
- Tender wheels: 2 ft 6 1/2 in (0.77 m)
- Wheelbase: 58 ft 0 in (17.68 m)
  - Engine: 33 ft 1 1/2 in (10.10 m)
  - Leading: 6 ft 0 in (1.83 m)
  - Coupled: 14 ft 3 in (4.34 m)
  - Tender: 15 ft 10 1/2 in (4.84 m)
  - Tender bogie: 5 ft 0 in (1.52 m)
- Length: 66 ft 11 1/2 in (20.41 m)
- Width: 8 ft 6 in (2.59 m)
- Height: 11 ft 7 in (3.53 m)
- Frame type: Bar
- Adhesive weight: 44.45 long tons (45.16 t; 49.78 short tons)
- Loco weight: 69.1 long tons (70.2 t; 77.4 short tons)
- Tender weight: 40.35 long tons (41.00 t; 45.19 short tons)
- Total weight: 109.45 long tons (111.21 t; 122.58 short tons)
- Fuel type: Coal (Hillside); Oil (North British)
- Fuel capacity: 6.0 long tons (6.1 t; 6.7 short tons) coal 1,350 imp gal (6,100 L; 1,620 US gal) oil
- Water cap.: 4,000 imp gal (18,000 L; 4,800 US gal)
- Firebox
  - Grate area: 39.0 square feet (3.6 m^{2})
- Boiler
  - Pitch: 7 ft 7 1/2 in (2.32 m)
- Boiler pressure: 200 psi (1,400 kPa)
- Feedwater heater: None: Fitted with Davies & Metcalfe Exhaust Injector
- Heating surface: 1,469 square feet (136.5 m^{2})
- Superheater
  - Heating area: 283 square feet (26.3 m^{2})
- Cylinders: Two
- Cylinder size: 18 in × 26 in (457 mm × 660 mm)
- Valve gear: Baker
Performance figures
- Maximum speed: 75 miles per hour (121 km/h)
- Tractive effort: 24,960 lbf (111.0 kN)
Career
- Number in class: 51
- Numbers: 1240 – 1274 (Hillside); 1275 – 1290 (North British)
- Locale: All of New Zealand (Note: Hillside built members were allocated to the South Island, and the North British members were allocated to the North Island.)
- First run: 1947 – 1956 (Hillside); 1952 (North British)
- Last run: 16 November 1971
- Retired: 1967–1971
- Scrapped: 1969–1972
- Disposition: Seven preserved, remainder scrapped

The NZR J^{A} class is a class of fifty-one 4-8-2 steam locomotives operated by the New Zealand Railways Department (NZR). The locomotives were built in two batches; the first batch was constructed at the Hillside Workshops at Dunedin between 1946 and 1956, while the second batch was constructed by the North British Locomotive Company (NBL) of Glasgow, Scotland in 1951. To differentiate between the two batches, the locomotives were identified by their builder.

The J^{A} class was the last steam locomotive class to be produced by the NZR, with the Hillside-built J^{A} 1274 being the final steam locomotive ever built. The North British J^{A} class were also the last steam locomotives imported for the NZR.

The J^{A} class had relatively short service lives of between 12 and 24 years as they were replaced by diesel locomotives as part of the dieselisation process of the NZR. Nine J^{A} class managed to last until the end of steam on 26 October 1971.

== Hillside J^{A} of 1946 ==
=== Introduction ===
The class was an improved version of the J class locomotives. Unlike the J class, which were built overseas by the North British Locomotive Company (NBLC), the new locomotives were instead constructed by the NZR's Hillside Workshops in Dunedin. Much of the components, such as the bar frames, were still sourced from the NBLC as the Hillside lacked the means to construct such components.

In most other respects, the class was virtually identical to the earlier J class, except for being fitted with a bullet-nose streamlining. In mechanical respects, the J^{A} class had some notable improvements from the J class. These include the use of the Westinghouse cross-compound pump, Ashton double pressure gauge, the Sellars injector in the cab, and combined gauges in the cab. Instead of taking steam for the pump from the outlet on the steam dome, these were collected from the manifold in the cab. Except for the first two J^{A} class to be produced, No. 1242 and 1243, the locomotives were fitted with roller bearings to their driving and connecting rods. On the rest of the locomotives numbered in the 124X range, roller bearings were only present at the connection between the driving and connecting rods.

The first of the J^{A} class was constructed in 1946, but it was not until 1953 that the last 10 Hillside J^{A} boilers and two spare boilers were delivered by the NBLC. For this and several other factors, the last member of the class was not turned out from the workshops until 7 December 1956. That last locomotive, J^{A} 1274, turned out to be the last steam locomotive constructed for and by the NZR.

=== In service ===
The J^{A} class was intended for fast passenger trains in the South Island before the introduction of 88-seater railcars in 1956 and the decline in long-distance rail passenger services. Thus the class only ever worked in the South Island during their NZR career. The first members were based out of Dunedin, despite being intended for allocation to Christchurch. Over time, enough of the class were in service to displace the 10 members of the J class based out of Dunedin, which then headed north to join the rest of their class members on the North Island.

The J^{A} class were mainly used for both express passenger and express freight services running from Invercargill to Christchurch. During their brief prime on the South Island Main Trunk, they extended their duties from Bluff to Parnassus in the north, and as far west as Arthur's Pass on the Midland Line. Before the full delivery of the J^{A} class, English Electric diesel locomotives had already taken over the main freight services and summer express on the Dunedin-Oamaru section. The class was also restricted from running on long branch lines just like the Otago Central Railway or Kingston Branch for being too large.

All of the roller-bearing equipped J^{A} locomotives, Nos. 1265-1270 were allocated to the Linwood locomotive depot in Christchurch and were used to haul the South Island Limited train whenever possible between 1952 and 1968. One of these locomotives, the J^{A} 1270 was considered the fastest. They were particularly efficient on the relatively flat Invercargill-Dunedin section, as well as the fast run across the Canterbury Plains between Christchurch and Oamaru. The evening run back on train 144 to Christchurch was well known for being speedy, especially when the express train was running late and racing to get to the Lyttelton-Wellington Ferry before its sailing.

Although the official passenger train speed limit in New Zealand in that era was 50 miles per hour (80 km/h), the class was known to operate at higher speeds, especially across the Canterbury Plains, where they were officially allowed to run at 55 miles per hour (89 km/h). In some cases, trains were recorded running at 75 miles per hour (121 km/h). J^{A} 1267 pulled 10 carriages weighing 300 tons and covered the 42 miles (68 km) from Tinwald to Washdyke at 59.4 miles per hour (95.6 km/h). On occasion locomotives were recorded as attaining speeds in excess of 70 miles an hour.

=== Withdrawal and disposal ===
The J^{A} 1249 and 1272 were the first of their class and were not withdrawn until March 1968, in contrast to their J, J^{B}, and North British J^{A} cousins. Twelve J^{A} class, in addition to four J class, were fully overhauled in 1966. These were followed by six more in 1967 and two more in 1968.

The use of steam locomotives on freight trains on the East Coast of the South Island ended in March 1969. 15 J^{A} class and three Js (rebuilt with North Island J^{A} tenders and trailing engine bogies) remained operational.

The NZR provided a full overhaul on the last J^{A} 1267 in November 1968 with extensive use of parts from J^{A} 1268, including fitting a different boiler. J^{A} 1273 and 1274 had their low-mileage boilers transferred to other class members in 1967-68, and continued in service until 1971 with older boilers. The last three Js and these locomotives were frequently used on the South Island Limited in 1968 and 1969, on train 143 out of Christchurch and train 144 return of the Oamaru-Christchurch leg. They continued in that role until November 1970, when diesel-hauled Southerner replaced them.

It was also planned to dieselise the overnight Friday and Sunday express with surplus steam heat vans when the North Island Limited was replaced by the Silver Star, but delayed arrival of the carriages from Japan by a year meant that steam heat vans, which allowed diesel to operate night trains, would not be available until late 1971. Thus the J^{A} class remained ready for service into November, but in the end, they were never called upon.

Some locomotives like J^{A} 1271 were often sidelined due to mechanical defects or repairs. These steam locomotives were commonly used as stationary boilers and stripped of parts to keep the rest of the fleet operational, as it was common practice at the time.

== North British J^{A} of 1951 ==
=== Introduction ===
It was evident in 1950 that additional motive power was required in the North Island, but dieselisation had not yet begun. Consequently, NZR decided to order new locomotives from NBL to the design of the successful J class of 1939.

In January 1951, the order was placed for 16 J^{A} class locomotives as coal burners, which made the NBL regard it as essentially a repeat order for the J class. In April of the same year, the NZR Chief Mechanical Engineer requested the order be changed to oil-burning due to the perceived long-term coal shortage caused by the 1951 New Zealand waterfront dispute. The associated strike by miners, unavailability of shipping for coal, the expected long-term high imported coal price, and the long time it would take to build up coal stocks to safe levels were the main reasons for the change. The locomotives were eventually completed with oil burning equipment, without any grate, ash pan, or firebox doors, making them the only locomotives on the NZR to be built entirely as oil burners.

All these engines had several differences from both the J class and the Hillside J^{A} classes. They were manufactured with the cross-compound pump and had roller bearings limited to the connection between the driving wheels and connecting rods, while mechanical lubrication was employed.

ACFL blowdown was incorporated late in their construction. A significant improvement was made with the incorporation of French TIA, blowdown equipment which enabled rapid ejection of boiler sludge, reduced boiler scale, and enabled much faster turnaround and higher availability. The system of injection of the oil flow into the burners was different and far more effective than in the 1948–1950 conversion of 12 J class locomotives to oil burning.

Other detail differences were the use of Stone's headlights and electrical generator instead of the usual Pyle National equipment, the "Butterfly" number boards on the front headlight, and the absence of a smokebox number plate (although a smokebox plate was specified by the NZR).

=== In service ===
The North British J^{A} class were constrained to the North Island and were mostly used on routes that were commonly worked by oil-burning locomotives. Described by the author Stewart as "fine clean-lined machines", they handled almost every express train in that region for about twelve years.

The first eleven locomotives, J^{A} 1275–1285, were based in Auckland, while the other five, J^{A} 1286–1290, were initially based at Palmerston North before being moved to Napier in 1963.

The Auckland-based locomotives were regarded as specialised express engines and were more impressive performers than the K^{A} class locomotives by most Auckland engine drivers. They were regularly assigned to the North Auckland Line (NAL), the Opua Express until 1959, the Helensville local until 1966, and the North Island Main Trunk (NIMT) services, such as the Auckland–Wellington, 227/626 Express Mail train, and faster Night Limited, and Auckland–Wellington express goods train 627. There are accounts of them being used elsewhere. For instance, there are surviving accounts of J^{A} 1279 running on the Waiuku Branch in the early 1960s, and later on the Raetihi Branch during the same decade after coal-fired A^{B} 700 caused several lineside fires. When working with other 4-8-2s on the NAL, they were required to have a bogie wagon such as a UB flat wagon between them to distribute weight more evenly on the light bridges along that line.

By contrast, the five Palmerston North-based engines were less frequently assigned to the NIMT trains. Instead, they ran over the Marton - New Plymouth Line to Wanganui and the Palmerston North - Gisborne Line as far as Gisborne. By comparison, the Palmerston North-based J^{A} class spent more time working freight trains, particularly with the arrival of the 88-seater railcars.

The rest of the steam fleet, excluding the J and J^{B} classes, experienced increased mechanical failures and repair costs while moving the heavier post-war traffic on the NIMT. By 1955, the K and X classes of 4-8-2 locomotives were worn out. The 9 K class was rebuilt with K^{A} frames in 1955–57 since it was unacceptable to write off the K class locomotives and retain useful Baldwin A^{A}. The superiority of the D^{A} class diesels and J^{A} class meant that an A-grade overhaul for a K class member in 1961 turned out to be the last such work for that class.

An analysis done in 1959 found that the North British J^{A} matched the availability of the new DA class, with each J^{A} available for 252 days a year on the North Island. The cost per mile for the J^{A} was much higher, with the locomotives achieving 82% of the DA class' mileage.

After the start of dieselisation in the 1960s, the locomotives were transferred to Frankton Junction. Although J^{A} 1286 was briefly transferred to Auckland in the mid-1960s, it was felt that it did not perform as well as the eleven Auckland-based locomotives and was quickly reallocated to Frankton. After this, the locomotives were mostly assigned to the old East Coast Main Trunk Railway between Hamilton, Tauranga, and Taneatua, again largely on freight trains due to the reduction of passenger services from Taneatua to Te Puke, which was by then handled by the 88-seater railcars.

=== Withdrawal and disposal ===
Although being a relatively young class, some of the North British J^{A} members were among the first of the J types to be withdrawn. In 1964, J^{A} 1279 was the first of the class to be withdrawn and sent to Hillside Workshops without at least one driving wheelset, which was taken to repair J^{A} 1275 after it suffered an axle fracture while passing through Mercer that year. The rest of the locomotive became a source of spare parts for the J and Hillside J^{A} class locomotives in the South Island. The oil-fired boiler was converted to coal-firing before being fitted to Greymouth-based J 1212 during a C-grade overhaul.

As the locomotives were withdrawn, most of them were stripped of parts to keep the South Island J and Hillside J^{A} class locomotives running, along with the remaining North British J^{A} class which, by then, were based out of Frankton Junction.

In November 1966, tenders from J^{A} 1287, 1288, and 1290, which were in relatively good condition, were transferred south. They were rebuilt to accommodate a coal bunker in place of the fuel oil tank and coupled to J-class locomotives whose original 1939-built tenders were life-expired. Other surplus North Island J^{A} parts were also refitted, including the trailing trucks, and approval was given to fit the J^{A} 1288's boiler. Most of the North Island J^{A} was withdrawn too late in 1967 or early 1968 to be reprocessed, as A-grade South Island J overhauls had ceased with dieselisation. J^{A} 1281's boiler was refitted to J 1236 in an A-grade Hillside overhaul in 1967, with the firebox converted from oil to coal burning, but with all the oil firing fittings left in place, making it easier for restoration and reconversion to oil burning in 1991-2001 for rail excursions.

The boiler of J^{A} 1278 was withdrawn in March 1968 and installed that year in a C-grade overhaul of J^{A} 1252 in Dunedin.

Only four of the North British J^{A} class managed to reach the end of North Island steam in 1968, J^{A} 1275 being one of them. After the withdrawal and removal of all useful parts, the North British J^{A} class were sold to Sims Pacific Metal Industries and towed to Sims Otahuhu scrapyard, adjacent to the Otahuhu Workshops, for scrapping. J^{A} 1275 was the only locomotive to avoid this fate.

== Preservation ==
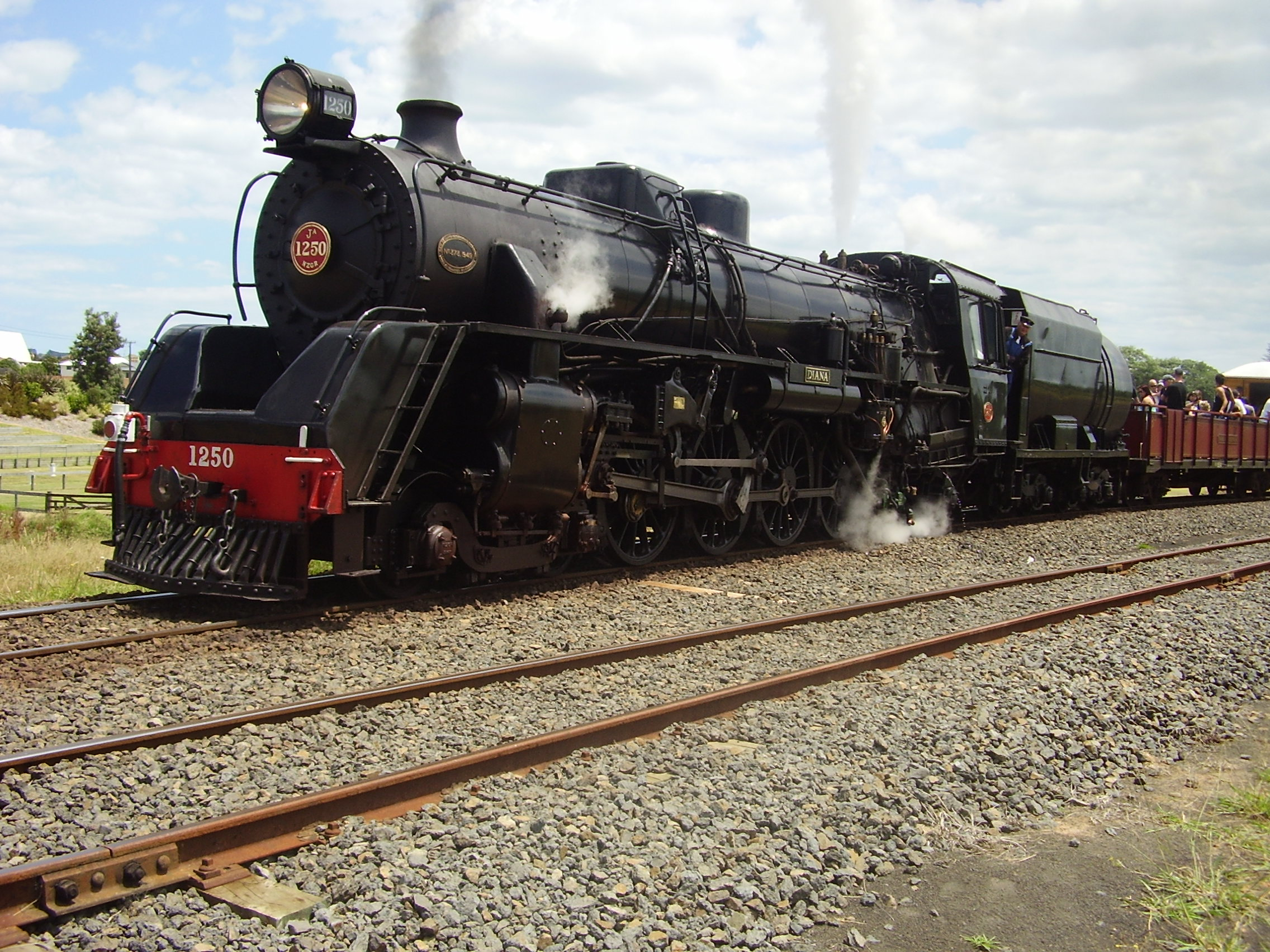
J^{A} 1250 Diana standing at Victoria Ave Station on the Glenbrook Vintage Railway

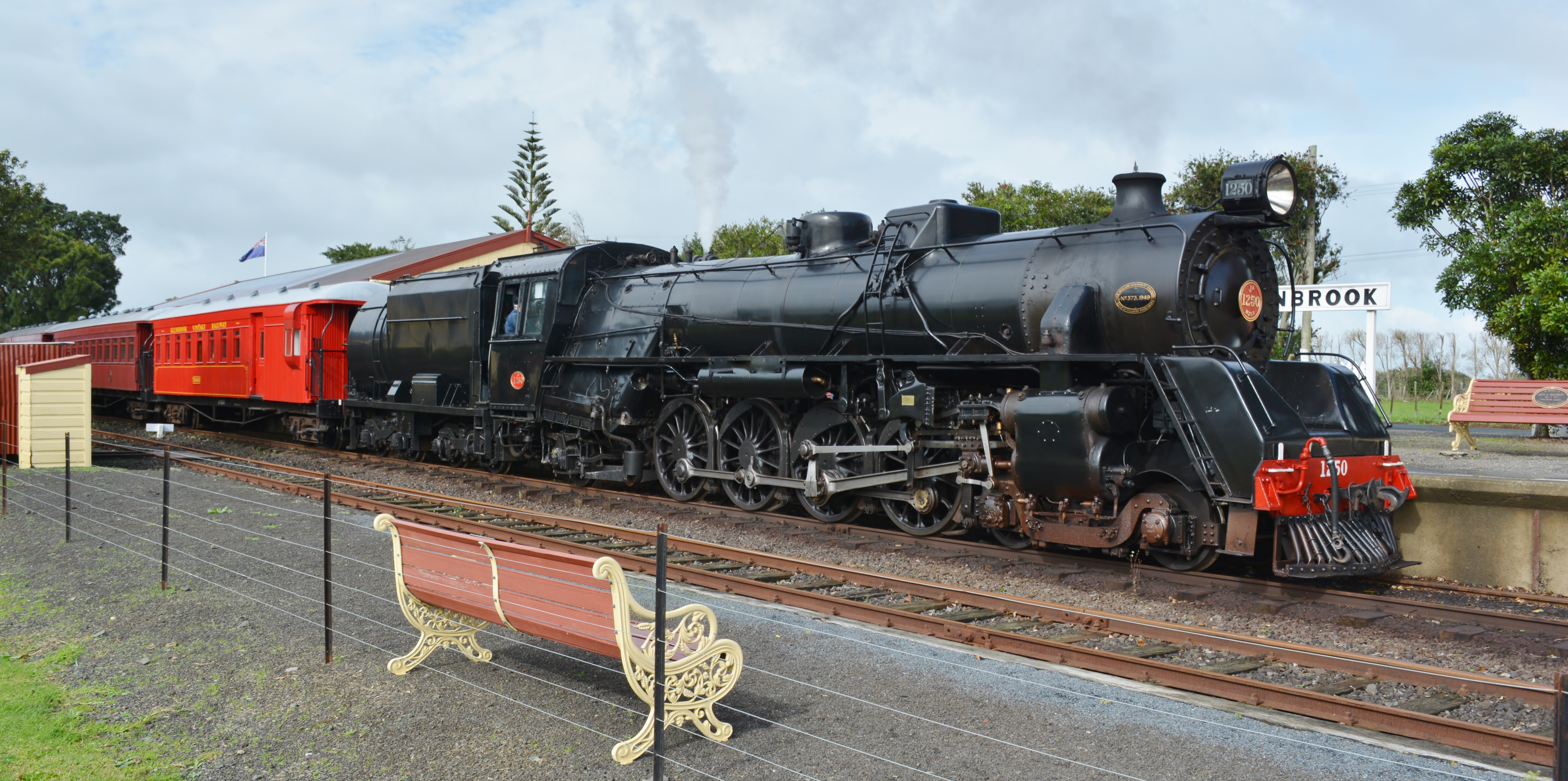
J^{A} 1250 Diana at Glenbrook Station

Six of the Hillside J^{A} class survived to be preserved; by contrast, only one North British J^{A} remains. Additionally, two preserved J-class locomotives have North British J^{A} tenders.

=== Hillside J^{A} class ===
- J^{A} 1240 "Jessica" was preserved by Blenheim man Peter Coleman, and was stored serviceable at his Blenheim property. In 1988 after his death, J^{A} 1240 was purchased by Ian Welch, and in 1990 travelled to the Mainline Steam Heritage Trust's Parnell depot. This locomotive's restoration for mainline use (as a coal burner) has been completed and is based in Christchurch. It has been named after one of owner Ian Welch's granddaughters.
- J^{A} 1250 "Diana" was preserved by the Railway Enthusiasts Society in 1972. It was used on their Steam Safari train excursions before being purchased by Phil Goldman, who renamed it after his wife, Diana. The Glenbrook Vintage Railway (GVR) restored the engine for use on their railway, and it was even used in the 1983 feature film Merry Christmas, Mr. Lawrence. In April 1985, J^{A} 1250 was selected along with another engine. K^{A} 945 to be used on the first mainline steam-hauled trip since the end of steam. After that, the locomotive traveled around the country and was a notable presence at the 1988 Rail 125 celebrations. Between 1994 and 1998, J^{A} 1250 underwent a substantial overhaul and returned to mainline and GVR service. From 2006, its mainline certification lapsed, and it was restricted to use on the GVR. In April 2011, the locomotive was re-certified for mainline running and made its return to the main line with a doubleheader from Glenbrook to Hamilton alongside J^{A} 1271. After two more years of mainline running, Diana retired to the GVR for the remainder of her boiler ticket. On Auckland Anniversary Weekend in 2017, a Farewell Weekend was held for the engine, and it continued to operate for another four months before its last day in service on April 30, 2017. The locomotive is now undergoing an overhaul.
- J^{A} 1260 was preserved by the Ashburton Railway and Preservation Society in May 1972. The locomotive was used on the Plains Railway's line for a short time before being leased to the Weka Pass Railway for a year in 1986. After being returned to Plains, J^{A} 1260 was dismantled for an overhaul. The overhaul was delayed due to other pressing projects. In 2007, the work began and J^{A} 1260 was back in service on the railway in May 2008. It is worth noting that J^{A} 1260 is the only preserved member of the class that operates at a lower boiler pressure of 180 psi instead of 200 psi. This was done because of the limited nature of operations at The Plains Vintage Railway & Historical Museum.
- J^{A} 1267 was preserved by a syndicate and stored at the Te Awamutu Railway Museum at Te Awamutu in 1972. It remained on static display under a rudimentary shelter until 2008 when it was put up for auction due to the winding up of the museum and discord amongst the syndicate. Ian Welch purchased the locomotive and transferred it to the Mainline Steam Heritage Trust's Parnell depot. It is currently stored there, awaiting eventual overhaul to mainline running.
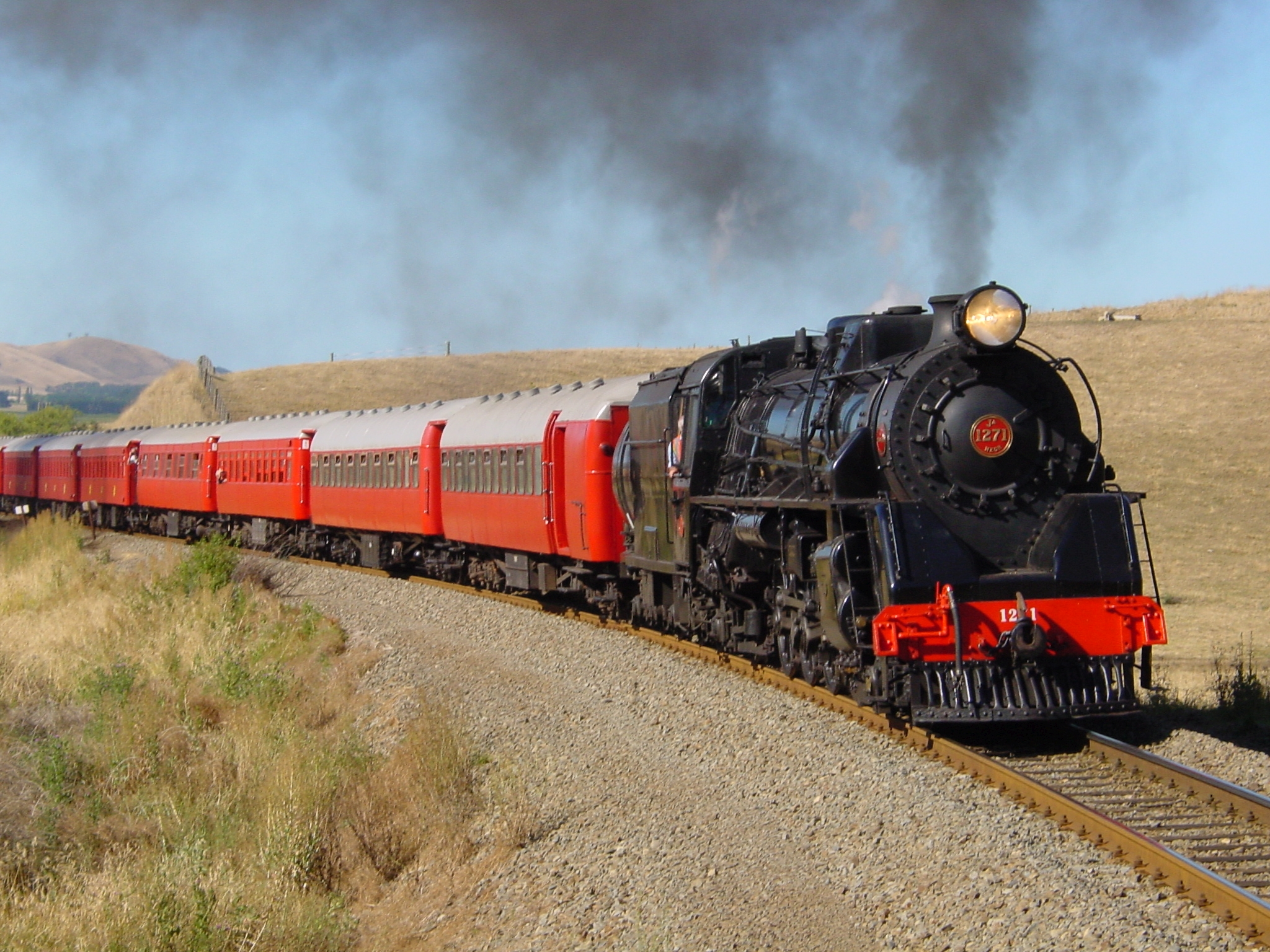
- JA1271 with excursion consist climbing the Te Aute bank in 2003
  J^{A} 1271 was preserved by Reid McNaught and Russell Gibbard in 1978. At the time of purchase, the locomotive was incomplete and in bad condition, having been used as a stationary boiler plant since 1970 after a motion failure. It was then taken to Steam Incorporated's Paekakariki base for a comprehensive restoration to mainline running. In October 1997, it made its debut with a tour of the South Island, before returning north where it became a very active mainline locomotive. It played a significant role in hauling the 2003 50th Anniversary Commemoration train of the Tangiwai disaster and the 100th Anniversary of the Parliamentary Special.
- J^{A} 1274 was preserved by the New Zealand Railway and Locomotive Society Otago branch in 1971. It was placed on display in a specially erected shelter at the Otago Settlers Museum in 1974 and remained on display there until 2011. Later, a new shelter was built for its display closer to the station building. There are no plans for restoring this locomotive to its working order.

=== North British J^{A} class ===
- J^{A} 1275 "Julie Anne" was preserved by Les Hostick in 1967 and stored at the Te Awamutu Railway Museum at Te Awamutu, 1972. The locomotive was stored with B^{B} 144 at the Te Awamutu Railway Museum in 1972 and remained on static display under a rudimentary shelter until 1994 when it was leased to Ian Welch. The locomotive was then transferred to the Mainline Steam Heritage Trust's Parnell depot for restoration to mainline running condition. The restoration work began in 2001 and was completed in September 2004, after which J^{A} 1275 returned to the mainline.
