= NZR J class (1939) =

20th-century steam locomotives

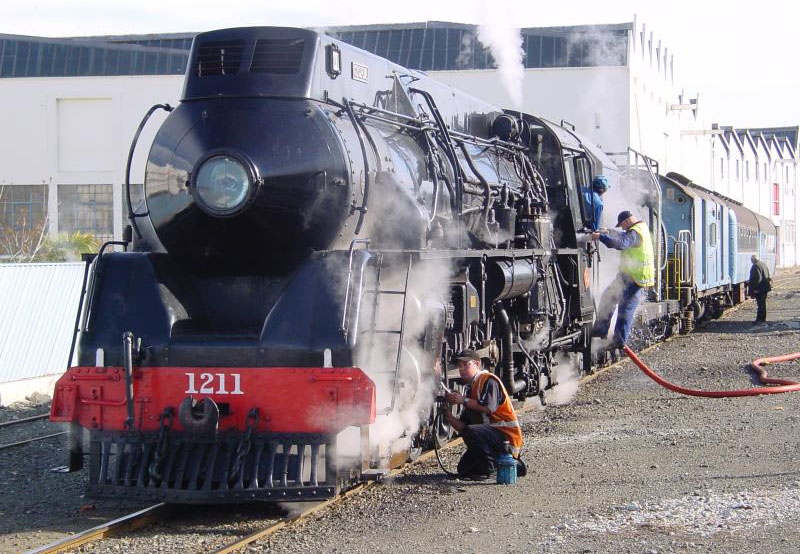
- J 1211 being serviced before departure from Napier in October 2002.
Type and origin
- Power type: Steam
- Builder: North British Locomotive Company, Scotland
- Serial number: 24523–24562
- Build date: 1939
Specifications
- Configuration
  - Whyte: 4-8-2
- Gauge: 3 ft 6 in (1,067 mm)
- Wheel diameter: 54 in (1.372 m)
- Wheelbase: 34 ft 10 in (10.62 m)
- Length: 66 ft 11 in (20.40 m)
- Adhesive weight: 44.45 long tons (45.16 t; 49.78 short tons)
- Loco weight: 68.55 long tons (69.65 t; 76.78 short tons)
- Tender weight: 40.35 long tons (41.00 t; 45.19 short tons)
- Total weight: 108.9 long tons (110.6 t; 122.0 short tons)
- Fuel type: Coal (J). Oil (J^{B}) (Note: Oil-burning J class locomotives were classified J^{B}. Restored J class locomotive 1211 Gloria originally burned coal, but was converted to oil-burning during restoration. Oil capacity is 1,350 imp gal (6,100 L; 1,620 US gal).)
- Fuel capacity: 6.0 long tons (6.1 t; 6.7 short tons)
- Water cap.: 4,000 imp gal (18,000 L; 4,800 US gal)
- Firebox
  - Grate area: 39.0 square feet (3.6 m^{2})
- Boiler pressure: 200 psi (1,400 kPa)
- Heating surface: 1,469 square feet (136.5 m^{2})
- Superheater
  - Heating area: 283 square feet (26.3 m^{2})
- Cylinders: 2
- Cylinder size: 18 in × 26 in (457 mm × 660 mm)
- Valve gear: Baker
Performance figures
- Tractive effort: 24,960 lbf (111.0 kN)
Career
- Number in class: 40
- Numbers: 1200 - 1239
- Locale: All of New Zealand
- First run: 1939 - 1940
- Last run: 1964 - 1967
- Retired: 1964 - 1971
- Scrapped: 1969 - 1971
- Current owner: Ian Welch, Steam Incorporated
- Disposition: Three preserved, twelve rebuilt as J^{B} class, remainder scrapped.

The NZR J class was a class of forty 4-8-2 steam locomotives operated by the New Zealand Railways Department (NZR). Although designed to work on the lighter secondary lines, the class was frequently used on mainline express passenger trains as well as freight. When first introduced, the class boasted distinctive streamlining, which was later removed from 1947 onwards for maintenance reasons. Three of this class remained in service until the end of steam operation on 26 October 1971, when they were withdrawn and entered into preservation. This class should not be confused with the earlier J class from 1874.

== Introduction ==
The J class was primarily designed to be a mixed traffic locomotive that was more powerful than the A^{B} class, being capable of running on the lighter secondary lines while also being able to operate express passenger trains on main routes, which were at the time operated by the larger K class locomotives and the in-production K^{A} and K^{B} classes.

The order, initially to be for 30 locomotives, was placed overseas with Britain despite criticism, because of the urgency of the requirement and the limited capacity of the NZR Workshops. As the NZR workshops were already busy with the production of the K^{A}s and K^{B}s, the North British Locomotive Company was commissioned to build 40 of these locomotives.

The J class incorporated several similar features with the contemporaneous K^{A} and K^{B} classes, such as roller bearing axles, hydrostatic lubrication, and twin Westinghouse brake pumps. They utilised bar frames instead of plate frames and were equipped with Baker Valve gear instead of Walschaerts. They also featured a Vanderbilt tender and were outshopped with distinctive bullet-nosed streamlining that bore a resemblance to the later Norfolk and Western Railway J class from 1941 and the NSWGR 38 class from 1943.

== In service ==
In the early days, the first 30 of the class were allocated to the North Island, while the last 10 were assigned to the South Island to be used on the hilly section between Dunedin and Oamaru. They were immediately put into service on the main trunk routes in both islands to help transport wartime traffic during World War II.

Aside from being used on freight trains, these locomotives were highly suited for high-speed running on the passenger trains of that era. Due to the circumstances brought about by the war, the streamlining became burdensome for maintenance. Also, the skyline casing, which was fitted at the top of the boiler, proved to be a trap for soot from the locomotive's exhaust. Consequently, these began to be removed from some examples of the class, leaving them with just the bullet nose.

The design of the J class was considered a success, prompting NZR to build an improved version, the J^{A} class, at the Hillside workshops starting in 1946. By 1950, enough J^{A} class locomotives had been introduced into service, allowing ten J class locomotives based in the South Island to be transferred to the North Island and join the rest of the class members. At this time, the locomotives lost their streamlining, either completely during overhaul or after the skyline casing had already been removed. Only the bullet nose was retained, with the headlight moved to the same position as that adopted by the J^{A} class. Around this time, some of the J class locomotives had the twin Westinghouse pumps removed in favor of the Cross-compound pump used by the J^{A} class. Not every J-class locomotive was fitted with this feature.

== J^{B} class ==
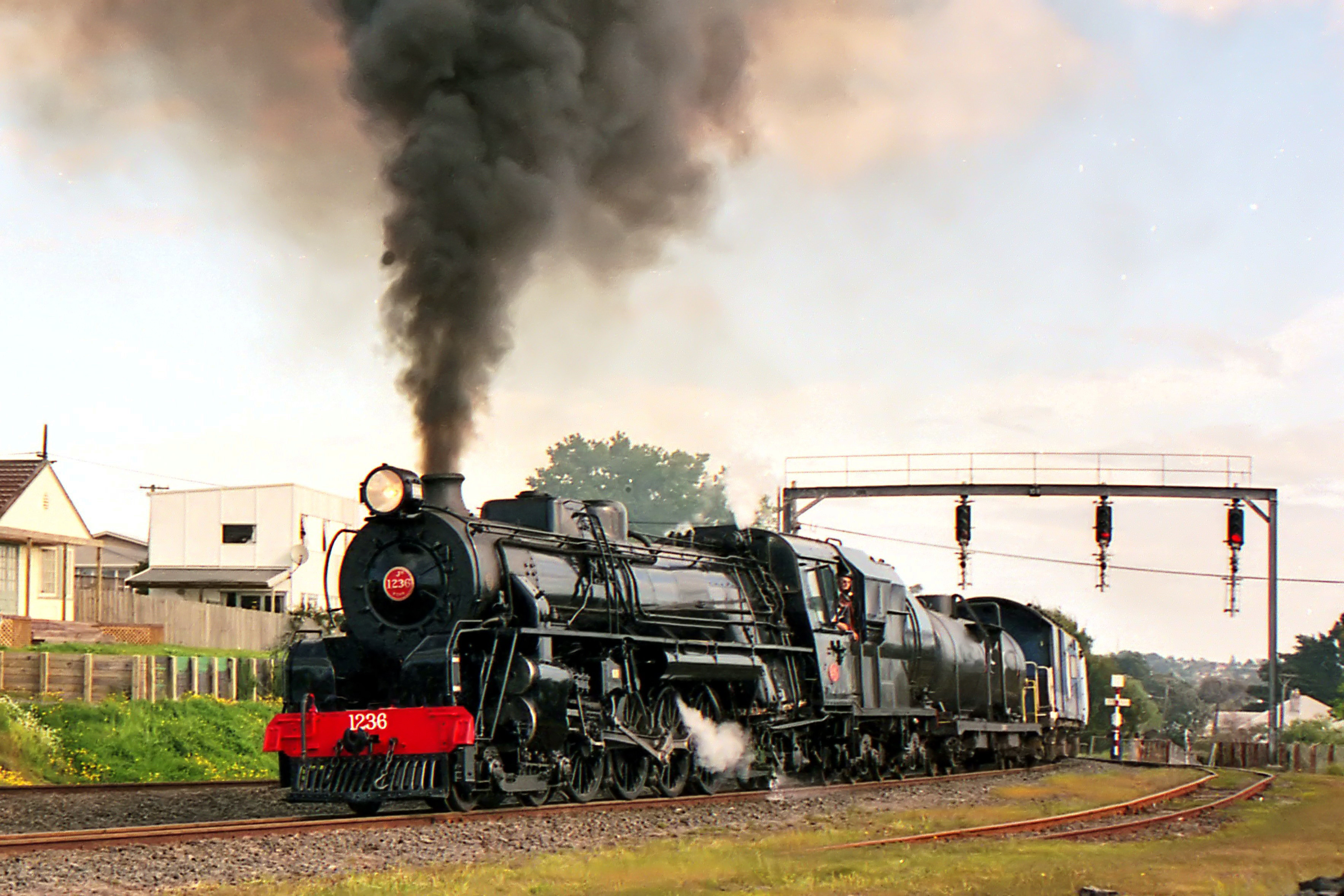
J^{B} 1236 (converted during preservation) in Avondale on 22 September 2001.

After World War II, the railways in New Zealand faced problematic coal shortages, particularly in the North Island. To address this issue, twelve members of the J class were converted into oil burners as heavy fuel oil was abundantly available at that time.

The conversion process involved installing a two-nozzle burner in the firebox, removing the grate and ashpan, and replacing them with a firepan lined with bricks. Additionally, the superheater tubes in the boiler were shortened, the spark arrester in the smokebox was removed, and the brick arch was taken out. The conversion also required the addition of related controls and gauges for the oil-burning equipment, and modifications to their Vanderbilt tenders to carry an oil bunker and associated steam piping. Similar to the K and K^{A} classes that were also converted to oil burners at that time, these tenders utilised a separate, removable tank that sat in the former coal space. The full-width coal bunker was cut down so that the oil tank was visible at the sides, with distinctive vertical supports below. The conversion process generally coincided with the removal of the streamlining, but not always.

Once converted, the locomotives were re-classified as J^{B}, but they retained their original J class numbers. Although the locomotives performed well, they did not distinguish themselves above the unconverted J class or any of the other J class variants. Some received cross-compound Westinghouse pumps in place of the twin single-phase pumps, but others did not. They only ever saw service in the North Island since coal supplies were abundant in the South Island. Some years after the conversion to oil, the fuel oil became considerably more expensive than the coal supplies that were then sourced, and there was no longer a coal shortage. Nevertheless, the conversion back to coal burning did not occur due to objections from the various railway unions.

== Withdrawal and disposal ==
Several locomotives of the J^{B} class were among the first J 4-8-2 types to be withdrawn due to faster wear and tear resulting from oil burning. Of the North Island J locomotives, the last of the J^{B}s were withdrawn by December 1967, while 4 of the J^{A}s remained in reserve until March 1968, when they were stripped for reusable parts in the South Island, including boilers. The coal-burning J class lasted longer in service, with the last three members of the class receiving A-grade overhauls at Hillside in 1967. North Island J^{A} boilers were approved for refitting to the J class in mid and late that year.

In 1964, J 1212, one of the West Coast J class locomotives, was reboilered with the boiler taken from the first North Island J^{A} to be withdrawn. The last three J's to receive A-grade overhauls in 1967 were 1211 (reboilered with a spare North British J^{A} boiler supplied in 1953, which had been used on J^{B} 1230 from 1959 until it was scrapped in 1964), J's 1234, and 1236. These locomotives were frequently used on the South Island Limited in 1968 and 1969, on train 143 out of Christchurch and train 144 return of the Oamaru-Christchurch leg. They continued to be used until November 1970, when diesel-hauled Southerner replaced them. These locomotives were also used on the twice-weekly overnight weekend, a passenger and fast freight combined service, which required longer than scheduled stops for freight shunting and mail handling.

By mid-1970, only J^{A} 1267 remained in good condition, with three J and two other J^{A} class locomotives in acceptable condition. The number of A-grade overhauls intended to cover four years of J/J^{A} operation by the end of 1967 should easily have covered the requirements of the South Island Limited by the end of 1970. Still, after the end of steam-hauled general freight in the South Island of New Zealand in April 1969, general maintenance and resources were significantly reduced. The delayed arrival of the North Island Silver Star carriages from Japan by a year meant that steam heat vans, which allowed diesel to operate night trains, would not be available until late 1971. Half a dozen other J^{A} class remained usable, but in dubious condition for use on the weekend 189/190 trains until the end of steam on 26 October 1971.

== Preservation ==
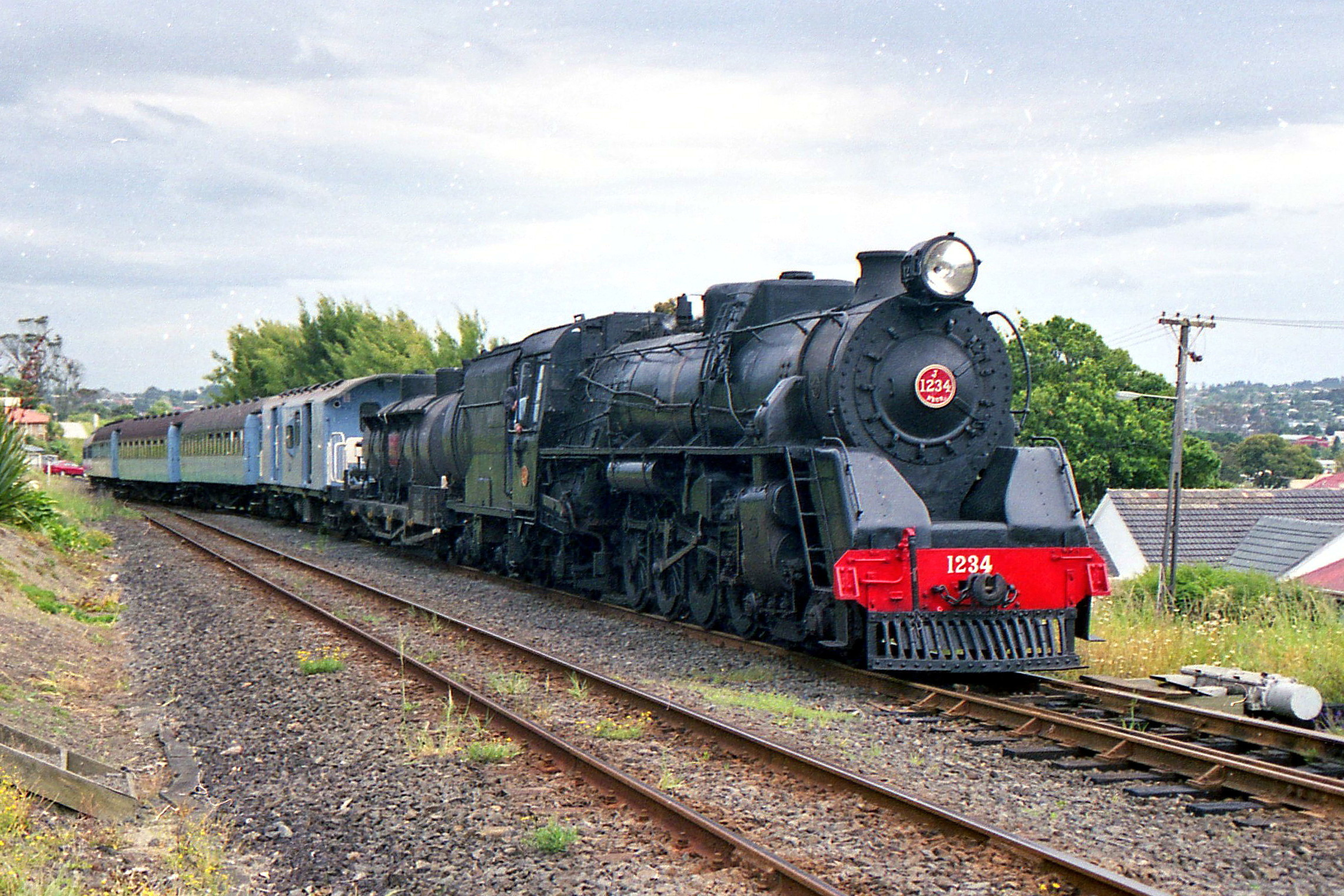
J 1234 in Avondale, Auckland on 6 December 1998.

Three of the J-class locomotives have been preserved:

- J 1211 "Gloria" was purchased by Ian Welch, Russell Gibbard, and Reid McNaught in 1972 for use by the railway heritage and preservation society Steam Incorporated, and later was bought outright by Ian Welch. After use on the Bay of Islands Vintage Railway in 1985, it was moved to the Glenbrook Vintage Railway for an overhaul to mainline running. It was first used on mainline excursions during the Ferrymead 125 event in October 1988, where it debuted in imitation of the original streamlining the class wore. Becoming the first operational locomotive of Mainline Steam, the locomotive saw use in both Islands hauling excursions. It was converted to oil firing in 1995/1996 in the same manner as the J^{B} class, with the oil bunker being re-instated in the North British J^{A} oil tender which this steam locomotive has been preserved with. The locomotive is named "Gloria" after owner Ian Welch's wife. It underwent a boiler overhaul from 2013 to 2018 and returned to service in December 2018. In 2025 J 1211 was returned to the Mainline Steam Plimmerton Depot.
- J 1234 was purchased by Steam Incorporated in 1972. Arriving at the society's Paekakariki base in 1974, it was kept in serviceable condition until February 1992 when it was certified for use on the mainline network. In April 1998, it was leased to the Glenbrook Vintage Railway and was used there until 2003. Afterwards, it was stored and awaited its return to Paekakariki in June 2015. The locomotive was finally returned in 2016 and is currently in storage awaiting an eventual overhaul.
- J^{B} 1236 "Joanne" was purchased by the Railway Enthusiasts Society for use with J^{A} 1250 on its "South Pacific Steam Safari" tour, making use of the fact that New Zealand Railways only allowed steam locomotives to be used on delivery trips after the end of steam. After the trip, Mr. P. Bulcher bought the locomotive, and it was moved to the Museum of Transport and Technology in Auckland, where it was displayed alongside K 900. In 1988, Ian Welch of Mainline Steam bought the locomotive and moved it to the group's Parnell depot. Mainline Steam restored it as a J^{B} class oil burner, even though it had been a coal-burning J class during its entire NZR career. It returned to the mainline in May 2001 and was initially based in Auckland, but it was then transferred to Christchurch in October 2004. In November 2011, it was moved to the group's Plimmerton depot for an overhaul and returned to service in May 2017 with some non-prototypical features. The locomotive is named "Joanne" after one of owner Ian Welch's daughters.

None of the original J^{B} class locomotives have been preserved, although a tender from J^{B} 1203 is currently held by Steam Incorporated.
