= NZR KB class =

NZR K^{B} class
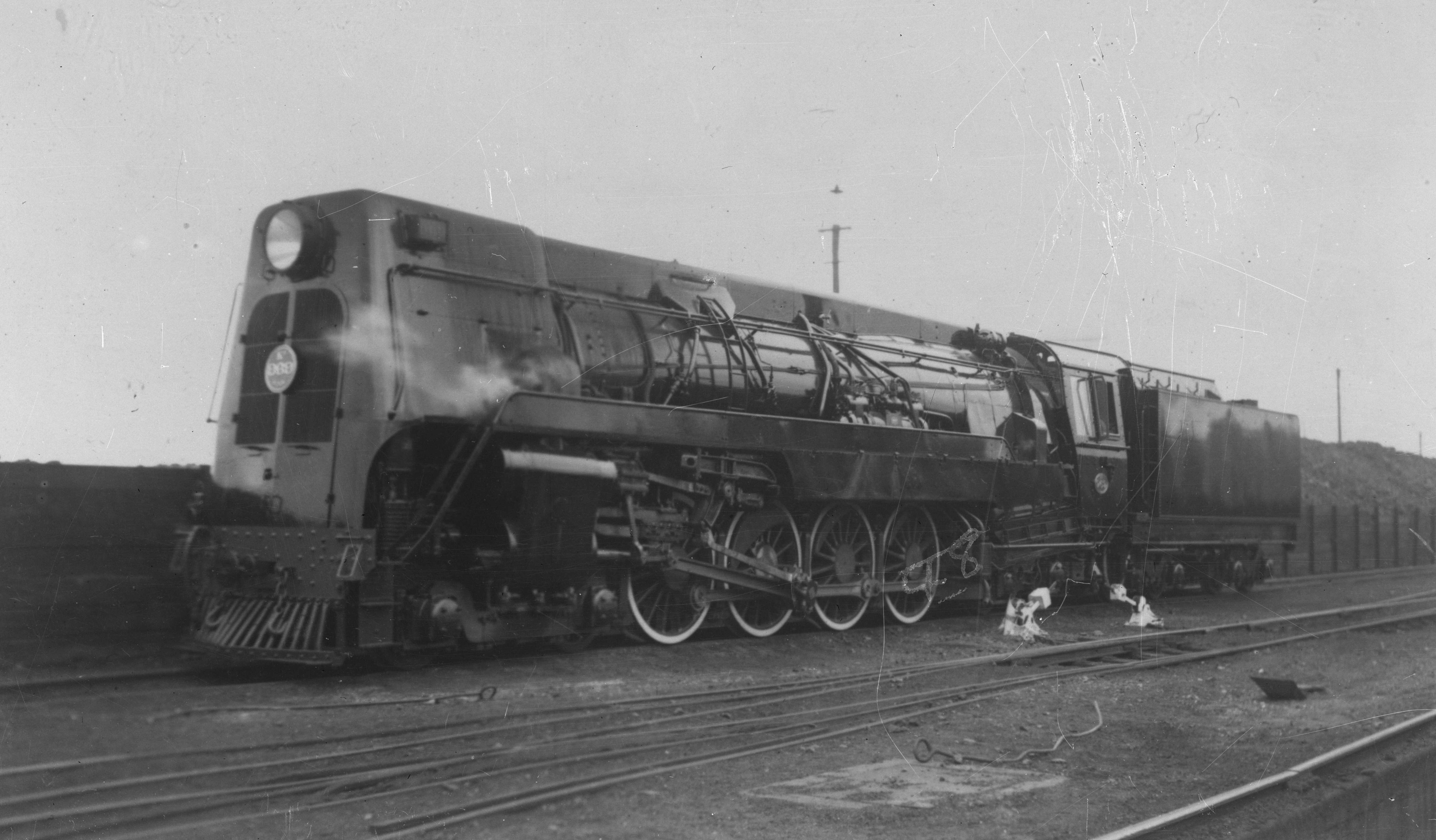
- K^{B} class 4-8-4 steam locomotive, NZR number 969, c. 1940 at Hillside Workshops in Dunedin. Godber Collection, Alexander Turnbull Library.
Type and origin
- Power type: Steam
- Builder: NZR Hillside Workshops, Dunedin
- Build date: 1939
- Total produced: 6
Specifications
- Configuration
  - Whyte: 4-8-4
- Gauge: 3 ft 6 in (1,067 mm)
- Wheel diameter: 54 in (1.372 m)
- Wheelbase: 34 ft 10 in (10.62 m)
- Length: 69 ft 8 in (21.23 m)
- Width: 8 ft 6 in (2.59 m)
- Height: 11 ft 6 in (3.51 m)
- Adhesive weight: 56.0 long tons (56.9 t; 62.7 short tons)
- Loco weight: 94.8 long tons (96.3 t; 106.2 short tons)
- Tender weight: 52.9 long tons (53.7 t; 59.2 short tons)
- Total weight: 147.7 long tons (150.1 t; 165.4 short tons)
- Fuel type: Coal
- Fuel capacity: 7.5 long tons (7.6 t; 8.4 short tons)
- Water cap.: 5,000 imp gal (23,000 L; 6,000 US gal)
- Firebox
  - Grate area: 47.7 sq ft (4.4 m^{2})
- Boiler pressure: 200 psi (1,379 kPa)
- Feedwater heater: ACFI
- Heating surface: 1,984 sq ft (184.3 m^{2})
- Superheater
  - Heating area: 485 sq ft (45.1 m^{2})
- Cylinders: 2 driving 2 booster
- Cylinder size: 20 in × 26 in (508 mm × 660 mm)
Performance figures
- Power output: 1,400 hp (1,000 kW)
- Tractive effort: 30,815 lbf (137.07 kN); 36,815 lbf (163.76 kN) with booster
Career
- Number in class: 6
- Numbers: 965 - 970
- Locale: South Island of New Zealand, mainly the Midland line
- First run: 1939 - 1940
- Last run: December 1968
- Retired: 1967 - 1969
- Current owner: Ferrymead Trust, leased to Mainline Steam
- Disposition: Withdrawn; 1 preserved

The NZR K^{B} class of 1939 was a class of six mixed traffic steam locomotives built for New Zealand Railways Department (NZR), that operated on New Zealand's railway network. After the success of the K class, the K^{B} class were built to meet the increasing traffic demands on the Midland Line in the South Island. The locomotives had a wheel arrangement of 4-8-4 and first appeared with distinctive streamlining, mainly to hide their ACFI feedwater systems.

== History ==
Following the success of the K class in the North Island, there was a need for similar locomotives to operate the Midland Line, primarily between Springfield and Arthur's Pass. These new locomotives incorporated a number of improvements upon the K class, including a re-designed plate frame to eliminate cracking issues the K class experienced; roller bearings on all wheels; hydrostatic lubrication throughout; and the inclusion of the ACFI feed-water system that had been pioneered on K 919. The ACFI equipment's aesthetic appearance had been criticised, hence the K^{B} and contemporary K^{A} classes were both fitted with shrouding to obscure it.

The K^{B} class were technically very similar to the K^{A} class, but were distinguished by the inclusion of a booster engine on the rear axle of the trailing bogie and Nicholson thermic syphons in the firebox. The use of the booster, first proposed for the K class in 1932, was mainly due to steeper gradients and heavy freight trains on the Midland Line, especially Cass bank. Additional piping and sanding equipment for the booster gave the K^{B} a slightly different appearance to the K^{A}. The booster was intended solely for use at low speed, and some class members ultimately had the booster removed due to problems such as jamming in gear, reducing the locomotive's top speed.

Construction of the locomotives commenced in 1939. Construction and assembly took place at NZR's Hillside Workshops. The first of the six-member class was produced before the first of the K^{A} class under construction at Hutt Workshops, in June 1939. All of the class were in service by 1940.

== In service ==
As intended, the K^{B} class were based solely in the South Island and performed most of their work hauling freight trains on the Midland Line. During the Second World War, they were also used on the Main South Line.

While the aesthetic shrouding cleaned up the appearance of the locomotives, it was open at the top and gathered soot and dust which affected the working environment in the cab. After the war, the aesthetic shrouding was removed from the locomotives and the ACFI feed-water system was replaced with exhaust steam injector.

Although the K and K^{A} classes were converted to burn oil at the same time, the K^{B} class remained as coal burners due to the availability of high grade West Coast coal.

== Withdrawal and disposal ==
Table of withdrawals
| Year | Quantity in service at start of year | Quantity withdrawn | Locomotive numbers | Notes |
|---|---|---|---|---|
| 1967 | 6 | 2 | 966, 969. | |
| 1968 | 4 | 2 | 967, 970. | |
| 1969 | 2 | 2 | 965, 968 | 968 Preserved. |

From the mid-1950s, dieselisation impacted the use of the K^{B} class. With the introduction of diesel railcars in the 1950s, the class stopped hauling passenger trains. This became especially pronounced in the 1960s, and the introduction of the DJ class in 1968 brought about their ultimate demise. As they were displaced from duties in the late 1960s, some members were used on the Main South Line, including hauling the South Island Limited.

The first withdrawals were K^{B}'s 966 and 969 in October 1967; both were cut up for scrap. K^{B} 969 was withdrawn after hauling the only ever double-headed K^{B} train, having suffered a cracked motion bracket. Before it was sent to the breakers' yard, it was inscribed with a message reading "Good-bye, Kb969, and you'll come back as roofing iron".

K^{B} 967 was withdrawn from service in October 1968. This left only three K^{B}'s in service (965, 968 and 970), and of those, only Kb's 968 and 970 were still used regularly while Kb965 was kept as a standby spare locomotive from July 1968 onwards; with the remaining two being withdrawn from service in March 1969. Kb970 was scrapped in late March 1968, while Kb968 made its last long journey on 22 June 1969, hauling a railway enthusiast's excursion from Christchurch to Arthur's Pass and return, and Kb965 was scrapped in late September 1969.

== Preservation ==
NZR donated members of the K and K^{A} classes for preservation, but due to the considerable technical similarities, it chose not to donate a K^{B}. Instead, enthusiasts purchased one at the scrap market rate of NZ$1500 (equal to $22,200 in December 2008 dollars). K^{B} 968 was supposed to be cut up the week following its last excursion, but a collection on the return journey was sufficient to temporarily save the locomotive. Retired school teacher Cyril Evans raised the rest of the $1,500 by showing railway films to Christchurch school children and collecting their donations. The locomotive was then vested into the Ferrymead Heritage Trust on behalf of the children of Canterbury and was displayed for a number of decades at the Ferrymead Railway. It is currently under restoration to mainline operating condition at Mainline Steam's Wellington depot.
