= Mainline Steam Heritage Trust =

New Zealand steam locomotive and historic railway trust

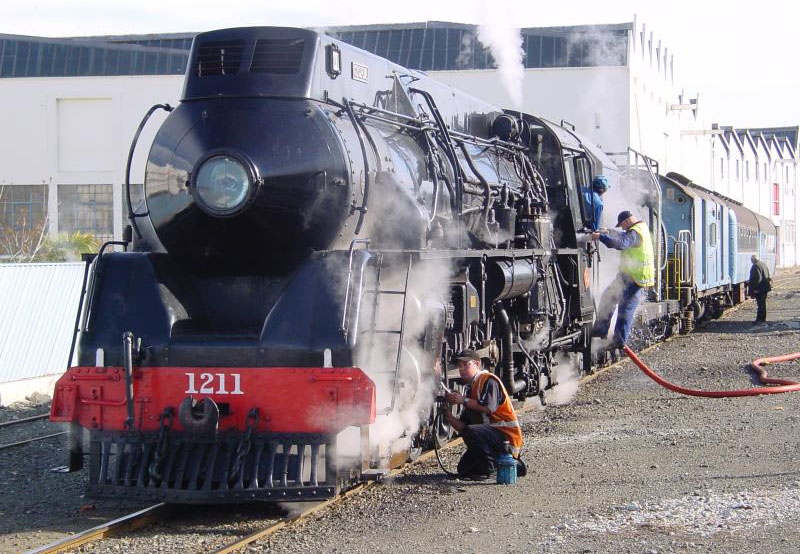
Auckland based J 1211

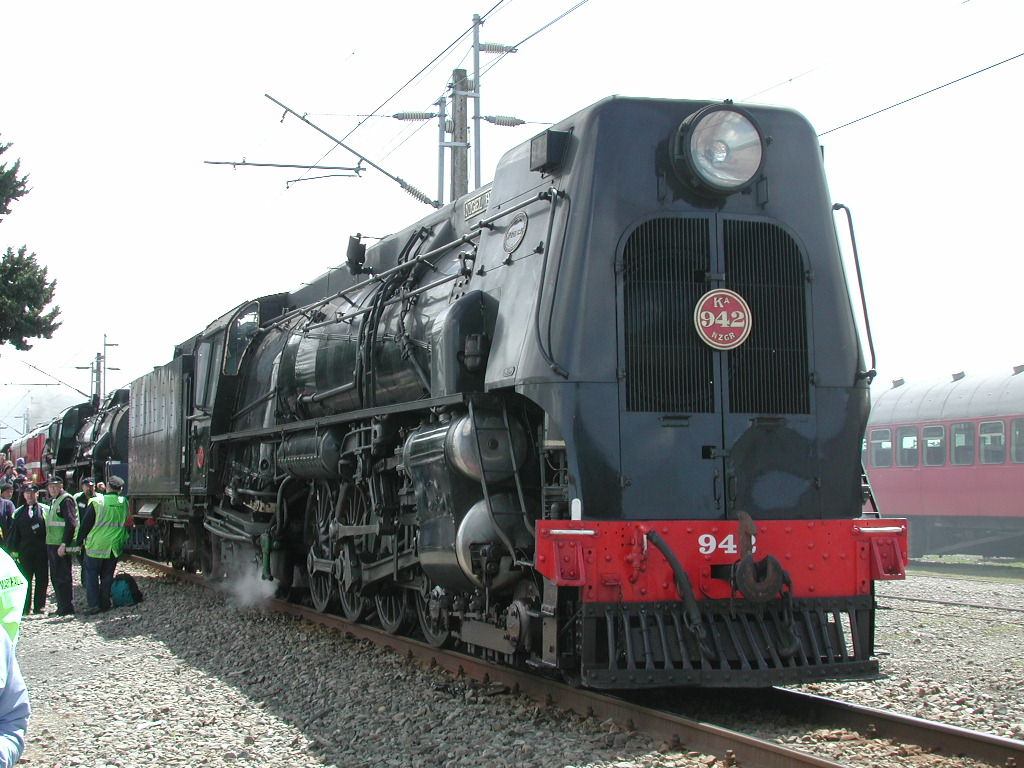
K^{A} 942 at the 100-year anniversary of the North Island Main Trunk railway in Feilding being lined up for a locomotive cavalcade.

The Mainline Steam Heritage Trust is a New Zealand charitable trust devoted to the restoration and operation of historic New Zealand Railways and overseas mainline steam locomotives. Regular day excursions and multi-day tours are operated over railway lines throughout New Zealand. Excursions are operated by the Auckland, Wellington and Christchurch branches.

== About ==
The Trust began in October 1988 after the Ferrymead 125 events in Christchurch. Based around the collection of steam locomotives that were privately owned by Ian Welch, the first of which had just begun operating on the mainline with J 1211 with an excursion to Timaru and Arthurs Pass double-heading with the Glenbrook Vintage Railway's J^{A} 1250.

Depots operated by the Mainline Steam Trust included Parnell, (Auckland) Middleton and later Plimmerton. The Auckland depot used to be based in the former Parnell diesel depot. It was in the past the organisation's primary restoration base and most of Mainline Steam's currently active locomotives were restored there. It was closed in June 2015. Mainline Steam are developing a new depot at Mercer.

The Wellington depot, located at Plimmerton, is a purpose-built building that replaced the formerly leased Upper Hutt goods shed. It has now become the primary restoration base for the organisation. The depot in Christchurch is a former industrial building that used to be located at Studholme, it was relocated to land on the premises of CWF Hamilton. As of 2021, the trust was given notice to vacate the current Christchurch depot and is now building a new site at Midland Rail Heritage Trust's own lines and land in Springfield.

Mainline Steam is notable for having imported a number of African steam locomotives from South Africa and Zimbabwe (including a GMA/M Garratt), with more South African locomotives still overseas. It has also imported former British Rail Mark 2 carriages for use on its steam-hauled excursions and is in the process of overhauling them for New Zealand use. The organisation regularly operates excursions out of Auckland and Christchurch, the latter operating excursions primarily along the highly scenic Midland Line. Mainline Steam also has a number of diesel and electric locomotives in its care.

== Heritage locomotives ==
Key:	In service	In service, Main Line-certified	Under overhaul/Restoration	Stored	Static display	Scrapped

Original Class and Number.	Builder	Builders Number	Year built	Arrived	Current Depot	Notes
J 1211	North British Locomotive Works	24534	1939	1972	Plimmerton	First ever Mainline Steam Locomotive, saved from scrap in 1982 and restored to mainline operation in 1988. Was stored at the Glenbrook Vintage Railway after the Parnell Depot closed down. Relocated to the Mainline Plimmerton Depot July 2025.
K^{A} 942	NZR Hutt Workshops	325/1940	1940	1972	Plimmerton	Sits at Plimmerton in Storage, however still Mainline Capable, to move to Springfield once a new site is built. First K^{A} to ever run a train in the South Island, Mainline Steam's second locomotive. Originally streamlined, however that was removed in briefly in the 1990s and 2010 and put back on within the next 2–3 years.
J^{A} 1240	NZR Hillside Workshops		1947	1991	Plimmerton	Stored at Plimmerton, to move to Springfield once a new site is built.
J^{B} 1236	North British Locomotive Works	24559	1939	1988	Plimmerton	Started life as a J class locomotive, J 1236 and later converted in preservation to oil burning so became J^{B} 1236.
D^{J} 1229	Mitsubishi Heavy Industries	1229	1968	1990	Plimmerton	Purchased with sister locomotive D^{J} 1228, restored to working condition.
B^{A} 552	NZR Addington Workshops	148	1912	1994	Mercer	Stored awaiting restoration
A^{B} 663	NZGR Addington Workshops	188	1917	1983	Plimmerton	Stored at Plimmerton
Bagnall 1	WG Bagnall	2475	1932	1994	MOTAT	Located at MOTAT's Western Springs Railway at the MOTAT 2, Meola Road Site. Until mid 2025, was used at the Glenbrook Vintage Railway as a locomotive for the railway's Day Out with Thomas events.
J^{A} 1275	North British Locomotive Works	27104	1951	1994	Mercer	Stored
J^{A} 1267	NZR Hillside Workshops		1950	2008	Mercer	Currently in storage awaiting eventual overhaul
K 911	NZR Hutt Workshops		1932	1992	Plimmerton	Used as stationary boiler at Hutt Workshops, with K 917 and K 921. Purchased by Ian Welch 1992. Currently located at Mainline Steam's Plimmerton Depot, awaiting restoration to working order. Will have a K-style funnel but a K^{A}-style headlamp.
B^{B} 144	A & G Price		1917	1994	Mercer	Was under overhaul when the Parnell depot was closed
K^{B} 968	NZR Hillside Workshops		1939	1995	Plimmerton	Was under overhaul when the Christchurch depot was closed down. Still under overhaul, transported to Plimmerton in Wellington where work will continue until a shed is built at Springfield.
New Zealand E^{W} 1805	Robert Stephenson and Hawthorns		1951	2005	Plimmerton	

== Overseas locomotives ==
In addition to their core fleet of New Zealand locomotives, Mainline Steam owns a number of ex-South African and Zimbabwean locomotives. Four are stored in South Africa at Bloemfontein. Several engines have been shipped to the Auckland and Wellington depots. It is anticipated that some will not be shipped to New Zealand, but remain in South Africa. The locomotives at Waterval Boven have reverted to the THF and are expected to be scrapped.

Key:	In service	In service, Main Line-certified	Under overhaul/Restoration	Stored	Static display	Scrapped

Original Class and Number	Builder	Builders Number	Year built	Arrived	Current Depot	Notes
14A 509	Beyer, Peacock & Company	7582	1953	30 December 2007	Plimmerton	Purchased from the National Railways of Zimbabwe by Unicem Zimbabwe in 1994 and reclassified as their No.2. Out of service by July 2000. Purchased by Ian Welch in 2001 it received a running gear overhaul in Bulawayo from 2002 to 2004. In 2004 after being tested in steam, it was moved to the Bulawayo Railway Museum for storage while shipping to New Zealand was arranged. It was then dismantled and arrived in Napier on 30 December 2007 with 19D 2695. In August 2014 it was confirmed that its restoration to main line operating condition would commence in September of that year. Due to be recommissioned after an extensive rebuild to meet New Zealand loading and rail gauge standards, conversion to air braking and oil firing, Tire turning, a full boiler examination and re-tube. It received a New Zealand boiler ticket in July 2017 but it has not yet steamed (February 2024)
15F 2976	Beyer, Peacock & Company	7092	1944			After being withdrawn from the South African Railways it was placed into storage in Bloemfontein, South Africa. It was then sold to United Portland Cement. It was then on-sold to Ian Welch, restored to operating condition and is stored at Bloemfontein when not in use.
15F 2909	Henschel & Son	23932	1938			Ex-South African Railways. Leased by Ian Welch in South Africa given a Loan agreement to Mainline Steam by Transnet, the Loco is stored at Waterval Boven Loco Depot and at present will remain in South Africa. .
15F 2985	Beyer, Peacock & Company	7100	1944			Ex-South African Railways. Leased by Ian Welch in South Africa given a Loan agreement to Mainline Steam by Transnet, the Loco is stored at Waterval Boven Loco Depot at present will remain in South Africa.
15F 3153	North British	26037	1946			Ex-South African Railways. Privately owned by Mainline Steam volunteer Grant Bradley in South Africa and stored at Epping Market now in increasingly poor condition from outdoor storage (2024) .
19D 2695	A. Borsig	14746	1938	30 December 2007	Plimmerton	Purchased from the South African Railways by Unicem Zimbabwe and fitted with a Class 24 tender. It was then reclassified as their No.1. Purchased by Ian Welch in 2004 and moved to the Bulawayo Railway Museum where it was dismantled for shipping to New Zealand. Arrived in Napier on 30 December 2007 with 14A 509 and a Vanderbilt tender. Stored at Plimmerton.
19D 3332	North British	26052	1948			Ex-South African Railways. Purchased by Ian Welch and overhauled to operating condition. Now leased to North Cape Central Railway (NCCR) and moved to Robertson for use on a Dinner train.(September 2024)
24 3620	North British	26332	1949	7 August 1996	Parnell	Ex-South African Railways. Purchased by Ian Welch in 1994 from Spoornet via the Transnet Heritage Foundation. Overhauled by Spoornet at the Bloemfontein Locomotive Depot. Shipped to Auckland on 21 June 1996. Arrived at the Port of Auckland on 7 August of that year. Additional restoration commenced in early 1998 for the Kuranda Scenic Railway including conversion to oil firing. Work completed in late 2000, shipped to Cairns, Australia, on 23 January 2001. Entered service in 2004 but placed into storage in Cairns in 2006 due to a lack of hauling capacity which meant passenger numbers carried did not meet operating costs. Moved to Queenscliff near Melbourne, in January 2020 and is now in regular use on a dinner train.(2024)
24 3690	N/A	N/A	N/A	N/A		Stored in Bloemfontein, South Africa.
25NC 3432	Henschel & Son	28751	1953	7 August 1996	Mercer	Ex-South African Railways. It was purchased by Ian Welch in 1994 from Spoornet via the Transnet Heritage Foundation. It was overhauled by Spoornet at the Bloemfontein Locomotive Depot and shipped to Auckland on 21 June 1996. It arrived at the port of Auckland on 7 August in that year. Too large to operate in New Zealand, it is awaiting fresh cosmetic restoration after tens years stored outside.
25NC 3476	North British	27336	1953			Carries a Class 25NC Condenser Henschel Type EW2 Worshond tender, leased by Ian Welch in South Africa given a Loan agreement to Mainline Steam by TRANSnet, the Locomotive is stored at Waterval Boven Locomotive Depot to remain in South Africa.
25NC 3508	North British	27368	1954	7 August 1996	Mercer	It entered South African Railways service in 1954 as 25 Cond. It was reclassified as 25NC 3508 in the 1970s. It was withdrawn from service in 1991 and purchased by Amcoal, Enyati Colliery Railway. It was later purchased by Ian Welch in 1993 and transferred to Princetown then shipped to Auckland on 21 June 1996. It arrived at the port of Auckland on 7 August in that year. Too large to operate in New Zealand, it awaits a fresh cosmetic restoration.
GMAM 4056	Henschel & Son	28685	1954			Ex-South African Railways. Leased by Ian Welch in South Africa on a Loan agreement to Mainline Steam by Transnet, the Locomotive is stored at Waterval Boven Locomotive Depot to remain in South Africa.
GMAM 4083	Beyer, Peacock & Company	7681	1956	7 August 1996	Mercer	Entered South African Railways service in 1956. Withdrawn in 1989 and sold to the Enyati Colliery Railway. It was then on-sold to Randfontein Estates Gold Mine and reclassified as R3. Purchased by Ian Welch in 1995 in operating condition, it was shipped to Auckland on 21 June 1996. It arrived in the port of Auckland on 7 August 1996. In September 1996 it was steamed for two open days at Parnell. Further work commenced with a conversion from a coal to oil fuel and the fabrication of a new air brake stand. This work was stalled due to the restoration of 24 class No. 3260 and no work has been done ever since that time because of the reality that it is too large for the New Zealand railway loading gauge. The locomotive actually comprises the front engine unit of GMA/M 4126, the rear engine unit of GMA/M 4088 and the boiler unit of GMA/M 4083. Garratt's because of the interchangeability of the engine units, by tradition carry the running number of the boiler cradle.
GMAM 4135	North British	27787	1958			Ex-South African Railways. Initially sold to Reefsteamers, Germiston. It was then purchased by Ian Welch. In February 2011, it was moved to Hermanstad where it is stored by Friends of the Railway. In 2018, it was announced that the locomotive is for sale. Sold to Bernd Seiler / FarRail in June 2019.
GMAM 4136	North British	27788	1958			Ex-South African Railways. Became Randfontein gold mine R12 "Barbara" and then traded back to the THF. Leased to Mainline Steam, New Zealand by the THF as 4136. In storage at Bloemfontein
GMAM 4148	Henschel & Son	29607	1954			Ex-South African Railways. Purchased by Ian Welch, after a long period of storage, it was sold for scrap in 2011 and cut up at Reefsteamers in Germiston.

== Rolling stock register ==
=== Passenger rolling stock ===
Mainline Steam rosters a large fleet of carriages which will be formed into three trains:

- Train One – a 1920s-era train, painted in Emerald Green (lined out in Pullman Green style).
- Train Two – a train of 56' steel-panelled stock, painted Midnight blue with white lettering.
- Train Three – a train of BR MkII coaches, painted in Midnight Blue with Pearl Grey window band.

At present the stock for these trains are kept at Plimmerton and Middleton (with some MkII coaches stored at Feilding).

==== Train One ====
Key:	In Service	In Service, Main Line Certified	Under Overhaul/Restoration	Stored	Static Display	Scrapped

Original Class and Number	TMS Class and Number	Builder	Carriage Type	Year built	Arrived	Current Depot	Notes
A 391		NZR Petone Workshops	60' high-capacity wooden-body suburban coach	1908			Only surviving 60' suburban passenger coach. Purchased in 1967 by Milson Miniature Railway, donated in 2004 to Feilding District Steam & Rail. Placed in storage at Gladstone, Wairarapa in 2010. It is planned to install a generator for head-end power and to create a "Presidential Style" large end balcony at one end of the carriage.
A 1563	A 50480	NZR Petone Workshops	50' wooden body, passenger coach	1924	2013	Middleton	Purchased by Mainline Steam in running condition from Taieri Gorge Railway in 2013. Rebuilt with frame ex-F 443. Awaiting mainline certification.
A^{A} 1013		NZR Petone Workshops	50' wooden body, wide-body mainline coach	1908	July 2008	Plimmerton	Purchased from the NZR in 1977 and donated to the Tokomaru Steam Museum, before later being on-sold to a private individual at Pahiatua. Acquired by Mainline Steam in 2005, A^{A} 1013 was restored by the Wheelwright Woodworks in 2006–07 as the Premier Car and named "Aotearoa" before re-entering service in 2008. Last surviving complete coach from the Parliamentary Special of 1908, and took place in the recreation of this train in 2008.
A^{A} 1489		NZR Newmarket Workshops	50' 0" wooden body, wide-body mainline coach	1924			Purchased by Mainline Steam Trust from the Bush Tramway Club and moved to Gladstone, Wairarapa in 2007. Built as a sleeping coach in 1924, but converted to a day car in 1925. Restored by the Wheelwright Woodworks in 2016 and named "Te Arawa".
A^{A} 1669	EA 1922	NZR Otahuhu Workshops	50' 0" vittron panelled, wide-body mainline coach	1929	30 August 2016	Plimmerton	Purchased by Mainline Steam in 2008 and moved to Gladstone, Wairarapa. Formerly Way & Works E^{A} 4234, attached to a steam crane as a sleeping coach for the crane crew. Arrived in Plimmerton on 30 August 2016 where the last part of restoration will be carried out. Restored in December 2016 and named "Te Arawa".
F 458	F 721	NZR Newmarket Workshops	47' 6" wooden-bodied guards' van	1922			Initially donated for the Train One carriage set but believed to be surplus to Mainline Steam's requirements. Purchased from NZR by Bush Tramway Club member Eric Burns who donated it to Mainline Steam in 2008. F 458 is still at Pukemiro Junction as of 2013.

==== Train Two ====
Pre-TMS class and number	TMS classes and number	Builder	Carriage Type	Year built	Year arrived	Current Depot	Notes
A 1869	A 56081 A 2226; AO 209	NZR Otahuhu Workshops	56' steel-panelled mainline coach	1938	2011	Plimmerton	Purchased by Ian Welch from KiwiRail Scenic Journeys in May 2011. Fitted with large 'scenic' windows and a large end observation window at rear. Transferred from Parnell to Plimmerton in April 2015. Restoration commenced in November 2015.
A 1877	A 3006 AO 238	NZR Addington Workshops	56' steel-panelled mainline coach	1939	2018	Middleton	Purchased from The Great Journeys of New Zealand in 2018. Awaiting restoration.
A 1921	A 56271 ASO 68; AO 100	NZR Otahuhu Workshops	56' steel-panelled mainline coach	1939	2016	Plimmerton	Ex-Overlander car. Purchased by Feilding and District Steam Rail Society from KiwiRail Scenic Journeys in July 2013. Partially restored while under F&DSRS ownership. Later sold-on to Ian Welch circa 2015. Restoration recommenced in May 2018.
A 1955	A 56560 AO 146	NZR Addington Workshops	56' steel-panelled mainline coach	1939	2018	Middleton	Purchased from The Great Journeys of New Zealand in 2018. Awaiting restoration.
A 1957	A 56587 ASO 151	NZR Addington Workshops	56' steel-panelled mainline coach	1939	2018	Middleton	Purchased from The Great Journeys of New Zealand in 2018. Awaiting restoration.
A 1959	A 56600 ASO 136	NZR Addington Workshops	56' steel-panelled mainline coach	1939	2013	Plimmerton	Ex-Overlander car. Purchased by Ian Welch from KiwiRail Scenic Journeys in July 2013. Restored 2013 to 2014. Mainline certified.
A 1964	A 56634 AO 123	NZR Addington Workshops	56' steel-panelled mainline coach	1940	2014	Plimmerton	Ex-Overlander car. Purchased by Ian Welch from KiwiRail Scenic Journeys in July 2013. Restored in 2015 to 2016. Mainline certified.
A 1966	A 56678 AO 215	NZR Addington Workshops	56' steel-panelled mainline coach	1940	2013	Plimmerton	Ex-Overlander car, fitted with large rear observation window. Purchased by Ian Welch from KiwiRail Scenic Journeys in July 2013. Restored 2013 to 2014. Mainline certified.
A 1971	A 3346 AO 19	NZR Otahuhu Workshops	56' steel-panelled mainline coach	1945	2013	Middleton	Purchased by Ian Welch from KiwiRail Scenic Journeys in July 2013. Restored 2014 to 2016. Awaiting mainline certification.
A 1972	A 3354 AO 25	NZR Otahuhu Workshops	56' steel-panelled mainline coach	1945	2013	Middleton	Purchased by Ian Welch from KiwiRail Scenic Journeys in July 2013. Under restoration. Restoration commenced in August 2016.
A 1976	A 3397 AO 60	NZR Otahuhu Workshops	56' steel-panelled mainline coach	1939	2013	Middleton	Purchased by Ian Welch from KiwiRail Scenic Journeys in July 2013. Restored in 2016 to 2017. Awaiting mainline certification.
A 1981	A 56726 A 2151; AO 31	NZR Otahuhu Workshops	56' steel-panelled mainline coach	1942	2013	Plimmerton	Ex-Overlander car. Purchased by Ian Welch from KiwiRail Scenic Journeys in July 2013. Restored 2014 to 2015. Mainline certified.
A 1992	A 2060 EA 6709; AO 117	NZR Addington Workshops	56' steel-panelled mainline coach	1940	2011	Plimmerton	Purchased by Ian Welch from KiwiRail Scenic Journeys in May 2011. It was sold-on to Feilding and District Steam Rail Society in 2013. Later resold back to Ian Welch circa 2015. Restoration commenced in September 2016.
A 2003	A 56876 AO 48	NZR Otahuhu Workshops	56' steel-panelled mainline coach	1939	2013	Plimmerton	Ex-Overlander car. Purchased by Ian Welch from KiwiRail Scenic Journeys in July 2013. Restored in 2014. Mainline certified.
F^{M} 6	FM 134 AG 32	Mitsubishi	50' steel-panelled guards' van	1977	2006	Plimmerton	Restoration commenced in April 2017, and will be converted to an generator/observation van.
	FM 1041 EA 7144; EAM 24; FM 3010	Daewoo	50' steel-panelled guards' van	1981	1993	Plimmerton	Restored c2007 to 2010 as generator/observation van, and renumbered as FM 3010. Although originally restored for the train 3 rake, but it is currently used train 2 rake. Mainline certified.
	FM 1375	Mitsubishi	50' steel-panelled guards' van	1981	N/A	Middleton	Originally identified as FM 1185. Restoration commenced in October 2017, and will be converted to an generator/observation van.

==== Train Three ====
Class and number	TMS number	BR number	Name	Builder	Carriage type	Year built	Year arrived	Current depot	Notes
BR 3393		BR 1208		British Rail Engineering Ltd (Derby)	60' steel-clad mainline passenger coach	1972	2008	Plimmerton	Stored at Plimmerton. Awaiting restoration.
BR 3409		BR 72508		British Rail Engineering Ltd (Derby)	60' steel-clad mainline passenger coach	1972	2008	Plimmerton	Ex-Gatwick Express. Stored at Plimmerton. Awaiting restoration. Offered for sale in February 2025 on their Facebook page.
BR 5972		BR 72624		British Rail Engineering Ltd (Derby)	60' steel-clad mainline passenger coach	1972			Ex-Gatwick Express. Currently stored in the Manawatū.
BR 5988				British Rail Engineering Ltd (Derby)	60' steel-clad mainline passenger coach	1972	2008	Plimmerton	Ex-Virgin Trains Tourist Standard Open (TSO). Stored at Plimmerton. Awaiting restoration.
BR 6039		BR 72644		British Rail Engineering Ltd (Derby)	60' steel-clad mainline passenger coach	1972			Ex-Gatwick Express. Currently stored in the Manawatu.
BR 6085		BR 72625		British Rail Engineering Ltd (Derby)	60' steel-clad mainline passenger coach	1972			Ex-Gatwick Express. Currently stored in the Manawatu.
BR 6091		BR 72712		British Rail Engineering Ltd (Derby)	60' steel-clad mainline passenger coach	1972			Ex-Gatwick Express. Currently stored in the Manawatu.
F^{M} 37	FM 480 FM 3027			Mitsubishi	50' steel-panelled guards' van	1978	2001	Plimmerton	Originally owned by Wairoa YMCA and converted to a carriage (one of two). Sold to MLS, converted to dining car FM 3027 at Plimmerton. Certification for mainline use pending, and will be used with the MkII rake.
ML 3299				British Rail Engineering Ltd (Derby)	60' steel-clad mainline passenger coach	1972	2007	Plimmerton	Ex-Virgin Trains First Open (FO), sixth MkII overhaul. Currently under restoration.
ML 3433			Mangaweka	British Rail Engineering Ltd (Derby)	60' steel-clad mainline passenger coach	1972	2007	Plimmerton	Ex-Virgin Trains First Open (FO), fourth MkII overhauled. Restored 2007 - c2012. Awaiting mainline certification.
ML 5914				British Rail Engineering Ltd (Derby)	60' steel-clad mainline passenger coach	1972	2008	Plimmerton	Ex-Virgin Trains Tourist Standard Open (TSO), fifth MkII overhauled. Restored c2012. Awaiting mainline certification.
ML 5915			Raurimu	British Rail Engineering Ltd (Derby)	60' steel-clad mainline passenger coach	1972	2007	Plimmerton	Ex-Virgin Trains Second Open (SO), second MkII overhauled. Restored c2012. Awaiting mainline certification.
ML 5939			Wellington-Manawatu Railway	British Rail Engineering Ltd (Derby)	60' steel-clad mainline passenger coach	1972	2007	Plimmerton	Ex-Virgin Trains Second Open (SO), first MkII overhauled. Awaiting mainline certification. Restored 2007 - 2010.
ML 6149			Rimutaka	British Rail Engineering Ltd (Derby)	60' steel-clad mainline passenger coach	1972	2007	Plimmerton	Ex-Virgin Trains Second Open (SO), third MkII overhauled. Restored c2012. Awaiting mainline certification.
SD 5761				British Rail Engineering Ltd (Derby)	64' 6" steel-clad mainline passenger coach	1973	2018	Plimmerton	Originally used in the United Kingdom. One of Ian Welch's original 15 BR Mark II cars ordered in 1997 sold to Tranz Rail then used as an Auckland Transport suburban driving compartment carriage from 2005 to 2015. To be rebuilt as an end-big window observation car.

== Freight rolling stock ==
Mainline Steam has a large collection of freight rolling stock, mostly consisting of tank wagons used for oil and water storage, some of which are mainline certified. These wagons are largely of the UC class, although there is one example of each of the UCA and URK wagons preserved. The group also has a number of KP, ZA, and ZL class box wagons for use as secure storage for locomotive and carriage parts, along with several other general-use goods wagons.

=== Wagons ===
Key:	In service	In service, Mainline Certified	Under overhaul/restoration	Stored	Static display	Scrapped

Original class and number	TMS class and number	Type	Builder	Year built	Current depots	Notes
K^{P} 1305	KP 4330	Box	NZR Otahuhu Workshops	1961	N/A	Entered NZR service on 25 February 1961. Renumbered as KP 4330 in 1978. Withdrawn on 4 January 1986.
K^{P} 1484	KP 6224	Box	NZR Otahuhu Workshops	1961	Middleton	Entered NZR service on 7 October 1961. Renumbered as KP 7943 in 1978. Withdrawn on 29 March 1986. Used as a storage wagon.
K^{P} 2178	KP 13601	Box	NZR Addington Workshops	1965	Glenbrook Vintage Railway	Entered NZR service in 1965. Renumbered as KP 13601 in 1978. Withdrawn in April 1988. Stored at the Glenbrook Vintage Railway.
K^{P} 2367	KP 15582	Box	Mitsubishi Heavy Industries	1965	N/A	Entered NZR service on 11 September 1965. Renumbered as KP 15582 in 1978. Withdrawn on 21 May 1988.
K^{P} 2650	KP 18607	Box	NZR Otahuhu Workshops	1965	Glenbrook Vintage Railway	Entered NZR service in 1967. Renumbered as KP 18607 in 1978. Withdrawn in December 1988. Stored at the Glenbrook Vintage Railway.
K^{P} 3251	KP 25011	Box	Mitsubishi Heavy Industries	1961	Plimmerton	Entered NZR service on 31 March 1961. Renumbered as KP 25011 in 1978. Withdrawn on 16 August 1986. Used as a storage wagon for parts.
K^{P} 3452	KP 27147	Box	NZR Hutt Workshops	1968	Glenbrook Vintage Railway	Entered NZR service on 7 December 1968. Renumbered as KP 27147 in 1978. Withdrawn on 16 August 1986. Stored at the Glenbrook Vintage Railway.
K^{S} 4130	KS 7784	Box	NZR Hillside Workshops	1970	Glenbrook Vintage Railway	Entered NZR service on 5 December 1970. Renumbered as KS 7784 in 1978. Used as a storage wagon. Stored at the Glenbrook Vintage Railway.
L^{B} 2048	LB 523	High Side	N/A	1976	N/A	Entered NZR service on 31 January 1976. Renumbered as LB 523 in 1978.
L^{B} 2204	LB 1159	High Side	NZR Addington Workshops	1976	N/A	Entered NZR service on 28 February 1976. Renumbered as LB 1159 in 1978.
L^{B} 2740	LB 8313	High Side	NZR Addington Workshops	1976	Otahuhu	Entered NZR service in June 1976. Renumbered as LB 8313 in 1978. Used as a passenger wagon on Parnell depot open days. Stored in Otahuhu.
L^{B} 3432	LB 14743	High Side	NZR Addington Workshops	1976	Middleton	Entered NZR service on 6 November 1976. Renumbered as LB 14743 in 1978. Used as a storage wagon.
L^{BF} 1451	LB 15696	High Side	N/A	N/A	Otahuhu	Reclassified as LB 15696 at East Town Workshops in July 1986. Used as a passenger wagon on Parnell depot open days. Stored in Otahuhu.
L^{C}	LC 74437	High Side	N/A	N/A	Middleton	Used as a storage wagon.
L^{PA} 1378	LPA 4765	High Side	NZR Addington Workshops	1973	Otahuhu	Entered NZR service on 28 April 1973. Renumbered as LPA 4765 in 1978. Used as a storage wagon. Stored in Otahuhu.
M^{C} 45141		Low Side	Mainline Steam	N/A	Middleton	Built by Mainline Steam at their Middleton depot. Used as a storage wagon.
Unidentified N^{AK}	Unidentified NAK	Flat Deck	N/A	N/A	Middleton	
R^{B} 575	RB 651	High Side	NZR Otahuhu Workshops	1960	N/A	Renumbered as RB 651 in 1978. Leased to Feilding and District Steam Rail Society.
U^{B} 1142	UB 3006	Flat Deck	NZR Otahuhu Workshops	1945	Otahuhu	Entered NZR service in 1945. Reclassified as UB 3006 in 1978. Withdrawn on 1 February 1984. Stored in Otahuhu.
U^{C} 793	UC 64	Tank	NZR Newmarket Workshops	1927	Plimmerton	Entered NZR service in 1927. Renumbered as UC 64 in 1978.
U^{C} 797	UC 104	Tank	NZR Newmarket Workshops	1926	Plimmerton	Entered NZR service in 1926. Renumbered UC 104 in 1978.
U^{C} 799	UC 127	Tank	N/A	1926	Otahuhu	Entered NZR service in 1926. Renumbered UC 127 in 1978. Stored in Otahuhu.
U^{C} 809	UC 231	Tank	NZR Petone Workshops	1927	Glenbrook Vintage Railway	Entered NZR service on 28 July 1927. Renumbered as UC 231 in 1978. Stored at the Glenbrook Vintage Railway.
U^{C} 823	UC 277	Tank	N/A	1927	Middleton	Entered NZR service in 1927. Renumbered as UC 277 in 1978.
U^{C} 825	UC 300	Tank	N/A	1927	Plimmerton	Entered NZR service in 1927. Renumbered as UC 300 in 1978.
U^{C} 827	UC 323	Tank	N/A	1927	Plimmerton	Entered NZR service in 1927. Renumbered as UC 323 in 1978. Used as an oil tanker.
U^{C} 864	UC 634	Tank	N/A	1929	Glenbrook Vintage Railway	Entered NZR service in 1929. Renumbered as UC 634 in 1978. Used as an oil tanker. At Glenbrook Vintage Railway.
U^{C} 877	UC 784	Tank	N/A	1930	Plimmerton	Entered NZR service in 1930. Renumbered as UC 784 in 1978. Formerly an ex – Lyttelton oil storage wagon.
U^{C} 1215	UC 1184	Tank	NZR Otahuhu Workshops	1955	Middleton	Entered NZR service in 1955. Renumbered as UC 1184 in 1978.
U^{C} 1216	UC 1190	Tank	NZR Otahuhu Workshops	1955	Glenbrook Vintage Railway	Entered NZR service in 1955. Renumbered as UC 1190 in 1978. Stored at the Glenbrook Vintage Railway.
U^{C} 1234	UC 1495	Tank	NZR Addington Workshops	1947	Plimmerton	Entered NZR service in 1947. Renumbered as UC 1495 in 1978. Repainted yellow and is used as an oil storage wagon.
U^{C} 1256	UC 1783	Tank	NZR Addington Workshops	1948	Plimmerton	Entered NZR service in September 1948. Renumbered as UC 1783 in 1978. Used as an oil storage wagon.
U^{C} 1258	UC 1852	Tank	NZR Addington Workshops	1948	Middleton	Entered NZR service in September 1948. Renumbered as UC 1852 in 1978.
U^{C} 1278	UC 2079	Tank	NZR Otahuhu Workshops	1950	Middleton	Entered NZR service in 1950. Renumbered as UC 2079 in 1978.
U^{C} 1288	UC 2177	Tank	NZR Addington Workshops	1951	Plimmerton	Entered NZR service in 1951. Renumbered as UC 2177 in 1978. Used as an oil collection vehicle.
U^{C} 1339	UC 2730	Tank	NZR Addington Workshops	1950	Otahuhu	Entered NZR service in 1950. Renumbered as UC 2730 in 1978. Stored in Otahuhu.
U^{C} 1341	UC 2753	Tank	NZR Addington Workshops	1950	Middleton	Entered NZR service in 1950. Renumbered as UC 2753 in 1978.
U^{C} 1349	UC 2851	Tank	NZR Otahuhu Workshops	1964	Plimmerton	Entered NZR service in 1964. Renumbered as UC 2851 in 1978. Repainted red and is used as an oil storage wagon.
U^{C} 1483		Tank	N/A	N/A	Plimmerton	Repainted green.
U^{C} 1580	UC 2995	Tank	NZR Hillside Workshops	1967	Glenbrook Vintage Railway	Entered NZR service on 15 July 1967. Renumbered as UC 2995 in 1978. Stored at the Glenbrook Vintage Railway.
U^{C} 1593	UC 3130	Tank	NZR Hillside Workshops	1967	Plimmerton	Entered NZR service on 2 December 1967. Renumbered as UC 3130 in 1978. Used as a water tanker.
U^{C} 1624	UC 3429	Tank	NZR Otahuhu Workshops	1972	Plimmerton	Entered NZR service on 1 January 1972. Renumbered as UC 3429 in 1978. Used as an oil storage wagon.
Unidentified U^{CA}	UCA 155	Tank	Commonwealth Engineering	1975	Plimmerton	
U^{C} 1819	UC 3677 UCA 223	Tank	NZR Hutt Workshops	1976	Otahuhu	Entered NZR service in July 1976. Renumbered as UC 3677 in 1978. Reclassified as UCA 223 in 1979. Stored in Otahuhu.
U^{R} 1819	UR 191	Flat Deck	NZR Addington Workshops	1959	Otahuhu	Entered NZR service on 10 October 1959. Renumbered as UR 191 in 1978. Stored in Otahuhu.
Unidentified U^{RK}	URK 66	Tank	N/A	N/A	Middleton	Withdrawn in 1988.
Unidentified U^{SQ}	USQ 8103	Flat Deck	N/A	N/A	Plimmerton	Used as a container wagon.
V^{R} 113	VR 1134	Insulated Meat	NZR Otahuhu Workshops	1964	Glenbrook Vintage Railway	Entered NZR service in March 1964. Renumbered as VR 1134 in 1978. Withdrawn on 22 June 1985. Stored at the Glenbrook Vintage Railway.
X^{P} 2989	XP 278	Ventilated Box	NZR East Town Workshops	1966	Otahuhu	Entered NZR service in 1966. Renumbered as XP 278 in 1978. Withdrawn in September 1981. Stored in Otahuhu.
X^{P} 3027	XP 687	Ventilated Box	NZR East Town Workshops	1966	Otahuhu	Entered NZR service in 1966. Renumbered as XP 278 in 1978. Withdrawn in November 1983. Stored in Otahuhu.
Z^{A} 1521	ZA 2712	Box	NZR Otahuhu Workshops	N/A	Middleton	Entered NZR service on 5 November 1977. Renumbered as ZA 2712 in 1978.
	ZL 387	Box	N/A	N/A	Plimmerton	Used as a storage wagon for parts.

== Excursions ==
Mainline Steam operate regular excursions using steam locomotives from the trust's collection. These run from Auckland, Wellington or Christchurch to a number of destinations. These range from short half-day excursions to an annual national tour lasting several weeks and covering much of KiwiRail's railway network.
