= NZR KA class =

New Zealand steam locomotive class (1939–1967)

NZR K^{A} class
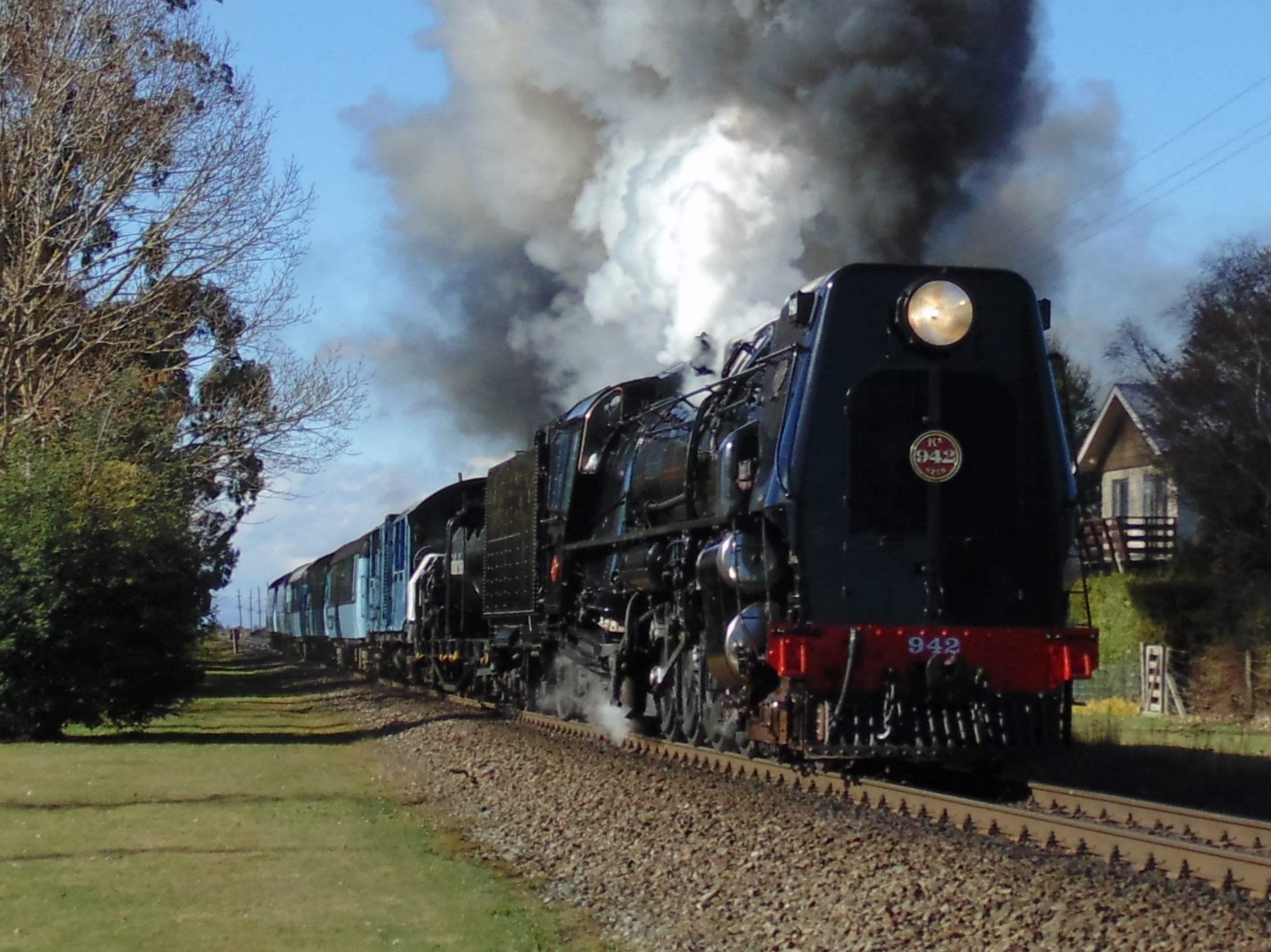
- K^{A} 942 in Kirwee with a excursion to Arthurs Pass on 31 August 2014
Type and origin
- Power type: Steam
- Builder: NZR Hutt Workshops; NZR Hillside Workshops
- Build date: 1939 - 1945, 1950
- Total produced: 35
Specifications
- Configuration
  - Whyte: 4-8-4
- Gauge: 3 ft 6 in (1,067 mm)
- Wheel diameter: 54 in (1.372 m)
- Wheelbase: 34 ft 10 in (10.62 m)
- Length: 69 ft 8 in (21.23 m)
- Width: 8 ft 6 in (2.59 m)
- Height: 11 ft 6 in (3.51 m)
- Adhesive weight: 56.4 long tons (57.3 t; 63.2 short tons)
- Loco weight: 93 long tons (94 t; 104 short tons)
- Tender weight: 52.9 long tons (53.7 t; 59.2 short tons)
- Total weight: 145.9 long tons (148.2 t; 163.4 short tons)
- Fuel type: Coal (original); Oil (converted 1947 - 1953)
- Fuel capacity: 7.5 long tons (7.6 t; 8.4 short tons) coal 1,570 imp gal (7,100 L; 1,890 US gal) oil
- Water cap.: 5,000 imp gal (23,000 L)
- Firebox
  - Grate area: 47.7 square feet (4.4 m^{2})
- Boiler pressure: 200 psi (1,379 kPa)
- Feedwater heater: ACFI (K^{A} 930 - 959)
- Heating surface: 1,933 square feet (179.6 m^{2})
- Superheater
  - Heating area: 485 square feet (45.1 m^{2})
- Cylinders: 2
- Cylinder size: 20 in × 26 in (508 mm × 660 mm)
Performance figures
- Maximum speed: 121 km/h (75 mph)
- Power output: 1,445 hp (1,078 kW)
- Tractive effort: 30,815 lbf (137.07 kN)
Career
- Operators: NZR
- Number in class: 35
- Numbers: 930 - 964
- Official name: "Nigel Bruce" (K^{A} 942)
- Locale: North Island of New Zealand
- First run: November 1939
- Last run: December 1967
- Retired: 1965 - 1967
- Restored: 1985 (K^{A} 945), 1990 (K^{A} 942)
- Scrapped: 1966 - 1967
- Current owner: Mainline Steam, Silver Stream Railway, Steam Incorporated
- Disposition: Three preserved, two wrecked, remainder scrapped

The NZR K^{A} class of 1939 was a class of mixed traffic 4-8-4 steam locomotives that operated on New Zealand's railway network. They were built after the success of the K class to meet the increasing traffic demands of the New Zealand Railways Department. The locomotives first appeared with distinctive streamlining, mainly to hide their ACFI feedwater heater systems.

== History ==
Following the success of the K class, there was a need for more similar locomotives in the North Island. The new locomotives incorporated a number of improvements, including a re-designed plate frame to eliminate the cracking issues the K class were experiencing; roller bearings on all wheels; hydrostatic lubrication throughout; and the inclusion of the ACFI feedwater heater system as pioneered by K 919. As the ACFI equipment was criticised for its aesthetic appearance, it was obscured with shrouding fitted to both the K^{A} class and contemporary K^{B} class.

Building of the locomotives commenced in 1939, just prior to the Second World War. Main construction and assembly took place at Hutt Workshops. Hillside Workshops largely constructed - but did not assemble - ten of the class (No.'s 940-944, 960-964) and built a further five K^{A} boilers. The primary reason why the ten K^{A}s were not assembled at Hillside was that there was no way of transporting complete locomotives between the North and South Islands at the time (the first inter-island rail ferry did not commence until 1962). Vulcan Foundry of the United Kingdom supplied parts for fifteen locomotives, including most chassis components, tender bogies, and boiler foundation rings. The General Casting Corporation of Pennsylvania, United States supplied trailing bogie and rear end framing. A company in Auckland also constructed up to 10 tenders for the class. While the imported components were intended for specific locomotives (and in some cases were stamped for the locomotives they were intended for) in practice, and due to wartime pressures, the imported components were used indiscriminately for any K^{A} locomotives in the programme.

Nineteen locomotives were built between 1939 and 1941, but wartime circumstances meant construction of the remaining sixteen lasted from 1941 to 1950, a period much longer than NZR management anticipated. The first of the locomotives to be completed was K^{A} 945. All but two members of the class were constructed by 1946. The final pair, numbers 958 and 959, differed somewhat from the rest of their class due to being fitted with the Baker valve gear instead of the Walschaerts valve gear fitted to all other members, and were oil burners from new. Like some of the other later K^{A}s, they were not built with shrouding, although the front shrouding and many front-end components had been built for K^{A} 959 for display at an exhibition. These were ultimately used on K^{A} 939.

== In service ==
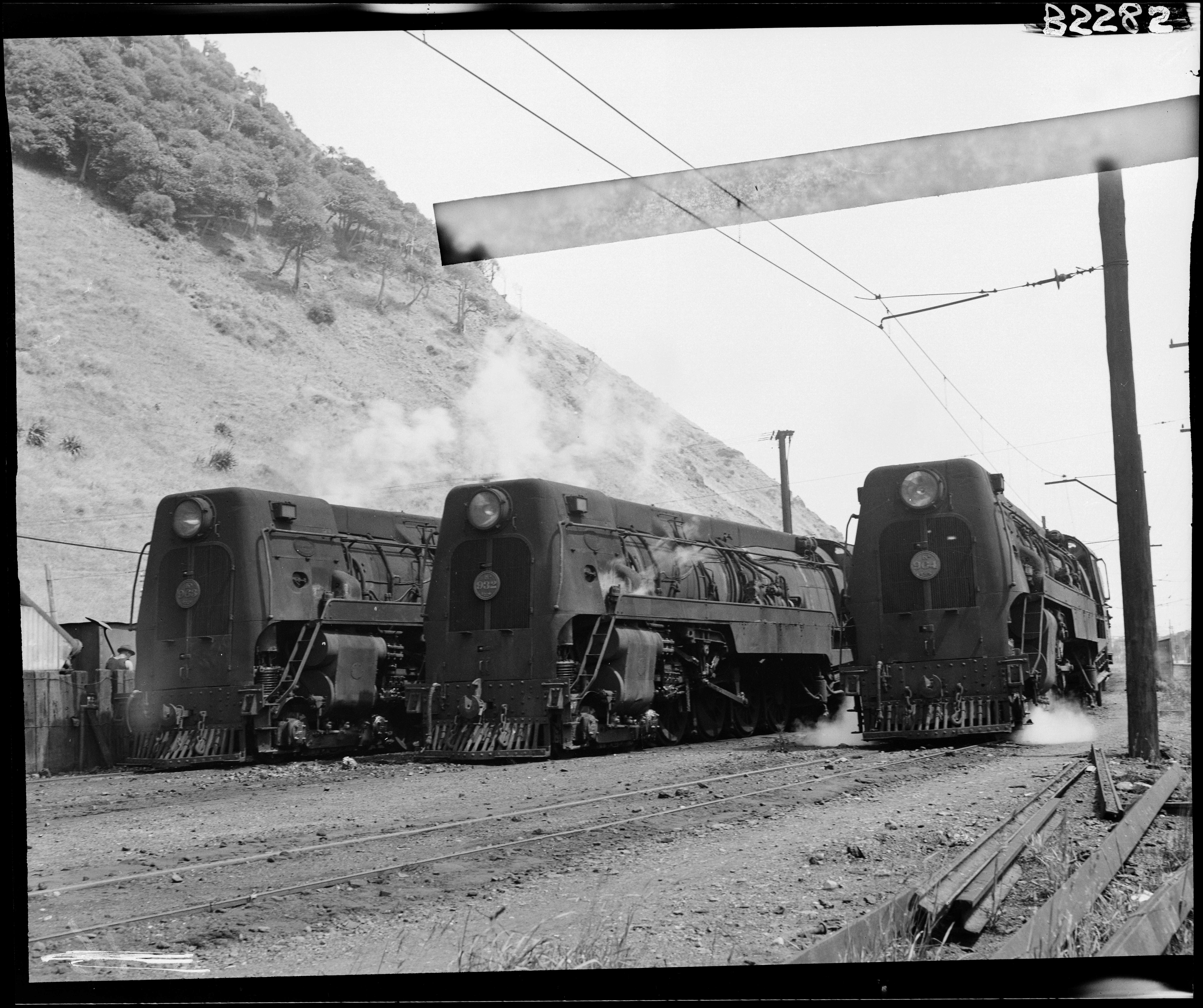
Three K^{A} locomotives (963, 932 and 964) at Paekakariki in 1951

The K^{A} class was solely based in the North Island, and upon entering service, the first members were placed on heavy freight and express passenger services. They saw extensive use on these tasks during wartime. The shrouding was open at the top and began gathering soot and dust that affected the working environment in the cab. After 1945, a coal shortage led NZR to convert a large number of locomotives to oil burning. The K^{A} class were a prime candidate due to the large size of the grate. Conversion to oil-burning occurred from 1947 and 1953, with nineteen of the class converted at Otahuhu Workshops and sixteen at Hutt. The conversion coincided with the removal of the shrouding and also the replacement of the ACFI feedwater system with an exhaust steam injector. As a result, the locomotives were able to obtain faster speeds, with speeds up to 121 kilometres per hour (75 mph) recorded.

The locomotives became a mainstay of the North Island motive power fleet and were primarily used on the North Island Main Trunk Railway, operating the overnight Express and Night Limited from 1940. When the North Island J^{A} entered service in 1952 they took over the express and limited services on the Taumaranui - Auckland section, but the K^{A} continued to be used on the Paekakariki - Taumaranui section of the limited and express, until displaced by D^{A} class diesel locomotives between 1963 and 1965. On the last day of the steam power on the Night Limited, in April 1963 and the Express in February 1965, K^{A} locomotives worked the train right through to Auckland.

The last two K^{A} were completed in 1950, and used Baker valve gear fitted to the NZR J and J^{A} classes. K^{A} 958 and K^{A} 959 were regulars on the Limited in the 1950s and early 1960s out of Paekakariki to Taihape. The Baker valve gear altered their performance characteristics, making them quite free-running on passenger train duties, but less effective and powerful on freight trains compared to the rest of the class. K^{A} locomotives also worked other lines, such as the Palmerston North - Gisborne Line as far as Napier and the Stratford–Okahukura Line. K^{A} locomotives usually pulled the Rotorua express between Hamilton and Rotorua until it was replaced by railcars in 1959 and were used on relief expresses to New Plymouth and Napier until 1965. In the last period of K^{A} use between 1959-1967, their freight use was mainly as bankers in the King Country and the steep banks on the Wanganui and Rotorua lines, as well as mixed trains in the King Country. They remained important for passenger use because of their superior performance in the central North Island and the fact until 1958-59 and the introduction of real air competition with turboprop Friendships and Viscounts the Overnight Express, Limited and summer Daylight limited, were the main public transport between Wellington and Auckland. The K^{A} class had higher fuel consumption and repair issues than the J^{A} class.

At one stage, K^{A} 944 was sent to the South Island for an overhaul at Hillside Workshops and for subsequent use on the Midland Line along with the K^{B} class.

== Withdrawal and disposal ==
One member of the class, K^{A} 949, was wrecked in the Tangiwai disaster on 24 December 1953, New Zealand's worst railway disaster. Although recovered from the Whangaehu River and taken away to Hutt Workshops, it was officially written off in April 1955 as it was damaged beyond repair. Although K^{A} 949 was ultimately scrapped, NZR recovered quite a number of components from it and re-used these on other locomotives as the need arose.

Another member of the class, K^{A} 951, was wrecked after being swept into the flooded river Manawatū Gorge by a landslide. Both driver and fireman were killed. The engine was winched out in sections days later.

With the commencement of mainline dieselisation in 1954, the class was slowly displaced from front line service, especially as the D^{A} class was progressively introduced to service from 1955. Withdrawals began in 1964. The last locomotive in revenue service, K^{A} 935, ran in December 1967 being withdrawn with sibling locomotives K^{A} 945 and K^{A} 941. K^{A} 942 was held for a time at Hutt Workshops for possible use as a stationary boiler, but this did not proceed at all.

== Preservation ==
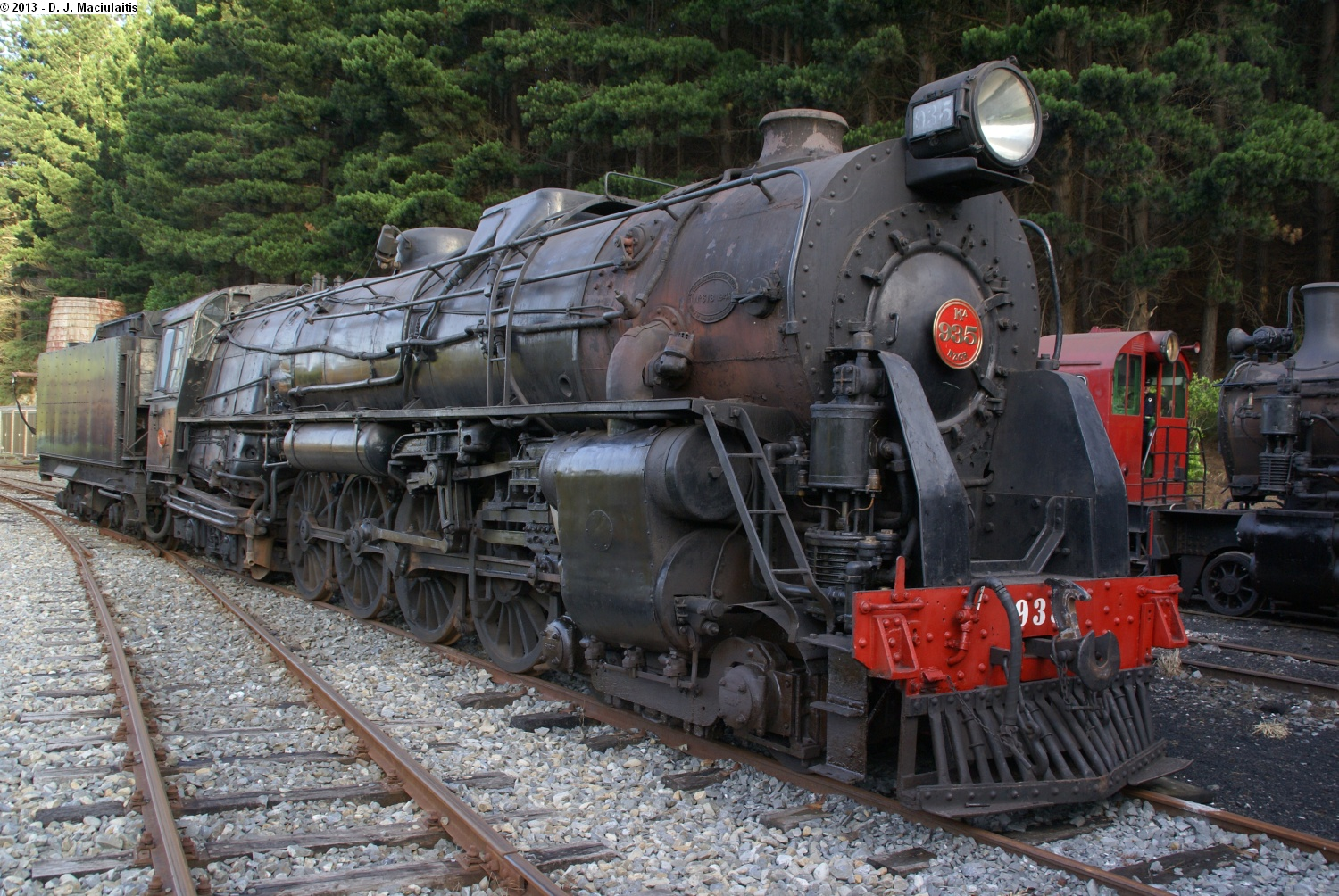
K^{A} 935 at Silver Stream Railway, on 30 November 2013

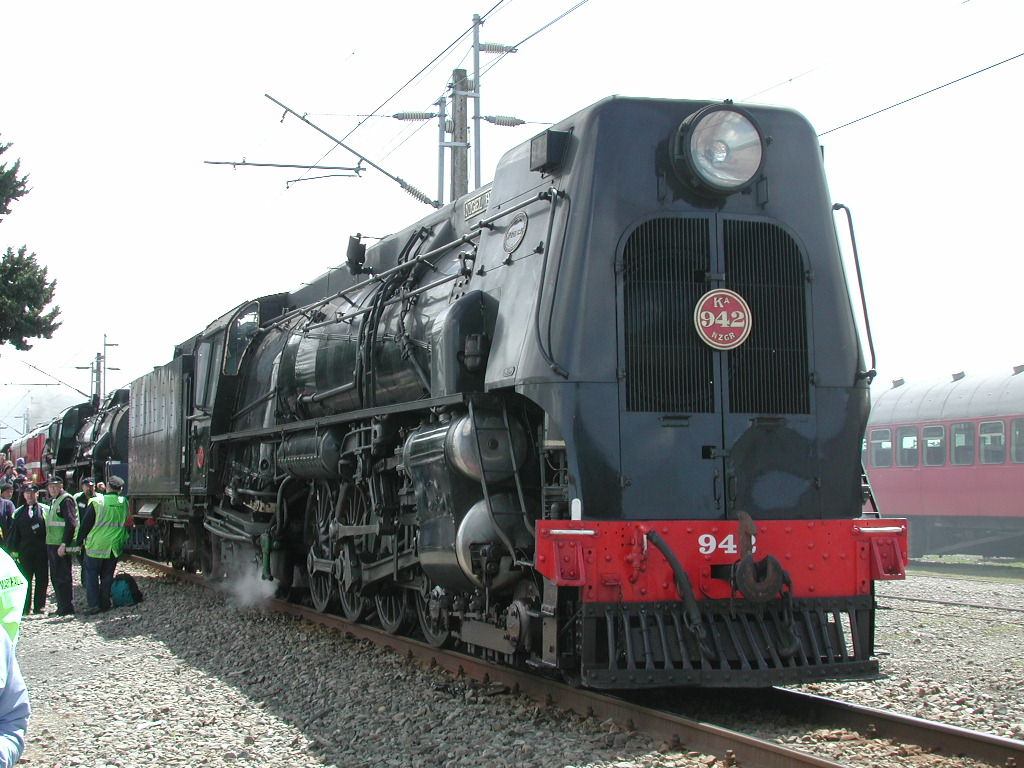
K^{A} 942 at the North Island Main Trunk centenary at Feilding, 26 October 2008

Three of the K^{A} class have been preserved:

K^{A} 935 was preserved by the Wellington Branch Line of the New Zealand Railway & Locomotive Society in 1967, and was initially stored at the Waikato Railway Museum in Te Awamutu until the site at Seaview, Lower Hutt where a railway was being established. Later K^{A} 935 moved along with the rest of the collection to the new site at the Silver Stream Railway in 1984, being moved there in steam behind a diesel towing the rest of the items. Since that time K^{A} 935 has remained at Silverstream and is currently out of service awaiting a 10-year overhaul. Due to the short nature of the Silver Stream Railway, 935 has been converted from superheating to a saturated state by removal of the superheater elements.

K^{A} 942 "Nigel Bruce" was preserved by Ian Welch in 1972, after having been laid up at Hutt Workshops as a possible addition to three K class locomotives being used as a stationary boiler supply. It was moved to Steam Incorporated and some limited work was done on restoring it and by the mid-1980s it had been moved to Otaki for open-air storage. In 1989, it was moved to the Glenbrook Vintage Railway where it was restored to working order, and mainline certified - first running from July 1990, wearing its former streamline shrouding, being used on an excursion in the South Island in 1992. Initially based out of the Mainline Steam Heritage Trust's Parnell depot, it alternated between Parnell and Christchurch before being moved to Wellington in 2001 so that a comprehensive 10-year overhaul could be conducted. K^{A} 942 returned to service in June 2008.

K^{A} 945 was preserved by Wellington businessman Len Southward, creator of the Southward Car Museum. Southward purchased the locomotive in 1968 and had the locomotive stored in Taumaranui at first, with the intention of displaying it at the car museum. Other projects demanded most of Southward's time, so in 1973, he approached Steam Incorporated to see if they could house the locomotive at their facility in Paekakariki. Later, in 1981, he gifted K^{A} 945 to Steam Incorporated, and they began overhauling it to working order. In late 1984, the pace of work accelerated to have it ready just in time for the return of steam to the mainline in April 1985, a goal which was achieved. It then pulled the North Island Main Trunk Centennial in April 1985 with Glenbrook Vintage Railway's J^{A} 1250 "Diana". In the 10 years that followed K^{A} 945 ran numerous excursions all over the country, including the Cadbury Crunchie Train Tour of May 1993. In June 1995, it was withdrawn for overhaul and due to a number of constraints, it was not until 2014 that work on this locomotive could begin. The locomotive is currently undergoing a thorough overhaul back to mainline standard.
