= NZR K class (1932) =

Class of 4-8-4 steam locomotives

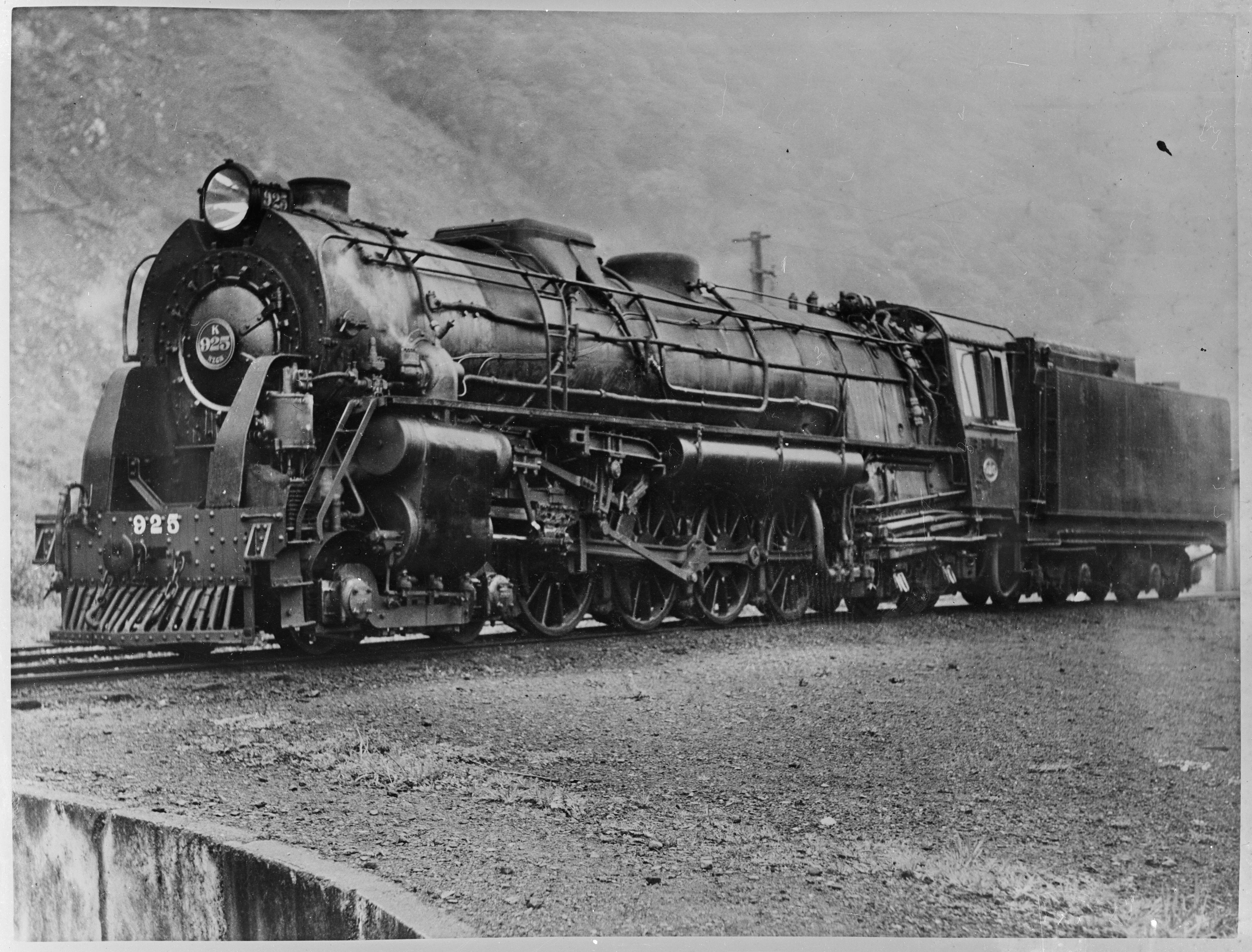
- K class locomotive 925 at Paekākāriki in 1935.
Type and origin
- Power type: Steam
- Builder: NZR Hutt Workshops
- Build date: 1932 - 1936
Specifications
- Configuration
  - Whyte: 4-8-4
- Gauge: 3 ft 6 in (1,067 mm)
- Driver dia.: 54 inches (1.372 m)
- Wheelbase: 61 ft 10.5 in (18.86 m)
- Length: 69 ft 8 in (21.23 m)
- Width: 8 ft 6 in (2.59 m)
- Height: 11 ft 6 in (3.51 m)
- Adhesive weight: 54.25 long tons (55.12 t; 60.76 short tons)
- Loco weight: 85.6 long tons (87.0 t; 95.9 short tons)
- Tender weight: 50.0 long tons (50.8 t; 56.0 short tons)
- Total weight: 135.6 long tons (137.8 t; 151.9 short tons)
- Fuel type: Coal (original); Oil (converted 1947 - 1953)
- Fuel capacity: 7.75 long tons (7.87 t; 8.68 short tons) coal 1,570 imp gal (7,100 L; 1,890 US gal) oil
- Water cap.: 5,000 imp gal (23,000 L; 6,000 US gal)
- Firebox
  - Grate area: 47.7 sq ft (4.4 m^{2})
- Boiler pressure: 200 psi (1,379 kPa)
- Heating surface: 1,933 sq ft (179.6 m^{2})
- Superheater
  - Heating area: 485 sq ft (45.1 m^{2})
- Cylinders: Two
- Cylinder size: 20 in × 26 in (508 mm × 660 mm)
Performance figures
- Maximum speed: 105 km/h (65 mph)
- Tractive effort: 30,815 lbf (137.1 kN)
Career
- Number in class: 30
- Numbers: 900 - 929
- First run: 1932
- Preserved: 3
- Disposition: Withdrawn, 3 preserved

The NZR K class of 1932 was a class of mixed traffic 4-8-4 steam locomotives built by the New Zealand Railways Department (NZR) that operated on New Zealand's railway network. The locomotives were developed following the failure of the G class Garratt locomotives. The class should not be confused with the much earlier K class of 1877-78, the first American-built engines to arrive in New Zealand.

== History ==
The three G class locomotives were introduced by NZR in response to increased tonnages, especially on the mountainous, demanding North Island Main Trunk Railway. Various faults led to their swift withdrawal from service and NZR still needed a large and powerful type of locomotive. It decided to develop a conventional rather than an articulated locomotive to avoid a repeat of the G-class failure.

Initially conceived as a 4-8-2 locomotive, the K class was to be at least 50% more powerful than the A^{B} class, and due to New Zealand's narrow gauge track and limited loading gauge, the power had to be very carefully compressed into an area smaller than would usually be used for such a locomotive.

Constructed at Hutt Workshops, the class utilised plate frames, partial mechanical lubrication, Franklin butterfly Firehole doors, and roller bearings on all, but the trailing bogie. The class had a distinctive appearance when first outshopped, with a pressed smokebox front and the headlight jutting out forward of the top of the smokebox. This latter feature was soon changed at the insistence of one of the Railway’s Board of Management – instead, it was sunken flush into the smokebox, which required some modification and changed the aesthetic look of the class quite markedly.

K 919 was given an ACFI feedwater heater system as a trial, a feature that was continued on the subsequent K^{A} and K^{B} classes.

== In service ==
Upon entering service the class were used on heavy freight and express passenger trains. The K class were best known for spectacular running on the mountainous parts of the North Island Main Trunk in the central North Island and on the Marton - New Plymouth Line around Wanganui. In particular, they took over from the X class locomotives which had been used particularly on the Raurimu Spiral.

While generally reliable, trouble at first was encountered with the long-travel Walschaerts valve gear, and with the plate frames. While the valve gear problems were largely solved by reducing travel from the original 8 inches to 7 1/4 inches, the plate frames continued to crack especially in the region of the firebox. While many repairs were undertaken to fix the frames, this problem was only solved by replacing the frame with the new design constructed for the K^{A} and K^{B} classes. This was only done as the replacement was required; as a result not all of the class received the new frames.

After the Second World War, a coal shortage occurred and NZR converted a large number of locomotives to oil burning. The K class were a prime candidate due to the large size of the grate. The conversion process was concurrent with that of the K^{A} class.

As time went on members of the K class gained improvements and additions from the K^{A} class, and some locomotives had the Westinghouse cross-compound pump added in place of the original twin single-stage pumps.

== Withdrawal and disposal ==
In 1954, mainline dieselisation began and progressively displaced the K class, especially as the D^{A} class locomotives introduced from 1955. Some of the class were rebuilt with new frames in 1955-57 but most of the class were in storage by 1961 and the decision was made that year the class would receive no more A-grade overhauls, other than K 911. The withdrawal of the class began in 1964, and all members exited service by 1967. Three of the class were retained by Hutt Workshops for use as stationary boilers, replacing three Garratt boilers from the G class. These three heavily stripped members of the class lasted in such use service until 1988 when they were auctioned off.

== Preserved locomotives ==
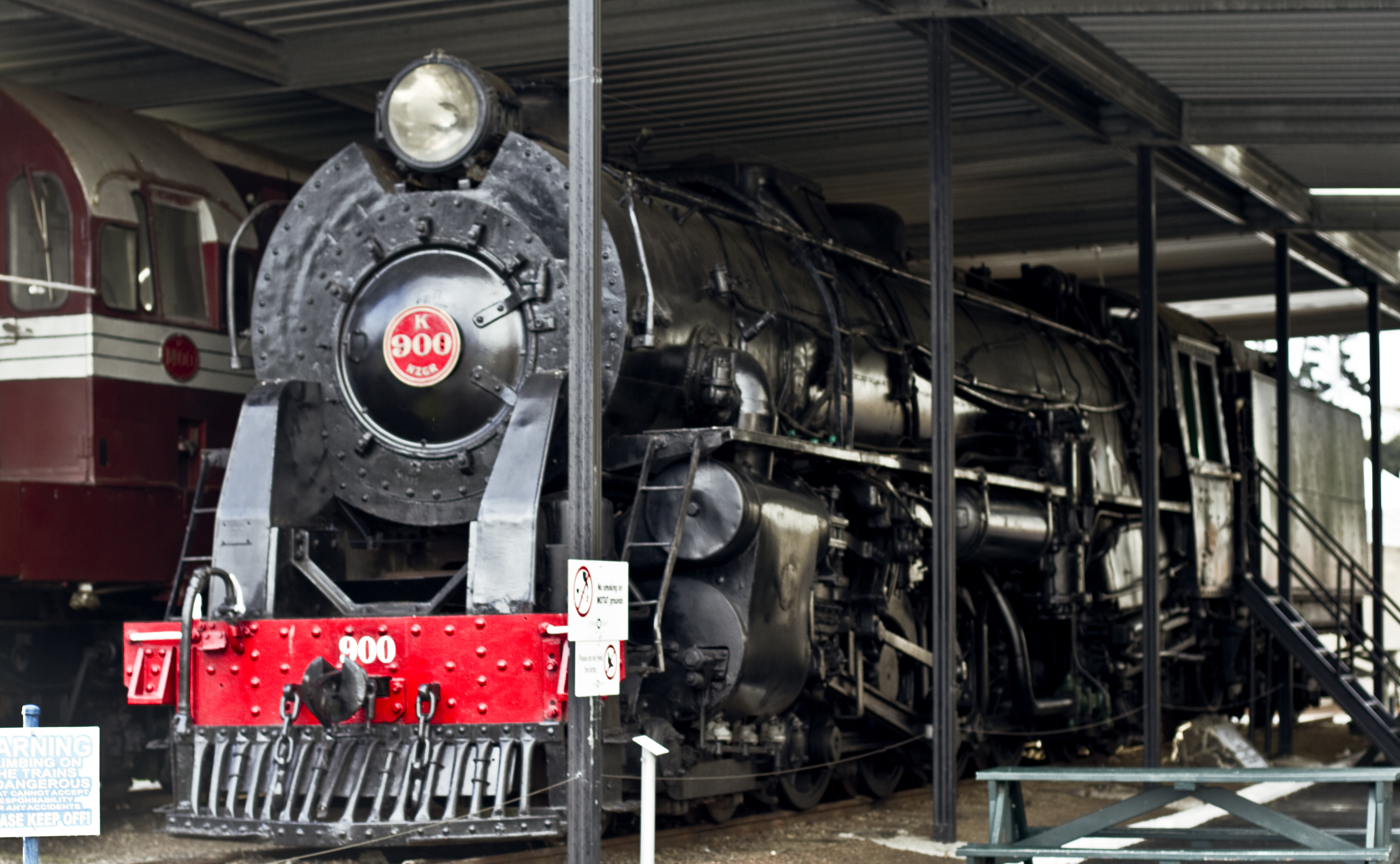
K 900 on static display at MOTAT, Auckland.

The K 900 was originally delivered to Pacific Steel Ltd to be scrapped. The Project Team assigned to build a new 27 stand/single strand rod mill decided to save it. The project team, led by Malcolm Dawson, persuaded all the contractors and suppliers who were building the mill to help save the K 900 for free. In March 1969, the locomotive was moved to a safe location at the works entrance of the mill for easy public access.

K 900 was donated to MOTAT in 1975 when it was replaced by D^{F} 1301. It was then transported to the main MOTAT site and placed at the railway pavilion in the company of A^{B} 832, F 180 Meg Merrilies, J 1236, W^{W} 491, and diesel-electric locomotive D^{A} 1400. It has remained on display at MOTAT since then, initially in the open, but later under a shelter roof.

Physically, K 900 retains its original boiler, tender and plate frame, the latter showing evidence of extensive welding repairs due to the weak nature of the original construction. It appears much as it was when withdrawn, with the recessed K-style headlight, but with a K^{A} style funnel and a cross-compound pump with twin air reservoirs mounted under the front compressor shields. Sometime between 2014 and 2018, K 900 was relocated to the workshop at the Western Springs Railway, and is currently undergoing preservation work. There have been plans to restore K 900 to working order but so far none have come to be.

NZR converted three locomotives - K's 911, 917, and 921 - in 1967 for use as stationary boilers at Hutt Workshops. They continued in this use until 1988, when the boiler house was removed and the hulks were auctioned off. Ian Welch of the Mainline Steam Heritage Trust purchased K 911, the most complete of the hulks, while Steam Incorporated purchased K 917, paired with the tender from K 928, as a potential spare boiler for K^{A} 945. No buyer was found for K 921, which had been paired with the tender from K^{A} 939, and it was later scrapped, although the tender and inner firebox, and other parts, including driving wheels, were acquired by Steam Incorporated.

It was announced in 2013 that K 911 will be the next major restoration project at Mainline Steam's Wellington depot at Plimmerton. K 911 retained its cylinders and was noted shortly after purchase in 1998 at their temporary Gracefield depot as having been stripped down for an overhaul. This was put on hold prior to the move to Plimmerton, at which point the boiler was lowered back onto the overhauled frames for storage. Some of its parts were borrowed for use on K^{A} 942, then under restoration at the Glenbrook Vintage Railway in South Auckland.

K 917 has been stored at Steam Incorporated's Paekākāriki depot since its arrival in 2001. It is heavily stripped and comprises the driving wheels, a replacement heavy frame from the 1950s, boiler, fire and smokebox, and the tender from K 928.
