= Feedwater heater =

Power plant component

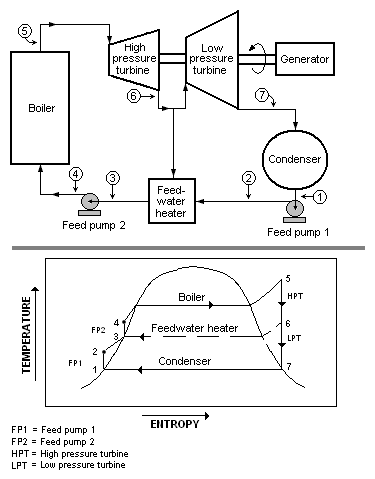
A Rankine cycle with two steam turbines and a single open feedwater heater.

A feedwater heater is a power plant component used to pre-heat water delivered to a steam generating boiler. Preheating the feedwater reduces the irreversibilities involved in steam generation and therefore improves the thermodynamic efficiency of the system. This reduces plant operating costs and also helps to avoid thermal shock to the boiler metal when the feedwater is introduced back into the steam cycle.

In a steam power plant (usually modeled as a modified Rankine cycle), feedwater heaters allow the feedwater to be brought up to the saturation temperature very gradually. This minimizes the inevitable irreversibilities associated with heat transfer to the working fluid (water). See the article on the second law of thermodynamics for a further discussion of such irreversibilities.

== Cycle discussion and explanation ==
The energy used to heat the feedwater is usually derived from steam extracted between the stages of the steam turbine. Therefore, the steam that would be used to perform expansion work in the turbine (and therefore generate power) is not utilized for that purpose. The percentage of the total cycle steam mass flow used for the feedwater heater is termed the extraction fraction and must be carefully optimized for maximum power plant thermal efficiency since increasing this fraction causes a decrease in turbine power output.

Feedwater heaters can be open or closed heat exchangers. An open heat exchanger is one in which extracted steam is allowed to mix with the feedwater. This kind of heater will normally require a feed pump at both the feed inlet and outlet since the pressure in the heater is between the boiler pressure and the condenser pressure. A deaerator is a special case of the open feedwater heater which is specifically designed to remove non-condensable gases from the feedwater.

Closed feedwater heaters are typically shell and tube heat exchangers where the feedwater passes throughout the tubes and is heated by turbine extraction steam. These do not require separate pumps before and after the heater to boost the feedwater to the pressure of the extracted steam as with an open heater. However, the extracted steam (which is most likely almost fully condensed after heating the feedwater) must then be throttled to the condenser pressure, an isenthalpic process that results in some entropy gain with a slight penalty on overall cycle efficiency:

Many power plants incorporate a number of feedwater heaters and may use both open and closed components. Feedwater heaters are used in both fossil- and nuclear-fueled power plants.

== Economizer ==
An economizer serves a similar purpose to a feedwater heater, but is technically different as it does not use cycle steam for heating. In fossil-fuel plants, the economizer uses the lowest-temperature flue gas from the furnace to heat the water before it enters the boiler proper. This allows for the heat transfer between the furnace and the feedwater to occur across a smaller average temperature gradient (for the steam generator as a whole). System efficiency is therefore further increased when viewed with respect to actual energy content of the fuel.

Most nuclear power plants do not have an economizer. However, the Combustion Engineering System 80+ nuclear plant design and its evolutionary successors (e.g. Korea Electric Power Corporation's APR-1400) incorporate an integral feedwater economizer. This economizer preheats the steam generator feedwater at the steam generator inlet using the lowest-temperature primary coolant.

== Testing ==
A widely use Code for the procedures, direction, and guidance for determining the thermo-hydraulic performance of a closed feedwater heater is the ASME PTC 12.1 Feedwater Heater Standard.

== See also ==
- Fossil fuel power station
- Thermal power station

== ASME Codes ==
The American Society of Mechanical Engineers (ASME), publishes the following Code:

- PTC 4.4 Gas Turbine Heat Recovery Steam Generators
