= List of New Zealand railway museums and heritage lines =

This is a list of groups involved in Railway preservation in New Zealand.

== Members of the Federation of Rail Organisations New Zealand ==
Members of the Federation of Rail Organisations of New Zealand: Railway museums, heritage lines, societies, clubs, trusts, etc., in New Zealand. This also include model engineering clubs and narrow gauge railways.

=== North Island ===
Northland

- Bay of Islands Vintage Railway Charitable Trust
- Whangarei Steam & Model Railway Club
- Whangarei Model Engineering Club

Auckland

- Mainline Steam Trust
- Glenbrook Vintage Railway
- Railway Enthusiasts Society
- The Waitakere Tramline Society
- Watercare Services
- Western Springs Railway Museum of Transport and Technology
- Western Springs Tramway Museum of Transport and Technology
- Auckland Society of Model Engineers Incorporated
- Manukau Live Steamers

Waikato / Coromandel

- Bush Tramway Club
- DF 1501 Restoration Charitable Trust
- Driving Creek Railway
- Goldfields Railway
- Victoria Battery Tramway Society
- Te Aroha Mountain Railway
- Thames Small Gauge Railway Society
- Hamilton Model Engineers
- Cambridge Model Engineering Society Inc
- Waihi Small Gauge Railway

Bay of Plenty

- Rotorua - Ngongotaha Rail Trust
- Geyserland Express Trust
- Tauranga Pioneer Museum
- Tauranga Model Marine and Engineering Club
- Eastern Bay of Plenty Model Engineering Society

East Cape / Hawke's Bay

- East Coast Museum of Technology
- Gisborne City Vintage Railway
- Hawkes Bay Steam Society
- Ormondville Rail Preservation Group
- Hawkes Bay Model Engineering Society
- Havelock North Live Steamers & Associates

Taranaki

- Hooterville Heritage Charitable Trust(No longer operating)
- Pioneer Village Soc Inc
- Waitara Railway Preservation Society
- New Plymouth Society of Model & Experimental Engineers

Wairarapa

- Friends of the Fell Society Fell Engine Museum Featherston
- Pahiatua Railcar Society
- Wairarapa Railway Restoration Society, based at the Carterton railway station

Manawatū

- Feilding and District Steam Rail Society
- Steamrail Wanganui Incorporated
- Palmerston North Model Engineering Club Inc
- Esplanade Scenic Railway

Wellington

- Craven Crane Preservation Group
- Department of Conservation
- Mainline Steam Trust
- New Zealand Railway and Locomotive Society (or see website)
- Rail Heritage Trust of New Zealand
- Rimutaka Incline Railway Heritage Trust
- Silver Stream Railway
- Steam Incorporated (Engine Shed - Paekakariki)
- Wellington and Manawatu Railway Trust
- Wellington Tramway Museum (or see website)
- Paekakariki Station Precinct Trust
- Wellington CableCar Museum
- Kapiti Miniature Railway & Model Engineering Society Inc
- Featherston Miniature Fell Society
- Maidstone Model Engineering Society
- Hutt Valley Model Engineering Society

=== South Island ===
Nelson / Marlborough

- Blenheim Riverside Railway
- Nelson Railway Society (Founders Heritage Park)
- Picton Society of Model Engineers
- Marlborough Associated Modellers Society
- Nelson Society of Modellers

Westland

- Charming Creek Railway
- Reefton Historic Trust Board
- West Coast Historical & Mechanical Society, Shantytown
- Westport Railway Preservation Society

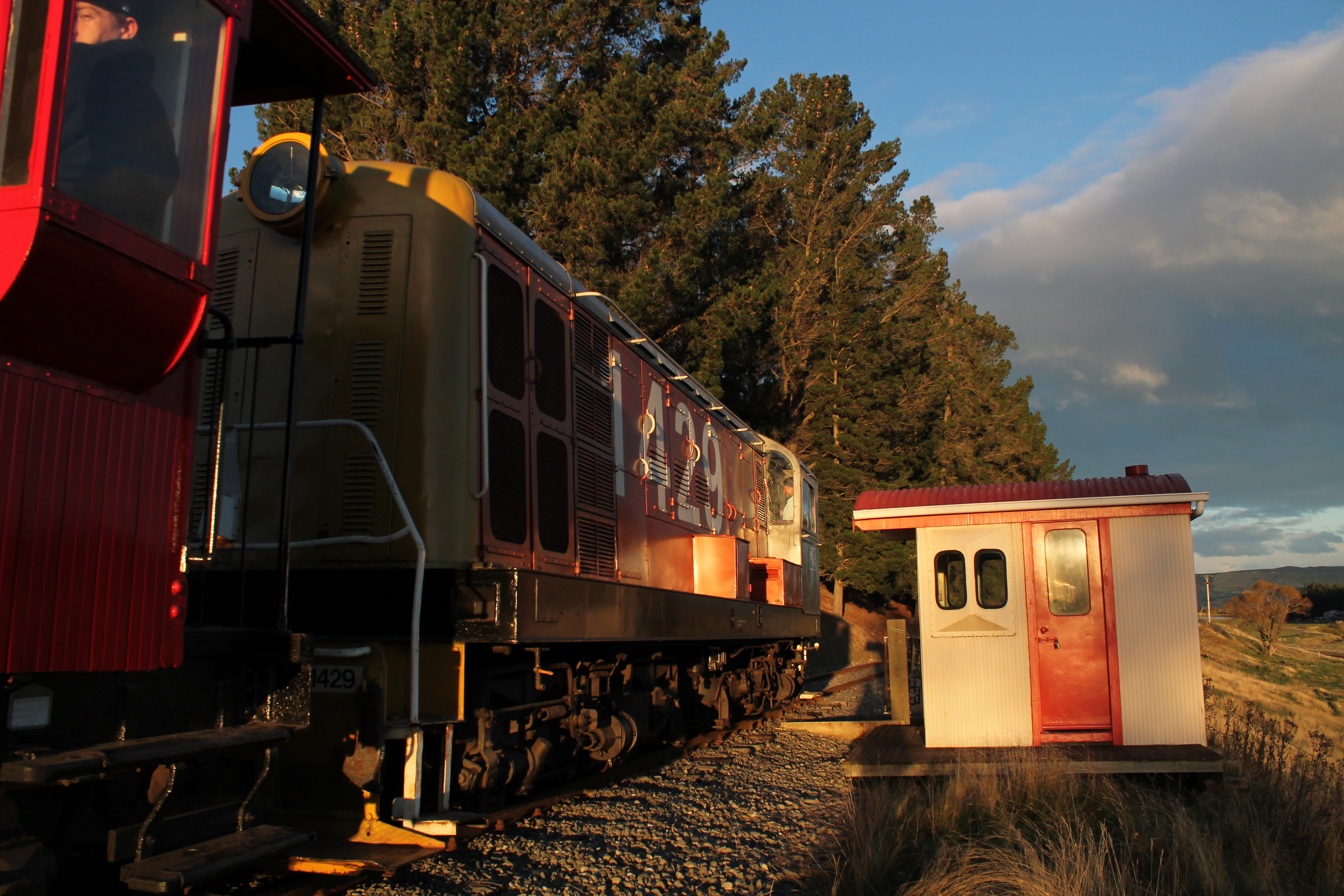
English Electric De 1429 at Gate 1 in the sunset.

Canterbury

- Mainline Steam Heritage Trust
- Ashburton Railway & Preservation Society
- Canterbury Railway Society (Ferrymead Railway)
- Canterbury Steam Preservation Society (McLeans Island Steamscene)
- Christchurch Tramway Ltd
- Diesel Traction Group
- Heritage Tramways Trust
- Midland Rail Heritage Trust
- Midland Railway Company (NZ) Ltd
- National Railway Museum of New Zealand
- Pleasant Point Museum and Railway
- Tramway Historical Society (Ferrymead Tramway)
- Weka Pass Railway
- Canterbury Society of Model & Experimental Engineers
- Christchurch Live Steamers
- Ashburton Steam Model & Engineering Club
- South Canterbury Model Engineers

Otago

- Oamaru Steam & Railway Restoration Society
- Otago Excursion Train Trust (part owners of Dunedin Railways)
- Otago Railway & Locomotive Society (Ocean Beach Railway)
- Project Steam (Dunedin) Inc
- The Otago Model Engineering Society
- Otago Miniature Road & Rail Society Inc

Southland

- Ohai Railway Board Heritage Trust
- Gore Model Engineering Club
- Southland Society of Model Engineers

=== Cook Islands ===
- Rarotonga Steam Railway in Cook Islands

== Other organisations ==
- Kingston Flyer
- Ferrymead Heritage Park
- RM 133 Trust
- Otago Settlers Museum has two steam engines on display

== See also ==
- List of museums in New Zealand
