= Glenbrook Vintage Railway =

Heritage railway operating in New Zealand

Coordinates: 37.2083°S 174.7856°E

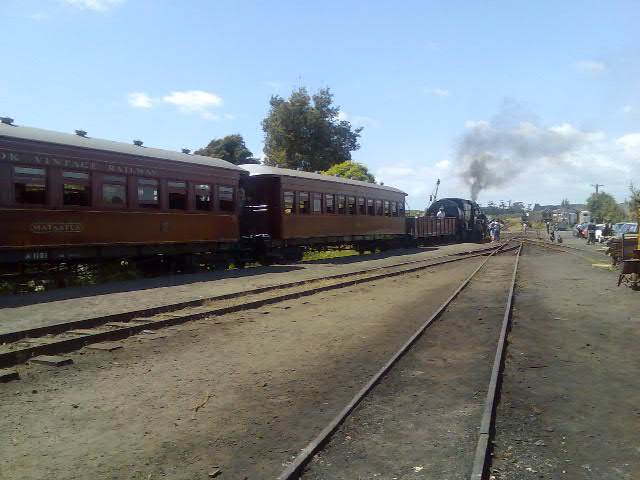
- J^{A} 1250 leads a passenger train on the Glenbrook Vintage Railway at the railway's workshops, 3 January 2008.
- Locale: Glenbrook, New Zealand
- Terminus: Glenbrook and Waiuku

Commercial operations
- Name: Part of the Waiuku branch line
- Built by: New Zealand Government Railways
- Original gauge: 1,067 mm (3 ft 6 in)

Preserved operations
- Owned by: Glenbrook Vintage Railway Trust Board
- Stations: Five
- Length: 7.5 km
- Preserved gauge: 1,067 mm (3 ft 6 in)

Commercial history
- Opened: 10 May 1922
- Closed: 31 December 1967

Preservation history
- Reopened: 23 October 1977

The Glenbrook Vintage Railway (GVR) is a heritage steam railway in Glenbrook, New Zealand.

The GVR is run by a trust board of three trustees elected and appointed from Railway Enthusiasts Society (RES) membership. The board appoints a general manager who is responsible for day-to-day operation. The 7.4 km (4.6 mi) long railway carries up to 30,000 passengers during the normal operating season, which is from October to June, and is also available for charter throughout the year.

The railway is staffed and maintained by volunteers and RES membership provides automatic access to all activities as a volunteer. Special Events are often held, such as "Counties Energy Christmas Lights - Trains at Night", the "Day Out With Thomas" weekends, Railfan Days (with display freight trains and other unique consists), Country and Western days and night steam runs.

== History ==
The GVR is based on part of the old Waiuku branch line which opened in 1922 and closed from Glenbrook to Waiuku in 1967.

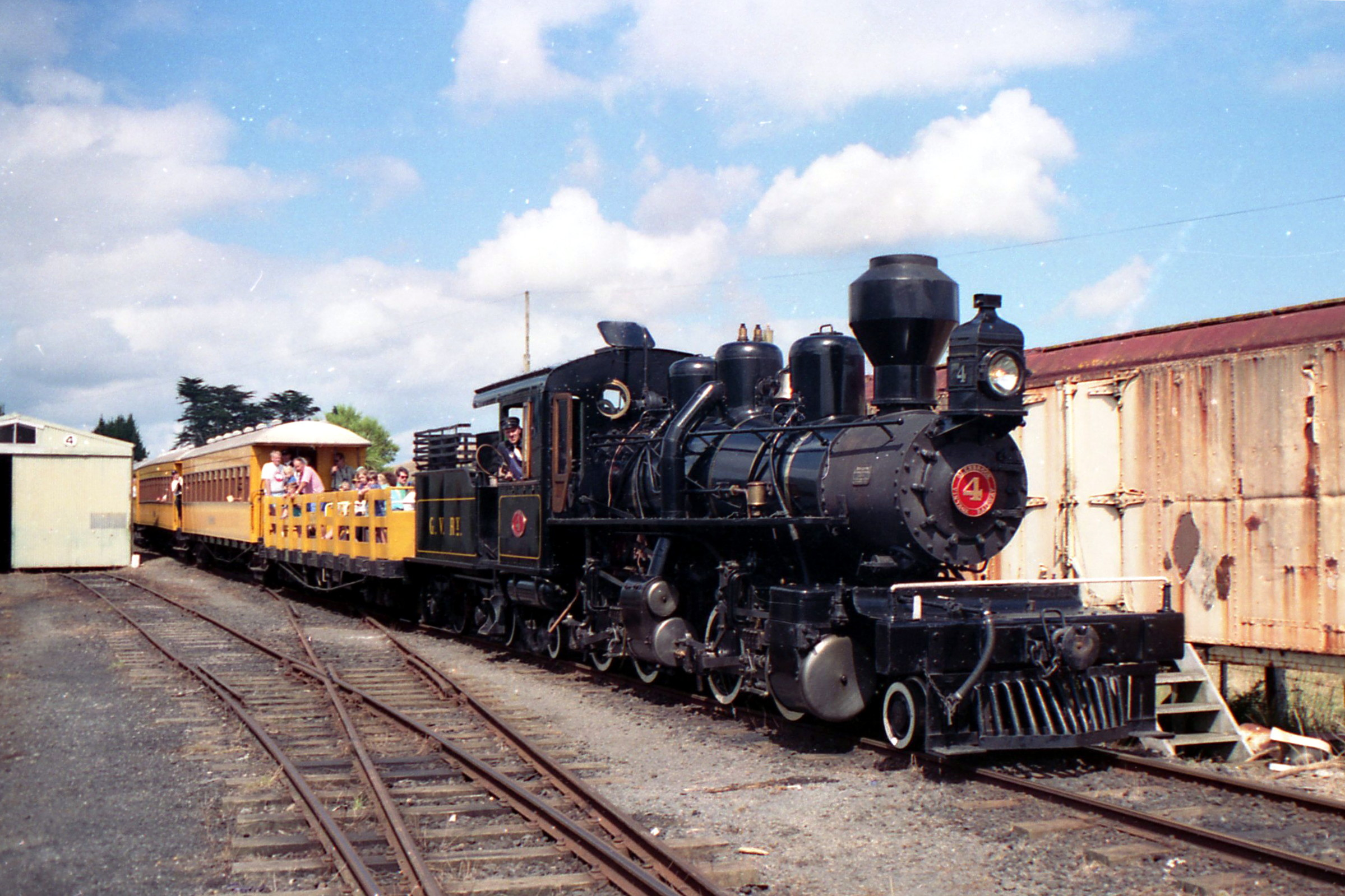
1912 Alco Mallet No. 7 (GVR No. 4)

The initial concept for a steam-powered tourist railway was initiated when the New Zealand Government Railways announced the closure of the line, which was a popular route for excursions operated by the RES. Re-construction of the GVR began in 1970, slashing back gorse that had overgrown the line, renewing rail, and building the Pukeoware Depot and the terminus at Glenbrook.

The acquisition of items of rolling stock included "delivery" rail-tours, bringing the steam locomotive fleet from the South Island back to Auckland for use at Glenbrook. Carriages were sourced out of stock being retired from the Auckland commuter network at the time, and in some cases (such as carriage "Manukura"), where the item of rolling stock had sentimental value to the members of the RES.

In October 1977, the railway opened between Glenbrook and Pukeoware. Early services used the line's ex-Ministry of Works Ruston diesel (later GVR No. 3), a motor trolley, and several material trolleys fitted with longitudinal seats. For the first proper services, steam locomotive No. 1 (formerly W^{W} 480) was used, with two carriages, a guard's van and an open car.

In April 1985, J^{A} 1250 (along with K^{A} 945) hauled the first mainline steam excursion from Auckland to Wellington and return. This was the first steam excursion to run after NZR lifted their ban on steam traction.

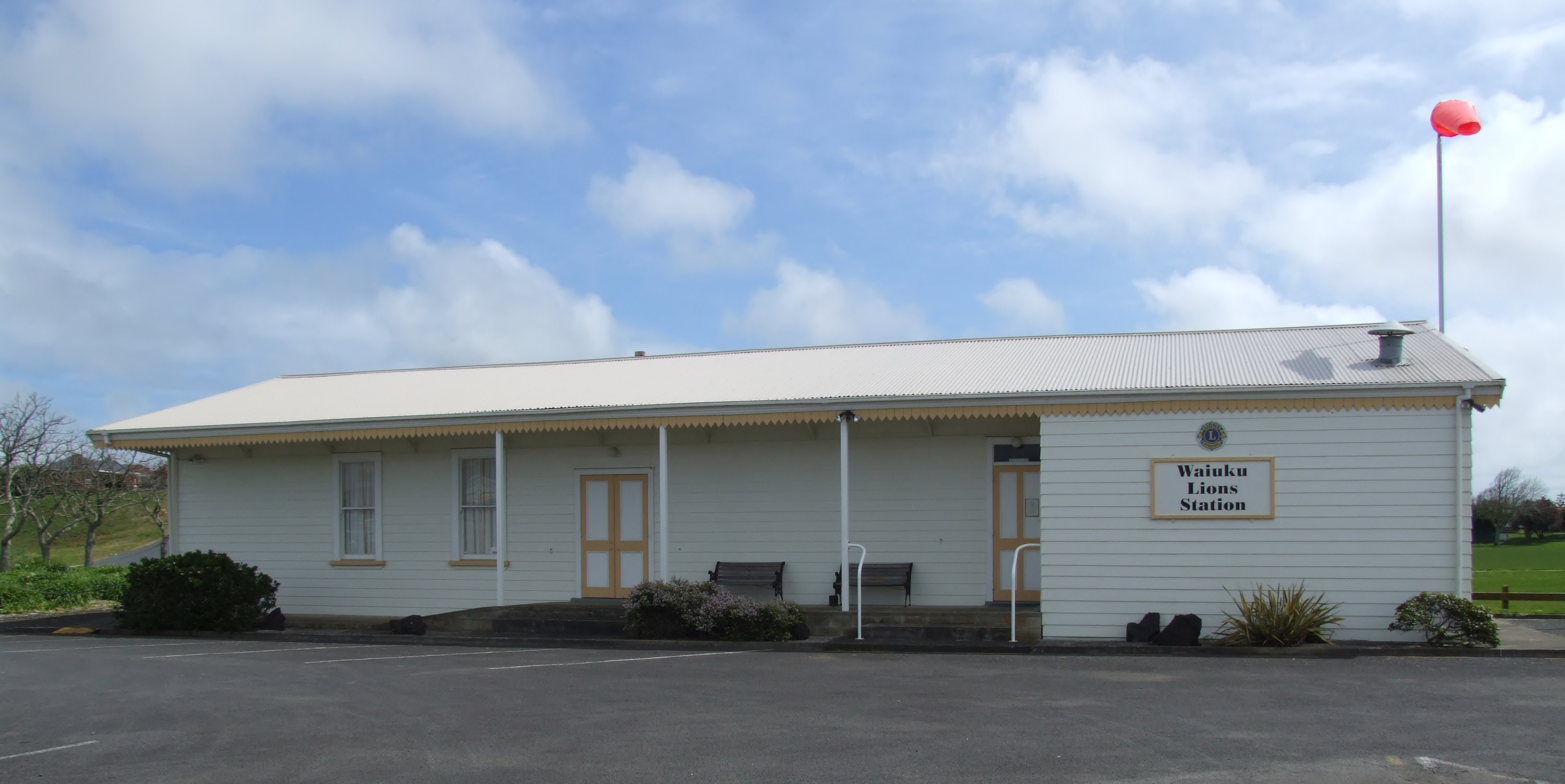
NZR The Old Waiuku Railway Station

In December 1986, an extension was completed to Fernleigh, 6 kilometres (3.7 mi) from Glenbrook. On 5 December 1986, DC4444 and six Cityrail branded carriages made the run from Auckland to Fernleigh (including the GVR section). The next day a special excursion train ran from Auckland, carrying Prime Minister David Lange, who presided at the opening on 6 December 1986. J^{A} 1250 and D^{A} 529 hauled a large public excursion out to Glenbrook station from Auckland dubbed the "Sunset Coast Express". Acquisitions and improvements to track and structures occurred during the late 1980s and 1990s. In 1995, plans were laid out for the extension of the railway line from the Fernleigh Terminal into the town of Waiuku itself. Planning, lobbying public support and fundraising continued until the major physical works began in 1999. As the original Waiuku station and yards, to the south of the town, had been developed following the closure of the line in 1968 and the old station became a Lions Club in 1991, the decision was made to have the new Waiuku Station at Tamakae Reserve, which got a resource consent in 2003.

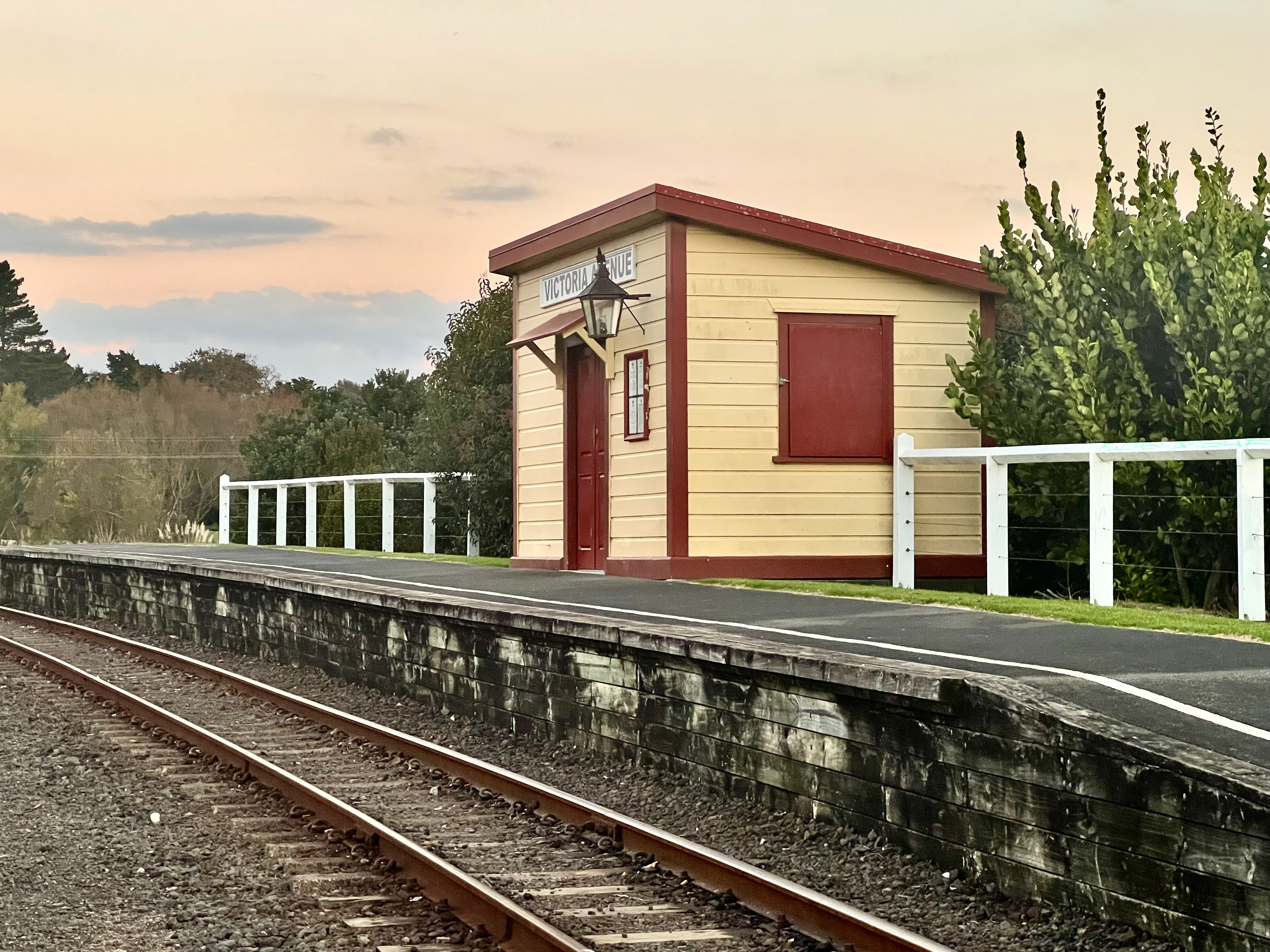
Waiuku Victoria Avenue railway station

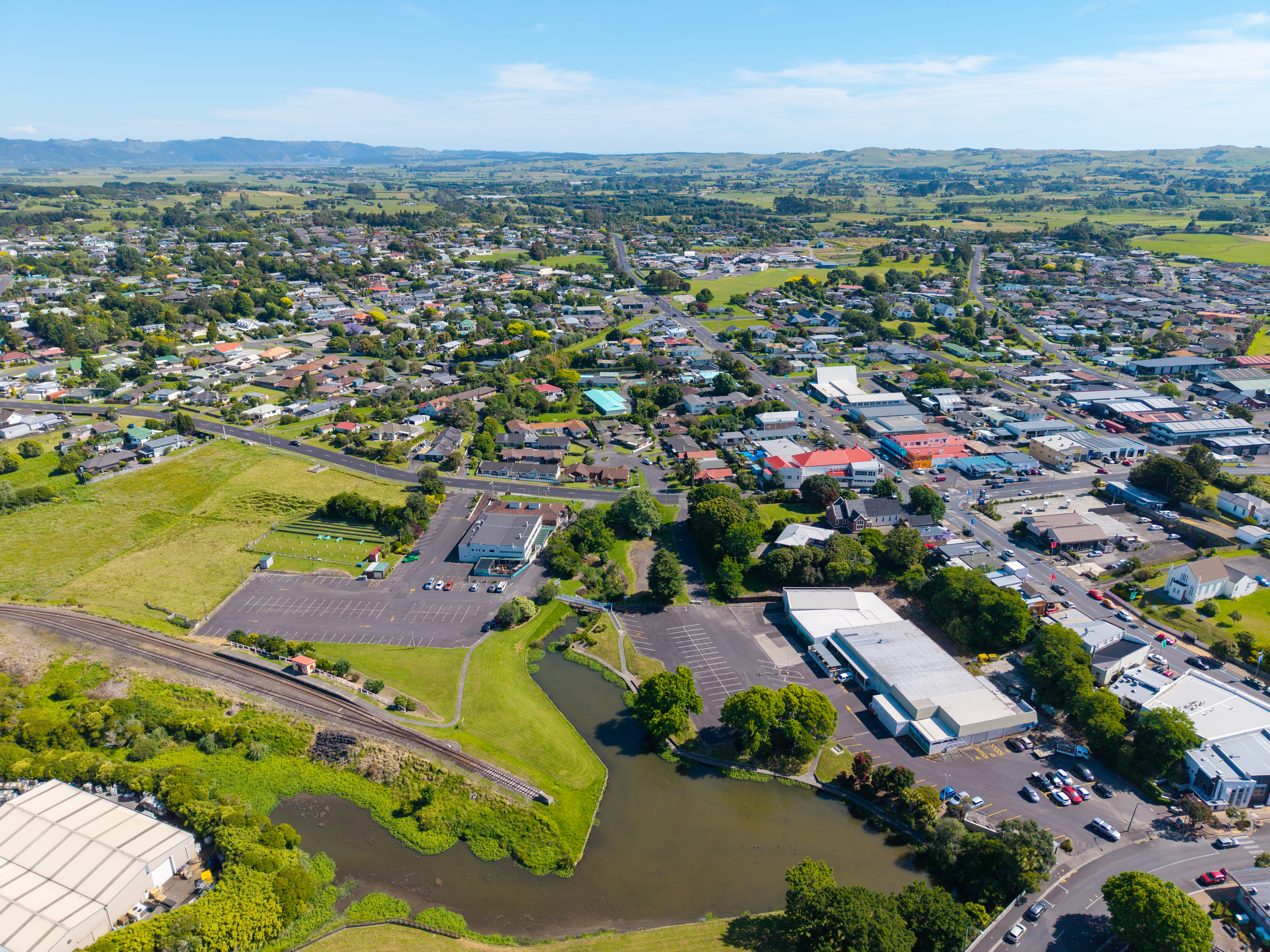
The railway at Waiuku ends at a concrete block. The line used to run straight from the left to the old station (back centre)

As part of the work, a new bridge would be required to reach Tamakae Reserve, and so a temporary station was opened at Victoria Avenue in Waiuku, just behind the Cosmopolitan Club. When the final extension is completed, it is intended that Victoria Ave will be retained. Member preview trains ran on Easter Saturday 2010, and at Labour Weekend 2010 the new route was opened to regular service by former Waiuku Mayor Kevan Lawrence and Mayor of Auckland Len Brown. The heritage 1922 concrete bridge known as Black Bridge has been strengthened to allow trains to operate beneath it, and laying of newly welded rail onto concrete sleepers (a first at the railway) has been completed. Work continues on planning the requirements of the final extension to Tamakae reserve.

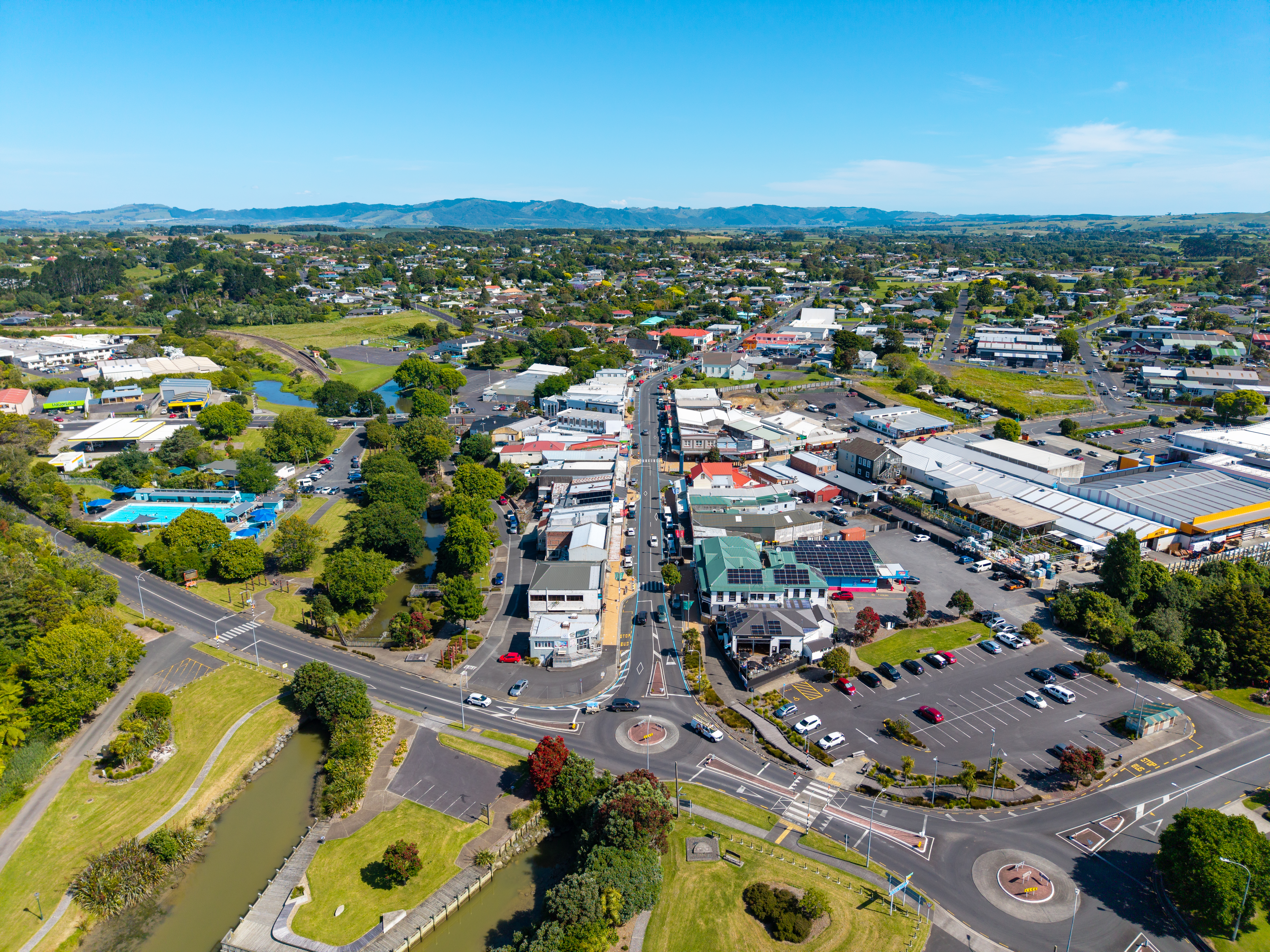
A plan approved in 2003 envisages a bridge from Victoria Avenue (left back) station to reach Tamakae Reserve (front left)

Towards the end of the 2010s, the railway became increasingly difficult to maintain and operate with rising costs and a changing market. In 2018, the GVR hired its first full-time General Manager, followed by an increasing number of staff in the years to come.

During Covid and persistent lockdowns, the railway was forced to look at alternative sources of income, the end result being picking up contracting and other external work, as well as expanding into the touring market with its main line set. The increasing popularity of the "Counties Energy Christmas Lights - Trains at Night" event (with 55,000 total attendees in 2024) has also solidified the railways position as New Zealand's third-busiest rail operator.

As of 2025, the GVR operate a wide range of steam & diesel main line excursions and tours, overseas tours, First-Class and Steam Experiences, private Charters for other tour operators, three annual big events (Day Out with Thomas, Matariki Night Lights & Christmas Lights), and assist other rail operators by supplying rail vehicles, crews and staff training.

The millionth passenger was carried on 7 January 2007 and is approaching two million.

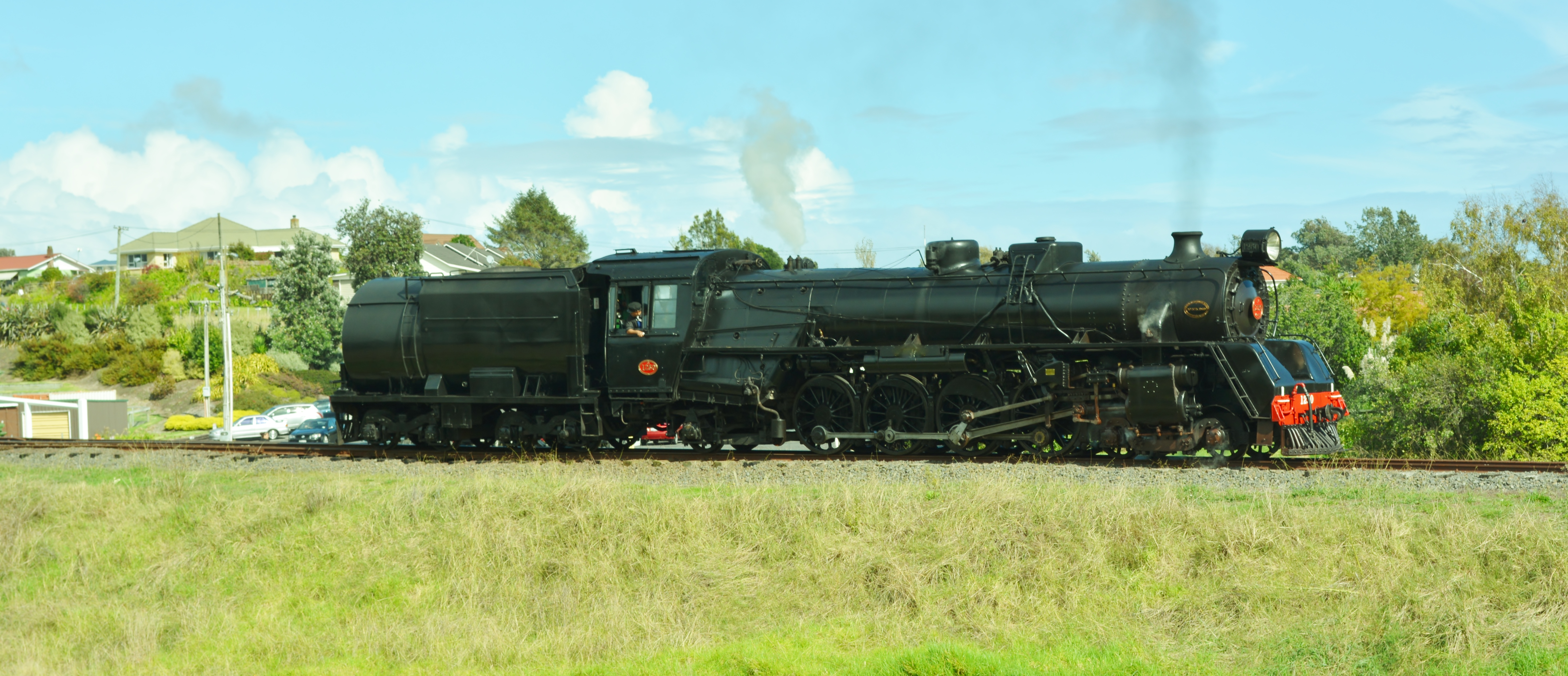
J^{A} 1250 at Waiuku, 19 April 2014

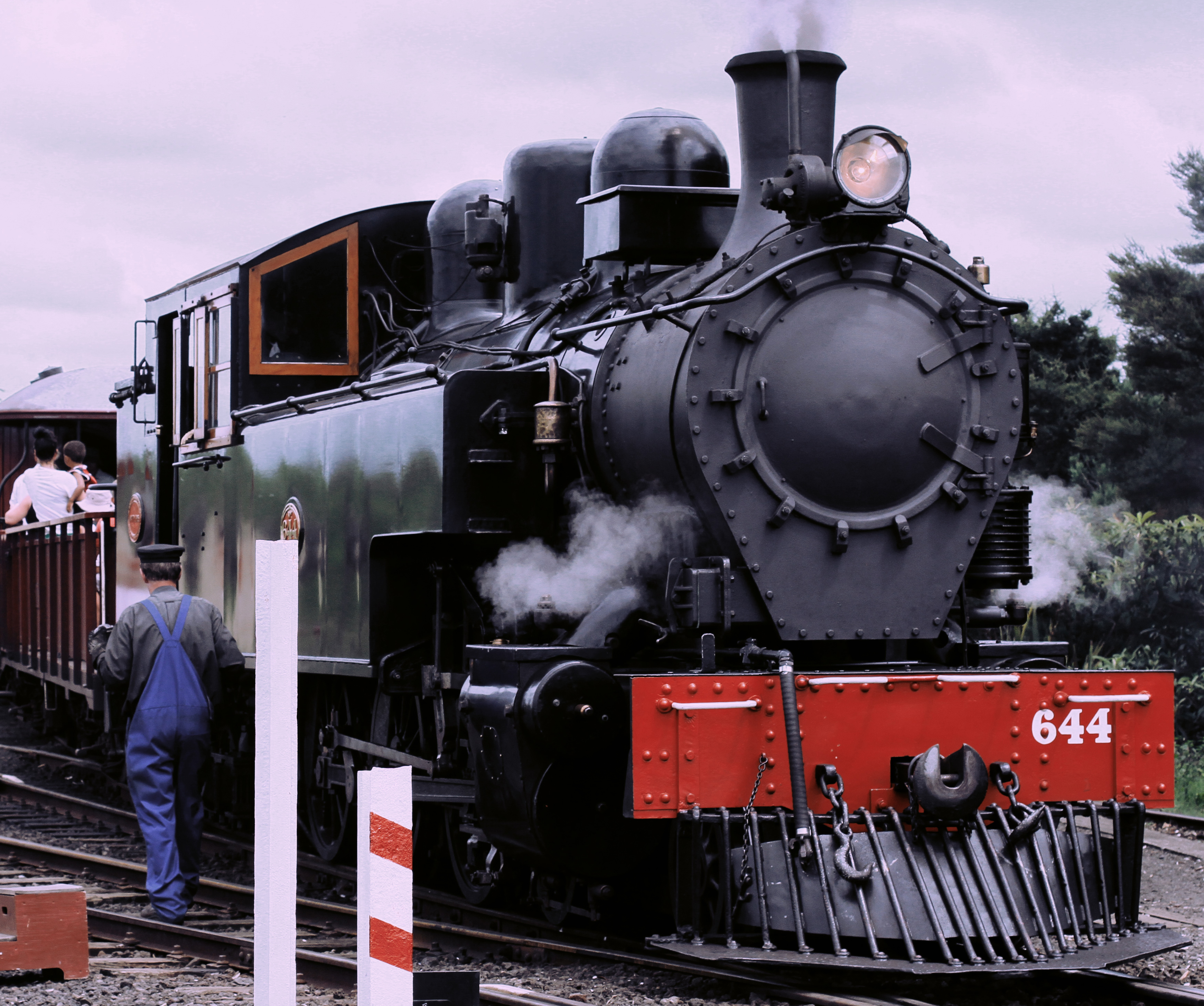
W^{W} 644 at Glenbrook Railway Station, 13 February 2011

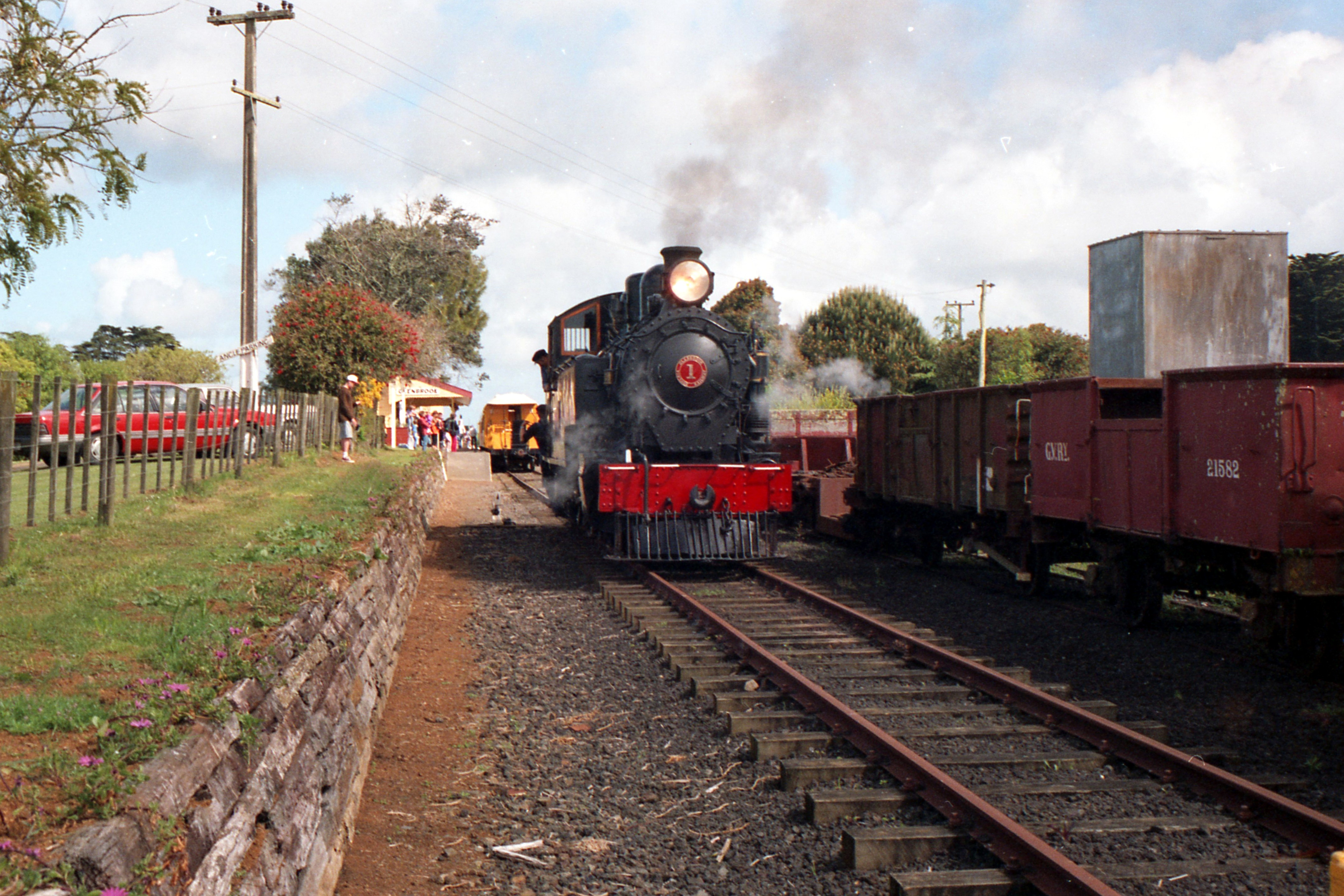
W^{W} 480 (GVR No. 1) at Glenbrook Railway Station,

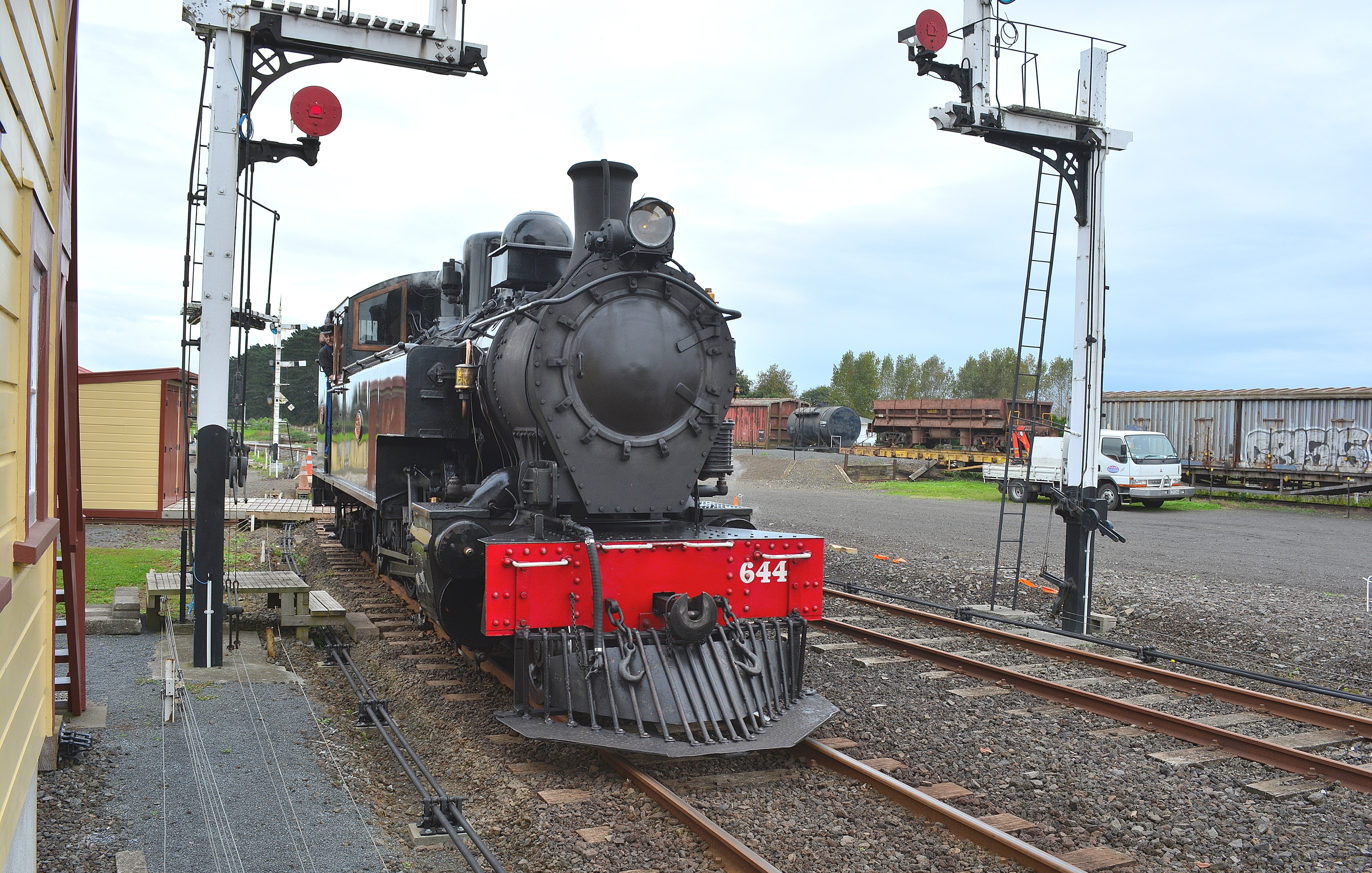
W^{W}644 at Glenbrook, 10 April 2016

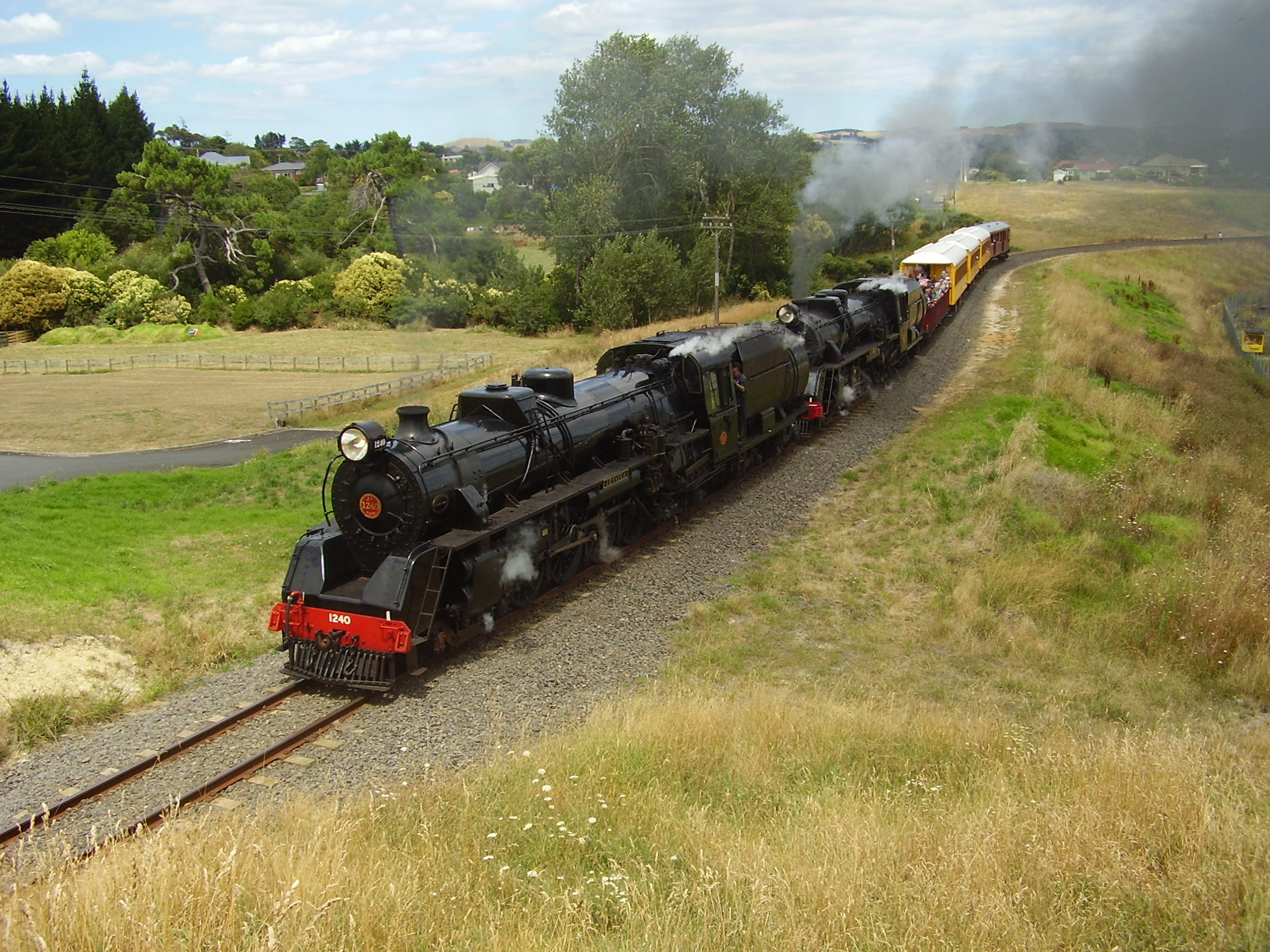
J^{A} 1240 and J^{A} 1250 at Waiuku, 26 January 2013

== Operations ==
=== Standard operating days ===
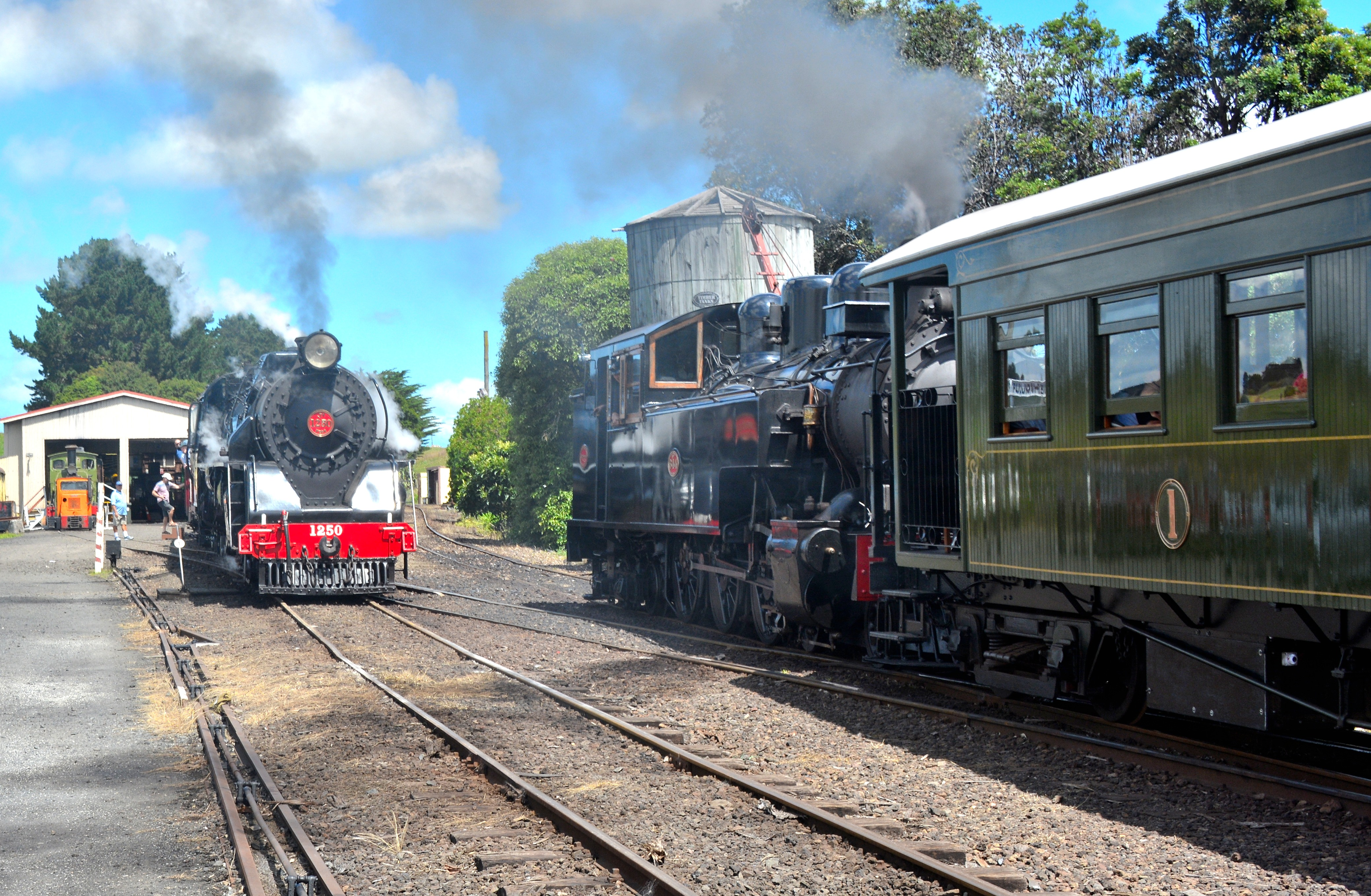
W^{W} 644 passing J^{A} 1250 Diana at the Pukeoware depot in February 2017.

The railway operates selected Sundays and public holiday weekend (except on Christmas Day and Boxing Day) between Labour weekend and Queen's Birthday weekend.

Steam train services depart from Glenbrook every 90 minutes between 11 am and 4 pm, with a round trip taking approximately 60 minutes. The return journey consists of a 20-minute non-stop run from Glenbrook to Victoria Avenue, a five-minute stop where the engine runs round the train, a ten-minute run back to Shakespear Road, where a 10-minute photo run is performed, then a run to Glenbrook via a water stop at the Waitangi Water Tower.

When the train is not at Glenbrook station hand jigger rides are available within the station yard and motor jigger rides are available to Morley Road level crossing, a round trip of four kilometres.

=== Special operating days ===
During the course of an operating season, special events are organised featuring a range of unique operations. These include – Christmas Lights, Lego Weekends, Steam Festivals, Easter Celebrations, Day Out With Thomas Weekends, Matariki Night Lights and events specific to each operating season.

==== Counties Energy Christmas Lights - Trains at Night ====
The Christmas Lights - Trains at Night event was initiated in December 2018. It involves the trains and Glenbrook station site lit up with Christmas Lights, with the train providing "push-pull" trips every 30 minutes to Pukeoware from 6pm to 10.30pm, usually with W^{W} 480 and DBR 1295. Most recently due to demand, a second train has been added, operating every 30 minutes on the Mission Bush Branch Line from Glenbrook to Mission Bush, usually hauled by W^{W} 644 and DBR 1254.

==== Day out with Thomas ====
One of the most popular events operated by the railway, two trains up to six carriages long depart Glenbrook half-hourly between 10 am and 4 pm, usually.

A smaller "shuttle train" operates in the siding linking the railway to the KiwiRail network. Often hauled by small diesel locomotive "Basil" in earlier years, the service has also been operated by W^{W} 480 "Terry the Tank Engine" and more recently by "Thomas the Tank Engine" – a visitor to the railway. The GVR's "Thomas" is Bagnall No. 2475, owned by the Mainline Steam Trust and formerly used at the Tomoana Freezing Works, Hastings.

Double-decker buses, traction engines, vintage motor cars and other related displays have also been presented at these events over the years.

On "Day Out With Thomas" weekends, trains only travel to Fernleigh, before returning to Pukeoware and Glenbrook.

==== Railfan Day ====
The first Railfan Day was held in February 1996, specifically a celebration to dedicate the National Network fleet van FM 1133 to the memory of past long-time treasurer Arthur Tichener and celebrate the completion of the overhaul of historic carriage C 472. A variety of passenger and mixed trains was run culminating in an impressive steam train triple-headed by Silver Stream Railway's C 847, W^{W} 480 and GVR No. 4, the ex-Taupo Totara Timber Company (Mallet).

Since then various similar events have been held with special passenger and freight workings featuring a range of historic rolling stock and locomotives. These events usually run with resident locomotives and rolling stock, although visiting locomotives have occasionally made appearances, such as the Museum of Transport & Technology's (MOTAT) L 507, which attended the 2009 Railfan Festival.

==== Steam traction festivals ====
Steam festivals combine displays of various steam-powered vehicles on one major site. The Glenbrook Vintage Railway staged its first festival in Easter 2002, to celebrate its Silver Jubilee. A myriad of visiting railway locomotives, steam boats, miniature locomotives, static steam engines and even a steam-powered car were features. Trains operated on a half-hourly basis each of the four days of the festival and the visiting Pleasant Point Model T railcar also operated in the schedule.

Two DC locomotives pulled a special train on Saturday from Wellsford to Glenbrook and back (and associated empty runs from Otahuhu to Wellsford and back before and after the passenger service) to bring patrons to the event and the following day, Mainline Steam's J 1211 hauled a train from Auckland, whilst J^{B} 1236 returned the train to Auckland. Numerous steam train runs also operated across the Mission Bush branch line to Pukekohe on the Sunday also.

A second steam festival was held in February 2007, incorporating a visit from 7nhp Burrell 'Scenic Special' showman's engine Quo Vadis (wrks. No. 3938) and associated carousel. The weekend also celebrated the re-launch of W^{W} 644 into service after 37 years in storage and overhaul. This event was much lower-key, with no visiting engines attending this event.

A third steam festival took place at Waitangi weekend 2009. The opening event was a special evening on Thursday 5 February. Historic 19th century visiting tank engine L 207 (from MOTAT) operated a demonstration freight train (including a rare mainline appearance by historic 3-axle carriage C 472), followed by the recreation of an original New Zealand "trial rail-motor" from the beginning of the 20th century (which comprised one small tank engine pulling one of four purpose built 60 ft car/vans). The train comprised L 207 and the recently restored dining car van "Kurahaupo" (A^{F} 1182), which was one of the original purpose-built trial rail-motor carriages.

Between Friday 6 February and Sunday 8 February, there were many activities including ploughing, steam boats, steam cars, stalls, heritage displays and equipment. Steam trains ran half-hourly throughout the weekend including appearances by L 207, W^{W} 644, J^{A} 1250 and Mainline Steam's J^{A}1275 which had arrived under her own power from Parnell on Saturday morning. W^{W} 480 was on standby duties outside the depot along with a number of locomotives normally in storage or awaiting overhaul such as recent arrivals A 423 and W^{AB} 800.

A fourth festival took place on the weekend of 23 and 24 March 2013, which included the first public showing of a half scale replica Newcomen engine, built by the Auckland Steam Engine Society. This engine stands 5.5 metres tall and is based on the engines built 300 years before at the dawn of the industrial age to pump water from mines. Six locomotives took part in the passenger hauling during the weekend. There were displays of vintage machinery including traction engines under steam. A vintage Bell helicopter in mobile army surgical hospital colours as used in the Korean war was giving rides. Steam launches gave rides on the small lake while others were on display.

==== Other events ====
Other events have included "Railroad Country", "The Great Train Race", "Matariki Night Lights", "Santa Day" and a "Military" weekend. The first two events have only happened once in the 1990s.

== Buildings and facilities ==
=== Glenbrook House ===
Relocated from Waiuku and restored in March 1995, Glenbrook House serves as the GVR's training and meeting facility. Located alongside the railway line, as was traditional of railway houses, the building is also used as a preparation and storage area prior to large events such as steam festivals and the Friends of Thomas events.

=== Pukeoware Workshop ===
The railway undertakes restoration projects at its workshop, located at Pukeoware, some four kilometres from Glenbrook. The site consists of a heavy engineering workshops in its main yard (with facilities for locomotive overhaul and mechanical engineering), a car and wagon shop in the north yard (specialising in carpentry and paint work) and three carriage storage sheds. The railway has been recognised on numerous occasions at the annual Federation of Rail Organisations NZ (formerly National Federation of Rail Societies) conference awards evening for various locomotive and carriage restorations.

Each track in a carriage shed holds between three and four standard 50 ft (15.24 m) carriages. As an example the third shed holds 12 standard 50 ft (15.24 m) carriages across three tracks, with a recently added lean-to addition adding another eight carriage lengths to the shed's capacity. A further extension to the rear of the shed is now being planned after approval of a grant by the ASB Community Trust. This ensures ongoing conservation of historic railway items.

Apart from maintaining and restoring items for use on the GVR and national excursions, the workshops have also been involved heavily in contracted restoration work of other organisations rolling stock such as Silver Stream Railways C 847 in 1994 and Mainline Steams K^{A} 942 in 1990. The workshop also assisted in the preparation of two carriages for the Carriage's Cafe restaurant in Kumeu, and filming of episodes of the Heroes television series on the Tangiwai disaster and Who Dares Wins.

=== Signal box ===
Glenbrook Station is the site for the restored former Auckland 'B' signalbox. The box used to stand in the former Auckland yards, near Gladstone Rd, on the location where the current North Island Main Trunk line now passes to go towards Britomart Transport Centre. The box has been fully restored and received a Rail Heritage Trust of New Zealand Restoration Award in recognition of the work. The box controls all signals at Glenbrook, the western end mainline points and the points to the fully restored ex Papakura turntable.

=== Station buildings ===
The railway has a number of historic station buildings in its care, all being from former New Zealand Railways stations.

- Glenbrook Station's terminal building is made up of the original Waiuku branch line Glenbrook station and Patumahoe station buildings.
- Glenbrook Station's picnic area shelter (and eventual platform 2 building) is the former Kingsland suburban station shelter, moved to Glenbrook in 2003 to make way for the double-tracking of Auckland's Western Line
- Morley Rd's station building is the original Pukeoware station building.

== Rolling stock ==
=== Steam locomotives ===
- J^{A} 1250 (ex NZR) 4-8-2 tender. Built 1949 by Hillside Workshops in Dunedin, J^{A} 1250 was purchased by Phil Goldman in 1972. Returned to service in 1982 and operated the first excursion on the mainline by steam power in 1985, after running regularly on the mainline network all over New Zealand 1250 was withdrawn in 1992 and a major overhaul started in 1995 with the locomotive being outshopped in 1998. At Phil Goldman's death in 2007, the locomotive was bequeathed to the GVR. 1250 was withdrawn in 2018 and is currently under overhaul.
- No. 1 – W^{W} 480 (ex NZR) 4-6-4T tank. Built 1910 by Hillside Workshops in Dunedin, purchased by the GVR in 1969, returned to service at the Papakura locomotive depot in 1976. 480 operated until 1997 and was overhauled until 2002, withdrawn for mechanical repairs and returned to service in March 2013. Pulled back out of service in May later that year due to the condition of the boiler. A new boiler was built for 480 and the locomotive attained her boiler ticket on 24 May 2018 and is now in service.
- No. 2 – W^{W} 644 (Ex NZR) 4-6-4T tank. Built 1915 by Hillside Workshops in Dunedin, returned to service in 2007. The locomotive was in service until 2018 when it was withdrawn for an overhaul with a new boiler. It was returned to service in 2022 after an extensive overhaul and is now certfied for main line excursions. 644 now frequently hauls trains throughout the upper North Island areas, most notably, travelling down the North Island Main Trunk Line to Palmerston north to attend the FRONZ 50 celebrations.
- No. 4 – Ex-Taupo Totara Timber Co. Mallet No. 7, 2-4-4-2 tender locomotive. Built in 1912 by the American Locomotive Company at Schenectady, New York, GVR No. 4 is known as the railway's flagship engine. It is NZ's only Mallet Compound Steam Engine. GVR No. 4 last worked in 2001 and has been stored since, occasionally it is brought out of storage for display at various events, such as its 100th birthday in 2012 when it was displayed in the private siding at Glenbrook and was given a cosmetic do over for the railway's 40th Anniversary in 2017, where it was propelled into Glenbrook station to recreate the official opening in 1977.
- F 233 (ex NZR) 0-6-0T tank. Built in 1885 by Robert Stephenson at Newcastle upon Tyne, F 233 was either purchased from or donated by AFFCo Southdown in 1964 and went on display at the former Onehunga Railway Station in Alfred St (the RES clubrooms) until 1984. It is stored at the Pukeoware workshops, carrying the name 'Adam'. The locomotive is unique in having a non-standard saddle tank, which was fitted by AFF Co.

==== Locomotives stored for other groups ====
- A 423 (ex NZR) 4-6-2 tender. Built 1909 by A & G Price at Thames, this locomotive is owned by Kevin and Paul Jowett and was formerly displayed at the Te Awamutu Railway Museum between 1971 and 2008. It is stored at Pukeoware.
- F^{A} 250 (Ex NZR) 0-6-2T tank. Built 1892 by Addington Workshops in Christchurch from 0-6-0ST F 250. Donated to the New Zealand Railway and Locomotive Society (Waikato Branch) by the Whakatane Board Mills in 1967, F^{A} 250 was leased out to the Goldfields Railway and later the Waitara Railway Preservation Society. The locomotive was under overhaul when it was returned to the NZR&LS, and arrived at the GVR in September 2010. It was partway through its overhaul, and remains disassembled.
- W^{AB} 800 (ex NZR) 4-6-4T tank. Built 1927 by A & G Price at Thames. W^{AB} 800 was purchased in 1967 by the NZR&LS (Waikato Branch) and displayed at Te Awamutu from 1967 to 2008. The locomotive arrived in May 2008.

==== Former resident locomotives ====
- A^{B} 832 (ex NZR) 4-6-2 tender. Built 1925 by North British Locomotive Company at Glasgow, Scotland. Leased from MOTAT, A^{B} 832 arrived in December 1996. It was the last steam locomotive to see scheduled service in the North Island in December 1967, and is in storage at Pukeoware. This locomotive was returned to MOTAT in August 2018.
- J 1211 (ex NZR) 4-8-2. Purchased by a syndicate from NZR 1971 and moved to Steam Incorporated. Purchased outright by Ian Welch in 1978, and moved to Glenbrook Vintage Railway for restoration prior to its lease to the Bay of Islands Vintage Railway in 1985–86. Restored to mainline standard and fitted with original style streamlining and returned to service in 1988. Converted to oil firing from October 1995 to December later that year. Named Gloria in preservation. Mainline Steam relocated J 1211 to their Plimmerton Depot in July 2025.
- J^{A} 1275 (ex NZR) 4-8-2. Was preserved by Les Hostick in 1967 and stored at the Te Awamutu Railway Museum at Te Awamutu, 1972. It sat on static display under a rudimentary shelter until 1994 when it was leased to Ian Welch and transferred to the Mainline Steam Heritage Trust's Parnell depot for restoration to main line running condition. Work began in 2001, and in 2004, JA 1275 returned to the main line railways. It has proven a reliable locomotive and sees frequent use on excursions.

The locomotive was railed to Mercer for storage in November 2025.

- J 1234 (ex NZR) 4-8-2 tender. Built 1939 by North British Locomotive Company at Glasgow, Scotland. This locomotive is owned by Steam Incorporated of Paekakariki, and was leased to the RES/GVR in 1998. Arriving in April 1998, it adopted the character of 'Wally' for the 1998 "Friends of Thomas" event in place of W^{W} 480. The locomotive was returned to Paekakariki in June 2015.

=== Diesel locomotives ===
The diesel roster used for Ways and Works, Shunting, and other purposes, comprises:

==== Resident locomotives ====
- No. 3 – An ex-New Zealand Ministry of Works 30 hp Ruston & Hornsby 0-4-0, GVR No. 3 was the railway's first locomotive. It is maintained in operational condition.
- No. 7 – formerly D^{S} 207 (TMS DS94). This locomotive is the sole survivor of the original four Ds locos imported by NZR in 1949 and is under overhaul.
- No. 8 – formerly D^{E} 507 (TMS DE1372). This locomotive is operational, and is used for occasional passenger service and regular work trains. The locomotive is operating as D^{E} 507, although it did carry its identity as GVR No. 8 in early 2010.
- No. 9 – formerly D^{E} 509. The locomotive is nonoperational and stored at Pukeoware. This locomotive did see some use in the 1980s on work trains, but was placed into storage and has not operated since.
- No. 10 – formerly D^{SA} 243 (TMS DSA455). This locomotive is one of three surviving Bagnall-built D^{SA} class locomotives. The DSA arrived in 1988 as a replacement for No. 5, which had been damaged while being returned from another railway. It received an overhaul in 2008 and was repainted from GVR yellow into NZR red, but retaining its present identity as GVR No. 10.
- No. 11 – DBR1254. Built as D^{B} 1005 by General Motors in Canada, and rebuilt into DBR1254 in 1982. The locomotive was purchased in August 2017 and arrived at the GVR on 3 November 2017. Mainline certified.
- No. 12 – DBR1295. Built as D^{B} 1013 by General Motors in Canada, and rebuilt into DBR1295 in 1982. The locomotive was purchased in August 2017 and arrived at the GVR on 3 November 2017. It has been repainted in the original "fruit salad" colour scheme and is in service on the GVR.
- No. 14 – DC4818. Built as D^{A} 1481 by General Motors in Canada, and rebuilt into DC4818 in 1983. The locomotive was purchased in December 2018. It arrived at the GVR on 25 April 2019. The locomotive received an extensive overhaul and is now operational and certified to run on the national network.
- No. 15 – DC4536. Built as D^{A} 1505 by General Motors in Canada, and rebuilt into DC4536 in 1983. The locomotive's purchase was announced in September 2021, being funded by a long-time supporter. For eventual overhaul with the intention of becoming mainline certified.

==== Former resident locomotives ====
- D^{A} 1410 (TMS DA126). This locomotive was leased from Steam Incorporated by the RES, and arrived on site in September 1998. The locomotive was returned to Steam Incorporated's Paekakariki site in June 2015.
- D^{A} 1431 (TMS DA345). This locomotive was leased from Steam Incorporated with D^{A} 1410 in 1998 and later ended up in storage. It returned to Paekakariki in 2008 and has since been restored to operational condition with the necessary equipment to allow it to work on the main line.
- No. 5 – formerly D^{SA} 230. Drewry D^{SA} 230 was often loaned out to other groups by the GVR, but this practice ended in 1988 when the locomotive was towed while in gear. The result was the transmission was damaged beyond repair, and so Bagnall DSA455 was obtained as a replacement. The remains of D^{SA} 230 were then stripped of all useful parts and the remains lingered at Pukeoware until they were scrapped in 1990.

=== Self-propelled equipment ===
- Railcar RM 32 "Pangatoru" –.Stored, previously owned by the New Zealand Railway and Locomotive Society Waikato Branch, arrived on site December 2001.
- Plasser & Theurer Ballast tamper 864 – Under Light Repairs, heavily used in civil engineering works (recent large projects include tamping 900 metres of relaid track between Glenbrook and Morley Road, Waiuku Extension works beyond Fernleigh and a 1998 project to tamp most of the lightweight rail track on the Dargaville Branch in Northland.
- Cowans Sheldon crane 224 – operational. Heavily used in mechanical engineering and civil engineering works including lifting locomotive boilers, carriage bodies, track sets and other equipment. Can be included in a train, or travel (albeit slowly) under its own power.

=== Passenger carriages ===
==== Domestic carriages ====
The domestic passenger fleet comprises late 19th and early 20th century rolling stock. Most vehicles are the traditional narrow-bodied A series wooden carriages, turned out in a red livery, featuring opening windows and outdoor viewing balconies on each end. These carriages either have side-facing longitudinal seating or arrangements of paired seating on one side of the aisle and singular seating on the other. These carriages are named after the Māori migration canoes that brought the Māori people to New Zealand from Hawaiki.

The core fleet of carriages includes or has included:

- A^{F} 804 "Tainui", 47 1/2 ft (14.48 m) carriage incorporating guards' compartment and luggage area.
- A 1161 "Mataatua", 50 ft (15.24 m) standard passenger carriage
- A 1162 "Aotea", 50 ft (15.24 m) standard passenger carriage
- A 1222 "Te Arawa", 50 ft (15.24 m) standard passenger carriage fitted with longitudinal seating
- F 141 "Nga Tira", former 50 ft (15.24 m) guards' van, with the luggage and storage area converted into a covered outdoor viewing carriage. Fondly known as the "Chicken Coop"
- V^{B} 624 "Waka Whenua", former steam crane support wagon, converted into an uncovered outdoor viewing carriage.
- U^{B} 1554 "Nga Hau", an outdoor viewing carriage was retired from service in 1998 and scrapped in 2002 following condemning. Waka Whenua was built in 1993 as a replacement.

Notable unique carriages which are operated on special occasions include...

- C 472, a very historic Clemenson-Patent six-wheeled carriage, built by the Oldbury Car Company, England in 1879. Originally used on Auckland's first railway, the Onehunga Branch (which utilised this style carriage), it was relocated by ship to the Donnellys Crossing Section. After being withdrawn in 1933, the carriage body was donated to the Donnellys Crossing Axemans Association. In 1989, the Railway Enthusiasts Society purchased the carriage and moved it to Pukeoware for a full restoration, which was completed in 1996. The carriage runs at special event days, such as on Glenbrook yard rides at the Day Out with Thomas event.
- A 543 "Manakura", 44 1/2 ft (13.56 m) clerestory roof kitchen/diner carriage with seating for 25, coal fired range and stunning stained glass windows (in the clerestory). Withdrawn from service in 2002 for an overhaul, the carriage is stored.
- A 1452, 44 1/2 ft (13.56 m) "wide-body" carriage restored as a parlour carriage featuring a bar, plush leather lounge and extended outdoor viewing area specifically for charter work. Intended to be a partner carriage to Af 1182, this carriage has been turned out in the same green livery to match the dining carriage.
- A^{F} 1182, 60 ft (18.29 m) carriage with a guards compartment and luggage area. Built with 72 seats for Auckland commuter trains, the carriage is currently being converted for use as a dining car. This includes food preparation and servery area. The car will also be fitted with a toilet. The carriage has been turned out in a green livery and operated in public service for the first time at the "Friends of Thomas Weekend" of 8 and 9 November 2008. In 2016 the carriage entered the carriage workshop for the conversion work.

==== National network fleet ====
The railway owns a fleet of carriages, known as the "mainline fleet", formerly owned by the parent body (Railway Enthusiasts Society) and leased to the railway. The fleet has undergone an overhaul and re-certification with KiwiRail. Excursions have seen them tour all around New Zealand, including to Gisborne, New Plymouth, Whakatāne, Bay of Islands, Wellington, Christchurch, Arthurs Pass and Timaru.

Turned out in the original Glenbrook Vintage Railway livery of yellow bodies, white ceilings and chocolate lining, the fleet consists of the following vehicles...

Four carriages built in the early 20th century for the (then) newly opened North Island Main Trunk express services, before being relocated onto Auckland commuter train services post war through to retirement in the early 1970s:

- A^{A} 1134, 50 ft (15.24 m) wide-body wooden carriage built in Petone workshops, Wellington, in 1909.
- A^{A} 1233, 50 ft (15.24 m) wide-body wooden carriage built in Petone workshops, Wellington, in 1912.
- A^{A} 1258, 50 ft (15.24 m) wide-body wooden carriage built in Newmarket workshops, Auckland, in 1912.
- A^{A} 1494, 50 ft (15.24 m) wide-body wooden carriage built in Newmarket workshops, Auckland, in 1924. Currently on loan to Steam Incorporated.

These carriages are fully certified for operations on the KiwiRail network, and the original "drop toilets" have been upgraded with chemical retention holding tanks.

Three carriages built during World War II to replace the original North Island Main Trunk express service carriages, and later allocated to Auckland commuter trains from the 1970s to retirement in 1994.

- A 1948 (TMS A56496), NZR 56-foot carriage. Built in 1939 at Addington Workshops, Christchurch. Overhauled at United Group's Hutt Workshops and returned to Pukeoware in May 2008. Carriage restoration completed in October 2009. First operation on the KiwiRail network in private ownership on 17 April 2011.
- A 1926 (TMS AL56112), 56 ft (17.07 m) steel-panelled carriage built in 1939 at Otahuhu Workshops, Auckland with vestibule guards area. Overhauled at United Group's Hutt Workshops, Wellington, and returned to Pukeoware in March 2009. Carriage restoration completed in March 2011. First operation on the KiwiRail network in private ownership on 17 April 2011.
- AL 1991 (TMS AL56037), 56 ft (17.07 m) steel-panelled carriage with separate guard/luggage compartment, built in 1940 at Addington Workshops, Christchurch. Previously certified

Five 'small window' former KiwiRail charter fleet carriages.

- A56263 (NZR A 1918), NZR 56-foot carriage. Built in 1939 at Otahuhu Workshops, Auckland. Arrived at GVR in October 2013. Currently under overhaul for mainline use.
- A56121 (NZR A 1897), NZR 56-foot carriage. Built in 1941 at Otahuhu Workshops, Auckland. Arrived at GVR in June 2013. Currently under overhaul for mainline use.
- A56030 (NZR A 1860), NZR 56-foot carriage. Built in 1938 at Otahuhu Workshops, Auckland. Arrived at GVR in June 2013. Currently stored pending overhaul.
- A56180 (NZR A 1908), NZR 56-foot carriage. Built in 1939 at Otahuhu Workshops, Auckland. Arrived at GVR in June 2013. Currently stored pending overhaul.
- A56742 (NZR A 1985), NZR 56-foot carriage. Built in 1943 at Addington Workshops, Christchurch. Arrived at GVR in October 2013. Currently stored pending overhaul.

Three 'big window' former KiwiRail charter fleet (previously Overlander and Tranz Alpine) carriages.

- ASO1, NZR 56-foot carriage with servery and large rear window. Built in 1941 at Addington Workshops, Christchurch. Arrived at GVR on 8 September 2018. Currently stored pending overhaul.
- ASO110, NZR 56-foot carriage with servery. Built in 1939 at Otahuhu Workshops, Auckland. Arrived at GVR on 8 September 2018. Currently stored pending overhaul.
- AO198, NZR 56-foot carriage. Built in 1939 at Addington Workshops, Christchurch. Arrived at GVR on 8 September 2018. Currently stored pending overhaul.

Guard's van FM1133 was built as a three-module van for freight service in 1981. Withdrawn when guards were no longer required on freight trains, the RES converted one module into a storage area, the middle module into a crew area and the third module into a fully functioning kitchen for catering on excursion trains. The van is currently out of service pending major repairs including fitting of refurbished bogies.

Generator and luggage van AG49 is currently on lease from KiwiRail and is intended to be used to power GVR's AO carriage fleet.

Wooden guard's van F 394 (TMS F285) was built in 1913 and used on the 2008 Parliamentary Special and Governor's Special, in green livery.

Mainline guard's van F 601 (TMS F1397) was built in 1944 at Otahuhu Workshops, Auckland. Was stored at the Goldfields Railway and was relocated to Glenbrook in 2021.

==== Former Auckland Transport AT MAXX SA and SD class ====
The Railway Enthusiasts Society purchased 9x SA and 4x SD carriages in 2021 for their future charter and tourism needs, which were tested and certified in order to be hauled north from Taumarunui to storage in Mission Bush near Glenbrook in August 2024. They were used in sets of four, five, or six with DC, DCP, DFT, or DFB locomotives until 2014/15 as they were phased out as the Auckland Suburban network was electrified:

- SA class: SA5638, SA5770, SA5703, SA5818, SA5743, SA5829, SA5617, SA5695, SA5730
- SD class: SD3199, SD5652, SD5762, SD5842

Along with these passenger carriages, it is expected that water support wagon U^{C} 686, steam locomotives J^{A} 1250, W^{W} 480, and W^{W} 644 will also be certified for KiwiRail network operations in the future.

=== Freight wagons and way and works vehicles ===
A large selection of freight wagons has been purchased, donated or leased. The railway has found use for many of the railway wagons that it has acquired and displays them on demonstration runs and for photographers' specials. The set includes a full rake of ballast wagons and plough van, which have been used during large-scale works such as the Waiuku Extension and major track renewal. Other items include replica workman's hut, refrigerated wagons, cement wagons and bulk oil tanks.

== In media ==
The Glenbrook Vintage Railway appears as a stage in the video game The King of Fighters 2003.

== See also ==
- List of New Zealand railway museums and heritage lines
