= Narrow gauge railways of New Zealand =

There are a small number of railways in New Zealand, primarily used to carry passengers for amusement purposes. They are of three different gauges: 10^{1}/_{2}, 15 and 24 inch.

Note that the national railway network uses 1,067 mm (3 ft 6 in) Cape gauge; see Rail transport in New Zealand.

North Island
| Name | Location | Gauge |
|---|---|---|
| Kaikohe Museum | Kaikohe | 24" |
| Waitakere Tramline Society | Waitākere Ranges | 24″ |
| Watercare Services | Waitākere Ranges | 24″ |
| Whangoparoa Narrow Gauge Railway | Whangoparoa | 15" |
| Driving Creek Railway and Potteries | Coromandel | 15" |
| Victoria Battery Tramway | Waikino | 24″ |
| Totara Springs Camp | Matamata | 24" |
| Esplanade Scenic Railway | Palmerston North | 10^{1}/_{2} |
| Masterton Miniature Train Society | Masterton | 10^{1}/_{2} |

South Island
| Name | Location | Gauge |
|---|---|---|
| Marlborough Sounds Railway | Onahau Bay | 24" |
| Blenheim Riverside Railway | Blenheim | 24" |
| Appleby Railway Company | Appleby | 24" |
| Nile River Tramway | Charleston | 24" |
| Ferrymead Two-foot Railway | Ferrymead (Christchurch) | 24" |
