= Ferrymead (disambiguation) =

Ferrymead is a suburb of Christchurch, New Zealand.

Ferrymead may also refer to:

- Ferrymead Railway, a heritage railway
- Ferrymead Bays, a soccer club in Christchurch, New Zealand

== See also ==
- Ferrymead Two Foot Railway
- Ferrymead Heritage Park, a museum in Christchurch, New Zealand
