= Dargaville Branch =

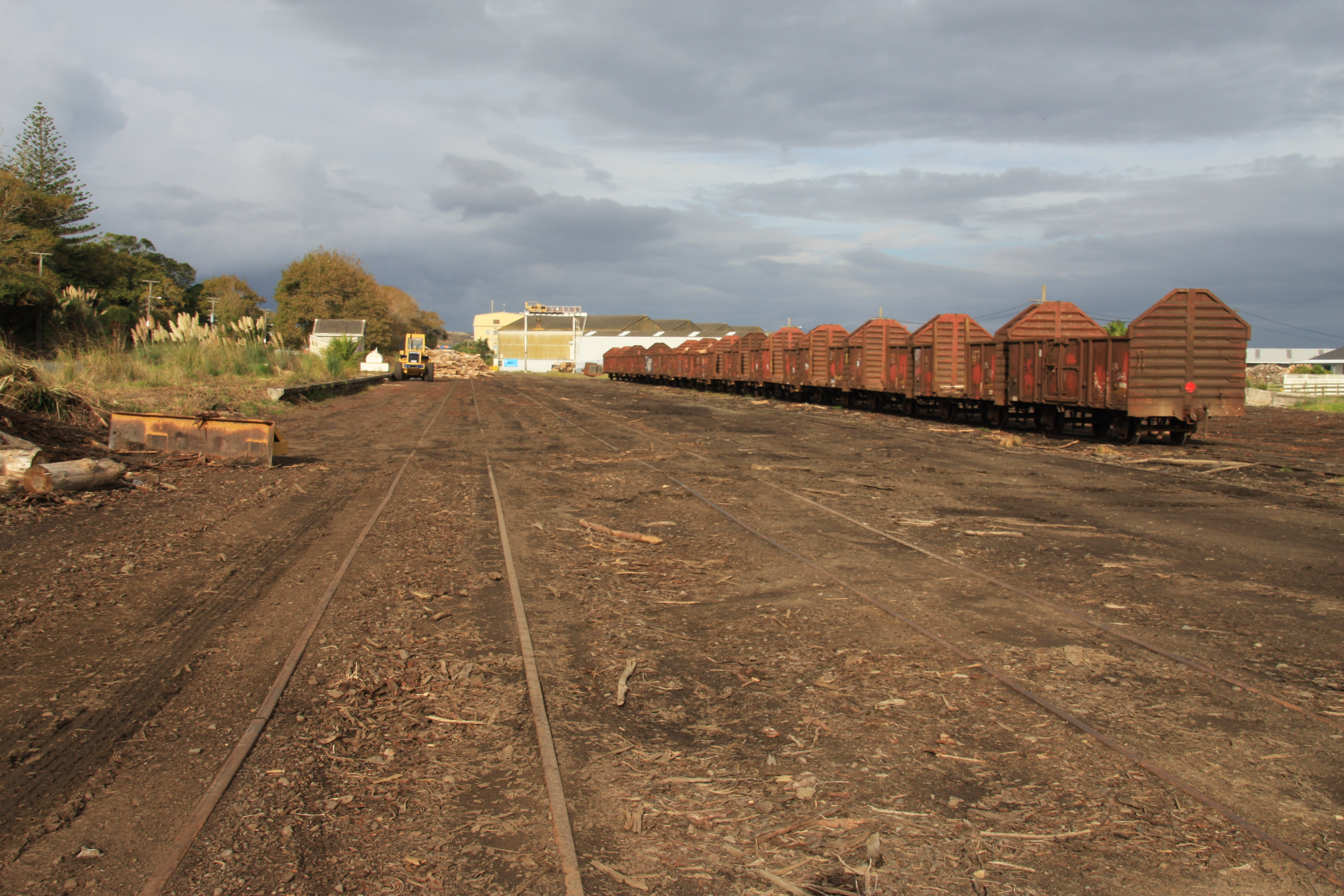
- Goods wagons for logs in Dargaville railway yard, 2010.

Overview
- Status: Mothballed (closed until further notice)
- Owner: KiwiRail
- Locale: Dargaville
- Termini: Waiotira Junction; Dargaville

History
- Opened: 15 March 1943
- Mothballed: 14 October 2014

Technical
- Line length: 49.60 km (30.82 mi)
- Num of tracks: Single
- Character: Rural
- Track gauge: 1,067 mm (3 ft 6 in)

Map

The Dargaville Branch is a branch line railway that leaves the North Auckland Line not far south of Whangārei and runs westward to Dargaville. Construction of this relatively short line took approximately two decades, and when it was completed, it linked the now closed Donnellys Crossing Section with the national rail network. The branch has been closed to all traffic since 2014 and is currently used by a tourist rail cart operation.

== Construction ==
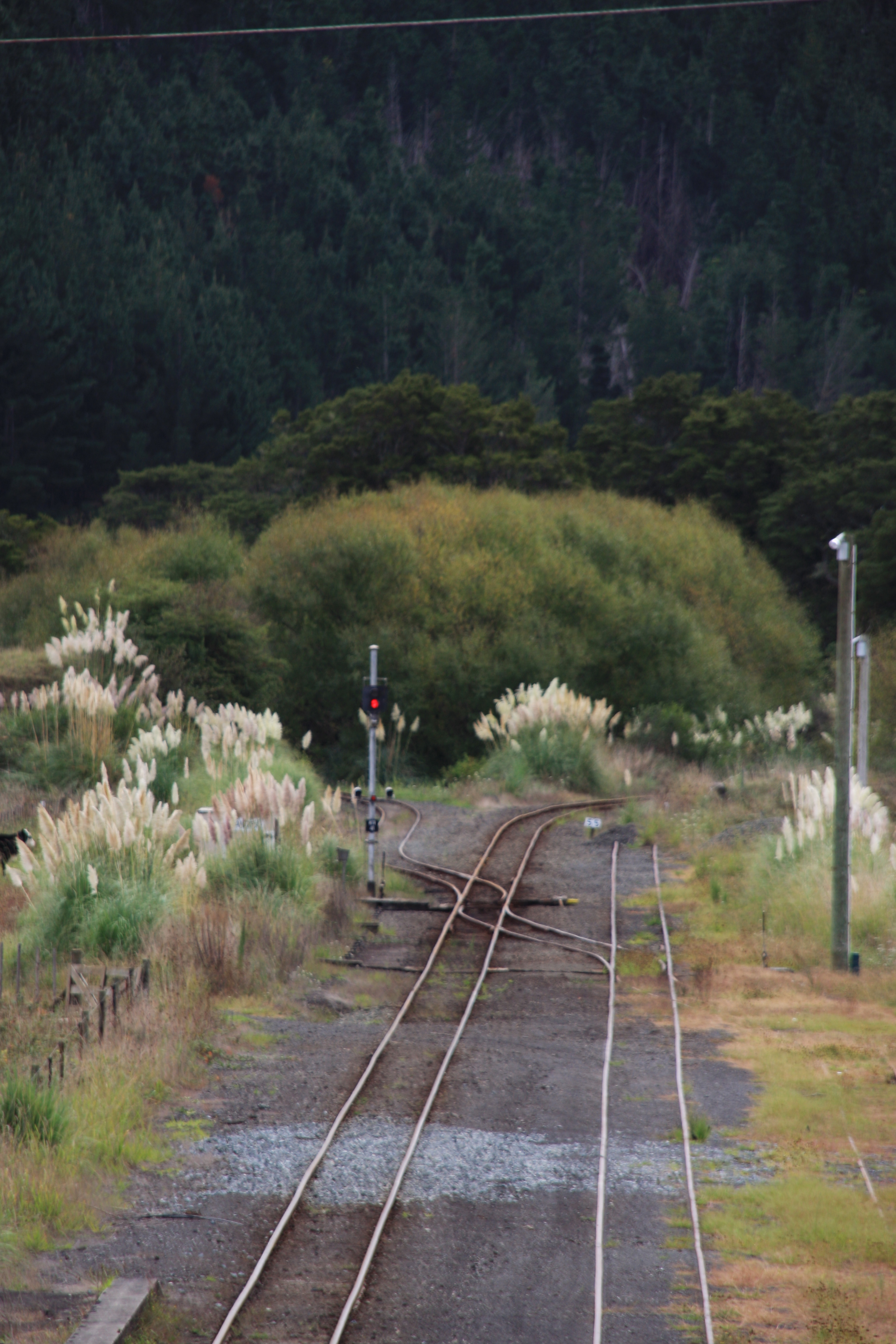
Junction of the Dargaville Branch and North Auckland Line in Waiotira, 2010. The line to Dargaville branches off to the left, while the main line curves to the right towards Whangārei.

The Dargaville Branch was built relatively late in comparison to most railway lines in New Zealand. Construction from Waiotira on the North Auckland Line commenced in 1922, but Dargaville was not reached for another eighteen years. The first twenty-two kilometres through unstable country took six years to build, with the line opened to Kirikopuni on 15 May 1928. In January 1931, the line was open to Tangowahine, sixteen kilometres from Dargaville, but construction then ceased for five years due to the Great Depression. In 1940, trains commenced running to Dargaville, but the old railway station (used by the Donnellys Crossing Section) was closed and a new station built at a different location, delaying the formal opening of the Dargaville Branch until 15 March 1943, over twenty years after construction began.

Initially, a railway from Kirikopuni north to Kaikohe was proposed, but by 1928 when there was a line from Whangarei this proposal was discarded. However the line was initially constructed with a balloon loop into the town of Kirikopuni, two kilometres north of the direct line to Dargaville, as a result of pressure from the local MP and Prime Minister Gordon Coates. A bypass eliminated the loop in 1943.

== Operation ==
From its opening until March 1967, mixed trains carrying both passengers and freight ran to connect with passenger services on the North Auckland Line - the Northland Express (Auckland-Opua and return) until November 1956, and then the 88 seater railcars (Auckland-Okaihau and return). After March 1967, the line carried freight only.

In December 1998, a major derailment damaged a major section of the track and closed the line. For the first six months of 1999 the line remained closed while Tranz Rail reviewed the line, as one of the biggest customers (Northland Dairy Company's dairy factory in Dargaville) was also due to close on 30 June 2000. Tranz Rail reopened the line in June 1999 with logs being the primary business.

A daily return train was scheduled from Monday to Friday but it only ran when required. It takes roughly three hours both ways; the service to Dargaville arrived in the mid-morning and departed before lunch, arriving in Whangārei in the mid-afternoon.

== October 2014 closure ==
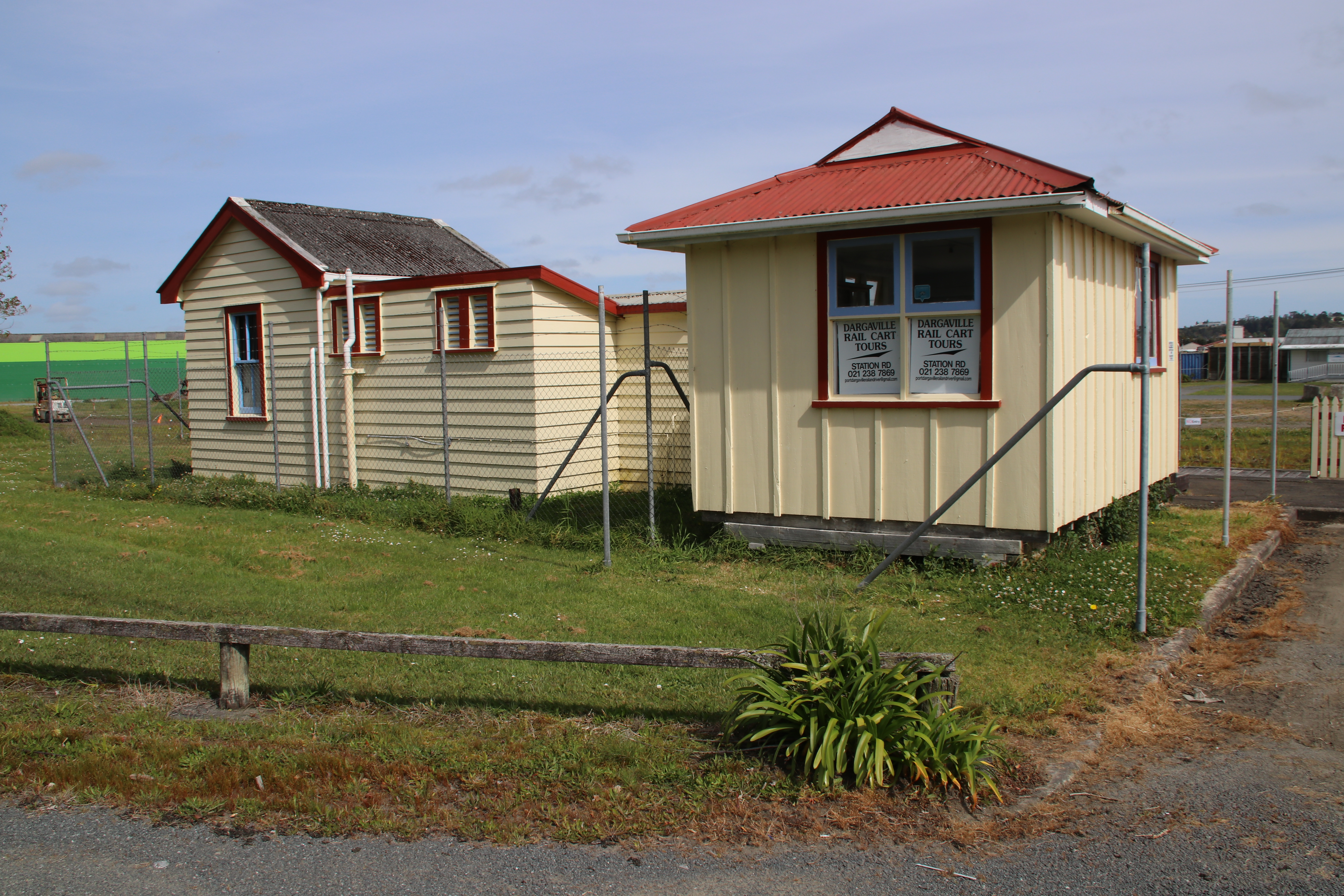
Dargaville railway station in 2018. The structure at left is the remaining structures from 1943 (the main station building having been demolished); the newer office at right was added for the rail cart service.

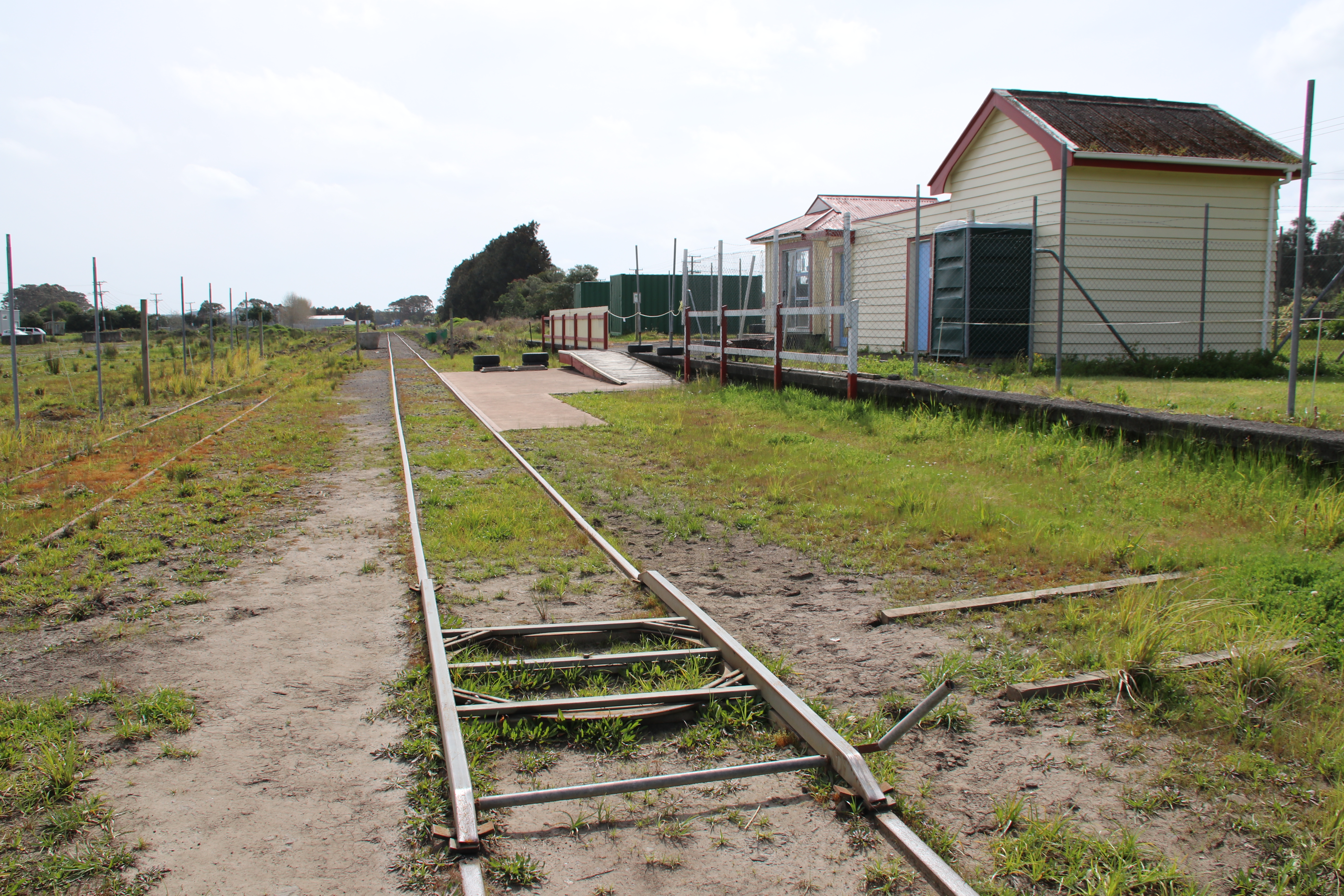
Dargaville yard in use for tourist rail carts in 2018; in the foreground is a small turntable to turn the rail carts.

On 14 October 2014 KiwiRail staff were told the line was closed until further notice. The loading contractor responsible for the loading of rail wagons, Forest Loaders, were also informed and all remaining wood stock will be removed by road. Earlier the line was shut for a number of months due to a washout, the line was repaired but the only activity after the repair was the removal of all stranded rail wagons.

In 2015, a tourist rail cart service began using the branch line.

== Motive power ==
Typical motive power on the Dargaville Branch from its opening until the mid-1960s were steam locomotives of the A^{B} and J classes. When the line was dieselised, D^{A} class diesel-electrics took over and worked the line until 1988. In 2000 the sole remaining DJ class locomotive was allocated to Whangārei to work the line. The DBR class and DC class locomotives comprised the typical motive power from then until the closure of the line in October 2014.

== See also ==
- North Auckland Line
- Donnellys Crossing Section/Branch
- Marsden Point Branch
- Ōkaihau Branch
- Onerahi Branch
- Opua Branch
