= Donnellys Crossing section =

Railway line in Northland, New Zealand

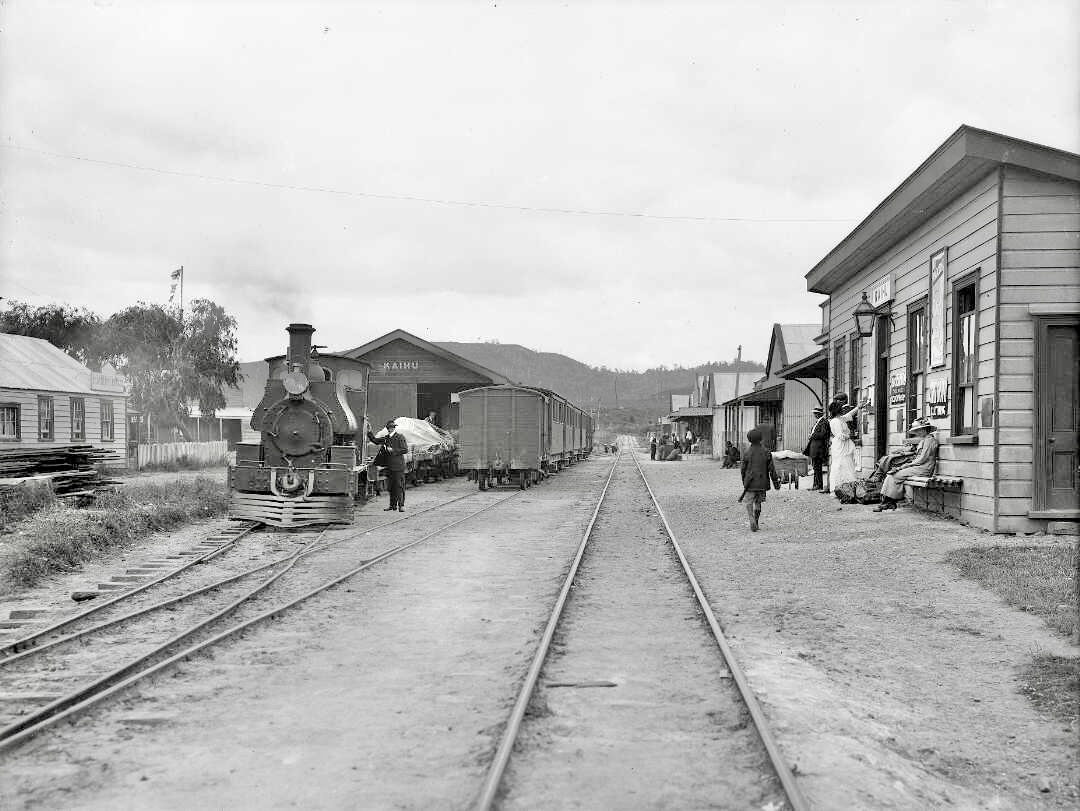
- Kaihu railway station about 1910

Overview
- Other names: Kaihu Valley railway Kaihu branch Donnellys Crossing branch
- Owner: Railways Department
- Locale: Northland, New Zealand
- Termini: Dargaville; Donnellys Crossing
- Stations: 14

Service
- Type: Heavy rail
- System: New Zealand Government Railways (NZGR)
- Services: 1
- Operator(s): Railways Department

History
- Opened: February 1889
- Completed to Donnellys Crossing: 1 April 1923
- Connected to National Network: 15 March 1942
- Closed: 19 July 1959

Technical
- Line length: 35.91 km (22.31 mi)
- Number of tracks: Single
- Character: Rural
- Track gauge: 3 ft 6 in (1,067 mm)

Map

The Donnellys Crossing section (later the Donnellys Crossing branch), also known as the Kaihu Valley railway or Kaihu branch, was a railway line in Northland, New Zealand. Initially an isolated line of 35.91 kilometres (22.31 mi), it became a branch line when the Dargaville Branch was opened and connected it with the North Auckland Line and the rest of the national rail network in 1943. The branch was closed in July 1959.

The name of the line is often given as the Donnelly's Crossing Section or Branch. Although grammatically accurate, this is incorrect as the locality's name is officially recognised as Donnellys Crossing with no apostrophe.

== Construction ==
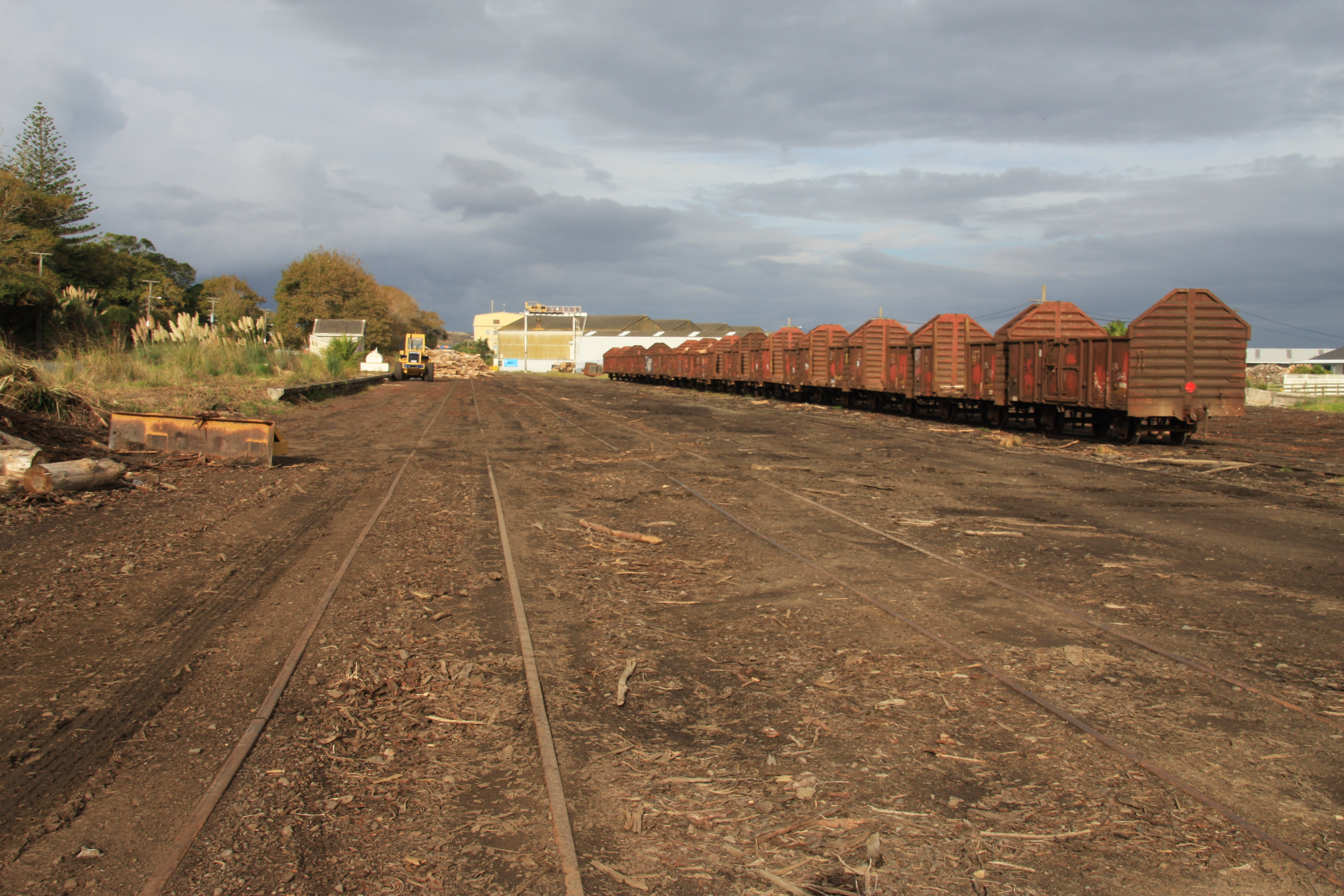
From 1943 to 1959, the Donnellys Crossing Branch terminated at the new Dargaville station on the west side of town, pictured here in 2010.

The Kaihu Valley Railway Company Limited (KVRC) formed in 1882 under the provisions of the Railways Construction and Land Act of 1881 to build a railway linking lumber mills in the Kaihu Valley with the port in Dargaville. The Railways Construction and Land Act authorised settlers to build railways instead of waiting for the government to do it, and the KVRC hoped that diverse traffic would develop and use the line. However, it was not until February 1889 that the line reached Opanake, and with the Long Depression taking its toll, the KVRC went bankrupt and the government foreclosed, taking over the line in 1890.

With the economy improving, a short extension was opened to Kaihu on 21 October 1896, but it was not until 1908 that further work was undertaken. Construction was extremely slow and the few kilometres to Whatoro were not open until 1 June 1914. World War I brought construction to an absolute halt, and when work began after the war, the final extension of the line was built and opened to Donnellys Crossing on 1 April 1923.

In 1940, this isolated section of track was finally linked to the national network when the Dargaville Branch off the North Auckland Line reached Dargaville. However, the relocation and reconstruction of Dargaville's railway station was seen as required and this work took until 1943, when the Dargaville branch was officially opened as a connection to the North Auckland Line.

== Stations ==
The following stations were located on the Donnellys Crossing Section (in brackets is the distance in kilometres from Dargaville):

- Parore (2 km)
- Babylon (5 km)
- Rotu (8 km)
- Maitahi (11 km)
- Taita (12 km)
- Mamaranui (14 km)
- Dairy Flat (15 km)
- Maropiu (17 km)
- Ahikiwi (19 km)
- Opanake (22 km)
- Kaihu (23.52 km (14.61 mi) From 23 September 1896 there was a Money Order office at Kaihu station and on 1 January 1897 a Post Office operated by NZR staff opened. From 31 March 1923 it was no longer operated by NZR staff and on 17 March 1963 it was moved from the station. By March 1898 Kaihu had a 45 ft (14 m) x 15 ft (4.6 m), 5th class, lean-to station, with a platform and cart approach, a 36 ft (11 m) x 24 ft (7.3 m) goods shed, water supply, urinals and a passing loop for 25 wagons. A verandah was added in 1900, a loading bank soon after and stockyards in 1917. From 1 April 1923, the stationmaster at Kaihu was withdrawn and the station became a flag station. In 1896 the Public Works Department put in an extension for the Mitchelson Brothers, but in November 1900 Kaihu Booms, 48 ch (970 m) north of Kaihu, became the terminus of the Kaihu section, in place of Mitchelson's Siding, which was 31 ch (620 m) further north. Kaihu Booms siding closed in 1917 and was lifted in 1918. Trounson's also had a timber mill just north of Kaihu in 1897, with a "gigantic" tramway system, including the Siberia tram, opened on 28 September 1904. By April 1960 it was reported that the station and yard were overgrown with weeds and by January 1962 the kauri-built goods shed had been turned into a film theatrette.
- Whatoro (27 km)
- Aranga (32 km)
- Donnellys Crossing (36 km)

== Operation ==
Initially, the Donnellys Crossing Section resembled a bush tramway built to railway standards, though after the government's Railways Department acquired the line from the KVRC, it became more of a general purpose railway. Logging traffic was so heavy in the early part of the 20th century that the line was briefly considered to be one of the most profitable in New Zealand. Two "mixed" trains of both passengers and freight ran each way each day, typically carrying significant quantities of timber from the kauri forest in the area. Only so much forest existed, though, and in the 1920s, both the logging industry and the railway began their decline. In 1934, only a quarter of traffic came from the logging industry, and any hopes that a connection to the national network would improve the line's fortunes were soon dashed. Trains were cut to run just once a day in each direction in 1942, and then thrice weekly in 1951. By this point, only 171 tons of timber originated on the line and larger quantities were being railed into the area.

Remarkably, passenger services survived right until the end. Many New Zealand branch lines lost their passenger services during the 1930s, with private cars seen as far preferable over the slow pace of country mixed trains that stopped to shunt at many sidings along the way, but in the isolated Far North, people were still happy to use the train. Initially, four six-wheeled passenger wagons were based in the area, but in 1933, two-bogied carriages were introduced. As late as 1958–59, approximately 15 people were carried per train, but the overall quantity of traffic was extremely poor and there was no reason to keep the line open any longer. Closure came on 19 July 1959, though the Dargaville shunter ran wagons of freight to and from Kaihu for a few more months.

The Donnellys Crossing Section was exclusively the domain of tank locomotives. During the line's period of isolation, F class engines were the dominant motive power, and with the opening of the Dargaville Branch the line was upgraded to permit the use of W^{W} class locomotives. The line closed too early for diesel motive power to be introduced. Until the Dargaville Branch opened, locomotives requiring major overhaul were sent to Newmarket, by ship or barge.

== Today ==
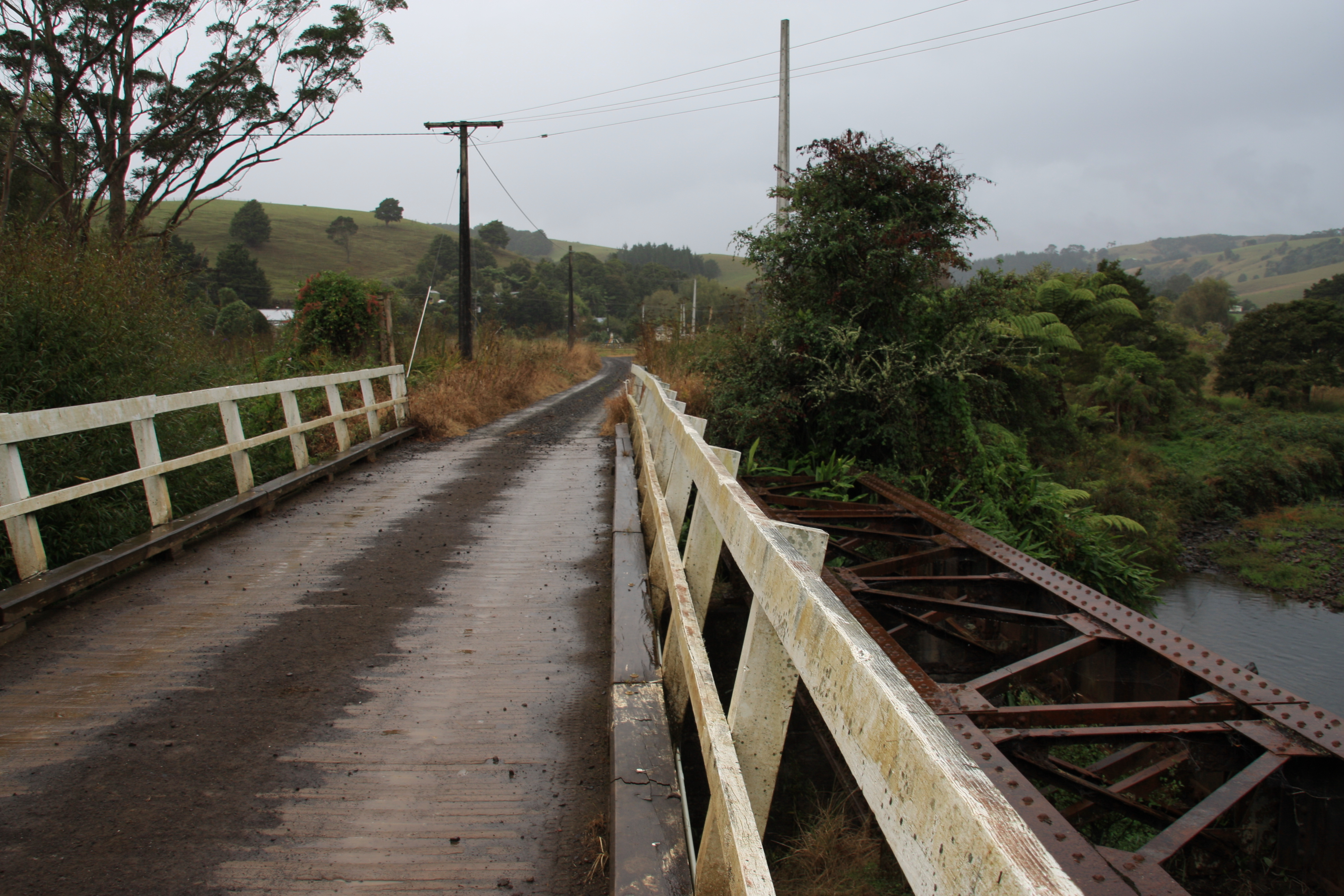
Former double track yard bridge at Donnellys Crossing in 2010: at right is the framework of the former main line bridge, while at left, the decked-over loop bridge has been adapted for reuse by Donnellys Station Road.

Relics of closed railway lines naturally diminish and disappear over time due to the effects of both nature and human development, but in the rural setting of the Far North of New Zealand, some signs of the Donnellys Crossing Section have survived. For much of the line's length, its formation can be seen travelling through the countryside, along with the remains of some bridges. Unfortunately, Kaihu's station building was removed at some point in the latter half of the 1990s, followed by Donnellys Crossing's station building sometime in the first decade of the 2000s. Donnellys Crossing station yard incorporated a double track bridge, one side of which was decked for railway staff; this side of the bridge has been adapted to road use, with the underframe still in place on the unused half.

Little remains of the locomotives and rolling stock of the KVRC. The last member of the F class, F 216 (built by Neilson and Company in 1888), was built for the KVRC and was subsequently bought by the Railways Department. It was in use until April 1932, when it was sold to the Auckland Farmers Freezing Co., Horotiu, who converted the engine to diesel propulsion. It was donated to the Goldfields Railway in 1981 and then to the Bush Tramway Club in 1985. It is located at their Pukemiro depot.

=== Kaihu Valley Trail ===
A cycle trail is being planned to use much of the line, $4m of the cost being from the Provincial Growth Fund.

== See also ==
- North Auckland Line
- Dargaville Branch
- Marsden Point Branch
- Ōkaihau Branch
- Onerahi Branch
- Opua Branch
