= Ferrymead Two Foot Railway =

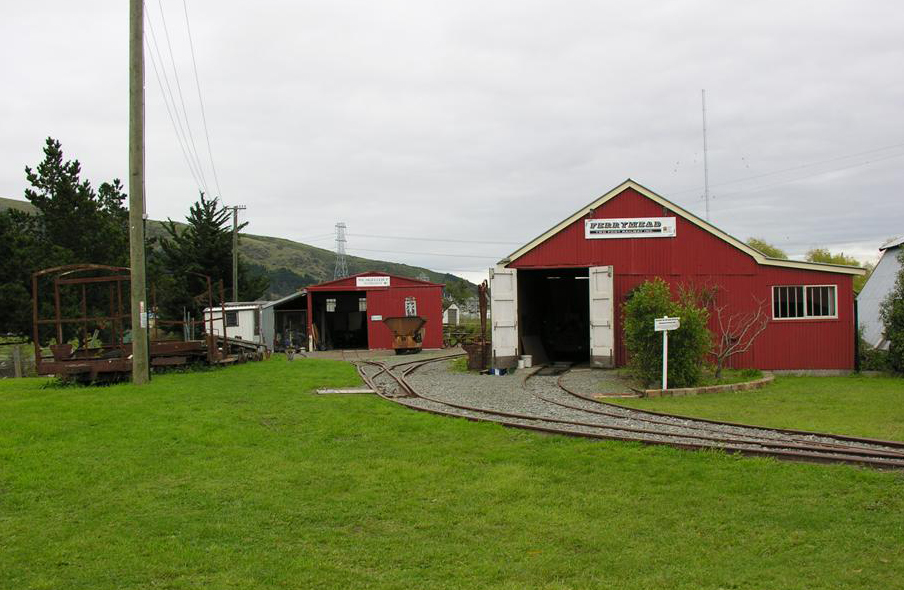
The Two Foot Railway workshops, 2009

The Ferrymead Two Foot Railway Society Inc. was a society based in Ferrymead Heritage Park, Heathcote, Christchurch, New Zealand. The society operated a 450 m (1,480 ft) of 2 ft (610 mm) narrow gauge railway until a dwindling volunteer force finally resulted in closure and dissolving of the Society in March 2021. Most of the rolling stock the society operated was from the Lake Grassmere Saltworks former salt collection railway. Blenheim Riverside Railway obtained much of the rolling stock collection.

== Locomotives ==
The railway had two F.C. Hibberd & Co. "Planet" diesel-mechanical locomotives, built in 1953. Both were originally imported by Dominion Salt Limited for use at its Lake Grassmere salt works in Marlborough; following the construction of a conveyor belt system to replace the railway in 1964 both locomotives were placed in open-air storage at Lake Grassmere before moving to Ferrymead in 1967.

Both locomotives were named after members of the Skellerup family who originally owned the salt works, Winifred being named after the late Winifred Skellerup while George is named after George Skellerup, Winifred's father and the original owner of Dominion Salt.

== Rolling stock ==
The Society owned a small fleet of wagons, mostly obtained from coal mines on the West Coast of the South Island. The majority of these were coal tubs, although there are a small number of wagons built for maintenance purposes underground. The society also owned a small number of side-tipping wagons formerly used by Dominion Salt at Lake Grassmere.
