= Blenheim Riverside Railway =

Heritage railway in New Zealand

Blenheim Riverside Railway Society
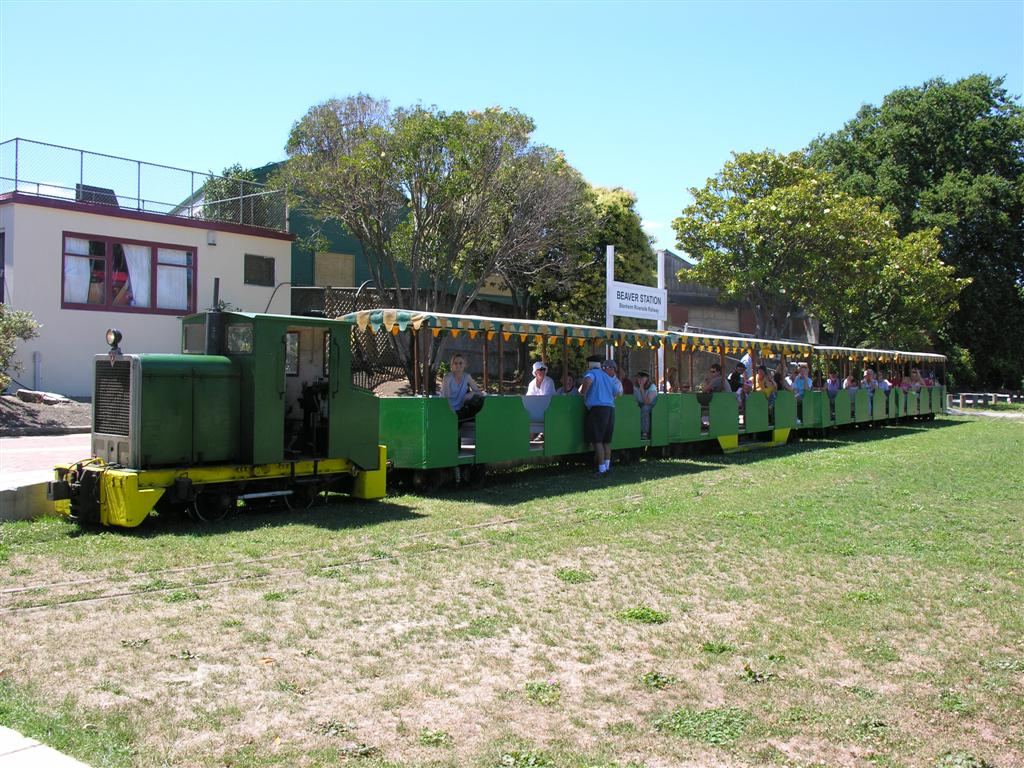
- Train at Beaver Station with the George locomotive
- Locale: Blenheim, Marlborough, New Zealand
- Terminus: Brayshaw Park
- Coordinates: 41.531551°S 173.939602°E

Preservation history
- 1985: Formation of Society
- 1990: Railway Officially Opens
- 1997: Brayshaw Park Station completed
- 2005: Extension to Beaver Station completed
- 2015: Extension to Omaka Corlett Station completed

Website
- www.riversiderailway.nz

The Blenheim Riverside Railway (BRRS or BRR) is a 2 ft (610 mm) narrow gauge heritage railway in Blenheim, New Zealand. It runs along the Taylor River, which winds its way through the middle of the town. It is operated by the all-volunteer Blenheim Riverside Railway Society.

== History ==
The railway society was founded in 1985 by members of the Marlborough Historical Society, and shortly after rail was sourced and a workshop constructed. The line was progressively laid from 1987 and the railway officially opened in 1990, between Brayshaw and Fulton. Four carriages were built in 1989-1990, and the A & G Price locomotive (later named "George") was restored and put into service. The first station at Brayshaw Park was very basic; however during 1995 the present station - a scale replica of a Troup-designed station - was constructed, with an extension of track from the workshop requiring a cutting and embankment with a steep gradient. In 2005, the track was extended from Fulton to the current terminus at Beaver Station in central Blenheim. Over the years the workshops have been enlarged, and concrete sleepers made by the volunteer members have been used to replace the wooden ones first used on the line. And March 2015 was the opening of a branch line extension to Omaka Airfield.

== Operations ==
Trains run normally on the first and third Sundays of every month for the general public. Trains also run extra days during school holidays and over late December or early January. These use both the main line and branch line, with trains departing Brayshaw Park Station at 1315 and 1500 to Omaka and at 1345 to Beaver Station. The train can be chartered on most days for tour groups, etc.

== Track ==
=== Main Line ===
The railway follows the Taylor River from Brayshaw Park in the southwest of Blenheim to Beaver Station, near a wharf where the River Queen boat formerly docked. There are locomotive run-around or passing loops at Brayshaw Park, Chinaman's Creek Crossing, Fulton Station and Beaver Station. The route is 5.1 km (3.2 mi) long and there are six bridges and five road overbridges. At Beaver Station the line passes under the Main North Line Taylor River bridge (light ~55lb per/yard (27kg/m). New Zealand Railways rail is used for majority of the line, and the track is buried up to rail head level as most is laid on reserve land.

=== Omaka Branch Line ===
The 1 km (0.6 mi) line to Omaka branches off shortly after leaving Brayshaw Park, crosses the Taylor River on a 46 m (151 ft) concrete bridge, ending at Omaka Corlett Station near the Omaka Aviation Heritage Centre and Omaka Classic Cars buildings. Tracklaying began during 2013-2014. It was expected that the extension would be completed in time for the 2015 Omaka Airshow, and was opened on Saturday, 21 March 2015. The society's efforts in constructing the branch line were recognised with an infrastructure award from Kiwi Rail at the FRONZ conference over Queen's birthday weekend in 2015.

=== Coordinates of terminal stations ===
- Brayshaw Park Station: 41°31′54″S 173°56′23″E
- Beaver Station: 41°30′43″S 173°57′36″E
- Omaka Station 41°32′13″S 173°55′42″E

== Rolling stock ==
=== Locomotives ===
Name	Builder	Year built	Class	Builder's number	Wheel arrangement	Engine	Year acquired	Photo
George	A & G Price	1951	Da	166	0-4-0	Isuzu 4HF1	1986	
-	A & G Price	1951	Da	168	0-4-0	Nissan TD27T	2016	
Murray	Ruston and Hornsby	1934	22/28 HP	170204	0-4-0	Lister JP3	1990	
Beaver	Ruston and Hornsby	1940	20DL	202969	0-4-0	Lister ST2	2012	
Onahau	Homebuilt	1990s	-	-	Bo-Bo	Nissan CD17/20	2012	
Donald	Probably Glasgow Railway Eng. Co.	1901	-	-	0-4-2 (originally 0-4-0)	Steam 6.5 x 10"	1990	

The railway has a small collection of diesel locomotives. In 1986, the society acquired A & G Price Da 6 from Horrell & Sons of Gore. This locomotive, first of a batch of three, was constructed to work coal mines in Ohai. It was overhauled in 2010, replacing the original Leyland powerplant with an Isuzu, and named "George" after a long serving member of the society. November 2016, the Society purchased A&G Price Da 8, last remaining sister of "George" and two bogie carriages. These came from Totara Springs Christian Centre near Matamata, after use on the Kerikeri Orchard Railway who originally obtained the locomotives from Ohai. The locomotive entered service in 2017 after refitting of ballast blocks each end of the frame, brake system modifications and a new livery. Ruston & Hornsby 170204 was purchased from the Ashburton Vintage Car Club, regauged and overhauled, officially entering service in 1997 named "Murray". The year 2012 was the arrival of two locomotives. A homebuilt hydraulic bogie locomotives, formerly used at a private railway in the Marlborough Sounds was donated by the constructors family, and named "Onahau" after its former home. A second Ruston, of 20DL type but with steam locomotive outline body, was purchased from Auckland and once worked at the short lived Footrot Flats theme park. It is not used for passenger service, but is still equipped with air brakes and is used mainly for workshop shunting.

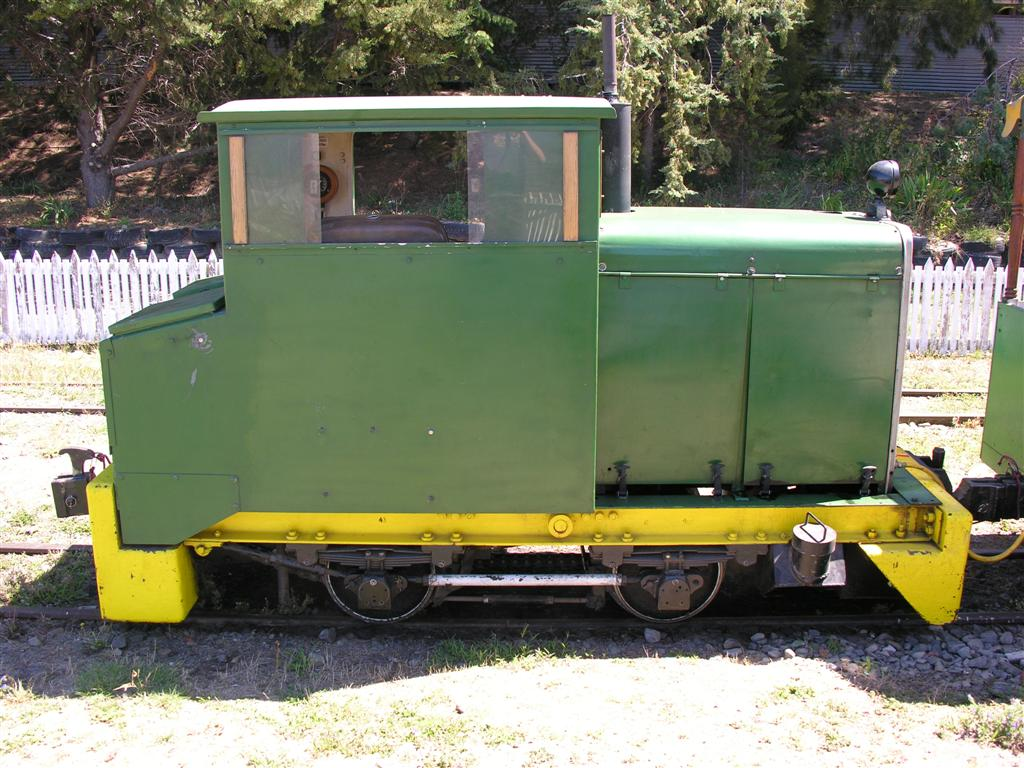

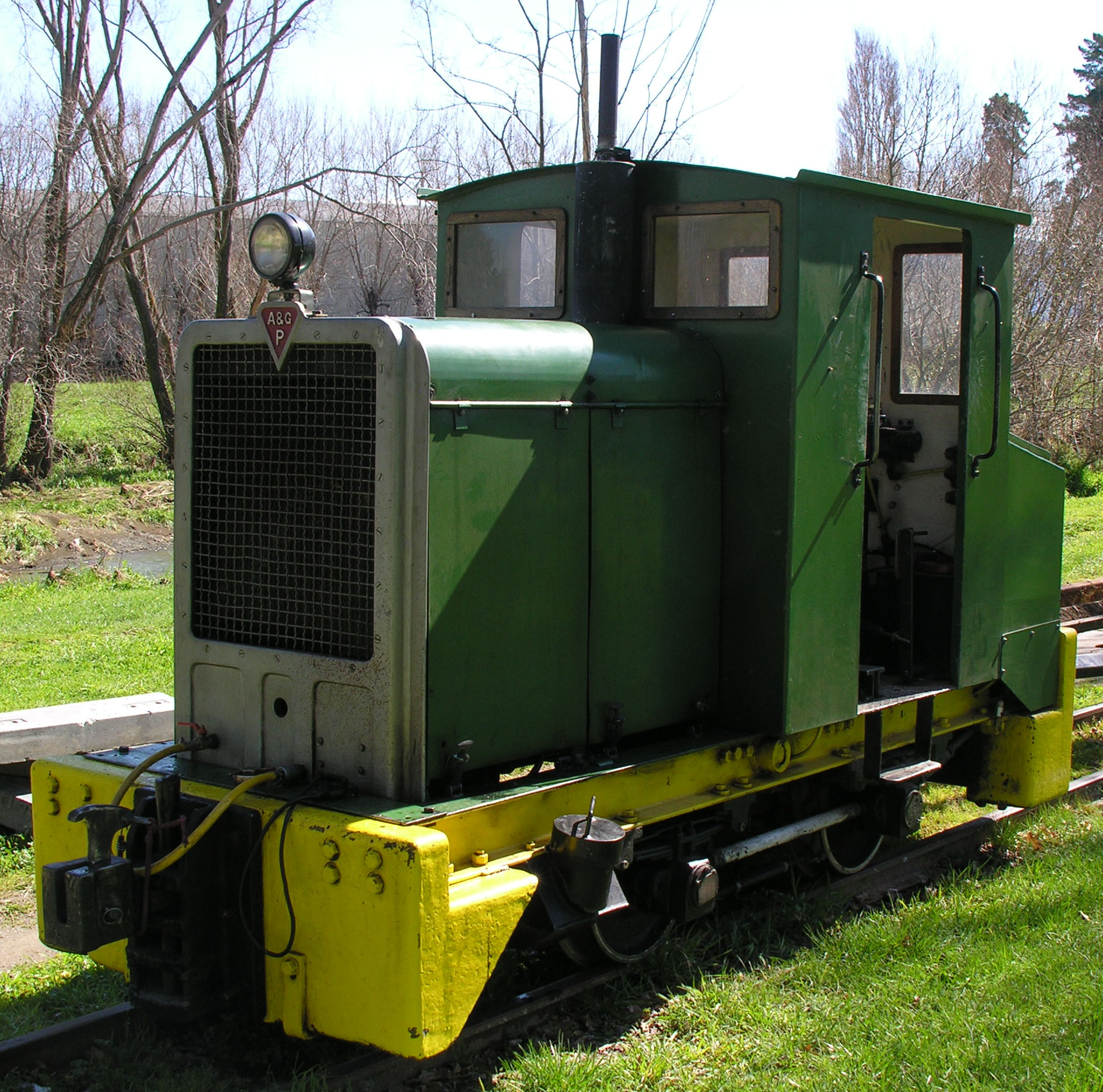

=== Rolling stock ===
Four carriages were built in 1989–1990 with wheelsets from some of the remaining Lake Grassmere Saltworks Hudson salt tipper wagons. The first three are 4.5 m (15 ft) long and seat 24 adults with toast rack seating. Car Four is slightly longer with the same seating capacity, but with wheelchair access available in the two end compartments. All carriages are air braked. A bogie diesel railcar, known as RM 1, was built in the 1990s, and sees occasional use, mostly on the Omaka branch line. The two ex-Matamata cars also are 6 m (20 ft) long and had toast rack seating. These two cars are undergoing rebuilding to become a permanent pair sharing a Jacobs bogie. Maintenance of the railway line is carried out using a work train consisting of multi deck tool wagon, flat deck wagons, and crew car for workers. Spraying of weeds and mowing of grass along the line are performed with separate purpose built trollies, pulled or pushed by the "Onahau" loco, due to its low speed.
