= Hillside Engineering =

Division of rail operator in Dunedin, New Zealand

Coordinates: 45.895°S 170.494°E

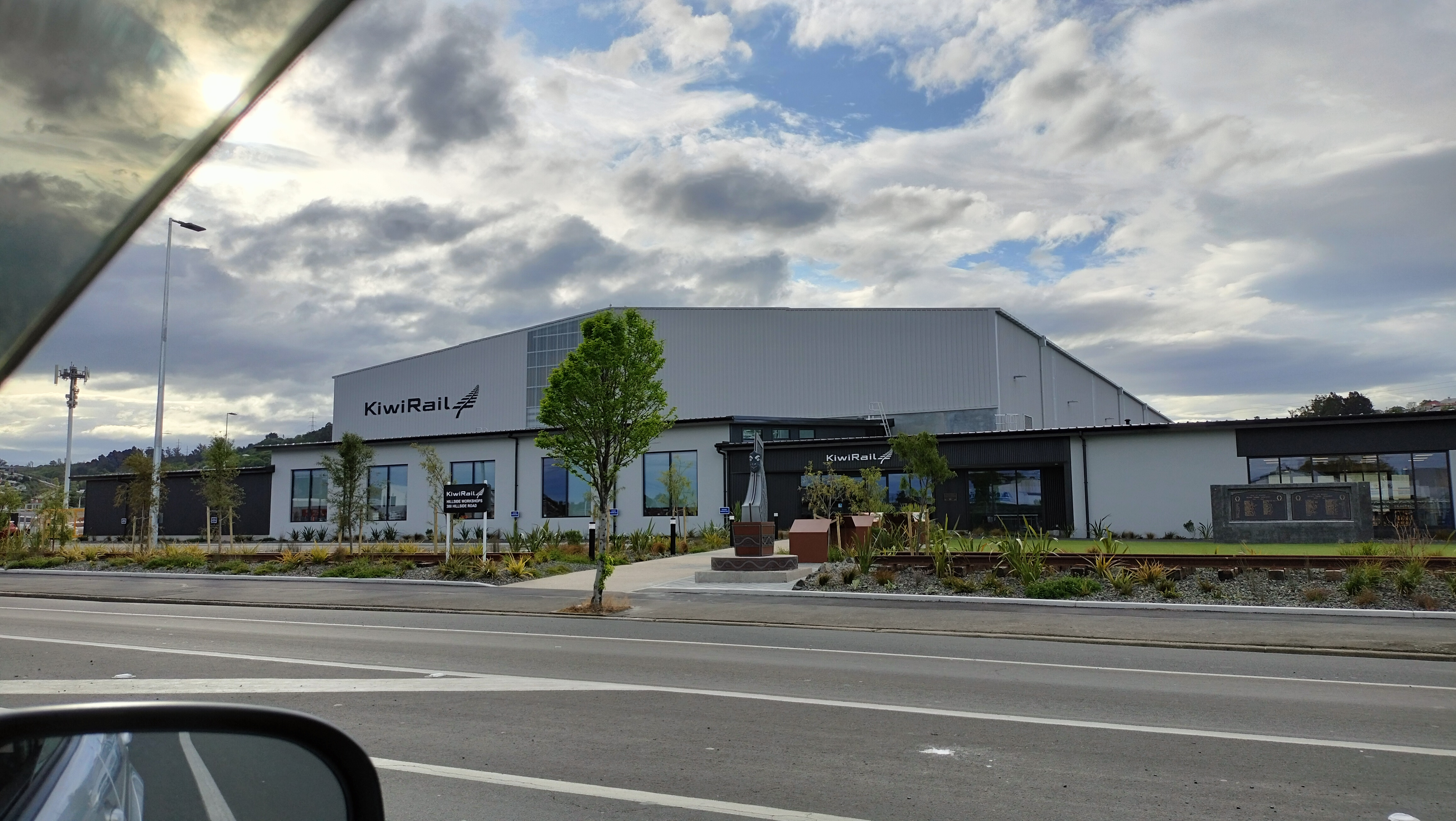
The front of the Hillside Workshops in October 2024. They stretch for over 500 metres along Hillside Road, South Dunedin.

Hillside Engineering is a trading division of the rail operator KiwiRail in Dunedin, New Zealand. First opened in 1901 and greatly expanded in the 1920s, Hillside Workshops constructed and reconstructed railway locomotives and rolling stock for the New Zealand Railways Department (NZR), as well as work for the marine industry in Dunedin, and other industries. By the 1930s, Hillside was one of the largest employers in Dunedin, with over 800 staff. Many well-known NZR locomotives were built at Hillside, including the J^{A} class steam locomotives, the last New Zealand-built steam locomotives in 1956, as well as the TR class shunting tractors, with the last one completed in 1978. In 2012, KiwiRail announced that it was selling part of Hillside, with the rest of the workshops closing later that year. In 2019, the government announced that the workshops would reopen, which happened in 2025.

== History ==
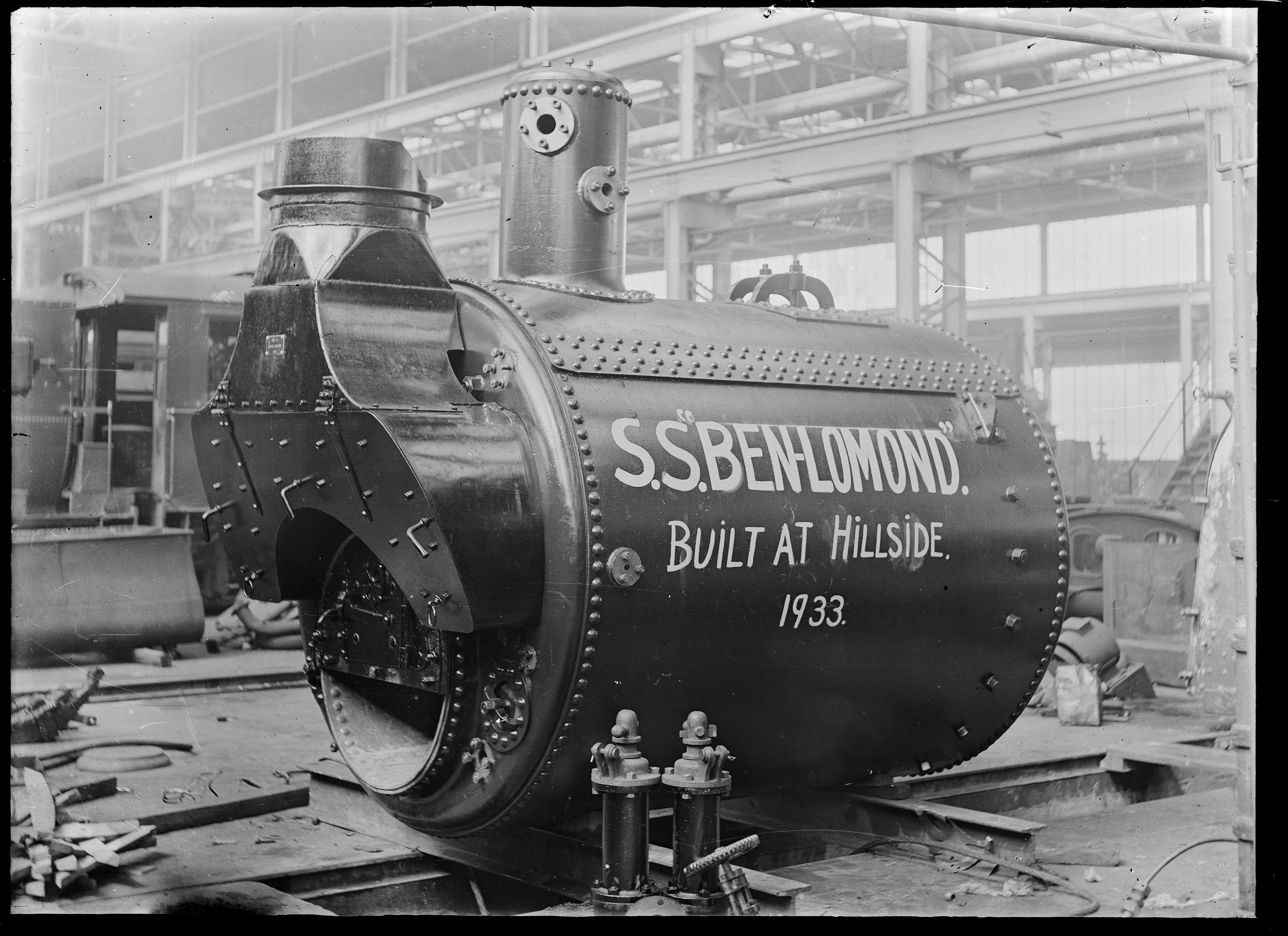
The Scotch marine-type steel boiler for the steamship SS Ben Lomond, built by Hillside Railway Workshops in 1933

Hillside was founded as the Hillside Workshops of NZR in 1901, though workshops had existed close to the current site in South Dunedin since 1875. The workshops, on Hillside Road, were one of South Dunedin's biggest employers and most imposing structures. Carriage shops were added about 1877 and the first locomotive, a W^{A} Class, was built late in 1897.

In 1924, the Fay-Raven Commission identified that a lack of manufacturing capacity at NZR's workshops was causing NZR to import most of its wagons, carriages and locomotives. The Commission recommended expanding NZR's workshops and improving their plant and equipment. As a result, the Hillside workshops were extensively enlarged from 1927-1929, and by 1935 employed over 800 workers, compared with 365 workers in 1925. At that stage, they were the largest railway workshops in the South Island, covering 16 acres (65,000 m^{2}). By 1945, staff numbers had been reduced to 550.

During the Second World War, Hillside and other NZR workshops produced many items relating to the war effort. In 1956, Hillside completed the last steam locomotive built by NZR, J^{A}1274.

In 1982, NZR was corporatised as the New Zealand Railways Corporation, with transport licensing to be deregulated. The Railways Corporation reviewed its workshops and maintenance operations nationally, closing a number of smaller sites (for example, East Town in Wanganui and Greymouth). Hillside then became the national rolling stock and component manufacturing plant. Further rationalisation of workshops followed in the early 1990s, with the Addington Workshops in Christchurch closing in 1990, and Otahuhu Workshops in Auckland closing in 1992. Hillside then became the national rolling stock centre during the Tranz Rail era, building many of the new bulk wagons Tranz Rail introduced, including the longest container wagons in New Zealand, the IC class, of which 50 were built by 2001. In 2002, Tranz Rail outsourced locomotive maintenance to Alstom.

One of the ends of the nearby Carisbrook sports ground - demolished in 2012 - was known as "The Hillside End" or "The Workshops End" due to the presence of the former stadium's larger neighbour.

=== Passenger Car Projects ===
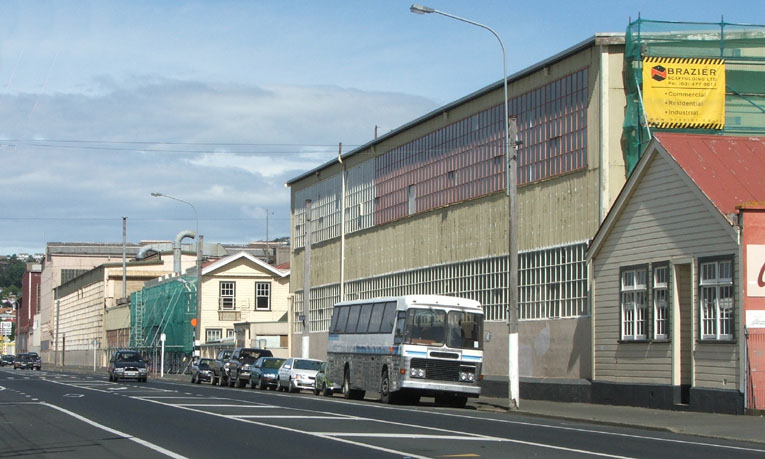
The front of the Hillside Workshops Hillside Road in November 2007

In 2003, Hillside won the contract to refurbish several retired Queensland Rail SX cars, purchased from the Australia's Zig Zag Railway. Following a 14-week overhaul, the carriages were delivered to Auckland for commuter service, operated in push-pull formation with a DBR diesel locomotive at each end.

In 2004, Hillside started work on rebuilding imported British Rail Mark 2 passenger cars for use in Auckland on commuter trains. The cars were stripped and rebuilt for use in a push-pull consist, with a cab control car at one end (classed SD), with several standard cars (classed SA) in between and a diesel locomotive providing motive power at the other end (either a DC or DFT). A diesel generator which provides on board electrical power is fitted into a noise-insulated compartment in each SD car. The SA/SD rebuilding project ended in 2010.

In 2009, KiwiRail announced that Hillside Engineering had won the contract to build 26 new passenger cars for its two South Island long-distance passenger trains, the TranzAlpine and the Coastal Pacific, classed AK. Part of the project also includes converting 6 existing AG vans into 2 open-air viewing vans and 4 luggage vans. In November 2011, the new cars entered service on the Coastal Pacific.

In 2010, there was a local call for Auckland's new electric railcars to be built at Hillside Workshops.

=== Sale and closure ===
On 19 April 2012 KiwiRail announced it was putting Hillside on the market for sale. In November 2012 KiwiRail announced it had sold part of the business to Australian firm Bradken, and the rest would be closed.

In November 2012, KiwiRail announced it had sold part of the business to Australian firm Bradken, and the rest would be closed. 90 jobs were lost. The opposition Labour Party said the sale was a "political decision", but KiwiRail said there wasn't enough work to keep the workshop operating. Hillside had earlier lost a contract to build new wagons for KiwiRail after it was revealed that it was not competitive and would not be able to deliver the wagons within the time frame specified. KiwiRail said they intended to allocate some work to the new owners, while other work was to be done at the company's Hutt workshops near Wellington.

The workshops continued to be used for some maintenance work by KiwiRail with a skeleton staff. In October 2019, the New Zealand Government announced that it would be investing NZ$20 million into revitalising Hillside Engineering as a major mechanical hub and engineering facility to service Kiwi Rail's locomotives and rollingstock.

=== Reconstruction, 2019–2024 ===
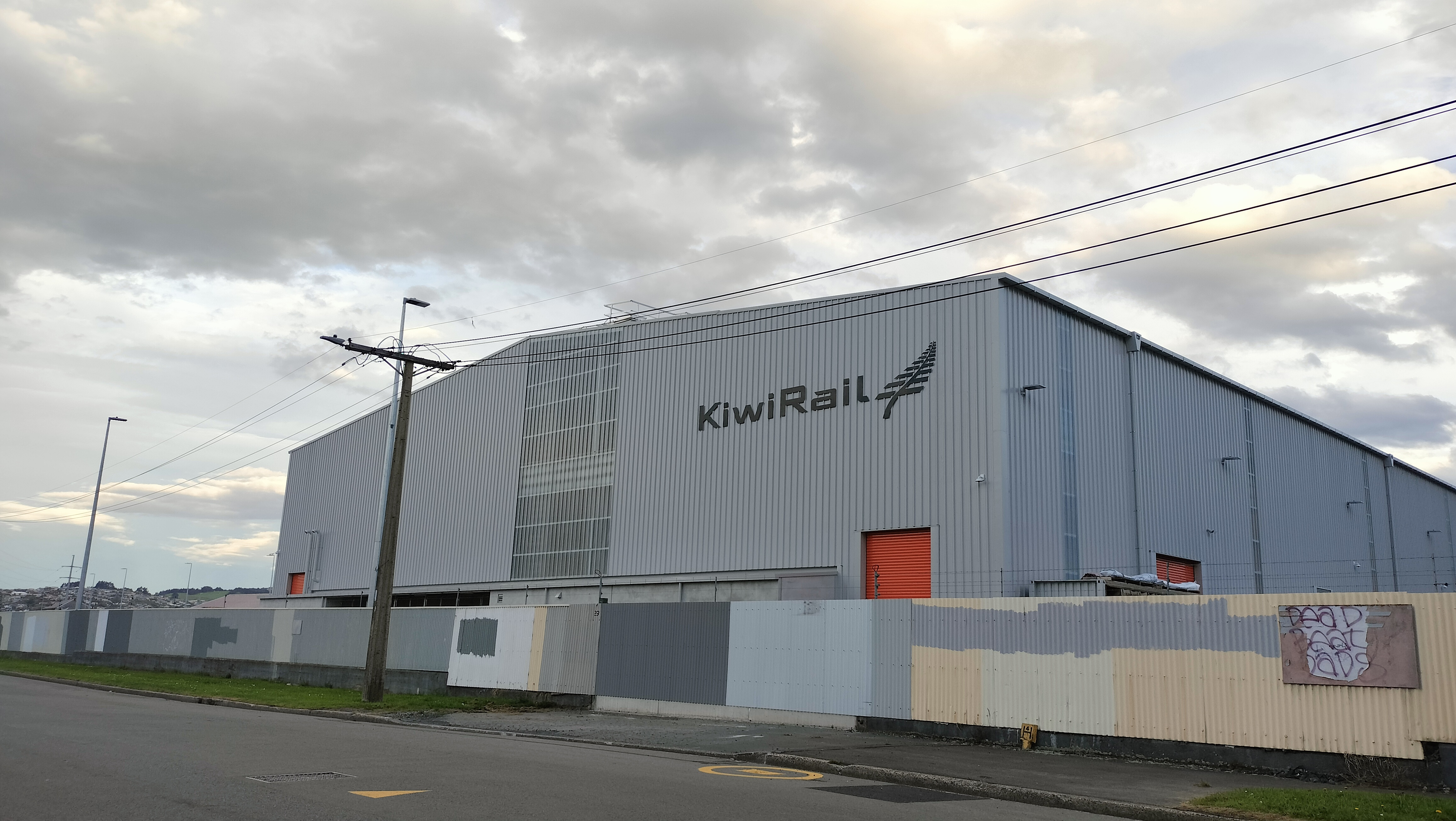
The rear of the Hillside Railway Workshops as seen from Wilkie Road in October 2024.

In the intervening years, Hillside Engineering's workshops continued to be used for some locomotive and wagon maintenance work by KiwiRail with a skeleton staff for overflow work from the KiwiRail's Hutt Workshops and maintenance and conversion work on South Island rolling stock. On 30 October 2019, Regional Development Minister Shane Jones announced that the Sixth Labour Government would be investing $20 million into re-establishing Hillside workshop as a mechanical hub and heavy engineering facility to service KiwiRail's locomotives and rolling stock. This investment involved upgrading the two main workshop buildings and overhauling the mechanical plant.

On 20 May 2021, State Owned Enterprises Minister David Clark confirmed that Hillside Engineering would receive NZ$85 million for new facilities to assemble about 1,500 wagons as part of the 2021 New Zealand budget. Transport Minister Michael Wood also stated that about 445 jobs would be created between Hillside and a new South Island Mechanical Maintenance Hub based in Christchurch. The Hillside investment would also support 150 construction jobs and 45 operational KiwiRail jobs including apprenticeships. To promote the refurbishment of Hillside and the 2021 budget, Prime Minister Jacinda Ardern, Deputy Prime Minister Grant Robertson, and Dunedin MPs David Clark and Ingrid Leary visited the workshops on 25 May 2021. The opposition ACT Party and the New Zealand Taxpayers' Union claimed the Hillside investment was wasteful, likening the Government's actions to Communist policies in North Korea and Poland. In response to criticism, Rail and Maritime Union national secretary Wayne Butson contended that the Hillside redevelopment project would benefit both the Otago region and New Zealand.

In early January 2022, the ACT Party obtained documents under the Official Information Act 1982 showing that KiwiRail officials had expressed concerns about the Government's NZ$85 million budget allocation to reopen the Hillside Workshops; estimating that it would cost between NZ$305 and 400 million to properly equip. KiwiRail had recommended allocating NZ$771 million from the budget for the National Land Transport Fund to be spent on rail, NZ$197.9 million in capital for resilience and a further $1.27 billion for new rolling stock and mechanical depots. The Government had reduced these bids by about NZ$800million. KiwiRail estimated that it would have to import 780 wagons during the two-year period when Hillside Engineering was being rebuilt. While the ACT Party's transport spokesperson Simon Court claimed the Hillside project was unsound and based on political expediency, Transport Minister Wood and State Owned Enterprises Minister Clark claimed that the reopened workshops would bring good, high-paying engineering jobs back to Dunedin after the previous National Government shut it down.

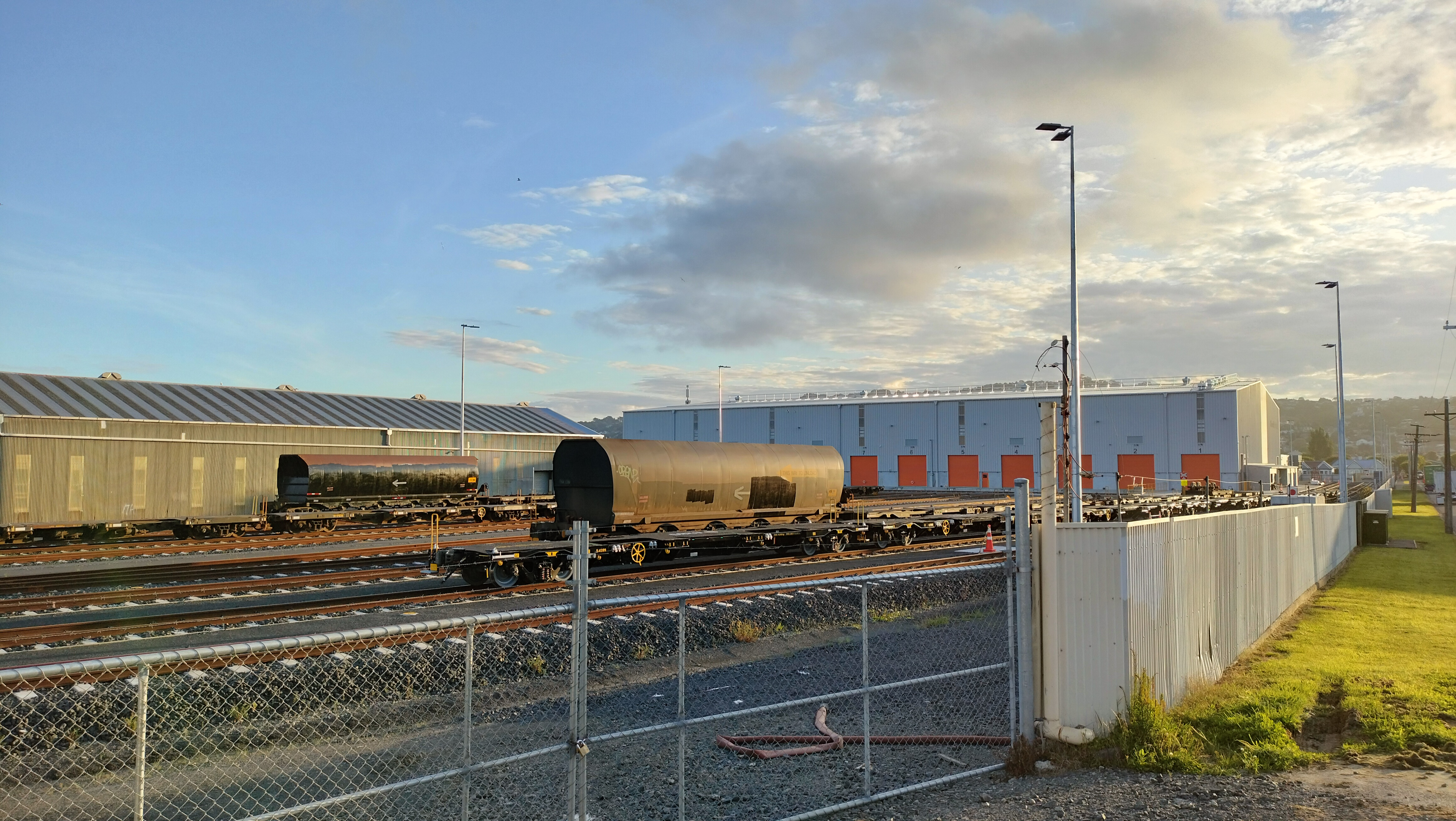
Hillside Workshops' rail yard as seen from Wilkie Road in October 2024

In mid-August 2022, Newshub reported that KiwiRail had altered the design of Hillside Workshops due to increasing cost pressures. According to a document obtained by Newshub, the workshops' benefit-cost ratio was reduced from an already low 0.22 to 0.2. By 2022, the New Zealand Government had allocated NZ$105 million to the Hillside workshop redevelopment programme, including NZ$20 million from the Provincial Growth Fund and NZ$85 million from the 2024 New Zealand budget.

By early September 2023, two back shunts had been installed at the back of the facility. These tracks will be used to move locomotives, rail wagons and carriages around the facility. They are expected to be completed by the end of 2023.

By February 2024, KiwiRail regional manager Alan Hill confirmed significant progress in the redevelopment of the workshops, which were expected to be completed by mid-2024. 90% of the demolition material had been recycled. The redevelopment was funded with nearly NZ$20 million from the Sixth Labour Government's Provincial Growth Fund in 2019, NZ$85 million from the 2021 New Zealand budget to fund upgrades and wagon assembly, and NZ$23 million in government investment to replace ageing locomotives and wagons. These investments included a multi-purpose 5,500 sqm workshop with 21 workstations, cranes, jets and a new rail yard layout with fully electric shunt engines.

=== Reopening, 2025–present ===
Wagon assembly began in March 2024, with 401 wagons assembled by April 2025. By mid-August 2024, KiwiRail had reached an agreement with the Takutai Trust and Southern Heritage Trust to repurpose the former Manager's House on Hillside Road as a heritage site.

Money for redevelopment ($85 million) was allocated in 2020 and completed by May 2025, when assembly of 401 urgently needed wagons from imported kitsets was completed. 22 of the 254 buildings on the site were demolished and asbestos removed.

Hillside Engineering officially reopened on 16 May 2025 during a reopening ceremony attended by Deputy Prime Minister Winston Peters, Regional Development Minister Shane Jones, former Labour MP Clare Curran, local Labour MP Ingrid Leary and KiwiRail CEO Peter Reidy, and Rail and Maritime Trade Union general Secretary Todd Valster. During the ceremony, Peters said that the return of Hillside Engineering was a statement of the Sixth National Government's "belief in the city of Dunedin." The opening ceremony was picketed by several dozen protesters representing Gaza, transgender rights, pay equity and climate change.

== Locomotives classes built at Hillside ==
Many locomotive classes were built at Hillside:

- DSC
- C (1930) (12)
- J^{A} (35)
- K^{B} (6)
- L
- W^{A} (6)
- W^{AB} (20)
- W^{F} (16)
- W^{G} (20)
- W^{W} (48)
- TR (9) (1973–78, Diesel shunters)

Hillside also rebuilt the following locomotive classes:

- DG (10)
- G (1928) (6)
- W^{E} (3)
- X (1)

== See also ==
- New Zealand British Rail Mark 2 carriage, rebuilt at Hillside Workshops and Hutt Workshops from British Railways Mark 2 carriages
- NZR Addington Workshops, Christchurch
- NZR Hutt Workshops, Lower Hutt/Wellington
- NZR Newmarket Workshops Auckland then Otahuhu Workshops, Auckland
- New Zealand Railways Department
