= McGregor and Company =

McGregor and Company Ltd was a heavy engineering company based in Dunedin, New Zealand. Apart from building the notable steam ship Earnslaw, the company also built early 20th century steam locomotives, of which there are no survivors. The company's factory was located in Thomas Burns Street, directly across the railway tracks from the city's railway station.
