= SS Ben Lomond (1872) =

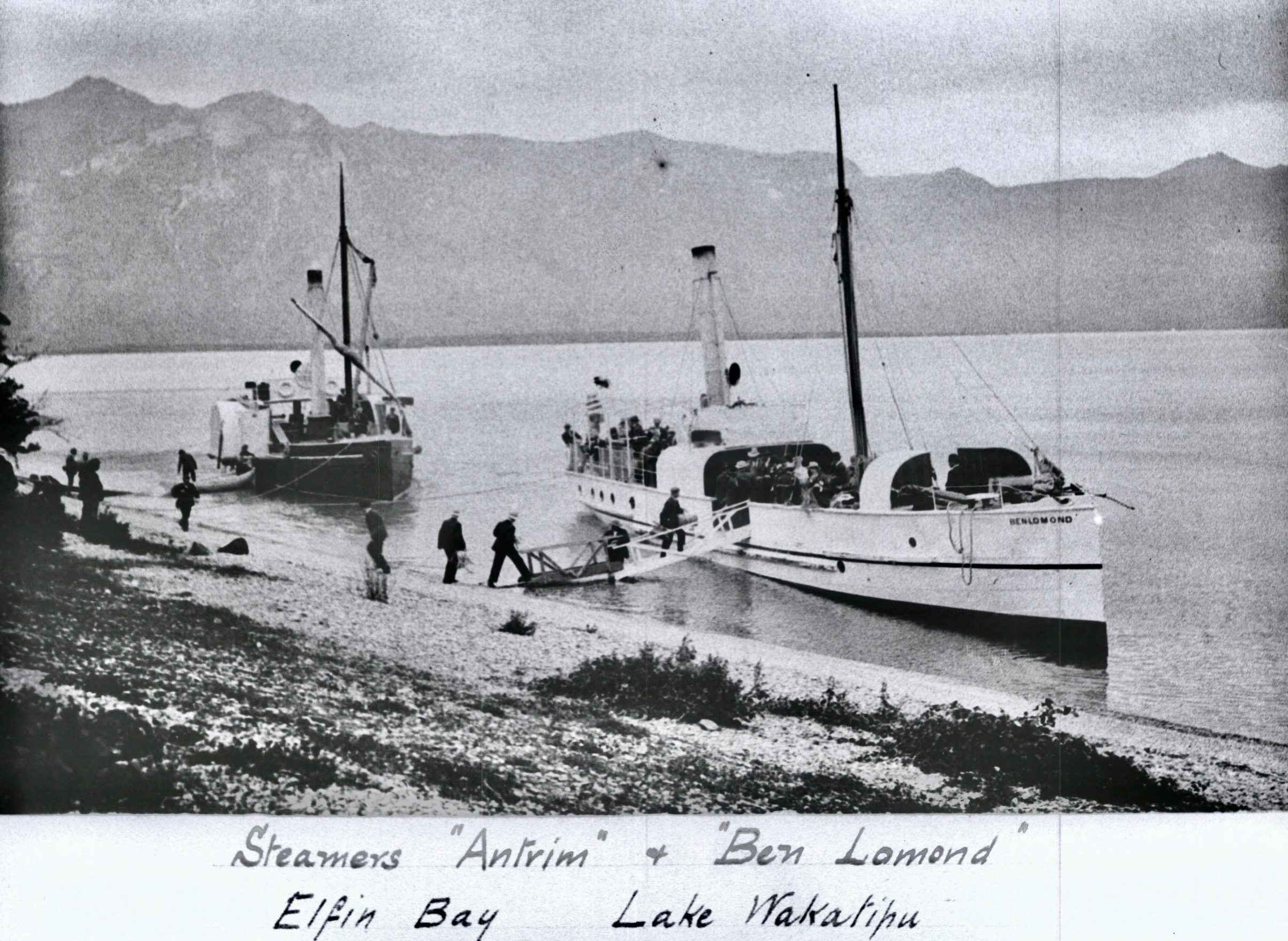
- PS Antrim and SS Ben Lomond

History

New Zealand
- Builder: Messrs Sparrow and Thomas, Dunedin
- Launched: 10 February 1872
- Fate: Scuttled on 28 October 1952

General characteristics
- Displacement: 33.47 tons
- Tons burthen: 46.30 tons
- Length: 82 ft 8 in (25.20 m)
- Beam: 12 ft 8 in (3.86 m)
- Draught: 5 ft (1.5 m)
- Depth: 6 ft 7 in (2.01 m)
- Propulsion: Twin screw steamer, two 30 horse power jet condensing steam engines
- Speed: 9.24 knots
- Capacity: 25 tons cargo, 131 passengers

SS Ben Lomond was an 1872 twin-screw steamer plying the waters of Lake Wakatipu in New Zealand. For some years she was the oldest vessel on Lloyd's Register.

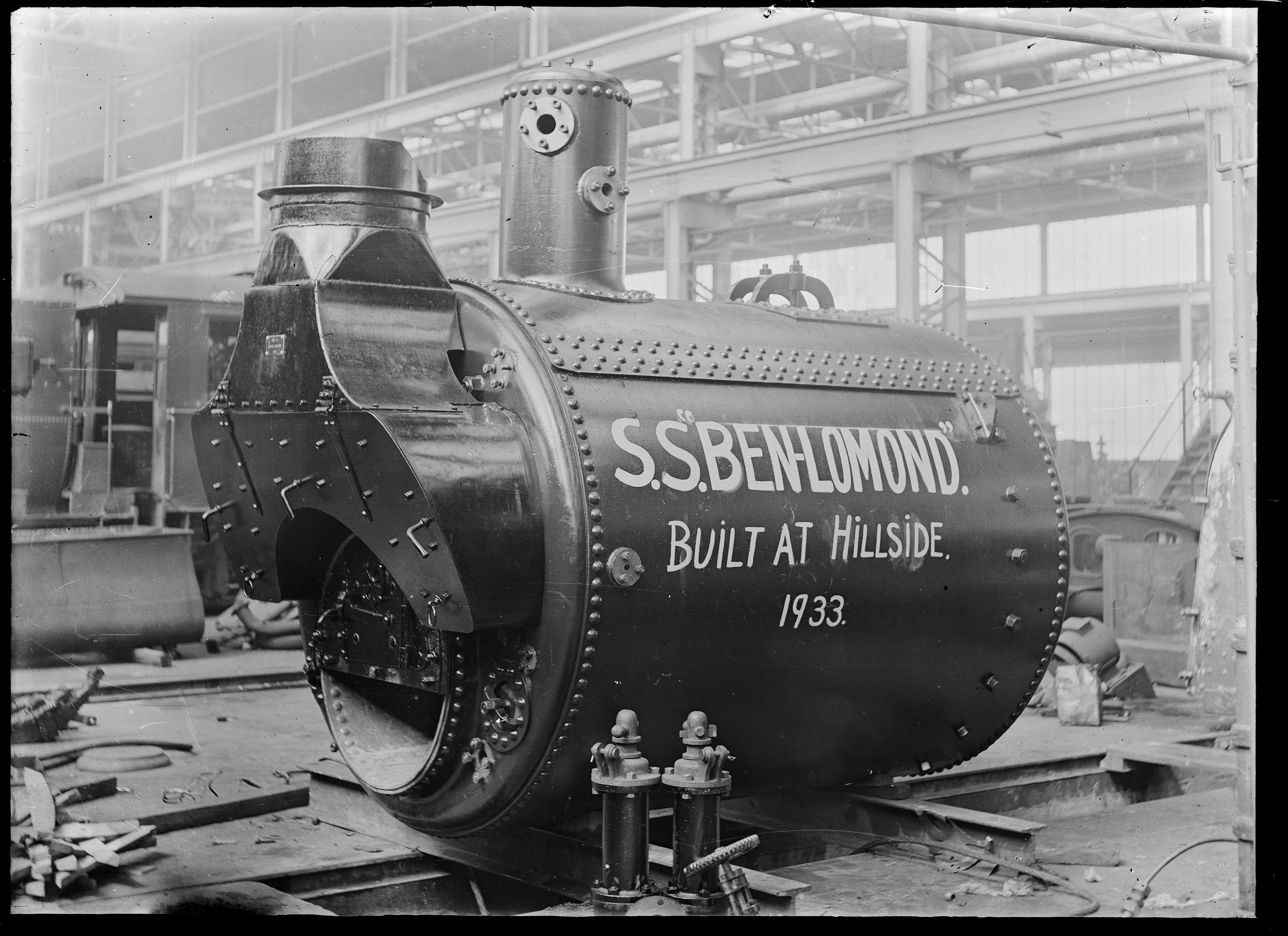
The new Scotch marine-type steel boiler for the Ben Lomond, built by Hillside Railway Workshops, Dunedin in 1933

The vessel was launched as Jane Williams at Queenstown on 10 February 1872 and registered at Dunedin on 26 March the same year. The vessel's name was changed to Ben Lomond, after the mountain of the same name, on 12 May 1886. She was withdrawn from service on 30 June 1951 and sunk off Kingston Bay on 28 October 1952. Ben Lomond worked with her running mates, the paddle steamers Antrim and Mountaineer and the twin screw steamer Earnslaw, transporting sheep, cattle and passengers to the surrounding high country stations.
