= TSS Earnslaw =

Historic ship in New Zealand

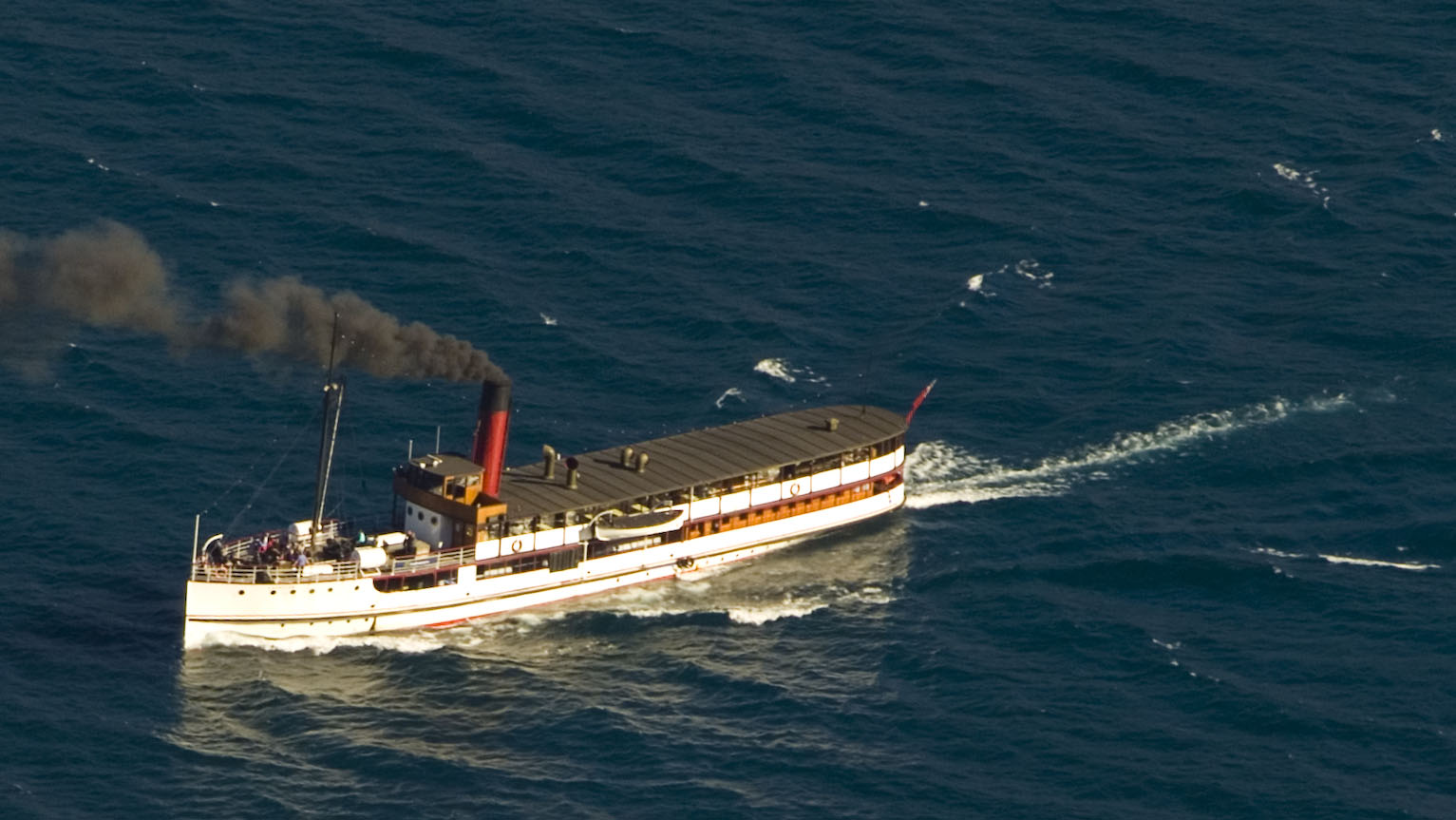
- TSS Earnslaw

History

New Zealand
- Name: Earnslaw
- Owner: RealNZ
- Builder: McGregor and Company, Dunedin
- Cost: £20,850 ($41,700)
- Laid down: 4 July 1911
- Launched: 24 February 1912
- Maiden voyage: 18 August 1912
- Refit: 1954 - Steam engines dismantled and reconditioned
- Identification: IMO number: 8138190
- Status: In service

General characteristics
- Type: Twin-screw steamer
- Tonnage: 330 GRT
- Length: 51.2 m (168 ft 0 in)
- Beam: 7.3 m (23 ft 11 in)
- Draught: 2.1 m (6 ft 11 in)
- Installed power: Twin locomotive-type coal fired boilers, working pressure 180 psi (1,200 kPa)
- Propulsion: Twin triple expansion, jet condensing vertical marine steam engines producing 500 hp (370 kW) at 145 rpm; cylinder diameters, 13 in (330 mm) (high pressure), 22 in (560 mm) (intermediate), 34 in (860 mm) (low pressure); cylinder stroke, 18 in (460 mm)
- Speed: 13 knots (24 km/h; 15 mph)
- Complement: 11 crew, 389 passengers
- Notes: Coal capacity 14 tons

TSS Earnslaw is a 1912 Edwardian twin screw steamer based at Lake Wakatipu in New Zealand. She is one of the oldest tourist attractions in Central Otago, and the only remaining commercial passenger-carrying coal-fired steamship in the Southern Hemisphere.

== History ==
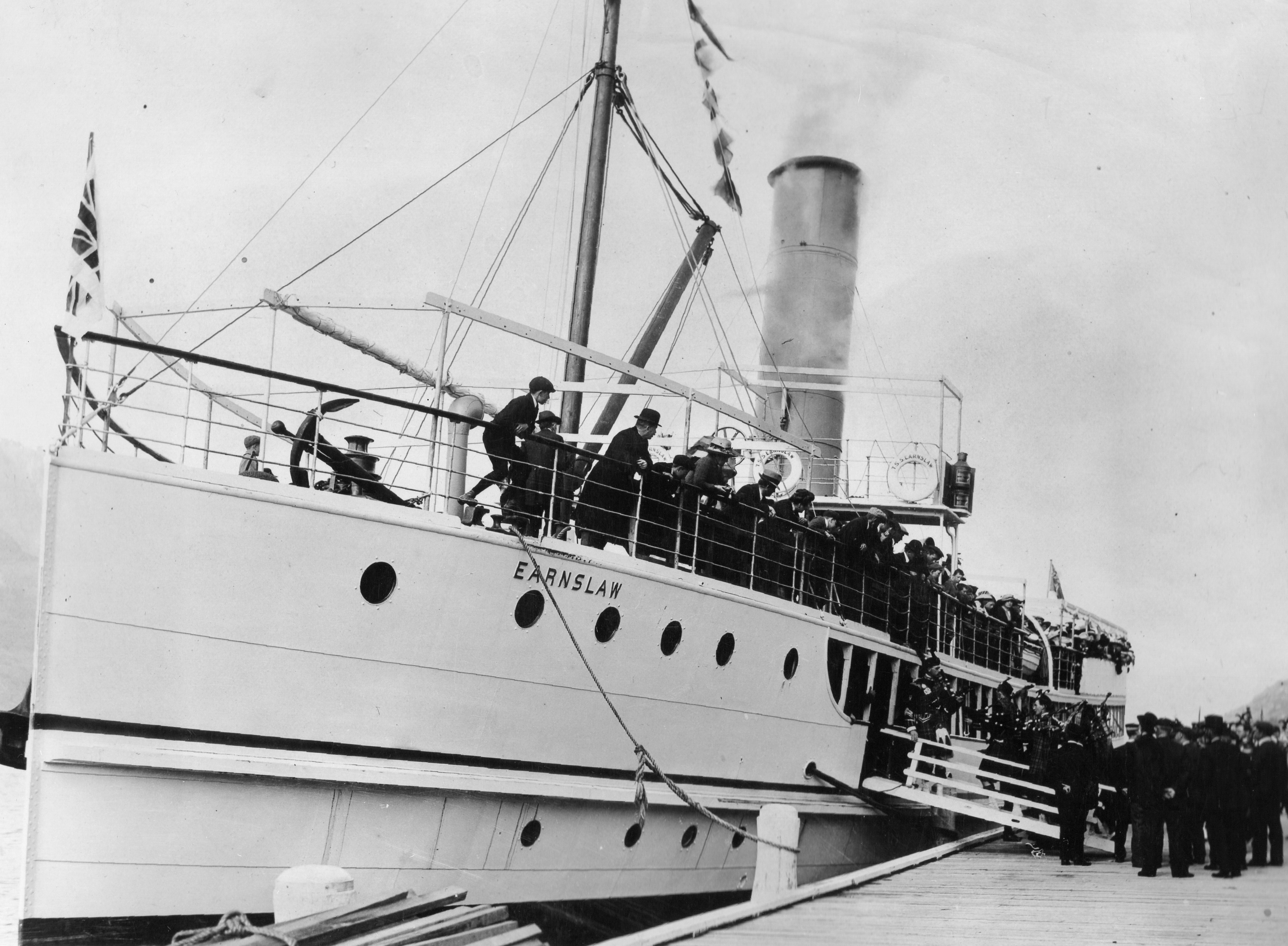
TSS Earnslaw, shortly after launch in 1912

At the beginning of the 20th century, New Zealand Railways (NZR) awarded a £20,850 contract to John McGregor and Company shipbuilders of Dunedin to build a steamship for Lake Wakatipu at their Otago foundry and engineering works. Earnslaw was designed by naval architect Hugh McRae and was based on a Siemens-Martin steel hull design and using kauri for the decking. Propulsion was provided by twin coal-fired triple-expansion, jet-condensing, vertically inclined engines. The keel was laid on 4 July 1911. The ship was named after Mount Earnslaw, a 2,889-metre (9,478 ft) peak at the head of Lake Wakatipu. She was to be 51.2 metres (168 ft 0 in) long, the biggest boat on the lake, and the largest steamship built in New Zealand. After construction was completed, she was dismantled, and all the one-quarter-inch (6.4 mm) steel hull plates were numbered for reconstruction. The parts were then loaded on to a goods train and transported across the South Island from Dunedin to Kingston at the southern end of Lake Wakatipu.

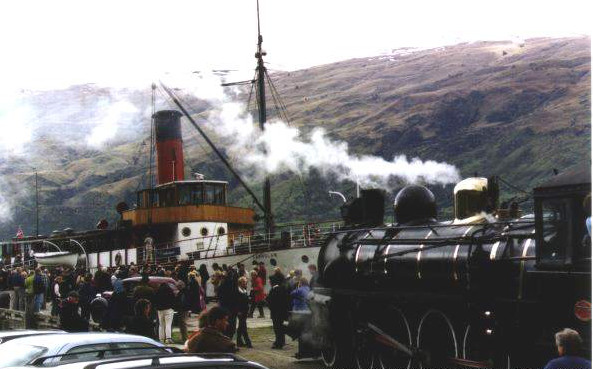
Kingston Quayside with the Kingston Flyer, 2002

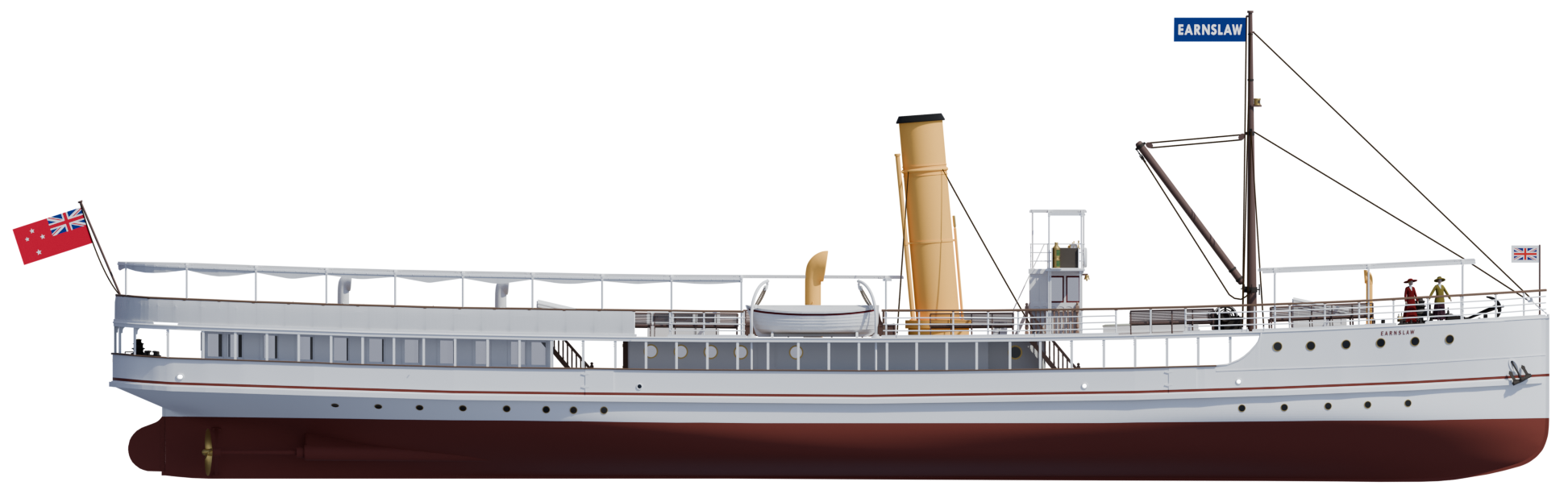
TSS Earnslaw Starboard Profile (1912)

After the hull was re-assembled, Earnslaw was launched on 24 February 1912. On 3 August, after the construction of the ship was fully completed, trials were commenced. On 18 August 1912, Earnslaw was fired up for her maiden voyage to Queenstown, with Minister of Marine John A. Millar as captain.

She then became a valuable vessel for NZR and was known as the "Lady of the Lake". Earnslaw worked with her sister ships, the paddle steamers Antrim and Mountaineer and the screw steamer Ben Lomond, transporting sheep, cattle and passengers to the surrounding high country stations.

In 1968, Earnslaw was very nearly scrapped. She was leased by Fiordland Travel (subsequently Real Journeys, and then RealNZ) in 1969, and later purchased by the same company in 1982. She was taken out of service for a major refit in 1984. Her 12-metre (39 ft)-high funnel was painted bright red, with the hull a snow-white, and her kauri timber decks glassed in.

In 1984, the composer Ron Goodwin created a New Zealand Suite of six pieces recording his impressions of places he had visited. One of these is the "Earnslaw Steam Theme" based on the rhythm of the ship's engines, which he wrote after a trip to Lake Wakatipu. In March 1990, Queen Elizabeth II and Prince Philip travelled on Earnslaw. Other royalty who have been on board include the Prince of Thailand and the King and Queen of Belgium.

In June 2021, a report into greenhouse gas emissions in Otago calculated that in the 12-month period July 2018 to June 2019, Earnslaw emitted 4,076 tonnes of 'carbon dioxide-equivalent'. This represented 1 percent of all transport-related greenhouse gas emissions in the Queenstown-Lakes District. In October 2021, RealNZ announced that it was investigating carbon-neutral or carbon-zero means of powering the vessel. At a celebration in 2022 of Earnslaw completing 110 years of service on the lake, RealNZ said that it was exploring biofuel, wood pellets and hydrogen as alternative sources of boiler fuel, but that a decision was a few years away.

In 2025, Earnslaw underwent its longest and most significant survey in its 113-year working career. The work carried out at the Kelvin Heights slipway included completely removing both engines from the vessel for cleaning, overhaul and replacement of parts. The engines were transported to Invercargill for overhaul. Some hull plates were replaced, and both boilers were retubed.

== Captains ==
The ship's captains include the following:

- George Herbert (Captain 1935)
- Tom Luckie (NZR Captain 19?? - 1952)
- Alexander Munro (NZR Captain 1952 - 1955)
- Richard John (Pat) Bennetts (NZR Captain 1955 - 1964 - he was on the crew for 30 years)
- Patrick R. McSoriley (NZR Captain 1964 - 1968 - he first joined the crew in 1941)
- Sandy McLean (Captain 1968 - 1969)
- Maru Bradshaw (Captain 1969 - 1991)

== Heritage status ==
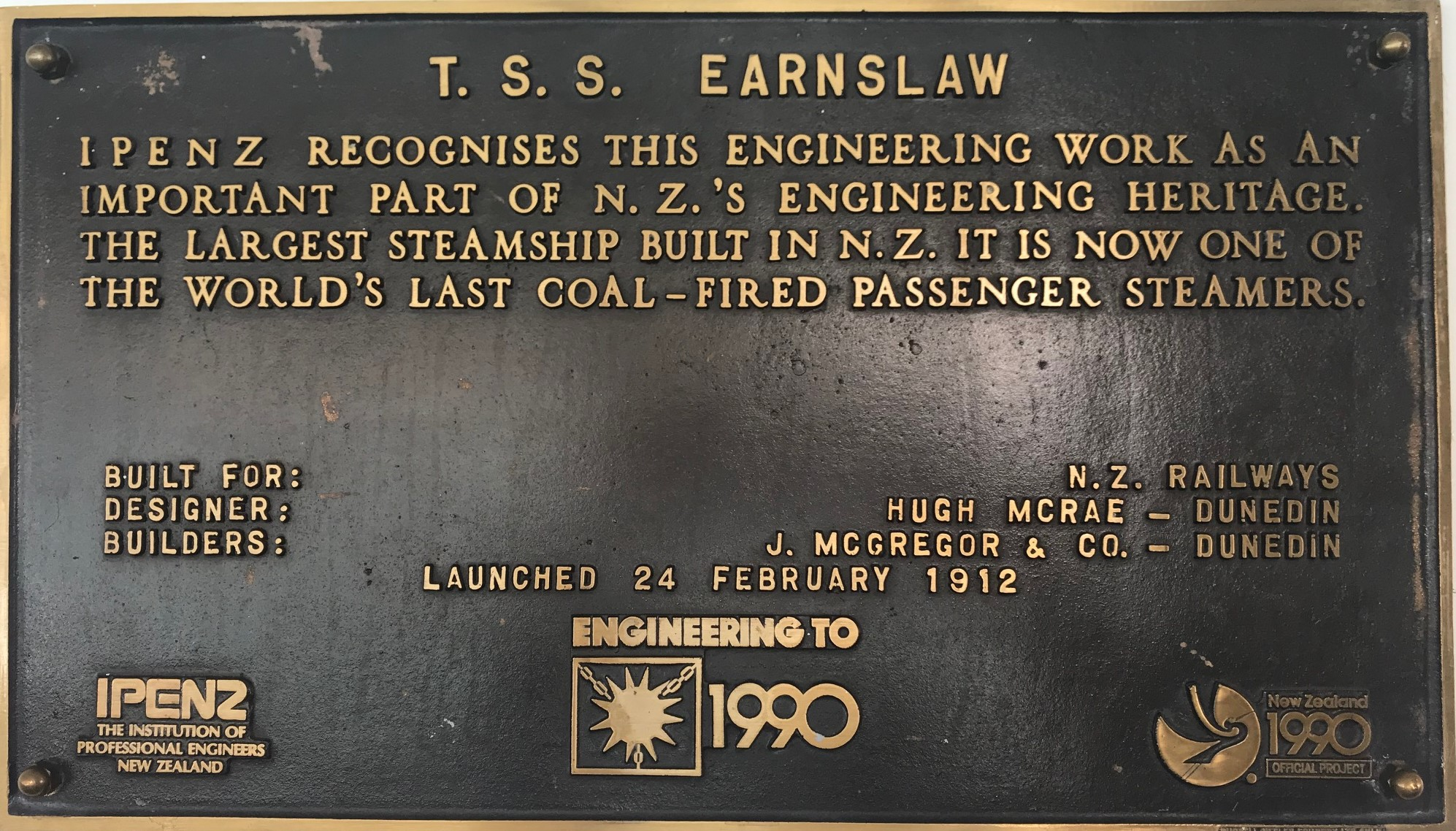
Plaque

A detailed history of Earnslaw including archival photographs has been published in the New Zealand Maritime Record maintained by the NZ National Maritime Museum.

In 1990, Earnslaw was recognised as a significant part of New Zealand's engineering heritage by the Institution of Professional Engineers New Zealand. The recognition was part of the “Engineering to 1990” project celebrating the country's sesquicentenary in 1990. A plaque was fixed to the vessel to that reads: "IPENZ recognises this engineering work as an important part of New Zealand's engineering heritage. The largest steamship built in New Zealand it is now one of the world’s last coal-fired passenger steamers".

In July 2013, the Southern Heritage Trust unveiled a plaque on the Dunedin Railway Station overbridge commemorating the location of the McGregor & Co factory where Earnslaw was built.

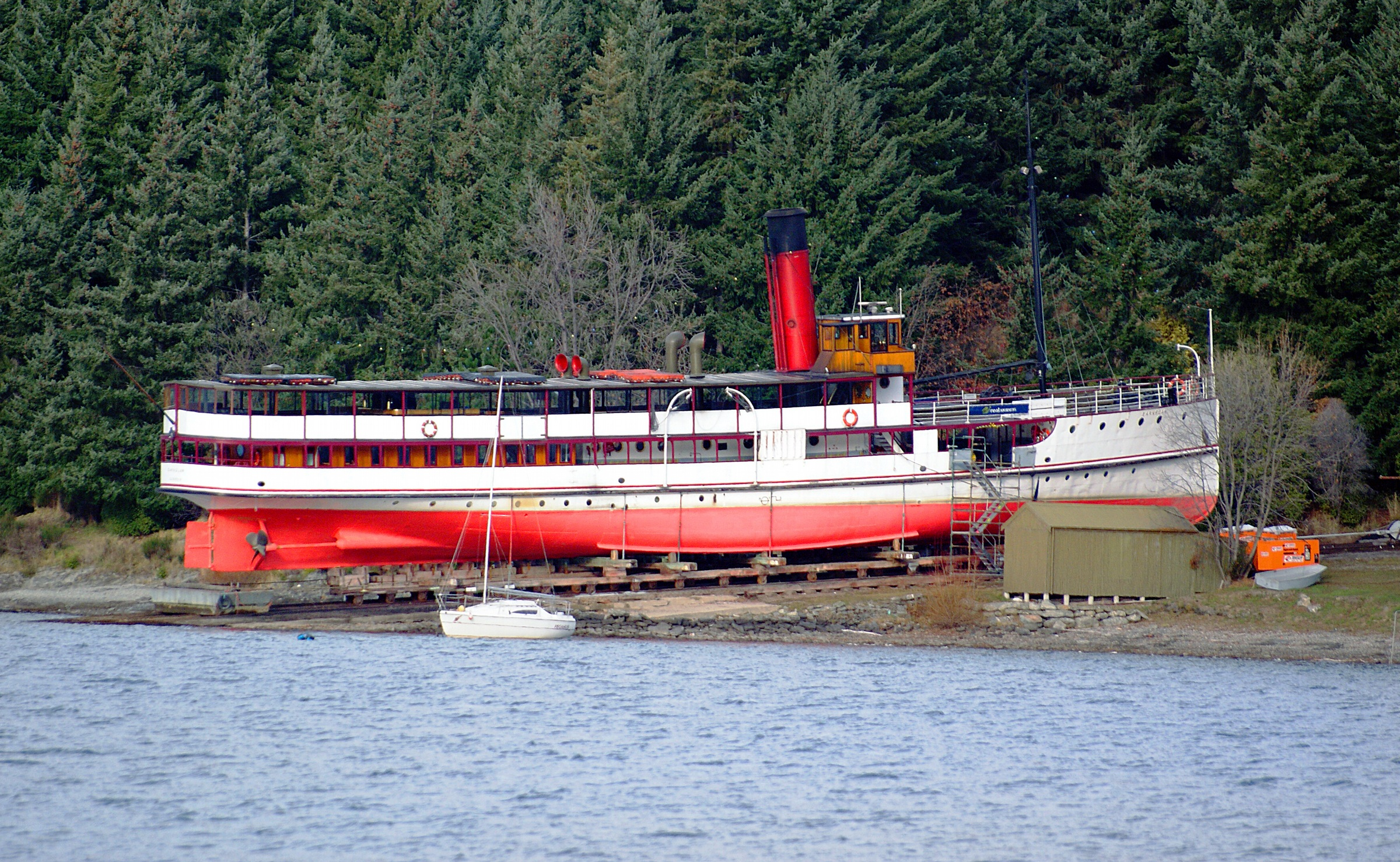
Earnslaw on slipway

In December 2017, the New Zealand Ministry for Culture and Heritage recognised Earnslaw as one of twelve significant sites in Otago to be included in its Landmarks Whenua Tohunga programme.

Earnslaw is winched out of the lake on a cradle when major surveys are required. There is an historic slipway for this purpose at the south west corner of the Frankton arm of Lake Wakatipu. The slipway is equipped with a steam engine driven winch. The boiler and steam engine used to power the winch were originally in service on Lake Wakatipu in the paddle steamer Antrim, originally launched in 1869. Antrim was dismantled from 1920, but the boiler and engine were recovered for use on the slipway. The Antrim engine is recognised as a significant part of New Zealand's engineering heritage.

== Current status ==
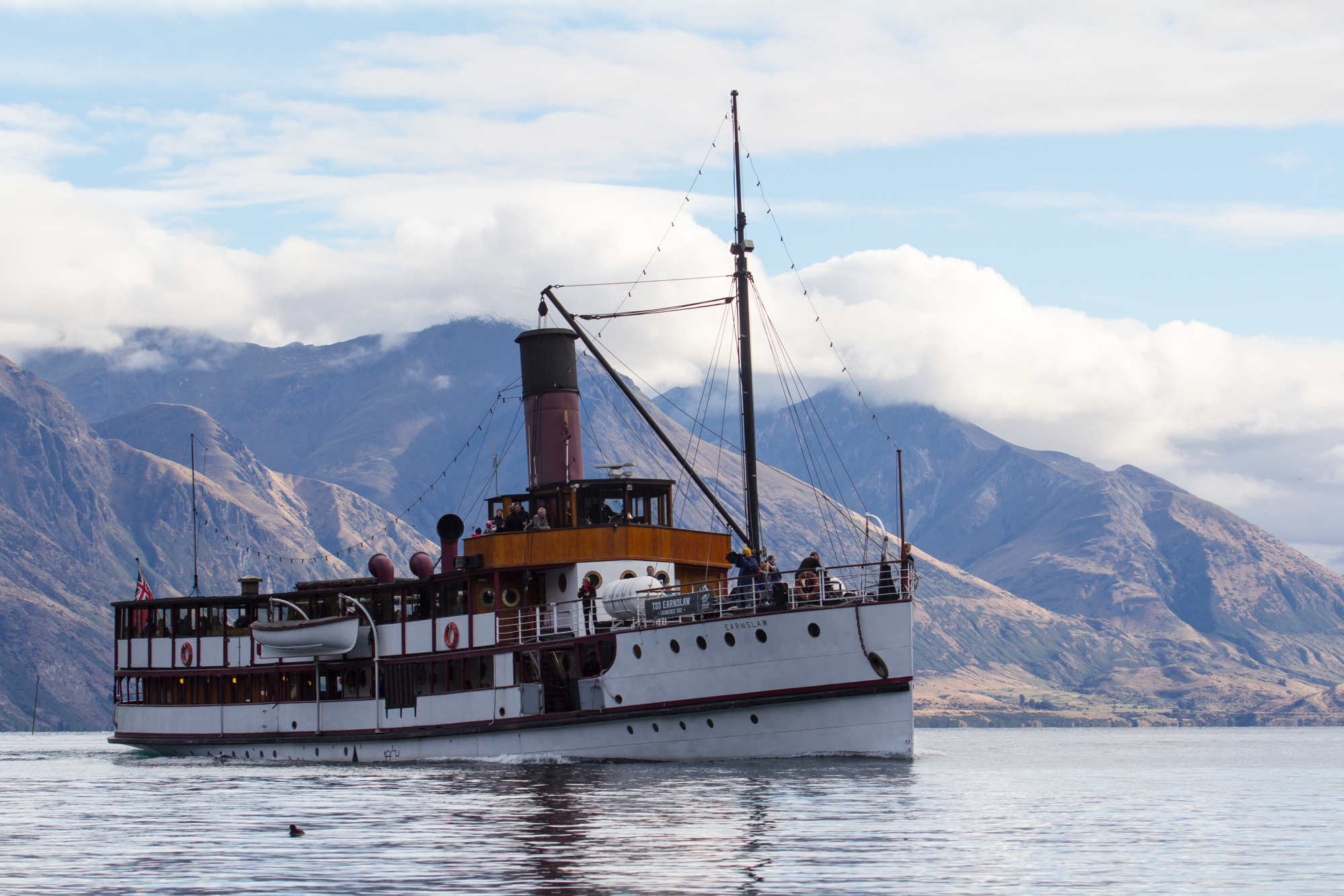
Earnslaw in 2015

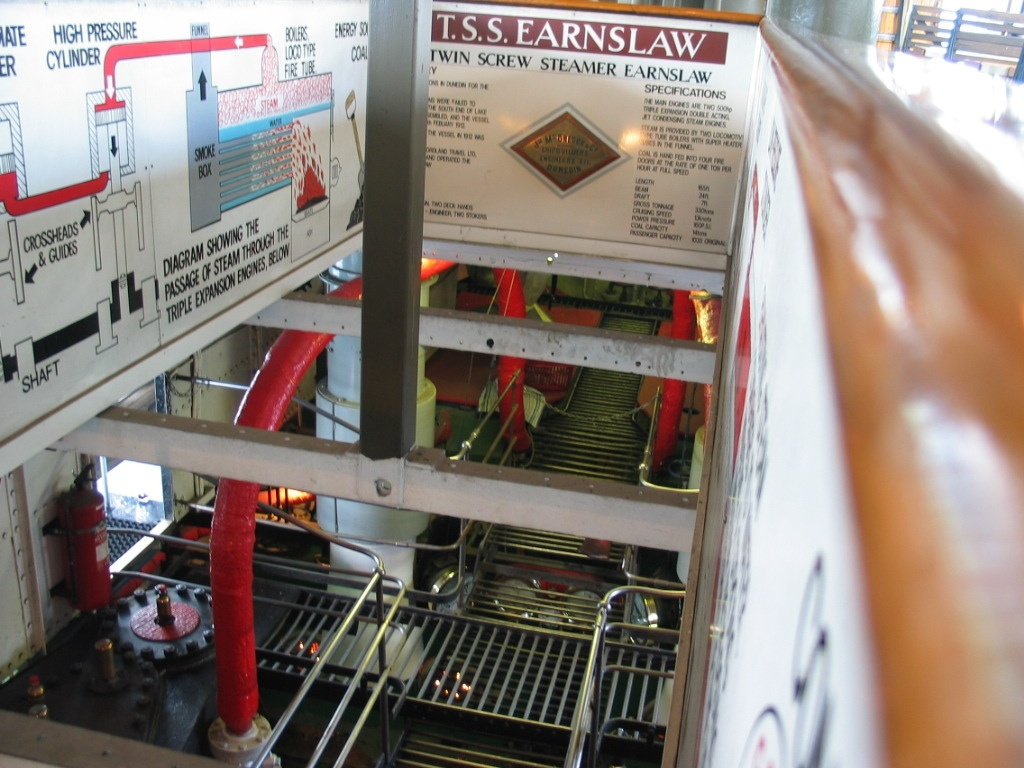
Engine well

Earnslaw celebrated her centenary in October 2012, and continues in routine operation carrying tourist passengers across Lake Wakatipu from Queenstown to Walter Peak High Country Farm, a tourism operation with farm tours, horse treks, heritage tours, barbecue lunches and evening dining at the historic Colonel's Homestead.

The ship works fourteen-hour days in the summer months and cruises for eleven months of the year, despite being over 100 years old. Visitors to the region can undertake a 1.5-hour cruise on board Earnslaw and view the workings of the steam engine and stokers.

Each year, Earnslaw undergoes an annual survey – typically from late May to early June – with every second year being taken out of the lake.

Passengers have access to a walkway in the engine room, where they can observe the operation of the engines during the cruise.

== Gallery ==
TSS Earnslaw

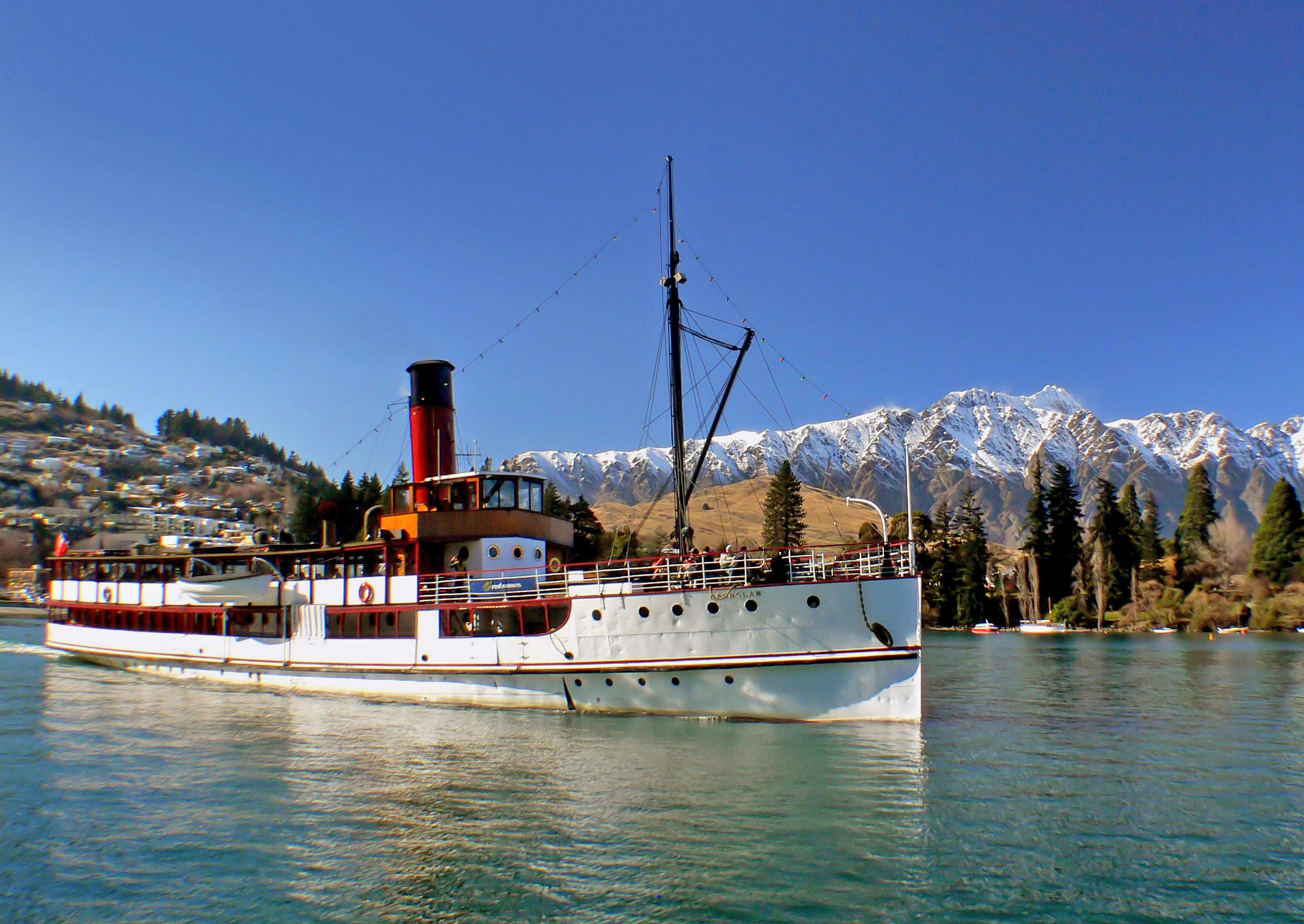
The TSS Earnslaw

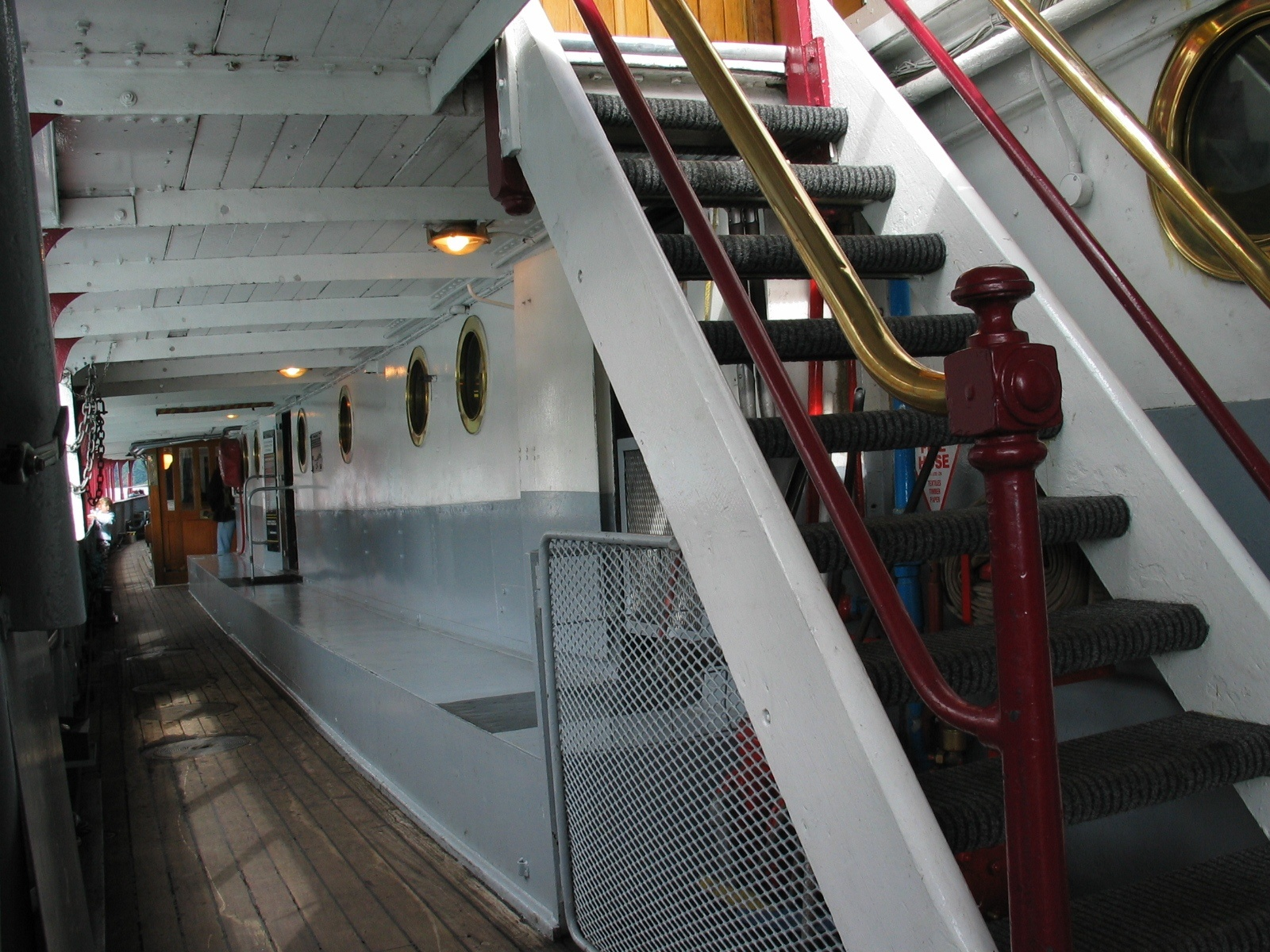
Stairway between decks, portside

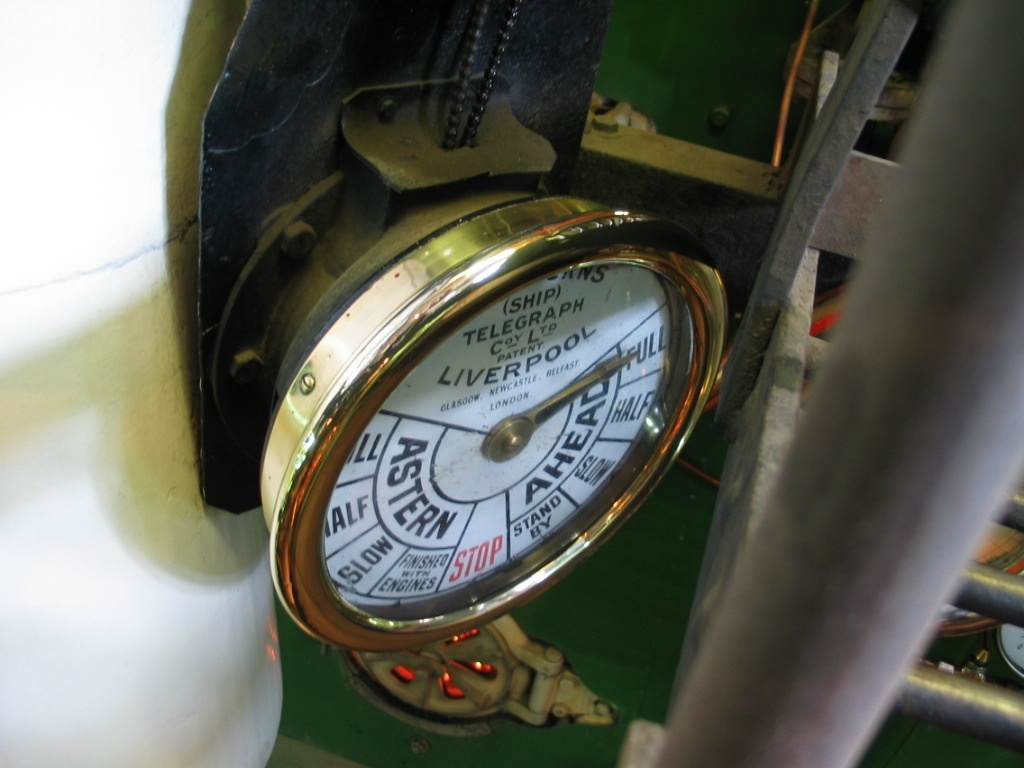
Engine order telegraph

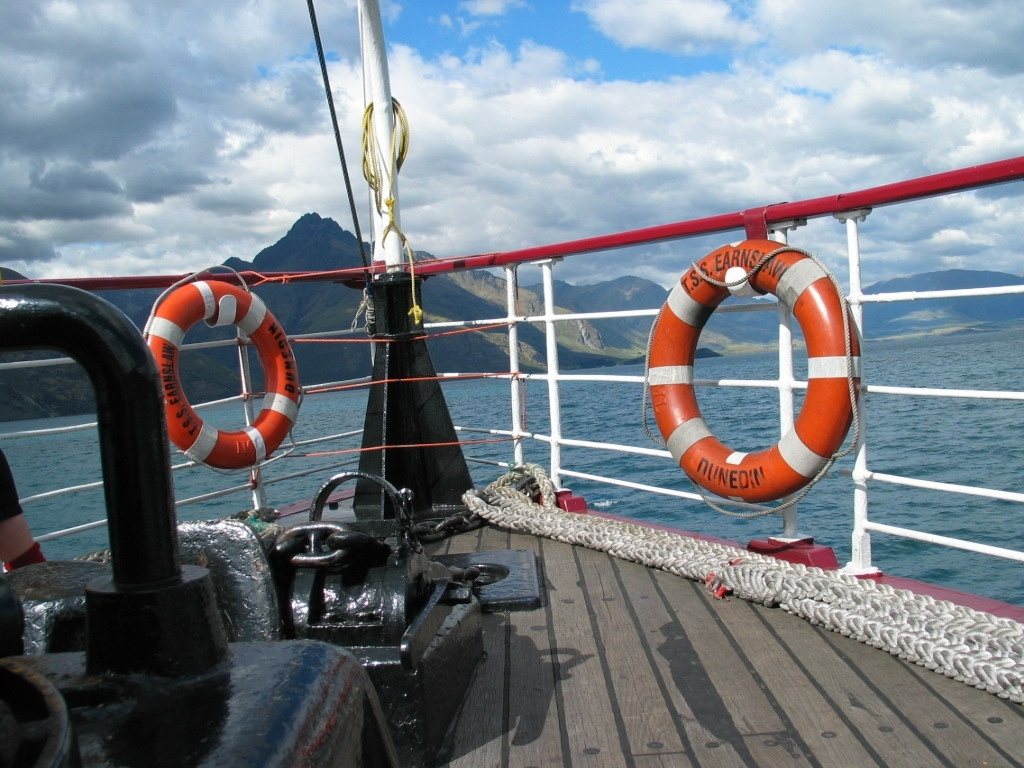
Foredeck view

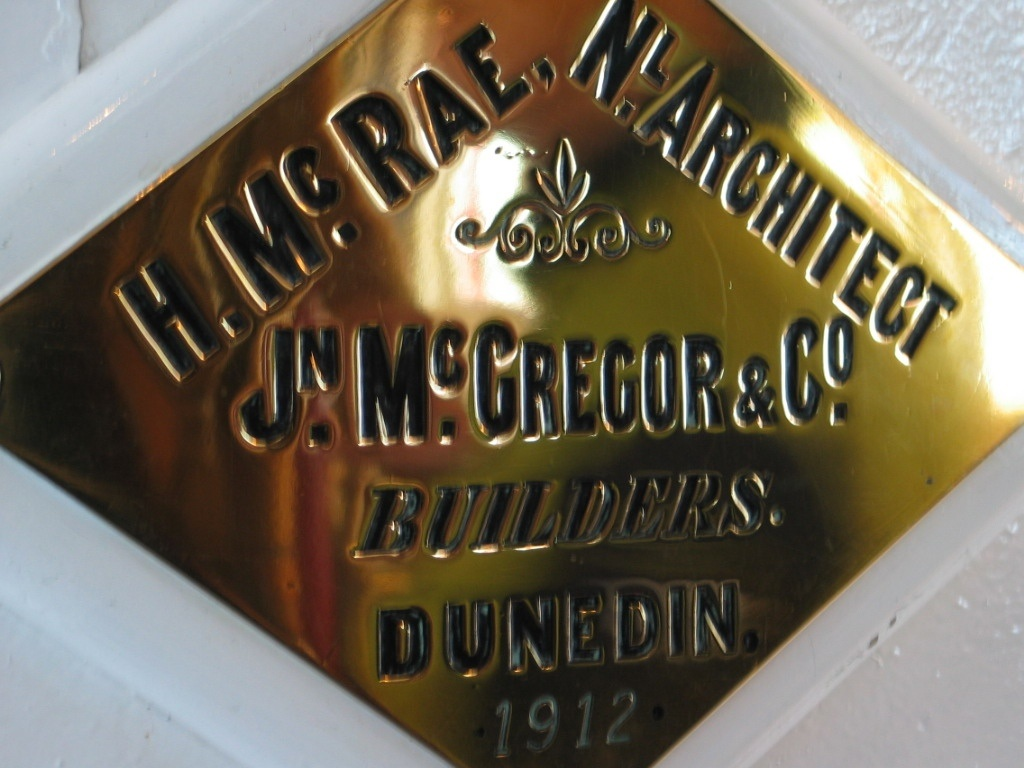
Shipbuilders plate

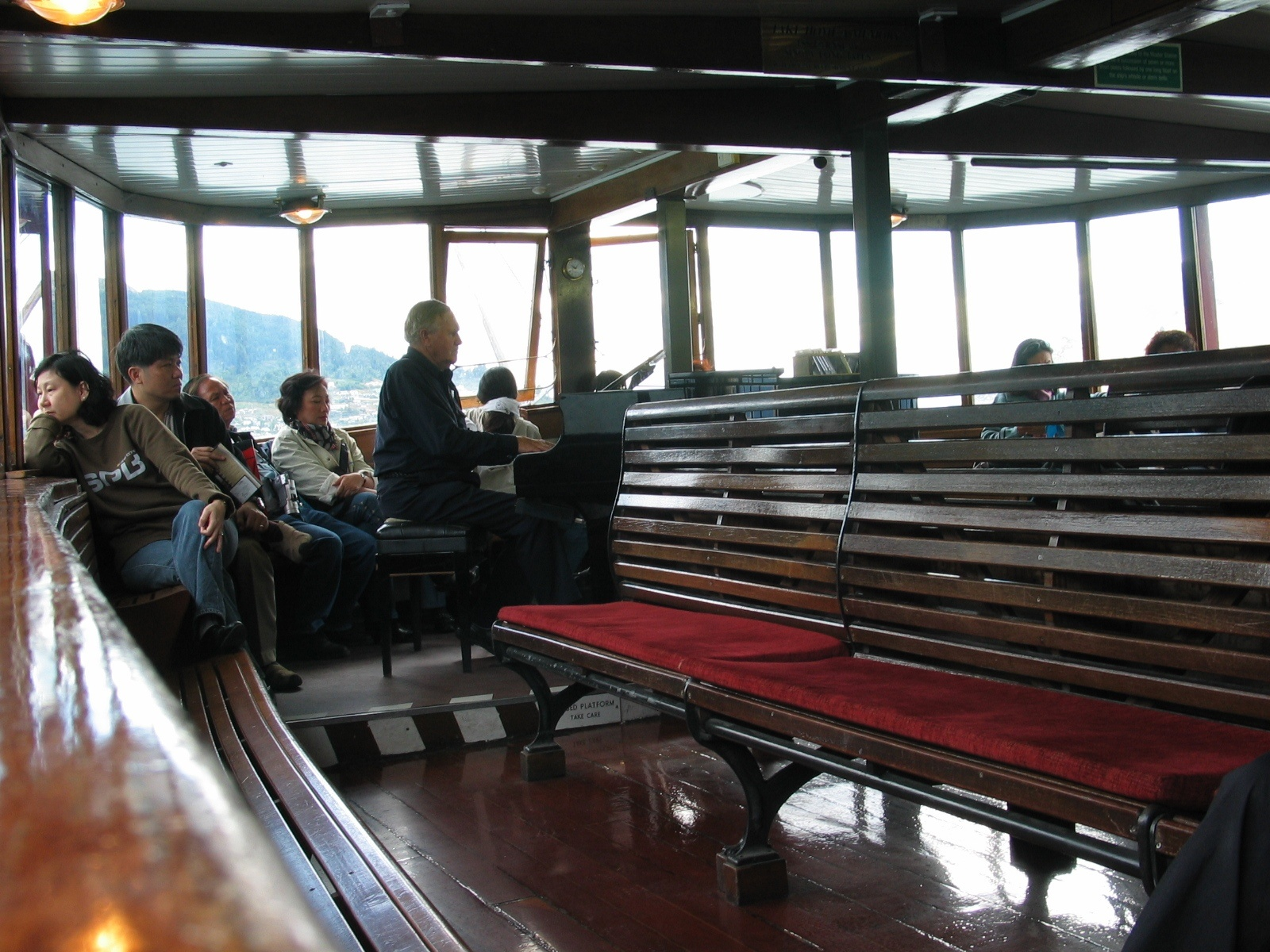
Pianist entertaining passengers

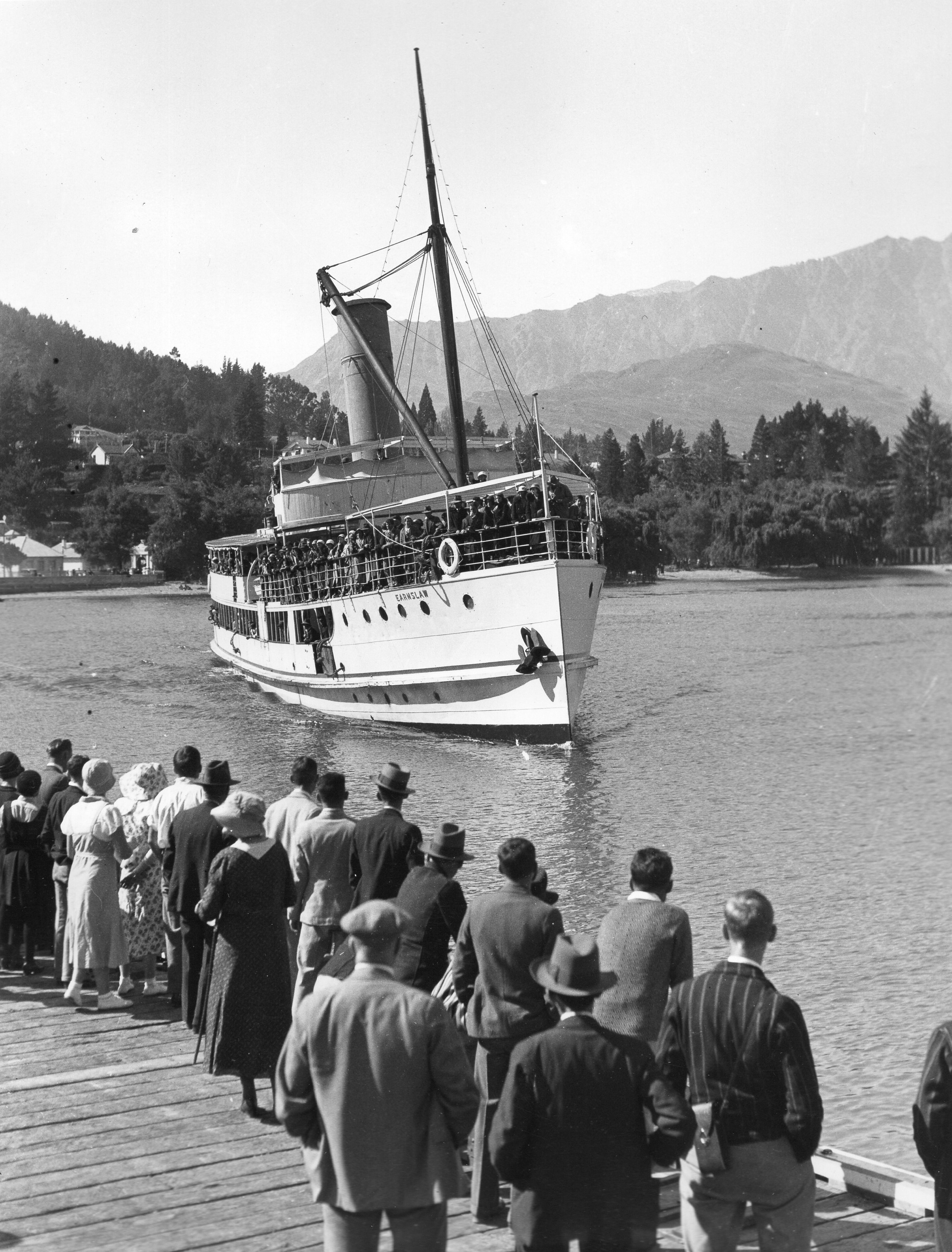
Approaching Queenstown in November 1962

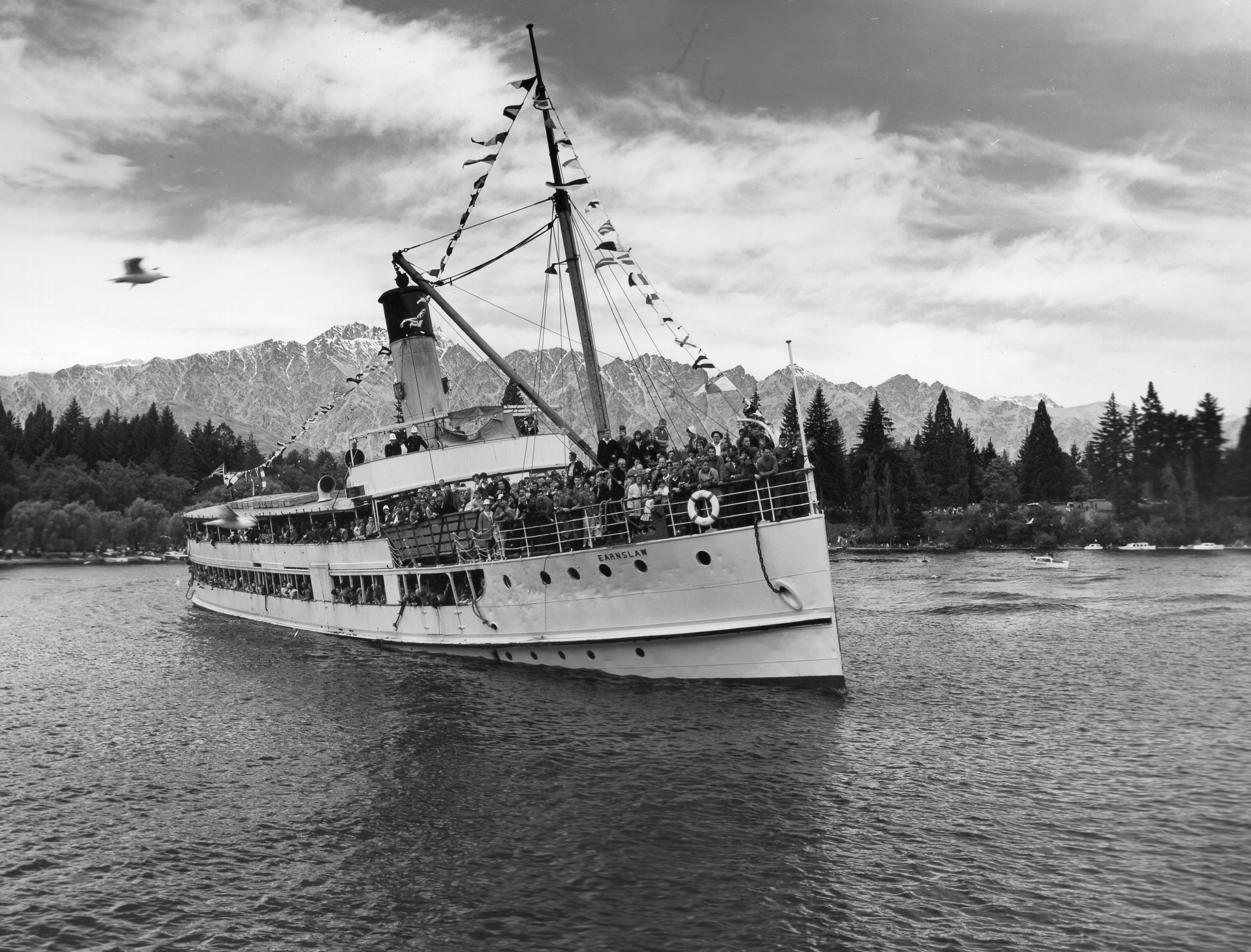
Earnslaw at the Wakatipu District Centenary, 1962

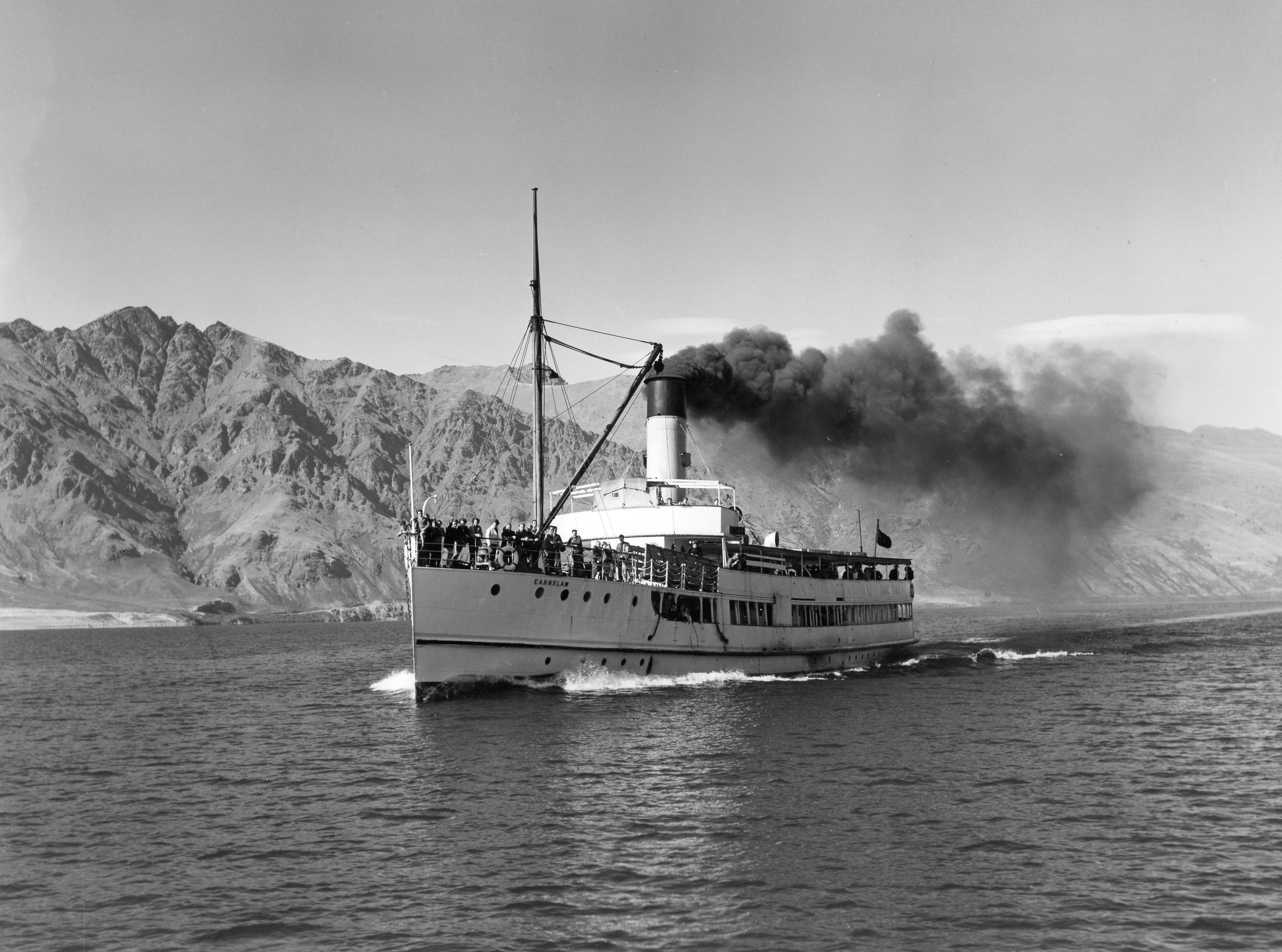
Earnslaw, 10 April 1965

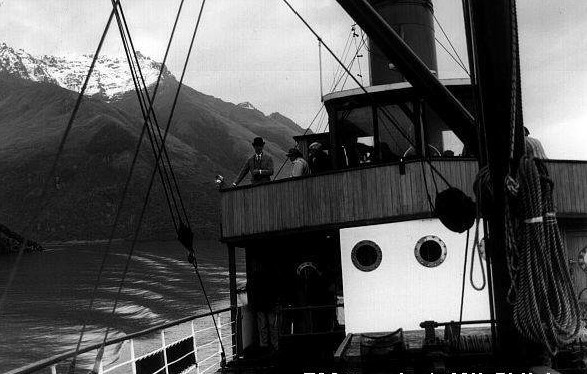
Steaming to Kingston

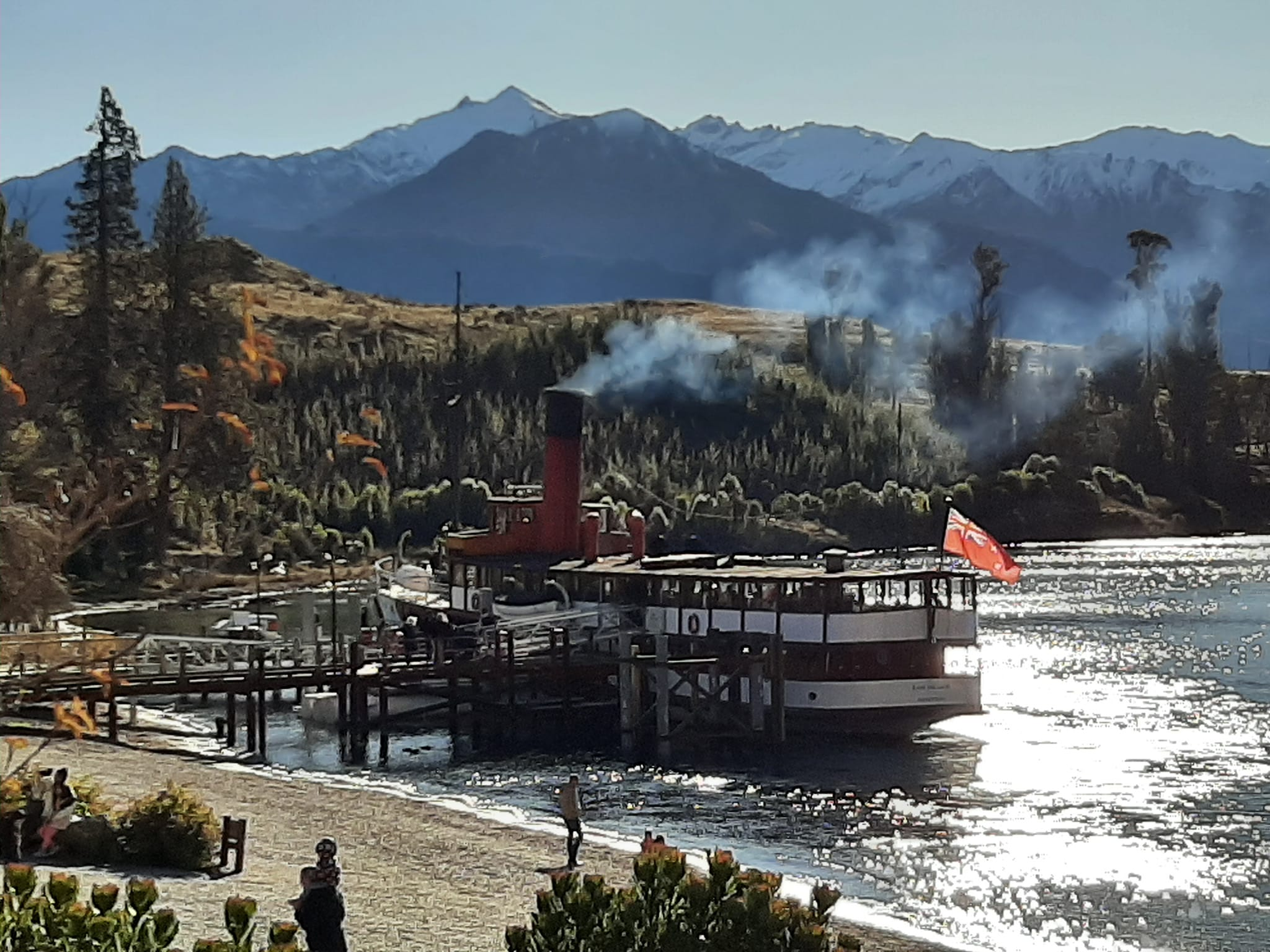
TSS Earnslaw, 2024

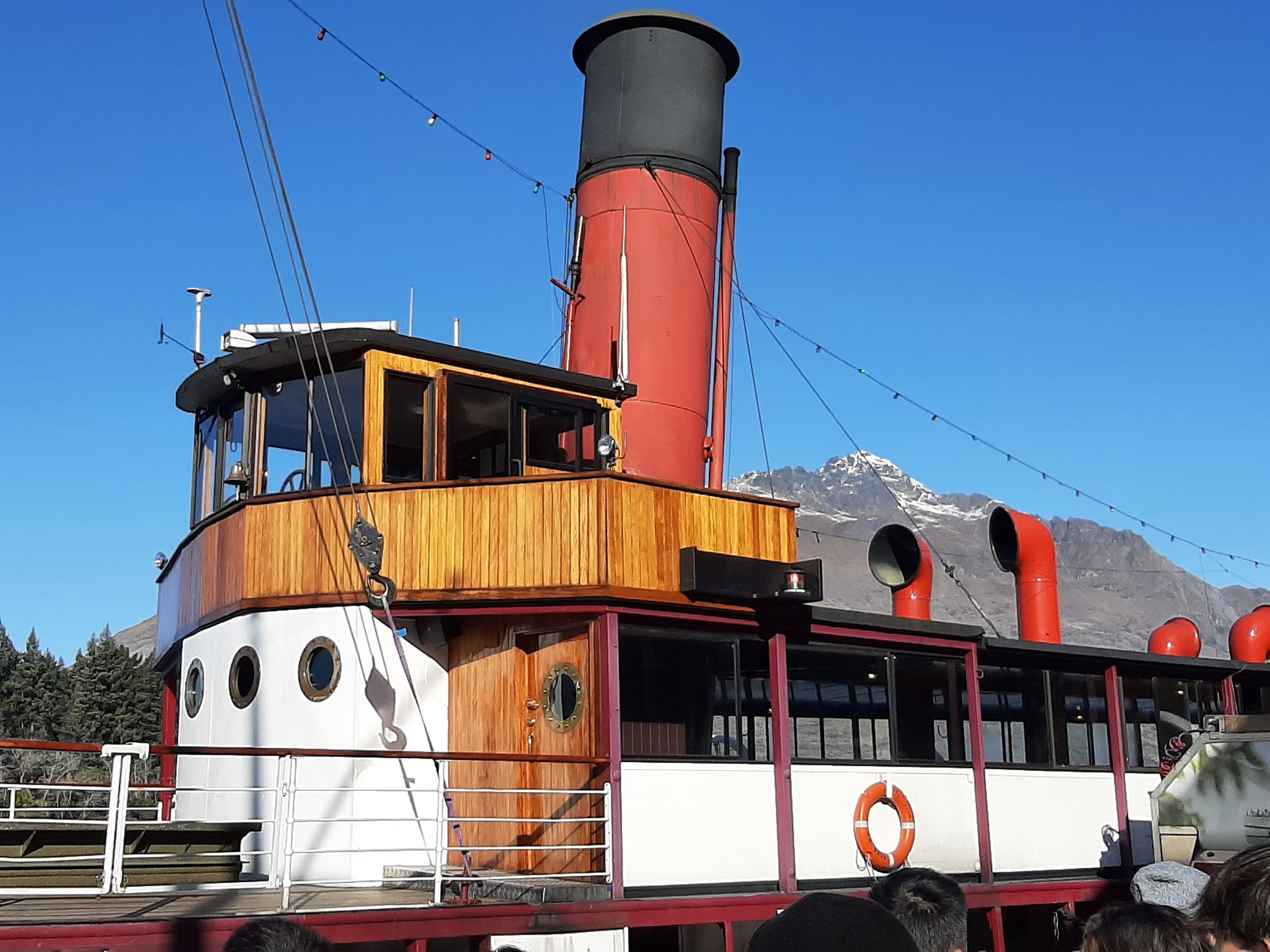
Closeup, 2024
